= Jayasurya filmography =

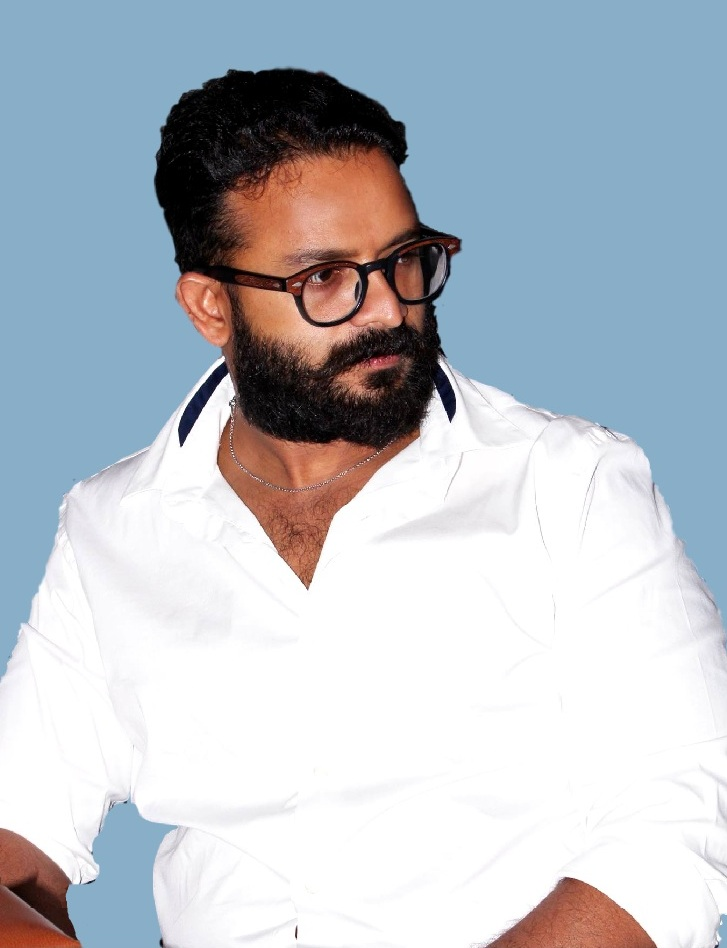
Jayasurya in 2016

Jayasurya is an Indian actor, playback singer, and producer who works in Malayalam films.

== Filmography ==
=== Malayalam language ===
Year	Title	Role	Notes	Ref.
1995	Three Men Army	Boy in theatre	Debut film; junior artist	
1996	K.L. 7/95 Ernakulam North	Jewellery salesman	Junior artist	
1997	Ancharakalyanam	Passenger in bus	Junior artist	
1998	Graama Panchaayathu	Bus conductor		
1999	Pathram	News Reporter		
2001	Dhosth	College Student		
2001	Aparanmaar Nagarathil	Sahadevan		
2002	Kalachakram	Prashanth's friend	Uncredited	
2002	Oomappenninu Uriyadappayyan	Bobby		
2002	Pranayamanithooval	Vinod		
2002	Kattuchembakam	Chandru		
2003	Swapnakkoodu	Ashtamoorthy		
2003	Pulival Kalyanam	Harikrishnan		
2004	Kerala House Udan Vilpanakku	Dineshan Kondody		
2004	Vellinakshathram	Indu's fiancee		
2004	Chathikkatha Chanthu	Chanthu		
2004	Greetings	Gopan		
2005	Immini Nalloral	Iranikara Jeevan		
2005	Bus Conductor	Najeeb		
2006	Kilukkam Kilukilukkam	Balu		
2006	Smart City	Varun		
2006	Classmates	Satheeshan Kanjikkuzhy		
2007	Changathipoocha	Sivankutty		
2007	Athishayan	Roy		
2007	Arabikkatha	Sidharthan		
2007	Kichamani MBA	Sajan		
2007	Chocolate	Renjith		
2007	Hareendran Oru Nishkalankan	Gopalakrishnan		
2007	Kangaroo	Monichan		
2008	De Ingottu Nokkiye	Vettikadu Sivan		
2008	Positive	ASP Aniyan		
2008	Shakespeare M.A. Malayalam	'Shakespeare' Pavithran		
2008	Minnaminnikoottam	Maani Kunju		
2008	Parunthu	Vinayan		
2008	Twenty:20	James	Special appearance	
2008	LollyPop	Francis aka Praanchi		
2009	Love in Singapore	Tony		
2009	Currency	Keshu		
2009	Ivar Vivahitharayal	Vivek		
2009	Dr. Patient	Dr. Ruben Isaac (Bobby)		
2009	Oru Black And White Kudumbam	Adithya Varma		
2009	Vairam: Fight For Justice	Jose Kutty		
2009	Robin Hood	ACP Harris		
2009	Utharaswayamvaram	Prakash		
2009	Kerala Cafe – Island Express	Vishal Krishna	Anthology film segment	
2009	Patham Nilayile Theevandi	Ramu		
2009	Gulumal: The Escape	Jerry		
2010	Happy Husbands	John Mathai		
2010	Nallavan	Kocherukkan		
2010	Cocktail	Venkatesh		
2010	Four Friends	Amir		
2011	Payyans	Josy		
2011	Janapriyan	Priyadarshan		
2011	The Train	Karthik		
2011	Sankaranum Mohananum	Sankaran and Mohanan	Dual role	
2011	Three Kings	Shankar Unni Raja		
2011	Beautiful	Stephen Louis		
2012	Kunjaliyan	Jayaraman		
2012	Vaadhyar	Anoop Krishnan		
2012	Namukku Parkkan	C.I. Velu Nagarajan	Guest appearance	
2012	Trivandrum Lodge	Abdu		
2012	Husbands in Goa	Govinda		
2012	101 Weddings	Jyothishkumar		
2012	Poppins	Husband		
2013	Players	Sivan	Delayed Release Shot in 2007	
2013	David and Goliath	David		
2013	Ithu Pathiramanal	Johnkutty	Extended Cameo	
2013	Mumbai Police	ACP Aaryan John Jacob		
2013	Hotel California	Jimmy		
2013	English: An Autumn in London	Shankaran		
2013	Pigman	Sreekumar		
2013	Thank You	Vinay Krishna		
2013	Anchu Sundharikal	Basil Shajan	Segment – Gauri -Cameo	
2013	D Company	Varaalu Jaison		
2013	Philips and the Monkey Pen	Roy Philip		
2013	Punyalan Agarbattis	Joy Thakkolkaran		
2014	Happy Journey	Aaron		
2014	Apothecary	Subin Joseph		
2014	Iyobinte Pustakam	Angoor Rawther		
2014	Lal Bahadur Shastri	Lal		
2014	Mathai Kuzhappakkaranalla	Mathai		
2014	Seconds	Veeramani		
2014	Aamayum Muyalum	Kallu		
2015	Aadu Oru Bheegara Jeevi Aanu	Shaji Pappan		
2015	Kumbasaram	Alby		
2015	Lukka Chuppi	Raghuram	Special Mention at National Film Awards	
2015	Jilebi	Sreekuttan		
2015	Amar Akbar Anthony	Akbar		
2015	Su Su Sudhi Vathmeekam	Sudhi Vathmeekam	Special Mention at National Film Awards	
2016	School Bus	Joseph		
2016	Shajahanum Pareekuttiyum	Prince		
2016	IDI - Inspector Dawood Ibrahim	Dawood Ibrahim		
2016	Pretham	John Don Bosco		
2017	Fukri	Lucky		
2017	Ramante Edanthottam	Himself	Cameo appearance	
2017	Honey Bee 2.5	Himself	Cameo appearance	
2017	Punyalan Private Limited	Joy Thakkolkaaran		
2017	Aadu 2	Shaji Pappan		
2018	Captain	V. P. Sathyan	Kerala State Film Award for Best Actor	
2018	Njan Marykutty	Marykutty	Kerala State Film Award for Best Actor	
2018	Pretham 2	John Don Bosco		
2019	Puzhikkadakan	District Collector Krishnakumar	Extended Cameo Appearance	
2019	Thrissur Pooram	Pullu Giri		
2020	Anveshanam	Aravind		
2020	Sufiyum Sujathayum	Rajeev		
2021	Vellam	Murali Nambiar	Kerala State Film Award for Best Actor	
2021	Sunny	Sunny	100th film	
2022	Meri Awas Suno	RJ Shankar		
2022	John Luther	CI John Luther		
2022	Padma	Angel statue	Voiceover	
2022	Eesho	Shiva / Eesho		
2023	Enthada Saji	Roy		
2026	Aadu 3	Shaji Pappan and Maharaja Padmanabha Thamburaan	Dual role	
2026	Titans	Antony Yakuza		
2026	Mayan: Chapter-1 †	SI Jeyson Valavath		
2027	Kathanar – The Wild Sorcerer †	Kadamattathu Kathanar		
2027	Operation Tral †	NIA SP Harshavardhan		

=== Other languages ===
Year	Title	Role	Language	Notes	Ref.
2002	En Mana Vaanil	Ganesh	Tamil	Remake of Oomappenninu Uriyadappayyan	
2004	Vasool Raja MBBS	Zahir	Tamil	Remake of Munna Bhai MBBS (2003)	
2006	Manathodu Mazhaikalam	Karthik	Tamil		
2008	Chakkara Viyugam	Sathish Mishra	Tamil		
2011	Sogasugara	Keshwa	Kannada	Remake of Oomappenninu Uriyadappayyan	

== As producer ==
As a producer, his debut venture was the movie Punyalan Agarbattis (2013).

List of Jayasurya credits as a producer List of Jayasurya film credits as producer
Year	Title	Notes
2013	Punyalan Agarbattis	
2015	Su Su Sudhi Vathmeekam	
2015	Moonamidam	Short film
2016	Pretham	
2017	Punyalan Private Limited	
2018	Pretham 2	

== Discography ==
Jayasurya has recorded a devotional song album at Vani Studio, Kochi. The album, Krishnakavyam, was produced by Goodluck Audios.

List of songs sung by Jayasurya List of Jayasurya song credits
Year	Song	Title	Co-singers	Music director	Ref.
2008	"Adhyaamaai"	Ormathalukal	Manjari	Anil Peter	
2011	"Bilsila Hai Bilsila"	Three Kings	Solo Song	Ousepachan	
2013	"Aashichavan"	Punyalan Agarbattis	Solo Song	Bijibal	
2014	"Maiyya Morre"	Happy Journey	Gopi Sunder	Gopi Sunder	
2015	"Chingaariyaadu"	Aadu Oru Bheegara Jeevi Aanu	Harsha KH, Muhammad Ashad	Shaan Rahman	
2015	"Premamennaal"	Amar Akbar Anthony	Nadirshah, Prithviraj, Indrajith, Kalabhavan Shajon	Nadirshah	
2016	"Kuruthakkedinte Koodanu"	Paavada	Solo Song	Aby Tom Cyriac	
2016	"Chithira Muthe"	Shajahanum Pareekuttiyum	Vijay Yesudas, Afsal, Divya S Menon	Gopi Sunder	
2019	"Kappalandi"	Ilayaraja	Solo Song	Ratheesh Vegha	

== Television ==
List of Jayasurya credits in television List of Jayasurya television credits
Year	Program	Role	Channel	Notes	Ref.
2000	Jagathy vs Jagathy	Host	Kairali TV		
2000	Fun Day Jackpot	Host			
2015	Idavelayil	Guest	Mazhavil Manorama	Talk Show	
2015	Comedy Super Nite	Guest	Flowers TV	Comedy Talk Show	
2015	I Personally	Guest	Kappa TV	Talk Show	
2017	Cinema Chirima	Guest	Mazhavil Manorama	Comedy Show	
2017	Fukri with Peekrees	Guest	Flowers TV	Talk show	
2017	Lal Salam	Guest	Amrita TV	Talk Show	
2018	Badai Bungalow	Guest	Asianet	Comedy Talk Show	
2018	Comedy Utsavam	Guest	Flowers TV	Comedy Show	
2018	Nayika Nayakan	Guest	Mazhavil Manorama	Reality Show	
2018	Thakarppan Comedy	Guest	Mazhavil Manorama	Comedy Talk Show	
2018	Nakshatrathilakkam	Guest	Mazhavil Manorama	Talk Show	
2019	Sa Re Ga Ma Pa Keralam	Guest	Zee Keralam	Reality Show	
2019	Swapnakoodile Thamaasakkar	Guest	Surya TV	Onam Special Talk Show	
2020	Funny Nights with Pearle Maaney	Guest	Zee Keralam	Talk Show	
2021	Comedy Mamangam	Performer	Asianet	Comedy Show	
2021	Star Magic	Chief Guest	Flowers TV	Game Show	
2021	Oru Chiri Iru Chiri Bumper Chiri	Guest	Mazhavil Manorama	Comedy Show	
2026	Star Singer season 10	Guest	Asianet	Reality Show	
