= Bash Mohammed =

Indian film director and writer

- Born: Brahmakulam, Kerala, India
- Education: College of Fine Arts, Thrissur
- Occupations: Director, Screenwriter, Producer
- Years active: 2015 - present
- Spouse: Sheeja Bash
- Children: 2

Bash Mohammed is an Indian movie writer, director, and producer born in Brahmakulam, near Guruvayur, Kerala, India. He primarily works in Malayalam cinema. Bash began his artistic journey as a student at the College of Fine Art, which laid the foundation for his creative pursuits. He began his career in advertising, working as a Creative Director for prestigious brands across the world, before venturing into filmmaking.

== Films ==
=== Lukka Chuppi (2015) ===
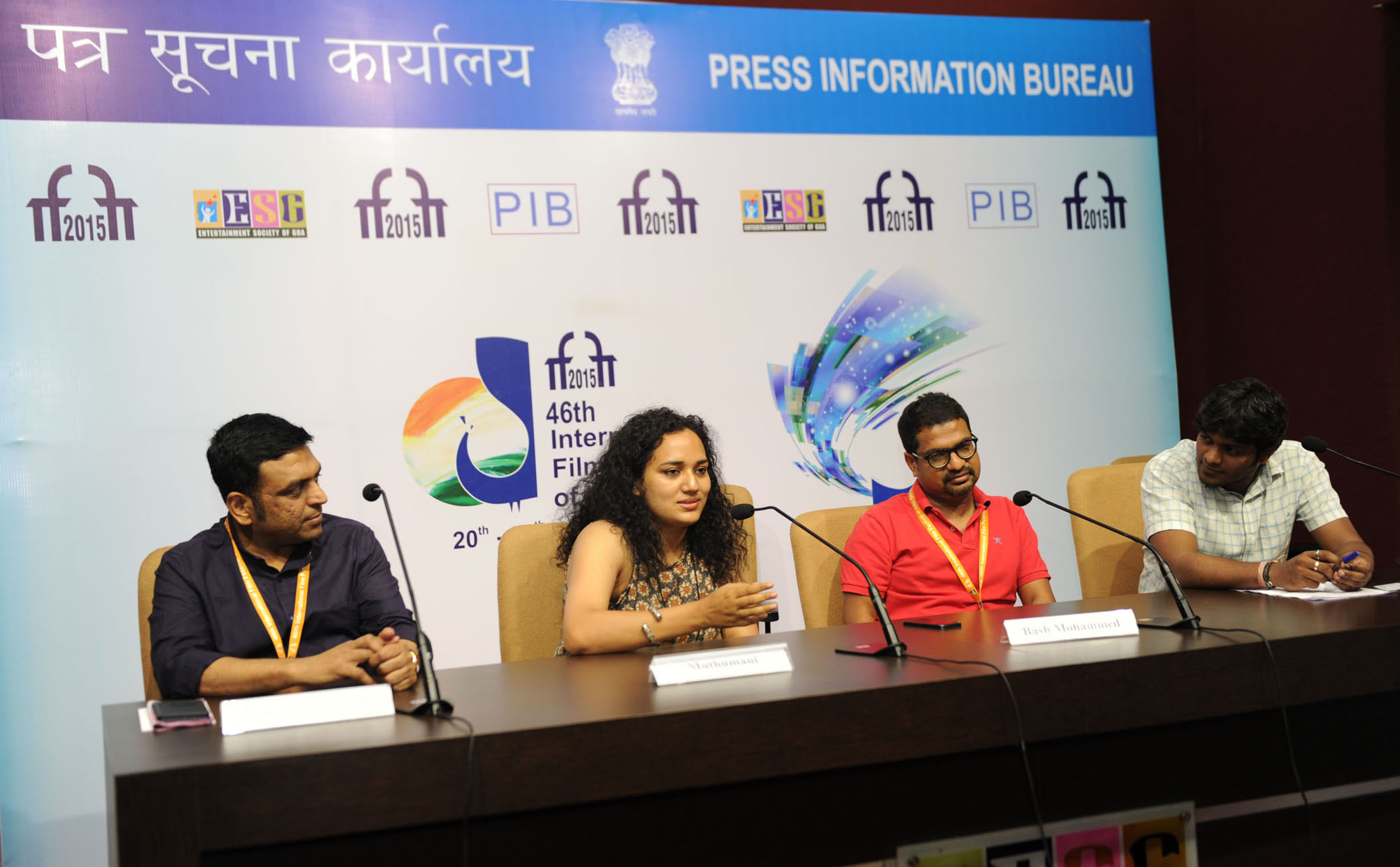
The Directors, Kaushik Ganguly, Bash Mohammed and the Film Sound Designer, Resul Pookutty at a press conference, during the Goa International Film Festival of India (IFFI-2015), in Panaji, Goa on 29 November 2015.

Bash made his directorial debut with the feature film Lukka Chuppi in 2015 which received rave reviews from critics and was selected for screening at prestigious events, including the 47th International Film Festival of India in Goa and the New York Indian Film Festival. Lukka Chuppi has achieved cult status among Malayali audiences for its poignant portrayal of relationships.

=== Prakasan (2017) ===
Bash directed his second film, Prakasan, which continued his exploration of interpersonal dynamics. The film premiered at the MAMI Mumbai Film Festival and was subsequently screened at the Museum of the Moving Image in New York, the Indian Film Festival in Los Angeles, and the Toulouse Indian Film Festival in France. It was also selected for Film Bazaar at IFFI Goa, further establishing Bash as a filmmaker of international repute.

=== Ennalum Ente Aliya (2023) ===
His third feature, a comedy titled Enaalum Ente Aliya, is a comedy available for streaming on Amazon Prime. His work is known for its focus on intricate narratives and relatable characters, often exploring themes of relationships and societal norms.

== Filmography ==
Year	Title	Credited as			Language	Notes
Year	Title	Director	Writer	Producer	Language	Notes
2015	Lukka Chuppi	Yes	Yes	Yes	Malayalam	Jayasurya won the special jury award at the Kerala State Film Awards.
2017	Prakasan	Yes			Malayalam	
2023	Ennalum Ente Aliya	Yes			Malayalam	Amazon Prime Video film
