= Ilai =

2017 Indian film by Bineesh Raj

- Theatrical release poster
- Directed by: Bineesh Raj
- Produced by: Sujith Stephanos
- Starring: Swathy Narayanan; Sujith Stephanos; King Mohan
- Cinematography: Santhosh Anchal
- Edited by: Tijo Joseph
- Music by: Vishnu V. Divakaran
- Production company: Action Reaction Productions
- Release date: 21 April 2017
- Running time: 121 mins
- Country: India
- Language: Tamil

Ilai (transl. Leaf) is a 2017 Indian Tamil-language drama film written and directed by Bineesh Raj. Swathy Narayanan features in the lead role, while Sujith Stephanos, King Mohan, and Noorin Shereef among others play supporting roles. The film began production during early 2016 and was released on 21 April 2017.

== Cast ==
- Swathy Narayanan as Ilai
- Sujith Stephanos as Manikandan
- King Mohan as Marimuthu
- Sreedevi Anil as Ramaayi
- Noorin Shereef as Chithra
- Aswin Shiva as Anbu
- Baby Zeniya as Baby
- Devu as Malli Akka
- Sreeja Thiruvalla as CM
- Manjith Madhusoodhanan as CM's PA
- Sivakumar Kurukkal
- Swapna Sivakumar
- Liju Prakash as Kaaliyan
- Sonia Jose as Malli Akka's mother
- Velumani as Ayyappan
- Jebin Jesmes as Gandhi
- Kanakalatha as Tea Shop Owner
- Saritha Kukku as Teacher
- SS Bijuraaj as Headmaster
- Hakkim as Inspector

== Production ==
The film began production in late 2015, with actress Swathy Narayanan partaking in a photo shoot for the project in December 2015. Playing the title role of Ilai, the film marked Swathy's Tamil debut, after she had previously appeared in Malayalam films including Vasanthiyum Lakshmiyum Pinne Njaanum (1999) and Su.. Su... Sudhi Vathmeekam (2015). Along with Swathy, Malayalam actress Sreedevi Anil and Kannada actor King Mohan were also selected to star in the film. The film was set in the remote villages of Tamil Nadu in early 1991, dealing with the importance of education for young girls. The director, Bineesh Raj, also doubled up as the film's VFX artist.

== Soundtrack ==
The soundtrack was composed by Vishnu V. Divakaran. All lyrics are written by Soumiya Raj.

No.	Title	Singer(s)	Length
1.	"Ilai Ilai"	Kapil Kapilan, Sreedevi, Bineesh Raj	3:48
2.	"Ilaye Ennilaye"	Sreedevi, Bineesh Raj	3:23

== Release ==
The film opened on 21 April 2017 across Tamil Nadu alongside Marx's Nagarvalam. The Times of India wrote "coupled with the characterisation and lines, it gives the film the feel of a Natural Life and that the tone, resembling a public service announcement, which the director chooses to tell this tale that plays spoilsport". A critic from Indiaglitz.com wrote "despite all its shortcomings, Ilai is a film needs to be lauded for its noble theme, realistic approach and the impactful portrayal of a rural girl’s struggle to get education".
