= Prakasan =

- Directed by: Bash Mohammed
- Written by: Rajeev Nair
- Produced by: Feelreel Films and Overlap films
- Starring: Dinesh Prabhakar; Laya Krishna; Indrans; Saiju Kurup; Maala Parvathi; Nandan Challissery; Subeesh Sudhi
- Cinematography: Pappinu
- Edited by: Manoj & Reza Serkaniean
- Music by: Bijibal
- Release date: 2017
- Running time: 84 minutes
- Country: India
- Language: Malayalam

Prakasan is a 2017 Malayalam drama movie directed by Bash Mohammed. It was screened at Mumbai Film Festival. The film was selected for Discovery India section at the Mumbai International Film Festival (MAM). The movie is set to screen at MOMI festival.

== Plot ==
The movie depicts the life of a tribal youth named Prakasan who lives with his mother and sister in Chamakundy, Kerala. He dreams of having a job in a city, which comes true. Prakasan's designated job is a health care worker which includes locating prostitutes to distribute condoms and spread awareness. He finds it hard to wrap his head around this in a fast-paced life.

== Cast ==
- Dinesh Prabhakar as Prakasan
- Parvathi T. as Madam
- Indrans as Peon
- Laya Krishna as Malli
- Saiju Kurup as Forest Officer
- Subeesh Sudhi as Alex

== Reception ==
"Bash tries to juxtapose two different lifestyles and portray the dilemma in the protagonist's heart, bringing a lot of joy and emotion to the film." - Suparna Thombare

The Hollywood Reporter applauded the film for its broad humor. Especially the technical work, editing and cinematography of the film for making a sophisticated work within the tight budget.
