= Veeber =

Veeber is a surname. Notable people with the surname include:

- Agaate Veeber (1901–1988), Estonian graphic artist
- Kuno Veeber (1898–1929), Estonian painter

== See also ==
- Veber
- Weber (disambiguation)
