= April Fool (2010 film) =

2010 Malayalam comedy film by Viji Thampi

- Theatrical release poster
- Directed by: Viji Thampi
- Written by: Jagadish
- Produced by: Santhosh Damodharan
- Starring: Jagadish; Siddique; Navya Natarajan
- Cinematography: Sanjeev Shankar
- Edited by: Raja Muhammad
- Music by: M. Jayachandran
- Release date: 1 April 2010
- Country: India
- Language: Malayalam

April Fool is a 2010 Malayalam comedy film directed by Viji Thampi, written by Jagadish, and produced by Santosh Damodar. It stars Jagadish, Siddique and Navya Natarajan in lead roles.

While the film credits Jagadish as the script writer, it is in fact an uncredited remake (except for some regional adaptations in the dialogue) of the 2007 Bollywood film Bheja Fry by Sagar Bellary which itself was a remake of the 1998 French film Le Dîner de Cons by Francis Veber (which in turn was a cinema adaptation of the theatrical play of the same name written by Veber himself) which was also adapted in Kannada as Mr. Garagasa and in English as Dinner for Schmucks

== Plot ==
Rakesh Menon is a music producer (a publisher in Veber's script) married to a singer. Rakesh and his friends get together every Friday for a party. In this party, they invite idiots to ridicule them behind the scenes and calling them "talent". They enjoy doing it so much that they don't even mind missing out on family appointments.

One of Rakesh's friends meets Krishnanunni, an Income Tax Inspector (a Finance Ministry employee in Veber's script), on a bus trip and decides that he could probably be a source of entertainment for Rakesh. Rakesh promptly calls Krishnanunni and invites him for dinner.

Krishnanunni is a talkative self-promoting singer (in Veber's script, passionate in building replicas of landmarks with matchsticks) who carries with him a photo album showcasing his musical life. He is excited at the prospect of meeting a music producer which might help advance his career as a singer. Krishnanunni is kind-hearted and wants to help everyone but he also has the ability to mess things up for people around him. He can be annoying to the person who is sitting next to him but he makes it a funny experience for everyone else watching him.

Friday arrives but Rakesh accidentally falls into a swimming pool and gets injured (a golf injury, in Veber's script). His back is sprained badly and is restricted from moving around. Rakesh knows that he will not be able to make it to the party but still decides to meet Krishnanunni to see how good or rather bad he is. Before Krishnanunni arrives at Rakesh's residence, Rakesh's wife leaves after an altercation with Rakesh. When Rakesh asks Krishnanunni to call his family doctor, he accidentally calls Rakesh's girlfriend. Rakesh asks Krishnanunni to leave his home for all the mess he has created. Rakesh tries to get information regarding his wife's whereabout. Krishnanunni offers to help and calls Rakesh's wife's previous boyfriend Sarath under a false identity. Instead, he ends up giving Rakesh's Landline number that makes it obvious to Sarath that Rakesh is trying to get all details. Sarath tells Rakesh that his wife might have gone to a party hosted by a sex-freak.

It turns out that a colleague of Krishnanunni, an Income Tax Inspector Grade 1 (a tax auditor, in Veber's script), knows the whereabouts of this person. Jagathy is an eccentric character who loves to watch cricket and is an ardent fan of Sachin Tendulkar.

While trying to mend the relationship between Rakesh and his wife, she tells Krishnanunni that he was called by Rakesh to make a fool of him and have fun at his expense. This hurts Krishnanunni, but the good-hearted Krishnanunni still wants to help Rakesh by letting her know how sorry Rakesh is because of his acts and how much he loves her.

Krishnanunni does so by calling Rakesh's wife, who had been involved in a car accident after leaving the apartment for the second time (the first time being when Krishnanunni had sent her away thinking she was really Rakesh's ex-girlfriend), and makes no mistakes in this conversation, as well as making up near perfect excuses on the spot and with no prompting. After encouraging Rakesh's wife to return home, Krishnanunni makes yet another mistake after he picks up the telephone when she calls to talk to Brochant despite having previously told her he was in a phone booth.

== Cast ==
- Jagadish as C. R. Krishnanunni / Unni
- Siddique as Rakesh Menon
- Navya Natarajan as Seema Menon, Rakesh's Wife
- Biju Menon as Sharath, Rakesh's Friend
- Jagathy Sreekumar as Sathyakaman / Sathyakamanji, Unni's Superior Officer
- Ashokan as Viswanath, Rakesh's Friend
- K. P. A. C. Lalitha as Unni's Mother
- Indrans as Njana Sheelan
- Kaveri as Unni's wife
- Mythili Roy as Mohinichandran, Rakesh's Ex-Girlfriend
- Lal as Dr. Mohanachandran, Rakesh's Friend
- Thara Kalyan as Malathi
- Dinesh Panicker as Duttan
- Mukesh as Balu (Cameo appearance)
- Lena as Latha, Balu's Wife (Cameo appearance)

== Soundtrack ==
All lyrics were written by Gireesh Puthenchery.

- "Kaattil" - KS Chithra
- "Sundariyam" - M. Jayachandran

== Production and release ==
The film was shot in Thiruvananthapuram. It was released on the April Fools' Day (1 April) of 2010.

== Reception ==
Sify.com wrote "After Happy Husbands drew inspiration from Charlie Chaplin (and also from its Hindi version, No Entry), here is another copy in Malayalam cinema, where the dearth of original ideas has become a real threat. The question here is, do we need such shameless rip-offs, when the DVDs of Hindi films are available here aplenty? We want original films, not some uninspiring imitations!" Paresh C Palicha from Rediff.com wrote "Coming back to the original question of the tagline used in the movie title -- yes, I believe it is intended as an April Fool joke as the film is a blatant copy of the hugely successful Hindi film, Bheja Fry." Shyam PV from News18 India wrote that "Undoubtedly, this time too, Viji Thampi wasted a good opportunity to utilise a bunch of top class artistes to the fullest."
