= Navya =

Navya (lit. 'new' in Sanskrit) may refer to:

- Navya-Nyāya, view, system, or school of Indian logic and philosophy, founded in the 13th century
- Navya movement, a school of writing in Kannada literature which originated in the 1950s
- Navya (TV series), an Indian television drama
- Navya SAS, a French manufacturer of driverless electric and robotic vehicles, based in Villeurbanne near Lyon

== Given name ==
- Navya Nair (born 1985), Indian actress
- Navya Natarajan, Indian actress
