= Rasathanthram =

- VCD Cover
- Directed by: Sathyan Anthikkad
- Written by: Sathyan Anthikkad
- Produced by: Antony Perumbavoor
- Starring: Mohanlal; Meera Jasmine; Bharath Gopi; Innocent; Oduvil Unnikrishnan; Mamukkoya
- Cinematography: Alagappan N.
- Edited by: K. Rajagopal
- Music by: Ilaiyaraaja
- Production company: Aashirvad Cinemas
- Distributed by: Central Pictures Release
- Release date: 7 April 2006
- Running time: 160 minutes
- Country: India
- Language: Malayalam

Rasathanthram (transl. Chemistry) is a 2006 Indian Malayalam-language family drama film written and directed by Sathyan Anthikkad and starring Mohanlal and Meera Jasmine, with Bharath Gopi, Innocent, Oduvil Unnikrishnan, and Mamukkoya in prominent roles. The film was produced by Antony Perumbavoor through Aashirvad Cinemas. The soundtrack album was composed by Ilaiyaraaja, while Alagappan N. handled the cinematography.

Rasathanthram was released in theatres on 7 April 2006 and received positive reviews with critics praising performance of Mohanlal, Gopy and Jasmine. The film performed well at the box office, it grossed ₹21 crore worldwide and completed 100 days theatrical run. The screenplay was released as a book in August 2006 by DC Books.

== Plot ==
Premachandran is a carpenter who lives with his father, Balan Master, and works along with his friend, Manikandan. They are working on a house near the house of a rich landlord. Kanmani, who was sold by her mother, works in that house as a servant and is ill-treated. Seethamma lives along with her daughter, Kumari, who has feelings for Premachandran.

One night, Premachandran goes to his workplace to take his tools. He is surprised to see Kanmani leaving the house and follows her. She is about to commit suicide when Premachandran intervenes. He gives her shelter in one room in a building owned by Chettiyar, telling Chettiyar that she is his male friend who did not get the bus to go back home. Kanmani dresses up as a boy by the name of Velayuthan Kutty and soon starts working with Manikandan and Premachandran. Balan Master starts liking the disguised boy.

One day, Premachandran tells Kanmani that he has planned to rescue her by sending her to Tamil Nadu to work in a banyan company where Premachandran's friend is working. Kanmani refuses to go. Premachandran accidentally confesses to Manikandan that Velayuthan Kutty is actually the missing Kanmani. Manikandan has no peace and shouts out the truth in the middle of the night. Two policemen, accidentally hear this and take Premachandran and Kanmani into custody.

Kanmani tells the court that she and Premachandran are in love and intended to elope. She said this to avoid imprisonment. Soon, Kanmani develops an affection towards Premachandran. Premachandran tells her that she does not know anything about him and that he is an ex-convict in a murder case. Actually, Premachandran's friend Sivan murdered a hooligan who abused Premachandran's sister. Kanmani now agrees to go to Tamil Nadu, but Premachandran does not let her go, he admits her in a hostel.

Premachandran's brother, Ramachandran, comes to the fray and asks Balan Master to attend his daughter's marriage. He asks that Premachandran not come. Actually, Balan Master and Premachandran are living far away from home because of the bad nature shown by Premachandran's brother and sister. Balan Master is not willing to go without Premachandran. Premachandran who loves his niece as his daughter changes Balan Master's mind, by going with him without anybody knowing he is there. On returning, they see their rented house being destroyed. Balan Master takes shelter in an old age home headed by a retired Colonel until a new house can be rented.

Premachandran goes to Kochi to meet Sivan – who is now a business tycoon, but Sivan does not meet Premachandran's needs. On returning, Premachandran finds out that Balan Master is dead. He performs the ceremonial rites and goes to Kanmani. Meanwhile, Kanmani's so called uncle (Jagathty Sreekumar) – who wants to marry Kanmani – and his sister have court orders to take Kanmani back to Tamil Nadu. But, Premachandran grabs the "thali mala" from Sundara Pandian, ties the knot on Kanmani and subsequently marries her.

== Cast ==
- Mohanlal as Premachandran / Preman, a successful carpenter
- Meera Jasmine as Kanmani/ Velayudhan Kutty
- Bharath Gopi as Balan Master, Ramachandran and Premachandran's father
- Innocent as Manikandan Aashari, the lead-carpenter
- Mamukkoya as Kunjoottan, Manikandan's brother-in-law
- Oduvil Unnikrishnan as Ganeshan Chettiyar, Premachandran's house owner
- K. P. A. C. Lalitha as Seethamma, Premachandran's neighbour
- Muthumani as Kumari, Seethamma's daughter
- Bindu Panicker as Sobhana, Manikandan Aashari's wife
- Siddique as Ramachandran, Premachandran's elder brother
- Mukesh as Shivan, Premachandran's childhood friend (Cameo appearance)
- Jagathi Sreekumar as Vetrivel Sundara Pandiyan (Cameo appearance)
- Suraj Venjaramoodu as Suresh, a Carpenter
- Anoop Chandran as Kunjambu, Video shop owner
- P. Sreekumar as Roychan
- T. G. Ravi as Retd Colonel Santhosh Kumar
- Manjusha Sajish as Sreekutty
- Reshmi Boban as Lucy, Roy's sister
- Bindu Murali as Nancy, Roy's wife
- Maneesha K S as Tessy, Roy's sister
- TP Radhamani
- Sethu Lakshmi as Roy's Servant
- Nivia Rebin as Ancymol
- Vijayan Karanthoor as CI Aliyan

== Production ==
Sathyan Anthikkad and Mohanlal teamed up again after 12 years for this movie. Their previous movie was Pingami (1994). Rasathanthram is the debut screenplay of Sathyan Anthikkad. Initially Anthikkad thought of giving someone else the scripting duty, but his regular collaborator were busy with other project, so he decided to write the film himself. Rasathanthram became his first film to begin filming with a complete script. Anthikkad describes the storyline as "it is the essence of the chemistry of the duo's life that develops with the rasas (humours) and little thantras (techniques) played by them to earn their living. In general, it delves into the meaninglessness of relationships and the ultimate values of human love". The film was shot at various locations in Thodupuzha, Moolamattom, and nearby places in Idukki district.

== Soundtrack ==
Rasathanthram

Soundtrack album by Ilaiyaraaja
- Released: March 2006
- Genres: Feature film soundtrack, popular music
- Label: Manorama Music
- Producer: Antony Perumbavoor

The songs were composed by Ilaiyaraaja and lyrics were penned by Gireesh Puthenchery.

Rasathanthram
No.	Title	Singer(s)	Length
1.	"Poo Kunkumappoo" (Shuddha Dhanyasi)	K. J. Yesudas	4:00
2.	"Attinkarayorathe" (Natabhairavi)	Manjari	5:14
3.	"Thevaram Nokkunnunde" (Keeravani)	Vineeth Sreenivasan	4:51
4.	"Poo Kunkumappoo" (Shuddha Dhanyasi)	K. S. Chithra	4:00
5.	"Ponnavanippadam" (Shivaranjani)	Madhu Balakrishnan, Manjari	4:56

== Box office ==
Rasathanthram was released on 7 April 2006 in Kerala. Including print and publicity, it was made on a budget of ₹2.87 crore. The film had record collection in 27 releasing stations in Kerala. Rasathanthram grossed ₹21 crore from worldwide box office, becoming the 2nd highest-grossing Malayalam film of the year. It completed 100 days theatrical run.

== Awards ==
Mathrubhumi Film Awards

- Best Director – Sathyan Anthikkad
- Best Character Actress – Muthumani
- Best Cinematography – Azhagappan N.
- Best Art Director – Prashanth Madhav

All India Radio Awards

- Best Male Actor – Mohanlal
- Best Director – Sathyan Anthikkad

Kerala Film Critics Association Awards

- Best Female Playback Singer – Manjari

Asianet Film Awards

- Best Comic Actor – Innocent
- Best Female Playback Singer – Manjari
