= Meenakshi Kalyanam =

- Directed by: Jose Thomas
- Written by: Udayakrishna; Siby K. Thomas
- Screenplay by: Udaykrishna; Sibi K. Thomas
- Produced by: Davi Rafel; Prince Rafel
- Starring: Mukesh; Mohini; Jagathy Sreekumar
- Cinematography: Alagappan N.
- Edited by: K. Rajagopal
- Music by: Songs: Nadirsha; Score: C. Rajamani
- Production company: Nedumbakkaran Creations
- Distributed by: Nedumbakkaran Creations
- Release date: 25 December 1998
- Country: India
- Language: Malayalam

Meenakshi Kalyanam is a 1998 Indian Malayalam film, directed by Jose Thomas and produced by Davi Rafel and Prince Rafel. The film stars Mukesh, Mohini and Jagathy Sreekumar in the lead roles, one of the superhit movie in 1998. The film has musical score by C. Rajamani and songs by Nadirsha.

== Cast ==
- Mukesh as Eerali Balan
- Mohini as Meenakshi
- Jagathy Sreekumar as Vasu
- Kalabhavan Mani as Pushkaran
- Kalabhavan Navas as Unnikrishnan
- Oduvil Unnikrishnan as Adv. Eashwara Pilla
- Salim Kumar as Adv. Sivan Mullassery
- Baiju as Wilson
- Augustine as SI Puli Chacko
- Sadiq as Vishwanathan
- Sukumari as Janaki, Vanitha commission chairperson
- Baiju Ezhupunna
- Chali Pala as Gopinathan Nair
- KPAC Sabu
- Sreejaya as Lakshmi
- Ramya Sudha as Asha
- V. K. Sreeraman as Madhavan Thampi
- Manka Mahesh as Kousalya

== Soundtrack ==
The music was composed by C. Rajamani and Nadirsha, with the former composing the film score and later the songs. The lyrics for songs were written by Arumughan Vengidangu, S. Ramesan Nair and Joffy Tharakan.

No.	Song	Singers	Lyrics	Length (m:ss)
1	"Kodungaloorambalathil"	Kalabhavan Mani	Arumughan Vengidangu	
2	"Manjaadikkunnile Praave"	Nadirsha	S. Ramesan Nair	
3	"Manjaadikkunnile Praave" [D]	Radhika Thilak, Viswanath	S. Ramesan Nair	
4	"Swarnappakshi"	Viswanath	S. Ramesan Nair	
5	"Thillaana Paadi Varoo"	M. G. Sreekumar	Joffy Tharakan	
6	"Thirayezhuthum Mannil"	K. J. Yesudas	S. Ramesan Nair	
7	"Thirayezhuthum Mannil" [D]	K. J. Yesudas, Radhika Thilak	S. Ramesan Nair	
8	"Thirayezhuthum Mannil" [D2]	K. J. Yesudas, K. S. Chithra	S. Ramesan Nair	
