= Sundar Das =

Indian film director in Malayalam movies

- Born: Calicut
- Occupation: Director
- Years active: 1996–present
- Spouse: Sheeba Sundar Das
- Children: 2

Sundar Das is an Indian film director in Malayalam movies. He directed more than 10 Malayalam films including Sallapam, Kuberan and Sammanam. The Malayalam actress Manju Warrier debuted with his film Sallapam, which was also his debut film. He took a break after Akasham in 2007 and made a comeback in 2013 with the movie Rebecca Uthup Kizhakkemala.

== Filmography ==
Year	Film	notes
1996	Sallapam	
1997	Kudamaattam	
1997	Sammaanam	
2000	Varnakkazhchakal	
2002	Kuberan	
2004	Kanninum Kannadikkum	
2005	Pauran	
2005	Kadha	
2007	Aakasham	
2013	Rebecca Uthup Kizhakkemala	
2016	Welcome to Central Jail	
