= Aakasham =

- Directed by: Sundar Das
- Written by: T. A. Razzaq
- Starring: Harishree Ashokan; Jyothirmayi
- Cinematography: Sadhath
- Edited by: Bijith Bala
- Music by: Mohan Sithara
- Release date: 14 June 2007
- Running time: 110 minutes
- Country: India
- Language: Malayalam

Aakasham is a 2007 Malayalam-language film directed by Sundar Das and starring Harishree Ashokan.

== Summary ==
Manoharan is hardworking mechanic leading a happy life with his wife Bhanu, kids, mother Lakshmiyamma and brother in law. His greatest dream is to own a house for himself. But his life turns for the worst when the sketch of a person accused in a bomb blast shows a strange resemblance to him. Though everyone is sure that Manoharan is innocent, he himself develops a wild fear, and he absconds from his home.

== Cast ==
- Harisree Ashokan as Manoharan
- Innocent as Varghese Abraham Pathirikkodan
- Sai Kumar as DYSP Raghunandan
- Jyothirmayi as Bhanu
- KPAC Lalitha as Lakshmiyamma
- Baby Nayanthara as Mayakutti
- Jaffar Idukki as Sainuddin
- Mamukkoya as Mammalikka
- Nias Bekker as Jeevan
- Anil Murali as Ramadas
- Subair as Commissioner
- TP Madhavan as Subramaniyam Potti
- Ambika Mohan as Kanakam
- Baiju VK as Baiju
- Dinesh Nair as Autorickshaw driver
- Nisha Sarang as Raghunanandan's wife
- Kozhikode Narayanan Nair as Bhanu's father
- Bindu Panikkar as Bharathi
- KTS Padannayil as Barber
- Vijayan Peringodu as Koyakka
- Majeed as Police officer
