= Namma Preethiya Ramu =

- VCD cover
- Directed by: Sanjay-Vijay
- Based on: Vasanthiyum Lakshmiyum Pinne Njaanum by Vinayan
- Produced by: G Nandakumar; B P Rame Gowda
- Starring: Darshan; Navya Natarajan; Hamsavijetha
- Cinematography: Ramesh Babu
- Edited by: K. Girish Kumar
- Music by: Ilaiyaraaja
- Production company: Vishwapriya Films
- Release date: 14 November 2003
- Running time: 153 minutes
- Country: India
- Language: Kannada

Namma Preethiya Ramu (transl. Our lovable Ramu) is a 2003 Indian Kannada-language drama film directed by Sanjay-Vijay duo. The film is a remake of the Malayalam film Vasanthiyum Lakshmiyum Pinne Njaanum (1999). It stars Darshan playing the eponymous character of a blind village singer, along with Navya Natarajan, Hamsavijetha, Doddanna and Umashree in other prominent roles. The film score and soundtrack were composed by Ilaiyaraaja.

The film was released on 14 November 2003 and won positive reviews from critics upon release, who appreciated Darshan was for his effective portrayal of an offbeat role. However, the film failed at the box office.

== Cast ==
- Darshan as Ramu
- Navya Natarajan as Lakshmi
- Hamsavijetha as Vasanthi
- Doddanna as the restaurant owner
- Umashree as Ramu's mother
- Karibasavaiah
- Pavitra Lokesh
- Nandini
- Ramesh Pandith
- Shyam Yadav
- Hanumanthegowda
- Jayasurya
- Master Adharsh Ramegowda as Putta
- Dr Rathna

== Soundtrack ==
The music of the film was composed by Ilaiyaraaja, and the lyrics were written by K. Kalyan and Krishna Priya. Except "Dudilde" and "Badavana", all other tunes were reused from the Tamil film Kasi.

No.	Title	Lyrics	Singer(s)	Length
1.	"Naa Kano Lokavanu"	Krishna Priya	Udit Narayan
2.	"Nannede Baanali"	K. Kalyan	Hariharan
3.	"Duddilde Hodaru"	K. Kalyan	Udit Narayan, Ganga Sitharasu
4.	"Thegada Mara Kadidu"	K. Kalyan	Hariharan
5.	"Joli Joli Jokaaliyalli"	K. Kalyan	Hariharan
6.	"Badavana Gudisalanu"	K. Kalyan	Ilaiyaraaja

== Reception ==
A critic from Chitraloka.com wrote that "It is Darshan all the way. He takes control of the whole film and he is near to perfection. The shaking of his head, the eye balls looking completely that of a blind, rubbing his finger on the neck his crying the make up maintained for him throughout the film have come out naturally". A critic from Viggy wrote that "Darshan Toogudeep who steals the show with his sterling performance – be it his dry wit or sorrow, happiness or disappointment, he adapted a peculiar style of blind". A critic from indiainfo wrote that "It's all the way Darshan's performance that will be remembered".
