= Welcome to Central Jail =

2016 Malayalam film

- Theatrical release poster
- Directed by: Sundar Das
- Screenplay by: Benny P. Nayarambalam
- Produced by: Vyshakh Rajan
- Starring: Dileep; Renji Panicker; Vedhika; Hareesh Kanaran; Sharaf U Dheen; Naseer Sankranthi; Balachandran Chullikkadu; Kailash
- Cinematography: Alagappan N
- Edited by: Johnkutty
- Music by: Berny-Ignatius; Nadirshah; Nithin P. L.
- Production company: Vaishaka Cynyma
- Distributed by: Vaishaka Cynyma
- Release date: 10 September 2016
- Country: India
- Language: Malayalam
- Box office: est. ₹25.4 crore

Welcome to Central Jail is a 2016 Indian Malayalam-language comedy film written by Benny P. Nayarambalam and directed by Sundar Das. The cinematography is handled by Alagappan N. The film features Dileep and Vedhika in the lead roles, whereas Renji Panicker, Kailash, Aju Varghese, Siddique, Vinaya Prasad and Thesni Khan portray pivotal roles. The film released on 10 September 2016. The film received generally positive response from critics and the film was a commercial success at the box office.

== Plot ==
A simpleton Unnikuttan has an unhealthy attachment with central jail. He was born and brought up there with his father Keshavan and mother Janaki before being transferred to child care facility at the age of six. Unni finds solace and happiness inside jail, for getting in he fills in as a substitute for real-life punishments of petty crimes committed by others. Unni, who is in his late 30s, isn't married and many whom he knows advises him to marry someone to be felt loved and not to go to jail as a substitute. In jail he falls in love with Radhika, and to marry her he tries to solve her problems as she witnessed a murder done by a minister. When he meets Radhika, who is jailed in drug case. She discloses her love to Unnikkuttan but is not now ready because she is awaited by the minister to be killed. She describe all story behind this wrong case against is because that she witnessed the minister murdering Karunan.

It is all that the killer is following her to kill her and for her safety her uncle lie to him that she got a job and boarded to Delhi. When she was in her auntie's home, she saw in TV news that in the same case Simon is jailed. Later she decided to hand over the video clip, she shot in her video camera. As a sudden action she is now arrested. Unnikkuttan gets released in parole, takes the video clip and exposes it to media. Simon thanks Unnikkuttan for proving his innocence. Radhika gets released and the minister is arrested. A new police officer joins the jail as the jail superintendent. He becomes strict to everyone including Unnikkuttan as the superintendent is the minister's man. They send a Hindi guy to kill Unnikkuttan. But he attacks many prisoners and in revenge, Unnikkuttan beats the Hindi guy to death. The superintendent beats Unnikkuttan very brutally and takes his revenge. Jailor Gopinath comes there to save Unnikkuttan. He threatens the superintendent by telling that he will give a complaint against him and the prisoners are witnesses on the incident. Unnikkuttan is taken back to his cell. He decided to not come back to the jail again. Meanwhile, the minister and superintendent sends a guy to kill Radhika. But she kills him in an act of self defence and gets arrested. Meanwhile, Unnikkuttan gets released from the jail and sees Radhika arrested. She reveals about her crime to him. The minister and superintendent humiliates Unnikkuttan by telling that she killed a man whom they sent and came to the jail but they will plan kill her. Angrily, Unnikkuttan kills the minister and superintendent by stabbing them to death and goes to back to the jail. After the chaos, Unnikkuttan marries Radhika in the jail.

== Cast ==
- Dileep as Unnikuttan
- Vedhika as Radhika
- Renji Panicker as Jailer Gopinathan Menon a.k.a. Gopi Sir
- Siddique as Keshavan
- Aju Varghese as Paanji
- Mohan Jose as Baburaj
- Sharaf U Dheen as Dineshan, prisoner
- Kalabhavan Haneef as Ajayan, Minister's assistant
- Kochu Preman as Stephen
- Pradeep Kottayam as Shivan
- Kailash as Simon
- Hareesh Perumanna as Swaminathan aka Swami
- Vinaya Prasad as Janaki
- Thesni Khan as Bhavani
- Veena Nair as Ponnamma
- Kalabhavan Shajohn as Cheriyan
- Sreejith Ravi
- Jubil Rajan P Dev
- Saju Kodiyan as Pushkaran
- Vinod Kedamangalam as Ramesh
- Eloor George as Thorappan Raghavan
- Naseer Sankranthi as Bhaskaran
- Balachandran Chullikadu as Khader
- Kumarakom Raghunath as Jail Superintendent
- Kottayam Manju as Ladies jail warden
- Nandu Pothuval as Ramachandran, Temple committee member
- Chali Pala as Rajeevan, Traffic Police
- Sudheer Sukumaran as Kodanadu Vishwanathan
- Shafique Rahman as Superintendent G Vikram Sait (Neerkoli)
- Jaise Jose as Police officer
- Binu Adimali as Shibu
- Bibin George as Kalari Aashan
- Pauly Valsan as Lady Jailor
- Abu Salim as Prisoner Gopalan
- Dinesh Panicker as Karunan
- Kalabhavan Rahman as Vinayan, Ministers assistant
- Dharmajan Bolgatty as Sugunan
- Guinness Pakru as himself

== Production ==
The film had Sundar Das and Dileep collaborating for the fifth time together, after a gap of 13 years. The filming began on 2 April 2016 in Kochi, most of the parts were shot at Kochi and in the Central Prison, Poojappura in Thiruvananthapuram.

== Soundtrack ==
The film's music was composed by Berny-Ignatius, Nadirshah, and Nithin P. L. The soundtrack album was released by Sony DADC Manufacturing India Pvt. Ltd. on 7 September 2016.

| No. | Title | Singer(s) | Length |
|---|---|---|---|
| 1 | "Police Anu Tharam" | Nadirshah | 03:14 |
| 2 | "Achan Iniyoru Naalum" | Adharsh | 01:54 |
| 3 | "Ravin Chillayil" | Sithara | 05:17 |
| 4 | "Enthanu En Manasile" | Madhu Balakrishnan, Jyotsna Radhakrishnan | 04:14 |
| 5 | "Sundaree" | Shankar Mahadevan, Renjini Jose | 03:59 |
| 6 | "Bye Bye Central Jail" | Samad | 04:07 |

== Box office ==
In its first 25 days of release, the film grossed 25.4 crore at the Kerala box office alone, with the budget of 6.5 crore and the film recorded commercial hit at Box office.

== Release ==
Welcome to Central Jail released in Kerala on 10 September 2016. Its box office has been 25.4 crores within 25 days.
