= Subeesh Sudhi =

Indian film director and actor

Subish Sudhi
- Born: 29 April 1985 (age 41); Ramanthali, Kannur, India
- Occupation: Actor
- Years active: 2006 - present

Subish Sudhi, professionally credited as Subeesh Sudhi, is a Malayalam film actor from Payyanur, Kannur, Kerala.

== Personal life ==
After finishing his studies he moved to Ernakulam to achieve his dream to act in movies. He got his first chance in the movie Classmates.

== Career ==
He made his debut in Lal Jose's film named classmates 2006 As a student in the college. After that Lal Jose directed 12 movies and Subish is a part of 8 films out of 12, So he's basically known as actor of laljose.

Subish Sudhi started his career in the Malayalam film Classmates (2006 film), even though he got a good role in the film Lord Livingstone 7000 Kandi as a massive makeover as a tribal man.

== Filmography ==
Key
†	Denotes films that have not yet been released

Year	Title	Role	Notes
2006	Classmates (2006 film)		
2012	Thattathin Marayathu		
2012	Lord Livingstone 7000 Kandi	Tribal Man	
2015	KL 10 Patthu		
2015	Annayum Rasoolum		
2015	Pullipulikalum Aattinkuttiyum	Babu	
2015	Mariyam Mukku	Chandi	
2015	Ennu Ninte Moideen		
2016	Karutha Joothan		
2017	The Great Father	Narayanan's Nephew	
2017	Oru Mexican Aparatha	Rajeshettan	
2017	Prakasan	Alex	
2017	Aby	Punnoose	
2017	Oru Cinemakkaran	Gokul	
2017	Velipadinte Pusthakam		
2018	Kaly		
2018	Panchavarnathatha	Driver	
2018	B Tech	Kuttan	
2018	Autorsha		
2018	Thattumpurath Achuthan	Suniappan	
2019	Sakalakalashala		
2019	Jimmy Ee Veedinte Aishwaryam	His Highness Sumesh	
2019	Ganagandharvan	Ajayan	
2019	Ulta	Kochu Keshavan	
2019	Nalpathiyonnu (41)		
2021	Black Coffee		
2021	Vellam	Vasu	
2022	Randu		
2022	Aviyal		
2022	Kuri	Jose	
2022	Padavettu	Sasi	
2024	Oru Sarkar Ulpannam		
