= Alagappan N. =

Indian cinematographer (born 1957)

Alagappan N
- Born: 30 November 1957 (age 68); Nagercoil, India
- Education: M.G.R. Government Film and Television Training Institute Chennai; University of Mysore
- Occupations: Cinematographer; film director
- Years active: 1977–present
- Spouse: Uma Alagappan
- Children: Sreenath siva.A(son) .
- Parent(s): Narayana Pillai; Pankajam

Alagappan N is an Indian cinematographer who works primarily in Malayalam films. He received graduate diploma in cinematography from the M.G.R. Government Film and Television Training Institute in Chennai.

== Career ==
He started his career at Doordarshan Kendra, Jalandhar, Doordarshan Kendra, Thiruvananthapuram and Agartala in Tripura, India. In 1997 he made his debut film as a Cinematographer in Sammanam. Then he worked in Agnisakshi, directed by Shyamaprasad. His notable works are Ore Kadal, Vasanthiyum Lakshmiyum Pinne Njaanum, Salute, Soothradharan, Nandanam, Thilakkam, Mizhi Randilum, Gaurisankaram, Manassinakkare, Kaazhcha, Achuvinte Amma, Chandrolsavam, Chanthupottu, Rasathanthram, Prajapathi, Photographer Chotta Mumbai, Irumbukkottai Murattu Singam, Chocolate, Thalappavu, Bumm Bumm Bole, Arike, Oru Marubhoomikkadha, Ozhimuri, Pattam Pole and Welcome to Central Jail.

== Awards ==
Awards for Best Cinematography for Movies

- Kerala State Award for Best Cinematography 1998 – Film – Agnisakshi
- Kerala Film Critics Association Award for Best Cinematography 1999 – Film – Agnisakshi
- Mathrubhumi-Medimix Award 2000 for Best Cinematography 2000 – Film – Vasanthiyum Lakshmiyum Pinne Njaanum
- Kerala Film Critics Association Award for Best Cinematography 2002 – Film – Nandanam
- Mathrubhumi-Medimix Award 2000 for Best Cinematography 2002 – Film – Nandanam
- Asianet Award 2004 for Best Cinematography 2004 – Film – Kaazhcha
- Vanitha Award 2006 for Best Cinematography 2006 – Film – Rasathanthram
- Mathrubhumi Award 2006 for Best Cinematography 2006 – Film – Rasathanthram
- Kala Keralam Award 2006 for Best Cinematography 2006 – Film – Rasathanthram
- Malayalam Movie Award 2007 AMMA held in Dubai for Best Cinematography 2007 – Film – Ore Kadal
- Jeevan TV film Award 2007 for Best Cinematography 2007 – Film – Photographer
- Film Critics Award for Best Cinematography 2007 – Film – Ore Kadal
- SICA Award for Best Cinematography 2007 – Film – Ore Kadal
- Film Critics Award for Best Cinematography 2012 – Film – Ozhimuri

Awards for Television
Kerala State Government Awards for Best Cameraman

- Uyarthezhunnelppu- 1993
- Maratam Durbalam - 1996
- Ganitham - 1997
- Thottagal - 1998

Onida Pinnacle National Awards for Best Cameraman

- Nilavariyunnu - 1995

Centre for Media Studies Awards for Best Cameraman

- Maratam Durbalam - 1997

Film Critics Awards for Best Cameraman

- ANNA - 2000

Kerala State Television Awards for Best Director

- ANNA - 2000

== Jury Chairman ==
No	Year	Title
1	2012	5th International Documentary and Short film festival Kerala
2	2013	Kerala State Govt Television Awards
3	2017	Kerala State, Kerala Calling Photography Competition
4	2017	Information Public Relations of Kerala, Online video film Competition MIZHIV
5	2019	Kerala State Children Educational Film Festival Awards
6	2019	Jury Member of Flowers Television Awards
7		All India Press Photographers Award, Press Club Trivandrum

== Guest interactive faculty ==
- GRD College Coimbatore
- C DIT, Trivandram
- LV Prasad Film Institute, Trivandram and Chennai
- Revathy Kalamandir Film Academy, Trivandram
- Asianet News Trainees
- Flowers Academy Media Science
- KR Narayan National Institute of Visual Science
- Elements of Cinema Film School, Kochi

== Filmography ==
Year	Film	Notes
1997	Sammanam	
1998	Meenakshi Kalyanam	
1999	Agnisakshi	
1999	Vasanthiyum Lakshmiyum Pinne Njaanum	
2001	Jeevan Masai	
2001	Soothradharan	
2002	Nandanam	
2003	Thilakkam	
2003	Mizhi Randilum	
2003	Meerayude Dukhavum Muthuvinte Swapnavum	
2003	Gaurisankaram	
2003	Manassinakkare	
2004	Kaazhcha	
2005	Achuvinte Amma	
2005	Ponmudipuzhayorathu	
2005	Chandrolsavam	
2005	Chanthupottu	
2006	Rasathanthram	
2006	Prajapathi	
2006	Photographer	
2007	Chotta Mumbai	
2007	Ore Kadal	
2007	Chocolate	
2008	Thalappavu	
2010	Irumbukkottai Murattu Singam	
2010	Bumm Bumm Bole	
2010	Paattinte Palazhy	
2011	China Town	
2011	Swapna Sanchari	
2011	Oru Marubhoomikkadha	
2012	Arike	
2012	101 Weddings	
2012	Ozhimuri	
2013	Pattam Pole	Also director
2015	To Noora with Love	
2015	The Reporter	
2016	Welcome to Central Jail	
2017	Aakashamittayee	
2018	Drama	
2019	Ganagandharvan	
2019	Swarna Malsyangal	
2020	Varthamanam	
