= Sammanam (1997 film) =

- Directed by: Sundar Das
- Written by: C. V. Balakrishnan
- Produced by: N. Krishnakumar (Kireedam Unni)
- Starring: Manoj K. Jayan; Manju Warrier; Kalabhavan Mani
- Cinematography: Alagappan N
- Edited by: N.Gopalakrishnan
- Music by: Johnson
- Release date: 1997
- Country: India
- Language: Malayalam

Sammanam is a 1997 Malayalam-language Indian feature film directed by Sundar Das, starring Manoj K. Jayan, Manju Warrier and Kalabhavan Mani in lead roles. This is the debut film of Alagappan N as cinematographer.

== Cast ==
- Kaithapram Damodaran Namboothiri as Thirumeni
- Keezhoottu Sreekandan as Appu.
- Manoj K. Jayan as Vishwan
- Manju Warrier as Rajalakshmi
- Kalabhavan Mani as Moidu
- Bindu Panicker
- K. B. Ganesh Kumar
- Kannur Sreelatha as Aminamma
- Kaviyoor Renuka as Subhadramma
- Mala Aravindan as Ramashan
- Mamukkoya
- NF Varghese as Vasudevan
- Salu Koottanad as Shankarankutty
- Vishnuprakash

== Soundtrack ==
All the Lyrics were penned by Kaithapram and music composed by Johnson

- "Mampulli Marukulla" – Sujatha Mohan
- "Devi Ennum Neeyen" – K. J. Yesudas, K. S. Chithra
- "Poovaalthumbi" – K. J. Yesudas
- Njalippurakkale" – Kalabhavan Mani
