= Keshu Ee Veedinte Nadhan =

2021 film directed by Nadirshah

- Official release poster
- Directed by: Nadirshah
- Written by: Sajeev Pazhoor
- Produced by: Dileep; Dr. Zachariah Thomas
- Starring: Dileep; Urvashi; Kalabhavan Shajohn
- Narrated by: Salim Kumar
- Cinematography: Anil Nair
- Edited by: V. Saajan
- Music by: Songs: Nadirshah; Background Score: Bijibal
- Production companies: Nad Group; UGM Entertainment; Grand Production
- Distributed by: Disney+ Hotstar
- Release date: December 31, 2021
- Running time: 142 minutes
- Country: India
- Language: Malayalam

Keshu Ee Veedinte Nadhan (transl. Keshu, the Guardian of this house) is a 2021 Indian malayalam comedy drama film directed by Nadirshah. The film stars Dileep in the title role. It was originally scheduled for a theatrical release but was cancelled due COVID-19 pandemic. The film was released on 31 December 2021 through Disney+ Hotstar in four languages and received mixed reviews from critics and audience.

== Plot ==
The film revolves around Keshavan alias Keshu, a driving instructor. He is the eldest among his siblings and had been working hard without any rest for the sake of the family after the death of his father. He blames his deceased father for his sufferings which is disowned by his mother, who requests him to do the last rites of his father by immersing the ashes of his father at Rameswaram. The whole family, including Keshu's cunning brothers-in-law, Rajendran, Gopi and Vijayan Pillai plans to go Rameswaram as a trip where they will do the last rites. Keshu's daughter Usha calls a tourist bus upon her boyfriend Vivek's careoff and they leave for the trip happily. On the way to Rameswaram, Keshu learns that a lottery which he had bought from a dealer upon compulsion have won the prize money of ₹12 crore which turns Keshu's life into a new twist as he plans to escape with his family alone not informing the cunning relatives. Keshu and his wife Rathnamma alias Rathnam tried to convince their children about escaping. But Usha doesn't listen and tries to stay. She then calls Vivek and sends him the location. He finds where they are and Keshu and his family had no other choice and had to enter into the bus. Also on the night of the escape, Keshu tells Rathnam to tell the reason of escaping from this trip where Usha gets shocked. She then forgets about Vivek and at the same moment his brother in-laws are planning to not let them escape from the hotel. But as time passes, they manage to escape when they slept as they were drunk.

They arrive home and learn that everyone knows that Keshu won the lottery and everyone is waiting at his home with the police. Keshu calls Ganapathi, the lottery agent and Kunjikrishnan's brother inside to give the ticket. Keshu realises that he took three tickets and there are only two tickets. The third ticket was the one he won. Rathnam is shocked as she thinks that he lost the lottery ticket. Everyone overhears it and the police tells Keshu and Ganapathi to call few people and search the house. During the search, Keshu finds a photo of him with a young girl Leeela, his ex-girlfriend who ran away with a photographer and recollects his past. When Rathnam sees the photo, she thinks that Keshu hid the lottery ticket for her and to live happily with her. She becomes angry at him and threatens that if the ticket is not found, then she will kill both Keshu and Leela.

At the same, Keshu's brothers-in-law and sister arrive on the bus. Usha tries to reconcile with Vivek but he is angered and breaks up with her. Umesh tells her a doubt that he might have wrote a love letter in the lottery ticket and sent to a girl who is their neighbour. Usha slaps Umesh when she finds. Keshu's brothers-in-law finds this and tries to find the lottery ticket by making rocket with few tickets. The girl's mother sees this and learns about Umesh's affair with her daughter. She gets angry and hits her daughter, which Umesh witnesses and Keshu tells him that because of him, his life has a problem like this. Rathnam sees this and asks where Leela is and she won't allow him to spend a night. When she sees the girl's mother hitting her, she thinks that Keshu told them about his affair with Leela. She takes him inside the room and tells that she is going to leave him alone and teach a lesson. As he couldn't tolerate the torture, Keshu locks Rathnam in a room and moves out. He tells Umesh to make a paper rocket and throw it to the same place where he threw the lottery ticket to the girl. It launches and gets stuck in the tree. A group of people climbs and checks the tree for the lottery ticket and finds many letters written by Umesh and the girl's mother misunderstands and slaps her. Later they realises that Umesh wrote the letters on a paper not the lottery ticket. Ganapathi tells Keshu that his neighbour and ex-goon Biju might have stolen the lottery ticket and hidden it somewhere. Keshu's brothers-in-law and Ganapathi takes Keshu goes to Biju's house. Meanwhile, Rathnam escapes from room and catches them. She thinks that Keshu was taking everyone to Leela's house to live with her. When she finds out that they are going take the lottery ticket, she forces them that she will also come, but Keshu refuses. She then tells Keshu to not go to the place where she will also come. When Rajendran asks what has happened, Keshu says that she is mad. When Vijayan Pillai tells her to keep calm, she tells bad about Vijayan Pillai's father. In a fit of rage, Keshu pushes Rathnam to the ground, where she hits her head and becomes unconscious. Keshu takes Biju and asks him personally about the lottery ticket. Biju tells that he didn't take and hide the lottery ticket. Meanwhile, Keshu accidentally stabs Biju with a knife, when he stepped on a coconut and was about to slips. Everyone thinks that Keshu tried to kill him purposely and did it for the lottery ticket. One man says that he tried to kill Rathnam and she is hospitalized. He blackmails Keshu that he will complain to the police, as Keshu didn't allow him to say it. Keshu's brothers-in-law escape from the scene as everyone knows that they brought Keshu there and if Biju dies in the hospital, they will be arrested for helping Keshu kill him. Keshu is arrested and imprisoned, but is released after 14 days on bail as Biju survived and he says that Keshu made an accident.

Keshu returns to his house. Usha tells him that Rathnam lost her speaking ability due to the shock when he pushed her. Usha blames Keshu for this and their life was ruined due to his behaviour. Keshu becomes very sad and heartbroken hearing this. He goes to Rathnam, apologies for pushing her and they both reconciles. Keshu's sisters and brothers-in-law arrive with his mother and instructs them to divide the properties, he responds that his mother will decide. When Rajendran calls Keshu's mother a trophy, Keshu is angered and scolds them. He says that he only wants some peace and expels them from the house. Keshu decides to take care of his mother and he decides to complete his father's last rites. Keshu's brothers-in-law are now in need of the lottery ticket and they goes to a bank and they realise that Keshu took a loan but didn't repay it. They are now thinking Keshu might have lost the lottery ticket and Vijayan Pillai tells them to not go after the lottery ticket as they will become responsible for Keshu's debts. One night, Keshu's associate George comes there and tells that Biju's brothers-in-law have came to take revenge on Keshu. Keshu goes to Rameswaram to do his father's last rites with Rathnam. On the train, Ganapathi calls him and tells he needs money for all requirements he made when Keshu won the lottery otherwise he will die. Keshu tells him to not go after the lottery as it is not made for him and he will clear their debts even after selling Usha's jewelleries made for her marriage, which made Rathnam so sad.

At Rameswaram temple, while Keshu goes to immerse his father's ashes at the pond, Keshu retrieves the lottery ticket which he won. He realises that when he was packing to go to Rameswaram, he kept the pot which contains his father's ashes on the lottery ticket. Keshu becomes very happy and tells this to Rathnam. She also becomes happy and gets back her voice. When Keshu makes her to say something, she asks him who is Leela, implying that her suspicions has not changed. She is now believing that Keshu will take the money and live with Leela to which she won't allow and creates a big scene. On the way back home, she kept on torturing and disturbing Keshu which the other passengers witnesses. Keshu gets a call from Ganapathi and when he was about to take the call, Rathnam takes it and tells him to cut the call as she thinks that Leela was the one who called him. She tells him that she will take care of the phone and nobody else than the god is with her. She is now deciding to kill Leela. Keshu tries to calm her by telling that the god gave the lottery ticket back and with that he can help others. He wants to do anything good for his brothers-in-law and sisters and give Biju something, but she tells to give anything to anybody but what is he going to give Leela and without answering it she won't leave him.

An ending vocal says that even though the lottery's issue is solved, Keshu's life is still remaining as Leela's issue is not solved.

== Cast ==
- Dileep in a dual role
  - Keshavan (Keshu)
  - himself
  - He also appear as Keshu's father (photo)
- Naslen as Umesh, Keshu's and Rathnam's son
- Urvashi as Rathnamma (Rathnam), Keshu's wife and Usha's and Umesh's mother
- Vaishnavi Venugopal as Usha, Keshu's and Rathnam's daughter
- Kalabhavan Shajohn as Rajendran, Keshu's second brother -in-law
- Kottayam Naseer as Gopi, Keshu's youngest brother-in-law
- Hareesh Kanaran as lottery agent Ganapathi, Kunjikrishnan's brother
- Jaffar Idukki as Vijayan Pillai, Keshu's eldest brother-in-law
- Seema G. Nair as Keshu's eldest sister and Vijayan Pillai's wife
- Priyanka Anoop as Lalitha, Keshu's second sister and Rajendran's wife
- Swasika as Suma, Keshu's youngest sister and Gopi's wife
- Valsala Menon as Keshu's mother
- Harisree Ashokan as Kunjikrishnan
- Ganapathi S Poduval as Vivek, Usha's boyfriend
- Binu Adimali as George, Keshu's associate
- Mohan Jose as ex-goon Biju
- Shiny T. Rajan as Biju's wife
- Sudhi Kollam as Assistant Director Printu
- Chali Pala as Police Inspector Sumesh
- Anusree as Leela (Yakshi), Keshu's ex-girlfriend (cameo in Narangamittayi song)
- Kalabhavan Prajod as Leela's love interest (cameo)
- Kochu Preman as Rajendran's father (cameo)
- Johny Antony as a vehicle inspector (cameo)
- Nadirshah as a shop owner (cameo)
- Salim Kumar as the narrator
- Eloor George
- Nandhu Pothuval
- Maja Sandhya
- Ramesh Kurumassery as Sreedharan
- Arun Punalur

== Music ==
Keshu Ee Veedinte Nadhan

Soundtrack album by Nadirshah
- Released: 2021
- Recorded: 2021
- Genre: Feature film soundtrack
- Length: 13:14
- Language: Malayalam
- Label: Millennium Audios
- Director: Nadirshah
- Producers: Dileep; Dr. Zachariah Thomas

Singles from Keshu Ee Veedinte Nadhan
- 1. "Naranga Muttayi" Released: 18 August 2021; 2. "Punnarapoonkattil" Released: 10 December 2021; 3. "Engandokke Poyalum" Released: 6 January 2022

The music of the film is composed by Nadirshah. The lyrics are written by Nadirshah and Sujesh Hari. The first single,"Naaranga Muttaayi" was released on 18 August 2021. The second single, "Punnarapoonkattil" was released on 10 December 2021.

Tracklist
No.	Title	Lyrics	Singer(s)	Length
1.	"Naaranga Muttaayi"	Nadirshah	Dileep	6:08
2.	"Punnarapoonkattil"	Sujesh Hari	K. J. Yesudas	2:57
3.	"Engandokke Poyalum"	B K Harinarayanan	Kannur Shereef	4:09
Total length:				13:14

== Release ==
The film was originally scheduled for a theatrical release, but due to COVID-19 pandemic it was announced that the film would be directly released on Disney+ Hotstar on 31 December 2021 in Malayalam, Tamil, Telugu and Hindi. It is the second Malayalam film to be premiered through the platform's Disney+ Hotstar Multiplex initiative.

== Reception ==
Reviewer Anna Mathews of Times of India stated, " With its good comic and emotional moments, and its message, this is a movie that everyone in the family will enjoy watching together."
