= Kadha =

2005 Malayalam film by Sundar Das

- Directed by: Sundar Das
- Written by: Vashya Vachas
- Produced by: Menaka; Keerthy Suresh
- Starring: Prithviraj Sukumaran; Kavya Madhavan
- Cinematography: M. Venugopal
- Edited by: L. Bhoominathan
- Music by: Ouseppachan
- Production company: Revathy Kalamandhir
- Distributed by: Friends-Anju Films Release
- Release date: 2005
- Country: India
- Language: Malayalam

Kadha (transl. Story) is a 2005 Indian Malayalam-language film directed by Sundar Das and starring Prithviraj Sukumaran, and Kavya Madhavan. The film features music composed by Ouseppachan.

== Plot ==
Madhava Menon and his wife Sethulekshmi eventually have a son after being childless for a period. They cared for their son Nandu, who grows up to be a mischievous and playful youth. Madhava Menon wants Nandu to become a doctor, but he is not interested. His life changes after Meera enters his life.

== Cast ==
- Prithviraj Sukumaran as Nandhan Menon (Nandu)
- Kavya Madhavan as Meera
- Janardhanan as Madhava Menon, Nandu's father
- Indrans as Dr. Aravindaksha Kaimal
- Mala Aravindan as Achumaman
- Oduvil Unnikrishnan as Panchayat President
- Abbas as Gautham, Meera's love interest
- Narendra Prasad as Raghavan Nambiar, Meera's father
- Sabumon Abdusamad as Gopan

== Production ==
The film was in production as of April 2004. The film was produced by G. Suresh Kumar's Revathy Kalamandhir.

== Soundtrack ==
The film's music was composed by Ouseppachan, with lyrics penned by Gireesh Puthenchery. The soundtrack consists of nine songs.

Songs
Song	Singers	Raga
Mazhayulla Raathriyil [F]	Sujatha Mohan	
Mazhayulla Raathriyil [M]	Vidhu Prathap	
Oduvilee Sandhyayum Njaanum	G Venugopal	Desh
Oduvilee Sandhyayum Njaanum [D]	G Venugopal, K. S. Chithra, Chorus	
Oduvilee Sandhyayum Njaanum [F]	K. S. Chithra	Kaapi
Thathum Thathakal	Asha G Menon	Madhyamavathi
Vaarmegha	Franco Simon Neelankavil	
Vaarmegha [Instrumental]	Ouseppachan	
Yaathrayaavumee Hemantham	Santhosh Keshav	

== Release ==
The film was released directly on television during Onam 2005.
