= Kabadi Kabadi (2008 film) =

Malayalam film

- Official poster
- Directed by: Sudheer-Manu
- Starring: Kalabhavan Mani; Mukesh; Rambha
- Music by: Nadirshah; Ram Surender
- Release date: 14 February 2008
- Country: India
- Language: Malayalam

Kabadi Kabadi is a 2008 Indian Malayalam comedy film directed by the duo Sudheer-Manu and starring Kalabhavan Mani, Mukesh and Rambha. The film was a commercial hit.

== Cast ==
- Kalabhavan Mani as SI Madhavankutty
- Mukesh as SI Vijayan
- Rambha in a dual role as:
  - Pooja, Madhavankutty's love interest
  - Sneha, Vijayan's love interest
- Suraj Venjaramoodu as Rameshan
- Harisree Ashokan as Biju
- Jaffar Idukki as Makri Velayudhan
- Indrans as Basheer
- Bheeman Raghu as Padaveetil Chithrangathan
- Mani C. Kappan as Retired Justice Vishwanathan, Pooja and Sneha's father
- Bose Venkat as CI Yatheendran(Main Antagonist)
- Besant Ravi as Pothu
- Chali Pala as Udumpu Devasiyya
- Ajith Kollam as Kallan Pathrose
- Kochu Preman as Head Constable Sasidharan Nair

== Music ==
The music for the film was composed by Nadirshah and Ram Surender.

Track listing
| No. | Title | Lyrics | Music | Singer(s) | Length |
|---|---|---|---|---|---|
| 1. | "Minnaminunge (Male)" | Baburaj Tripunithura | Nadirshah | Kalabhavan Mani | 4:52 |
| 2. | "Njanoru Rajavayal" | Nadirshah | Nadirshah | Vineeth Sreenivasan, Rimi Tomy | 5:04 |
| 3. | "Mathappu Mathappu" | Jophi Tharakan | Ram Surender | Kalabhavan Mani | 5:06 |
| 4. | "Minnaminunge (Female)" | Baburaj Tripunithura | Nadirshah | Amrutha Suresh | 4:52 |
| 5. | "Porattam Therottam" | Chitoor Gopi | Nadirshah | Predeep Raju, Sammad | 3:31 |
| Total length: | | | | | 23:25 |

== Reception ==
Paresh C. Palicha of Rediff.com wrote that "All seen and suffered, this is one movie where its okay to give it a miss". A critic from Indiaglitz wrote that "All in all, this old fashioned movie can be a time pass for those who love to laugh even for hollow wits. 'Kabadi Kabadi' can be your film of the week, if you have got nothing much of any importance to do". A critic from Sify stated that "The old fashioned jokes, choreography and even the music are pointers that give a clear inkling about the problems with Kabadi Kabadi. That it has come out at least some twenty good years late".
