= Dinesh Prabhakar =

Indian actor

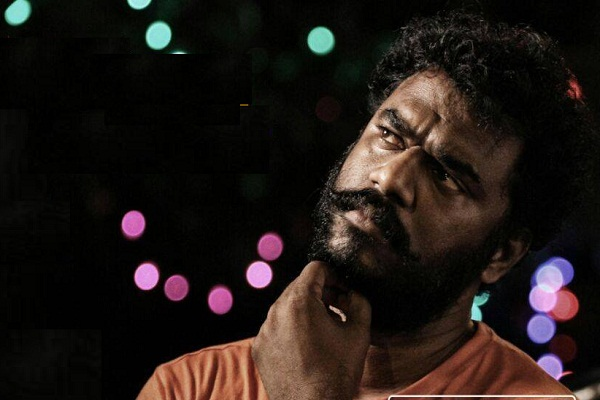
- Dinesh Prabhakar
- Born: Dinesh Nair; Perumbavoor, Ernakulam, Kerala, India
- Occupations: Actor; casting director
- Years active: 2002 – present
- Spouse: Sreerekha Dinesh
- Children: Vibha Nair
- Parents: Prabhakaran Nair (father); Sarojini Amma (mother)

Dinesh Prabhakar, also known by his birth name Dinesh Nair, is an Indian actor who predominantly appears in Malayalam films.

== Early life ==
Dinesh was born as the second child of Prabhakaran Nair and Sarojini Amma at Pulluvazhi, Perumbavoor, Ernakulam, Kerala. He was passionate about Cinema and Media from childhood itself. This passion tempted him to discontinue his studies during his college years at Sree Sankara College. Passionate about movies and fascinated by Hindi language during school days, heavily influenced by the Doordarshan serials like Circus (Indian TV series), Humraahi, Tamas (film) and the programs like Chitrahaar & Surabhi (TV series) he then moved to Mumbai in the early 1990s where his elder sister stays. He started work as a medical shop assistant for a living along with learning Hindi. Life in Mumbai played a major role in helping his growth in acting, dubbing and casting. During his stay in Mumbai he was eagerly trying to get into the silverscreen but in vain. His movie career started with a small role in the film Meesa Madhavan in 2002. This role helped him to bag couple of more roles in mainstream Malayalam films. Meanwhile, along with his fellow dubbing artist and friend Jismon, he started an advertisement agency.

== Career ==
Prabhakar started his film career as a dubbing artist for many popular Ad films. He had lent his voice for most of the popular ads which featured Sharukh Khan, Aamir Khan & Amitabh Bachan in the Malayalam versions. Meanwhile along with fellow dubbing artist and friend Jis Joy, he started an advertisement agency. Dubbing and the advertisement agency became his pathway to the movie industry. He is considered as the first casting director of Malayalam film industry.

== Personal life ==
Dinesh is married to Sreerekha. They have a daughter Vibha Nair who is studying now .

== Filmography ==
=== As actor ===
==== Malayalam films ====
Year	Title	Role	Notes
2002	Meesa Madhavan	Manoharan	
2002	Nammal	College student	
2003	Pattalam	Satheeshan	
2003	Swapnakoodu	Anpazhakan	
2004	Rasikan	Raj Kumar	
2005	Thaskaraveeran	Villager	
2005	Rappakal	Govindan	
2006	Karutha Pakshikal	Babu	
2008	Thalappavu	Dinesh	
2010	Aagathan	Dasappan	
2010	Best Actor	Assistant Director	
2012	Matinee		
2012	Mullassery Madhavan Kutty Nemom P. O.		
2012	Namukku Parkkan		
2012	Orange		
2013	God for Sale	Hari	
2013	Left Right Left	Anil	
2013	Pullipulikalum Aattinkuttiyum	Adv. Ashokan	
2014	1983	Saji a.k.a. Ambrose Saji	
2014	Beware of dogs	Freddy	
2014	Money Ratnam	Cleetus	
2014	Samsaaram Aarogyathinu Haanikaram	Chettupara Sasi	
2014	Homely Meals	Lalan	
2015	Ayal Njanalla	Christopher Vasco	
2015	Jamna Pyari	Aadu Thoma	
2015	Kohinoor	St Johnson	
2015	Kunjiramayanam	Ramachandran	
2015	Love 24x7	Channel Employee	
2015	Lukka Chuppi	Benny Chacko	
2015	Pathemari	Sudhakaran	
2015	Premam	Lonappan	
2015	Rockstar	Rarichan	
2015	Two Countries	Driver	Cameo appearance
2016	Jacobinte Swargarajyam	Sijoy	
2016	Kavi Uddheshichathu..?		
2016	Kolamass		
2016	Kolumittayi		
2016	Monsoon Mangoes	Reporter	
2016	Oozham	Selvam	
2016	Paavada	Thattukada Kunjumon	
2017	Solo	Prabha	
2017	Sherlock Toms	Cost Gangu	
2018	Aami	Angry Husband of Madhavikutty fan	
2019	Sathyam Paranja Viswasikkuvo	Prasad	
2019	Prakashante Metro		
2019	Sayanna Varthakal	Pavithran	
2021	Drishyam 2	Rajan	
2021	Malik	Peter Esthappan	
2022	Bro Daddy	James	
2022	The Teacher	Vishwambaran	
2022	Veekam		
2023	Garudan	Saji	
2023	Neru	Robin	
2024	Kunddala Puranam		
2024	Nunakkuzhi	Gunda Shaji	
2024	Pallotty 90's Kids	Dasan	
2024	Marco	CI Ashok, an Investigating officer	
2025	Get-Set Baby		
2025	Thudarum	Jeep co-driver	Cameo appearance
2025	Written & Directed by God		
2026	Spa		
2026	Dridam	CPO Sathyan	
2026	Drishyam 3	Rajan	
2026	Pluto	Professor	

==== Other language films ====
+Key	†	Denotes films that have not yet been released

Year	Film	Role	Language
2013	Madras Cafe	LTF (Based on LTTE) Militant	Hindi
2015	Waiting	Lucky	Hindi
2017	Chef	Alex Oomen	Hindi
2017	Solo	Prabha	Tamil
2019	Nerkonda Paarvai	Police Inspector Kandhasamy	Tamil
2019	Bakrid	Sundaram	Tamil
2022	Valimai	DCP Rajangam	Tamil
2022	Rocketry: The Nambi Effect	L. D. Gopal	Tamil; Hindi
2022	Sardar	Chittagong prison guard	Tamil

=== As casting director ===
+Key	†	Denotes films that have not yet been released

Year	Film
2013	Thira
2015	Lukka Chuppi
2016	Jacobinte Swargarajyam

=== As dubbing artist ===
Dubbed for Malayalam version
Year	Film	Actor
2013	Amen	Makarand Deshpande
2015	Two Countries	Makarand Deshpande
2015	Double Barrel	African
2015	Laddoo	Charlie
2016	Devi	Prabhu Deva
2016	Pulimurugan	Makarand Deshpande
2022	PS: I	Vikram Prabhu

== Television ==
Year	Title	Role	Language	Notes
2019	The Family Man	Asif	Hindi	Web series
