= Vasanthiyum Lakshmiyum Pinne Njaanum =

- Promotional poster
- Directed by: Vinayan
- Written by: J. Pallassery (dialogues)
- Screenplay by: J. Pallassery Johnson Esthappan
- Story by: Vinayan
- Produced by: Kabeer; Latheef; Vindhyan
- Starring: Kalabhavan Mani; Kaveri; Praveena; Sai Kumar
- Cinematography: Alagappan N.
- Edited by: G. Murali
- Music by: Mohan Sithara
- Production company: Thriveni Productions
- Distributed by: Sargam Speed Release
- Release date: 27 May 1999
- Country: India
- Language: Malayalam
- Budget: ₹45 lakhs
- Box office: ₹3.85 crores

Vasanthiyum Lakshmiyum Pinne Njaanum (transl. Vasanthi, Lakshmi, and me) is a 1999 Indian Malayalam-language musical romantic tragedy film directed by Vinayan, written by Johnson Esthappan and J. Pallassery who also wrote the dialogues, based on a story by Vinayan. The film features Kalabhavan Mani, Kaveri, Praveena and Sai Kumar. Kabeer, Latheef and Vindhyan produced the film under Thriveni Productions and Kabeer and it was also distributed by Sargam Speed Release. The film centers around Ramu, a blind poet and singer whose singing supports his family. His family's happiness dissipates after he gets cheated by a rich businessman-turned-politician. The film is reported to be inspired from Dosti (1964).

The film was a commercial success and ran for more than 150 days in theatres. It won two National Film Awards, the Best Male Playback Singer for M. G. Sreekumar and the Special Jury Award for Kalabhavan Mani and Mani also received the Special Jury Award at the Kerala State Film Awards for his performance in the film. The film also won two Asianet Film Awards: Best Actor for Kalabhavan Mani and Best Supporting Actress for Praveena. The film was remade to Tamil as Kasi, in Telugu as Seenu Vasanthi Lakshmi and in Kannada as Namma Preethiya Ramu.

== Plot ==
Ramu is a blind poet and talented singer who supports his family with his songs. He has a drunkard older brother Chandru; an abusive, crippled father Bhargavan; and a younger sister Vasanthi. When the local landlord and Ex-MP Thomas Chacko, returns to the district, he brings along Vinod Bhaskar, a union minister's son, and his wife Jayanthi. Thomas is known as a god in the area for his charitable work. When a specialist eye doctor arrives, he promises to pay the operation fees to restore Ramu's vision. Elated by the news, Ramu learns he must find an eye donor. His lover Lakshmi, who cannot speak, offers one of her eyes. Unfortunately, it turns out that the "god-like" Thomas is not what he seems. Blissfully unaware of the sadness of those around him, Ramu looks forward to his surgery. On the day of her wedding, Vasanthi is found dead. It is revealed that Vasanthi committed suicide because she was raped by Thomas. When Thomas comes to attend the funeral, Ramu explains to Thomas what the latter did while choking him to death.

== Cast ==
- Kalabhavan Mani as Ramu
- Kaveri as Lakshmi, Vasanthi's friend and Ramu's lover
  - Manjusha Mohandas as younger Lakshmi
- Praveena as Vasanthi, Ramu's Sister and Lakshmi's friend
  - Swathy Narayanan as younger Vasanthi
- Vani Viswanath as Jayanthi
- Bharath Gopi as Bhargavan, Ramu's father
- Sai Kumar as Ex-MP Thomas Chacko
- Indrans as Unni Balan
- Janardhanan as Krishnan Nair / Krishnettan
- Meghanathan as Chandru, Ramu's older brother
- Priya
- Krishnakumar as Vinod Bhaskar
- Augustine as Sivankutty
- Meena Ganesh as Ramu's mother
- Priyanka Anoop as Ramu's sister
- Omana Ouseph as Lakshmi's mother
- Master Vignesh as Lakshmi's brother

== Soundtrack ==
Vasanthiyum Lakshmiyum Pinne Njaanum

Soundtrack album by Mohan Sithara
- Released: 1999
- Recorded: Sargam Speed Audios
- Genre: Feature film soundtrack
- Label: Sargam
- Producer: Thriveni Productions

The soundtrack consists of a total of 10 songs. The film score and all the songs were composed by Mohan Sithara, with lyrics from Yusef Ali Kecheri. It was released on 20 May 1999 as an album on the Sargam Speed Audios label. The song Aalilakkanna Ninte Muralika is picturized on Kalabhavan Mani. The song Aalilakkanna Ninte Muralika is set in the Sindhu Bhairavi raga, while the song Kannuneerinum Chirikkanariyam is set in the Yamunakalyani raga. M. G. Sreekumar got the National Film Award for Best Male Playback Singer the second time for the song Chanthupottum Chankelassum for a heartwarming rendition of the song. All the film's songs were chartbusters and stayed in the charts for several months following its release. The film is known for revitalizing the folk music genre in Malayalam cinema. The rights of the cassette were sold for ₹30 lakhs.

=== Track listing ===
Song	Singer(s)	Raga(s)
"Aalilakkanna Ninte Muralika"	K. J. Yesudas	Sindhu Bhairavi
"Prakrutheeshwari"	K. J. Yesudas	
"Thenanu Nin Swaram"	K. S. Chithra	
"Chanthupottum Chankelassum"	M. G. Sreekumar	
"Kattile Maninte Tholukondundakki"	Kalabhavan Mani	
"Thengapoolum Kokkilothukki"	K. J. Yesudas, Sujatha Mohan	
"Thengapoolum Kokkilothukki"	K. J. Yesudas	
"Kannuneerinum Chirikkanariyam"	K. J. Yesudas	Yamunakalyani
"Thenanu Nin Swaram"	K. J. Yesudas	
"Aalilakkanna Ninte Muralika"	K. S. Chithra	Sindhu Bhairavi

== Reception ==
=== Critical reception ===
The film received mostly positive reviews from critics. Noted director Hariharan, after watching the film in a theatre in Kozhikode called Vinayan and appreciated him for his work in the film. The Times of India praised Kalabhavan Mani's performance writing:" Ramu from Vasanthiyum Lakshmiyum Pinne Njanum is undeniably one of the most challenging roles in Kalabhavan Mani's acting career. We have seen many actors playing the role of visually challenged individuals on screen, but Kalabhavan Mani's character Ramu stands out. Be it the way he controlled his eye movements or his acting chops especially in the intense emotional scenes, Kalabhavan Mani made the audience fall for him. The actor managed to ace the role with sheer determination and perfection." Kalabhavan Mani also won the Special Jury Award at the National Film Awards for a sensitive and realistic portrayal of a blind man complete with his behavioral and gestural distortions as he copes with difficulties in making life meaningful. Sify writes, praising Vinayan's direction: "Vinayan began with a theme that has been common in the Malayalam films of 60's and an unbelievable story line. But he could present it in a touching way that even the most iron-hearted could not help burst into tears. The full credit goes to Vinayan from preventing the story turning into a melodrama."

=== Box office ===
Expectations for Vasanthiyum Lakshmiyum Pinne Njaanum was low. The film opened to near-empty halls and by the end of the first week, all theaters were houseful for every show. It had an extraordinary run, running for more than 100 days in many centers. The film was a commercial success. The film was made on a budget of ₹45 lakhs and grossed around ₹3.5 crores at the box office.

== Awards ==
=== National Film Awards ===
- National Film Award for Best Male Playback Singer - M. G. Sreekumar
- National Film Award – Special Jury Award - Kalabhavan Mani

=== Kerala State Film Awards ===
- Kerala State Film Award – Special Jury Award - Kalabhavan Mani

=== Asianet Film Awards ===
- Asianet Film Award for Best Actor - Kalabhavan Mani
- Asianet Film Award for Best Supporting Actress - Praveena

== Remakes ==
Vasanthiyum Lakshmiyum Pinne Njaanum was remade in Tamil as Kasi (2001), in Kannada as Namma Preethiya Ramu (2003) and in Telugu as Seenu Vasanthi Lakshmi (2004).
