= Lukka Chuppi =

2015 Malayalam drama film

- Theatrical release poster
- Directed by: Bash Mohammed
- Screenplay by: Gafoor Arackkal
- Story by: Bash Mohammed
- Produced by: Bash Mohammed; Sheeja Muthaleef
- Starring: Jayasurya; Murali Gopy; Joju George; Remya Nambeesan; Chinnu Kuruvilla; Muthumani; Dinesh Prabhakar; Asmita Sood
- Cinematography: Binu Bhaskar
- Edited by: Manoj
- Music by: Bijibal
- Production company: Feel Reel Cinemas
- Distributed by: August Cinema
- Release date: 5 June 2015
- Running time: 112 minutes
- Country: India
- Language: Malayalam

Lukka Chuppi (transl. Hide and Seek) is a 2015 Indian Malayalam-language drama film co-produced and directed by Bash Mohammed (in his directorial debut) and written by Gafoor Arackkal from a story by Mohammed. The film features an ensemble cast led by Jayasurya, Murali Gopy, Joju George, Ramya Nambeeshan, Chinnu Kuruvila, Muthumani, Dinesh Prabhakar, and Asmita Sood. The plot features the reunion of a group of friends from college after 14 years, reviving episodes from their past and how it affects their present life. The entire film was shot in an artificially created resort in Thrissur.

Lukka Chuppi was released in India on 5 June 2015. It opened to positive reviews from critics, particularly for the dialogues and performances. Jayasurya received a Special Mention at the 63rd National Film Awards. The film won two awards at the 46th Kerala State Film Awards—Special Jury Award for Jayasurya and Special Mention for George. Lukka Chuppi was an official selection at the Indian Panorama section of the 47th International Film Festival of India.

== Synopsis ==
A group of friends from college, Raghuram, Siddharth, Rafiq, Annie, Radhika, and Benny, reunite after a long interval of 14 years upon the insistence of Xavier. The wives see a new side to their husbands, who are suddenly singing and laughing as they did during their college days. The events that follow their reunion form the crux of the story.

== Cast ==
- Jayasurya as Reghuram
- Murali Gopy as Siddharth
- Joju George as Rafiq
- Ramya Nambeeshan as Revathi Siddharth
- Chinnu Kuruvilla as Annie Reghu
- Muthumani as Suhara Rafiq
- Dinesh Prabhakar as Benny Chacko
- Asmita Sood as Radhika John
- Unnikrishnan as Alavikka
- Abhija Sivakala as Renuka
- Master Suhail as Manu Siddarth
- Indrans as Narayanan (cameo appearance)
- Saiju Kurup as Fr. Xavier (cameo appearance)

== Production ==
=== Pre-production ===
The film is Bash Mohammed's directorial debut, and the story was developed by himself. He initially approached with the film idea to Dinesh Prabhakar, who showed interest and became the film's executive producer.

The title Lukka Chuppi means "hide and seek", which Bash uses as a metaphor for life. According to him, Lukka Chuppi is an experimental film "that explores the behavioural pattern of a group of old friends who are on a get-together after a long gap". The story happens in one night, and centers on the re-union of six college friends with their spouses, who are now in their mid-30s. "It's not a film built on a hero-heroine format. It unravels all six lives in a very light and pleasant style while maintaining an air of feel-goodness till the last frame. Moreover, dialogue delivery is the most important aspect of the narrative, the very reason we decided to bring Resul Pookutty on board", says Bash.

Resul Pookutty was the film's sound designer. Bijibal composed the music from the lyrics of Rafeeq Ahammed. Lukka Chuppi was produced by Feel Reel Cinemas. Actor Dinesh Prabhakar, who played Benny Chacko, was also the casting director of the film.

As of April 2015, the release was planned for 21 May 2015.

=== Casting ===
Jayasurya plays Reghuram, and according to him the character is "a creative person who is filthy rich. He is someone who has gone through many ups and downs in his life. It's an intense character". Asmita Sood was reported to be in the cast in early January 2015, in an important role which brings significant development in the second half of the film. She plays Radhika; Lukka Chuppi was her second Malayalam film after the segment Aami in 5 Sundarikal (2013). The actress joined the film in mid-January 2015. Ramya Nambeesan was cast as Revathy, an ordinary homemaker, wife of Siddharth, played by Murali. Muthumani plays Suhara who hails from a rich family in Malappuram. Suhara aspired to become a doctor but was married too early to a doctor. She speaks in Malappuram dialect throughout the film. Joju George plays Rafeeq, who is from a modest background and married to Suhara, his dominating wife. Dinesh Prabhakar plays Benny Chacko, the once college rank holder who end up as an auto rickshaw driver. Chinnu Kuruvila was cast in the role of Annie, a fashion designer, spouse to Jayasurya's Raghuram. Saiju Kurup portrayed Xavier, one of the college mates who is now a priest.

=== Filming ===
The filming began in January 2015 in Guruvayoor, Thrissur. The entire film was shot in a single location, a waterside resort. The two-hour story which takes place within an evening-to-night time span was completely filmed inside the resort. For the film, a house set was created on the banks of Chettuva Backwater in Thrissur. The frontage was entirely built of glass. Including the wallpaper and accessories, all designing materials were imported from Dubai, which cost nearly ₹50 lakh. The entire film revolves around a re-union party and takes place inside the house. In the film, the house is owned by Siddharth, the character played by Murali Gopy; "he was a singer earlier and has classy tastes in everything. So the house as well as its interiors have been done up accordingly", says Bash Mohammed, who was also the architect of the resort. The filming progressed through February 2015 in the artificially made resort in Chettuvayal, Guruvayoor. The film was shot continuously for 16 – 17 days. The voices of the actors were recorded using sync sound, which had only been used in a handful of Malayalam films before this. The team completed filming in late February 2015.

== Music ==
The film score and soundtrack were composed by Bijibal, with the lyrics written by Rafeeq Ahmed.

1. Ee Mizhikalil (Vivekanand)

== Release ==
Lukka Chuppi was released on 5 June 2015.

== Reception ==
=== Critical response ===
Lukka Chuppi opened to mostly positive reviews from critics, and earned praise for the performances, script and dialogues. The reviewer for Sify commented: "At less than two hours, Lukka Chuppi can be a good entertainer, if you are not there for some heavy-duty drama. It has its moments for sure and can even remind you of your crushes and escapades from the past". The reviewer praised Bijibal's music, Pookutty's sound mixing and the performances, especially by Jayasurya, but criticized the film's title and "the never-ending drinking sessions and hasty climax". Deepa Soman of The Times of India rated the film 2.5 out of 5 stars, and praised the dialogues and the one-liners, but criticized the film's ending half, saying that some portions "get dramatic". Deepa Gauri of the Khaleej Times said in an out of review article that the film is an "intelligently written and tautly made quirky tale".

=== Accolades ===
Festival screenings

- International Film Festival of India
- New York Indian Film Festival
- Indian Panorama Film Festival

National Film Awards

- Special Mention - Jayasurya

Kerala State Film Award

- Special Jury Award - Jayasurya
- Special Mention - Joju George
