= Navya Natarajan =

Indian actress

- Other name: Nayana Harshita
- Occupations: Actress, Entrepreneur, Social Worker, Businesswoman
- Spouse: Vallivedu Vikram Reddy

Navya Natarajan is an Indian actress. She has mainly acted in Malayalam, Kannada, and Telugu films.

== Early life ==
Navya grew up in the suburban South Bangalore area of Katthiraguppe. She attended Auden High School, Hosakerehalli, Bangalore, from 1994 to 1997. She pursued a science course in pre-university college at Jain College in 1997 in Vishweswarapuram, Bangalore. But after a year, she dropped out and pursued a commerce course. She later went on to obtain a Bachelor of Business Management (B.B.M.) degree from Bangalore University.

== Career ==
Navya started her acting career in 2002 with her debut in the Kannada movie "Kitty". Later, she went on to act in many other movies spanning Kannada, Tamil, Malayalam, and Telugu. Along with acting, she also worked as the Director of Sales and Marketing for Concept Group. In 2009, she started her own business in fitness and gyms called Snap Fitness.

== Personal life ==
Navya has two younger sisters, Kavya Natarajan and Gouthami Natarajan. She married Vallivedu Vikram Reddy in 2022. Mr. Vallivedu Vikram Reddy is the director of Vallivedu Raja Canning Pvt. Ltd.

== Filmography ==
Year	Film	Role	Language	Notes
2002	Kitty	Priya	Kannada	
2003	Sachi		Kannada	
2003	Namma Preethiya Ramu	Lakshmi	Kannada	
2006	Kala		Telugu	
2007	Brahmastram	Nimmi	Telugu	
2010	April Fool	Seema	Malayalam	
2011	Pranayam	Aswathy	Malayalam	
2011	Tantra		Kannada	
