= Jayasurya =

Indian actor, distributor, film producer, playback singer, impressionist (born 1979)

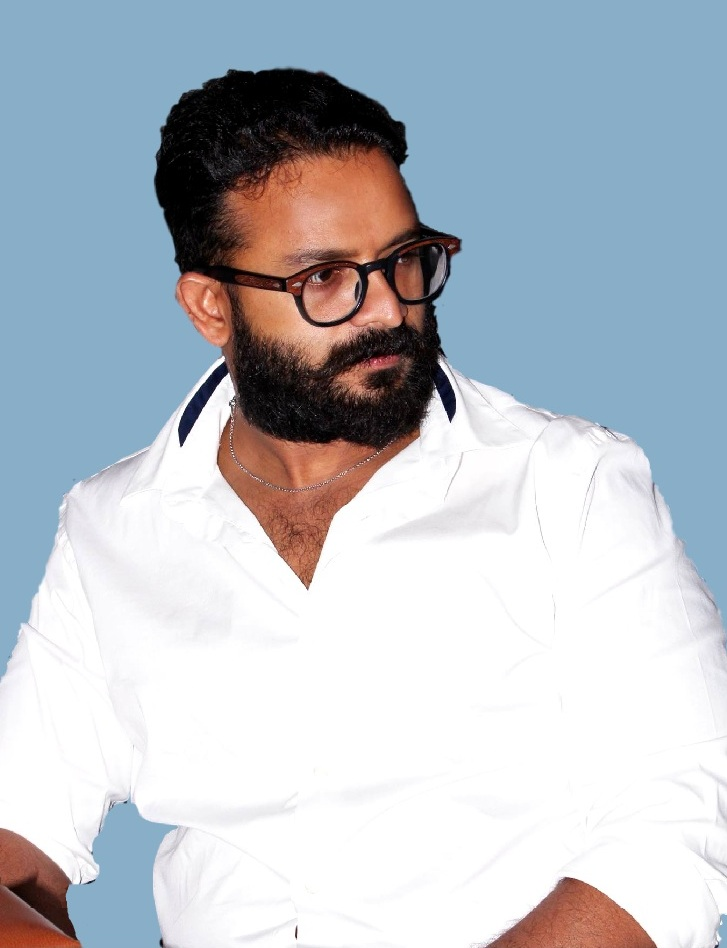
- Born: 31 August 1978 (age 48); Tripunithura, Kochi, Kerala
- Occupations: Actor; producer; playback singer; distributor
- Years active: 1995–present
- Works: Full list
- Spouse: Saritha Jayasurya (m. 2004)
- Children: 2
- Awards: National Film Awards; Kerala State Film Awards; Filmfare Awards South; Cincinnati Film Festival

Jayasurya (born 31 August 1978) is an Indian actor, film producer, playback singer, and impressionist who works in Malayalam films. He has appeared in more than 100 films and has won several awards, including a National Film Award, three Kerala State Film Awards, two Filmfare Awards South for acting and Best Actor at the Cincinnati Film Festival held in Cincinnati, US. Jayasurya has also appeared in a few Tamil films.

Jayasurya began his career as a mimicry artist and hosted a few television shows on Malayalam channels. He made his acting debut in the 1995 film Three Men Army as a junior artist. He made his debut as a lead actor in Oomappenninu Uriyadappayyan (2002). In the 2000s, Jayasurya was popular for his comic-oriented roles in Swapnakkoodu (2003), Pulival Kalyanam (2003), Chathikkatha Chanthu (2004), Kerala Cafe (2009), Chocolate (2007) and Gulumaal (2009), as well as his villainous roles in Classmates (2006), Arabikkatha (2007), and Kangaroo (2007).

By the 2010s, Jayasurya had gained critical acclaim for his roles, in films such as Cocktail (2010), Janapriyan (2011), Beautiful (2011), Trivandrum Lodge (2012), Apothecary (2014), Iyobinte Pusthakam (2014), Lukka Chuppi (2015), Su.. Su... Sudhi Vathmeekam (2015), and Captain (2018). He was also popular for comedy films such as Punyalan Agarbattis (2013), Amar Akbar Anthony (2015), Aadu (2015) and Aadu 2 (2017). Jayasurya made his debut as a producer by co-producing the film Punyalan Agarbattis and he is also credited as a playback singer in a few films.

Jayasurya won the Best Supporting Actor Award for his performance in Apothecary at the 62nd Filmfare Awards South. In 2016, Jayasurya won the Special Jury Award at the 46th Kerala State Film Awards and the Special Mention at the 63rd National Film Awards for his performances in the films Su Su Sudhi Vathmeekam and Lukka Chuppi. He won two Kerala State Film Awards for Best Actor for Captain and Njan Marykutty in 2018 and for Vellam in 2021.

== Early life ==
Jayasurya was born to Mani and Thankam at Tripunithura, Kochi. He studied at St. George U. P. School, Chambakkara, and at Government Sanskrit High School, Tripunithura. He then did his degree in Commerce at All Saints College, Ernakulam.

After his studies he joined mimicry troupes such as Crown of Cochin and Kottayam Nazeer's Cochin Discovery.

== Personal life ==
Jayasurya married his longtime girlfriend, Saritha on 25 January 2004. The couple have two children. In 2022 he was living with his family in Kochi, dividing their time between a house in Kadavanthra and an apartment overlooking Kochi Lake near Marine Drive on the city’s seafront.

== Film career ==
Jaysasurya started his on-screen career as a mimicry artist. He made his acting debut in the 1995 film Three Men Army as a junior artist. He made his debut as a lead actor in Oomappenninu Uriyadappayyan (2002). In the 2000s, Jayasurya was popular for his comic-oriented roles in Swapnakkoodu (2003), Pulival Kalyanam (2003), Chathikkatha Chanthu (2004), Kerala Cafe (2009), Chocolate (2007) and Gulumaal (2009), as well as his villainous roles in Classmates (2006), Arabikkatha (2007), and Kangaroo (2007). In 2005, he appeared in Bus Conductor, as a side character, starring Mammooty in lead . The following year he appeared in Kilukkam Kilukilukkam, a sequel to Kilukkam. In Classmates of the same year, he played the role of Satheesan Kanjikkuzhi, an aspiring student leader, which was considered one of his breakthrough performances. He was then cast in a negative role in Lal Jose's Arabikkatha. This followed villain roles in Hareendran Oru Nishkalankan and Kangaroo.

Jaysasurya played a variety of roles in 2007–2008: the romantic lover with a comic touch in Chocolate, the serious police officer in Positive, the humorous drama scriptwriter in Shakespeare M.A. Malayalam, the small-time thief and antagonist in LollyPop, the supporting role in Love in Singapore, and the young politician in Balachandra Menon's De Ingottu Nokkiye.

In 2010 he acted in Nallavan directed by debut director Aji John, in which he played three stages of a person born and brought up on the Tamil Nadu-Kerala border. The film Cocktail in 2010 was what established a new phase to his career as his performance was critically acclaimed.

In 2011, he appeared in 20 get-ups in T. V. Chandran's fantasy film Sankaranum Mohananum. The same year, he played the lead role in Beautiful which went on to become a critical and commercial success. He played the role of a paraplegic named Stephen and was well received by audiences and critics alike, all saying it was his best performance to date; and he was one of the main contenders for best actor nominations in several film awards. The film is noted for its earliest development of new generation movies that originated in the 2010s and eventually became known as New Wave Malayalam Cinema. Janapriyan and Beautiful were his most commercially successful films of the year. In a year-end report on Malayalam cinema, Deepika newspaper applauded Jayasurya for choosing the right roles and chose him as the Star of the Year 2011.

In 2012 he appeared in Trivandrum Lodge and Husbands in Goa which were released on the same day, and were both box office successes. His role as a shady introverted pervert in Trivandrum Lodge was well received by critics and garnered more recognition for him as an established actor. In 2013 he appeared in a crucial role in one of Roshan Andrrews' best films, Mumbai Police, and played the lead role of a don in Hotel California directed by Aji John, in which his role as Airport Jimmy was well favoured by the audience and was recognized as a style statement for the youth of the time. The same year his performance in Shyamaprasad's English: An Autumn in London as a Kathakali artiste-turned-waiter who is an illegal immigrant in the United Kingdom won immense critical praise.

Jayasurya turned producer in 2013 with Punyalan Agarbattis, which turned out to be a successful film.

In 2014, his first release was the movie Happy Journey, which was directed by Boban Samuel; though the film was an average grosser, his performance in the role of a blind cricket player garnered praise from both critics and audiences alike. In August of the same year, Apothecary with the director Madhav Ramadasan was released, in which he played the major role (apart from Suresh Gopi's role as Dr. Vijay Nambiar), as Subin Joseph, a poverty-driven man who suffers from a neurological disorder. The actor lost more than 10 kg of weight for the role, and his portrayal of the character was immensely praised by critics and the audience, adding to Jayasurya's credibility and his list of notable roles. In the same year, Seconds with director Aneesh Upasana, as the villain in Iyobinte Pusthakam with director Amal Neerad, Lal Bahadur Shastri with debutant director Rejishh Midhila, Akku Akbar's Mathai Kuzhappakkaranalla and Priyadarsan's Aamayum Muyalum were released.

In 2015, he played the character Shaji Pappan in Aadu. Despite being a box office failure, the movie and his character developed a cult following after the movie's DVD version was released. The same year, he acted alongside Prithviraj and Indrajith in Nadirshah's comedy movie Amar Akbar Anthony which was successful at the box office. His performance in Su Su Sudhi Vathmeekam as a stutterer was also appreciated.

Jaysurya's successful movies in 2016 were the comedy horror Pretham and the action comedy Inspector Dawood Ibrahim. However, the latter film received mostly negative reviews from critics. His other movies of the year were Shajahanum Pareekuttiyum and School Bus.

In 2019, he won the Kerala State Film Award for Best Actor for his performances in Captain and Njan Marykutty.

He also acted for the graphic novel-style ‘newspaper movie’ Locked Inn, published in Malayala Manorama newspaper in 2020.

He won his third Kerala State Film Award in 2021 as well as the second in the Best Actor category for his performance in Vellam. Jayasurya won the best actor award at the 20th Dhaka International Film festival for Sunny

In 2022, he starred in the investigative thriller John Luther which was directed by debutant Abhijith Joseph. Later the same year he appeared in Eesho which was directed by Nadirshah. In 2026, he starred in the fantasy action comedy film Aadu 3: One Last Ride – Part 1, reprising his role as Shaji Pappan in the third film of the Aadu series.

His upcoming projects are Kathanar - The Wild Sorcerer, directed by Rojin Thomas and Operation Tral directed by Ratheesh Vega.

== Awards and nominations ==
Jayasurya awards and nominations
Awards and nominations
| Award | Wins | Nominations |
| National Film Awards | 1 | 0 |

Totals (Note: Certain award groups do not simply award one winner. They acknowledge several different recipients, have runners-up, and have third place. Since this is a specific recognition and is different from losing an award, runner-up mentions are considered wins in this award tally. For simplification and to avoid errors, each award in this list has been presumed to have had a prior nomination.)
- Wins: 26
- Nominations: 32

List of awards and nominations
| Award | Year | Category | Film(s) | Result | Ref. |
|---|---|---|---|---|---|
| National Film Awards | 2015 | Special Mention | Su.. Su... Sudhi Vathmeekam; Lukka Chuppi | Won | |
| Kerala State Film Awards | 2015 | Special Jury Award | Su.. Su... Sudhi Vathmeekam; Lukka Chuppi | Won | |
| Kerala State Film Awards | 2018 | Best Actor | Njan Marykutty; Captain | Won | |
| Kerala State Film Awards | 2020 | Best Actor | Vellam | Won | |
| Filmfare Awards South | 2014 | Best Supporting Actor (Malayalam) | Apothecary | Won | |
| Filmfare Awards South | 2015 | Best Actor (Malayalam) | Su.. Su... Sudhi Vathmeekam | Nominated | |
| Filmfare Awards South | 2015 | Critics Best Actor – Malayalam | Su.. Su... Sudhi Vathmeekam | Won | |
| SIIMA Awards | 2013 | Best Supporting Actor (Malayalam) | Mumbai Police | Nominated | |
| SIIMA Awards | 2014 | Best Supporting Actor (Malayalam) | Apothecary | Won | |
| SIIMA Awards | 2014 | Best Actor in a Negative Role (Malayalam) | Iyobinte Pusthakam | Won | |
| SIIMA Awards | 2016 | Best Actor (Malayalam) | Su.. Su... Sudhi Vathmeekam | Nominated | |
| SIIMA Awards | 2019 | Best Actor (Malayalam) | Captain | Nominated | |
| Asianet Film Awards | 2008 | Best Star Pair (shared with Roma) | Shakespeare M.A. Malayalam; Minnaminnikoottam | Won | |
| Asianet Film Awards | 2009 | Best Star Pair (shared with Roma) | Utharaswayamvaram | Won | |
| Asianet Film Awards | 2010 | Youth Icon of the Year Award | Happy Husbands; Nallavan; Cocktail; Four Friends | Won | |
| Asianet Film Awards | 2015 | Best Actor in a Villain Role | Iyobinte Pusthakam | Won | |
| Asianet Film Awards | 2016 | Best Actor | Su.. Su... Sudhi Vathmeekam | Nominated | |
| Asianet Film Awards | 2017 | Popular Actor | Punyalan Private Limited; Aadu 2 | Won | |
| IIFA Utsavam | 2015 | Best Performance in a Negative Role | Iyobinte Pusthakam | Won | |
| Manorama Film Awards | 2021 | Best Entertainer - Actor | Vellam | Won | |
| Vanitha Film Awards | 2015 | Best Actor in a Negative Role | Iyobinte Pusthakam | Won | |
| Vanitha Film Awards | 2016 | Special Performance (Actor) | Su.. Su... Sudhi Vathmeekam | Won | |
| Vanitha Film Awards | 2018 | Special Performance (Actor) | Aadu 2 | Won | |
| Asianet Comedy Awards | 2016 | Popular Actor | Pretham | Won | |
| Asianet Comedy Awards | 2016 | Popular Film | Pretham | Won | |
| Asianet Comedy Awards | 2016 | Best Actor | Pretham | Nominated | |
| Asiavision Awards | 2011 | Best Supporting Actor | Cocktail | Won | |
| Asiavision Awards | 2012 | Second Best Actor | Trivandrum Lodge; Beautiful | Won | |
| Asiavision Awards | 2014 | Special Jury Award | Apothecary | Won | |
| J. C. Daniel Film Award | 2021 | Best Actor | Sunny | Won | |
| Amrita FEFKA Film Awards | 2012 | Entertainer of the Year | Beautiful | Won | |
| Mathrubhoomi Amrita film awards | 2009 | Best pair | Ivar Vivahitharayal | Won | |
| Ramu Kariat Film Awards | 2012 | Special Jury Award | Beautiful | Won | |
