= Brahmakulam =

- city
- Location in Kerala, India
- Coordinates: 10.577180°N 76.052840°E
- Country: India
- State: Kerala
- District: Thrissur

Population (2001)
  - Total: 13,026

Languages
  - Official: Malayalam, English
- Time zone: UTC+5:30 (IST)

Brahmakulam is a census town in the Thrissur district in the state of Kerala, India.

== Demographics ==
The name Brahmakulam has been formed from two words, first word "Brahma" means pertaining to God Brahma or one who believes in God Brahma and kulam means the group living or a community of like minded. Brahmakulam means a community of God Brahma. Some people say that this place had been occupied by Brahmans. In both ways it means the same. There are many Hindu temples and prayer idles located in this small place. As well as the families of Brahmans continue to live here. Communities associated with the temples argue the validity of the name because of the various significance they play in the town.

As of the 2001 India census, Brahmakulam had a population of 13,026. Males constitute 47% of the population and females constitute 53%. Brahmakulam has an average literacy rate of 85%, which is higher than the national average of 59.5%; the male literacy rate is 86% and the female literacy rate is 83%. 11% of the population is under 6 years of age.

== Attractions ==
Brahmakulam is on the route between important pilgrim centres, and has several religious structures of note, such as the Guruvayur temple and Pavaratty church.
