= Eesho =

- Official film Poster
- Directed by: Nadirshah
- Written by: Suneesh Varanad
- Produced by: Arun Narayan
- Starring: Jayasurya; Jaffar Idukki; Namitha Pramod; Suresh Krishna; Johny Antony; Akshara Kishor
- Cinematography: Roby Varghese Raj
- Edited by: Shameer Muhammed
- Music by: Songs: Nadirshah; Background Score: Rahul Raj
- Production company: Arun Narayan Productions
- Distributed by: SonyLIV
- Release date: 5 October 2022
- Running time: 107 minutes
- Country: India
- Language: Malayalam

Eesho is an Indian Malayalam-language drama thriller film directed by Nadirshah featuring Jayasurya and Namitha Pramod in the lead roles. The film written by Suneesh Varanad is produced by Arun Narayan. Roby Varghese is the cinematographer while Nadirshah composes the songs and the original background score is composed and produced by Rahul Raj. The film was released on 5 October 2022 through SonyLIV OTT platform.

== Plot ==
Shivani and her mother lives alone in their home while her father is working in the Middle East. Shivani gets molested at her school by her teacher Viswambaran and she opens up about the same during counselling. During the following enquiry, Raveendran, another school staff and the principal turn the story around, accusing Shivani's mother and her husband not being in good terms since it's been 7 years since he came back from overseas. She tries to explain to them that theirs was a love marriage and he ended up having to work abroad continuously to meet the financial commitments he incurred while buying the house and for supporting his family, since all their relatives had ostracized them. Media and public narrative waves a story of Shivani's mother having an affair with her teacher and she subsequently commit suicide with her daughter out of shame.

Cut to the present, Ramachandran Pillai is a prime witness in a notorious molestation case and is set to appear before the court soon against the accused, his former employer Sevichan. Sevichan along with his advocate Sebastian and accomplice Sethu try to influence him without success. They decide to kill Ramachandran Pillai before the trails and gets his colleague Jamal, another ATM security guard to request Pillai to cover for his night shift, quoting some heath issue. Pillai agrees for the night shift, but is warned by his advocates Joseph and Ashwathy of the impending danger and asks him to be very careful. In the night, one minivan gets stalled in front of the ATM and the driver Eesho strikes a company with Pillai. The mysterious stranger gets close with Pillai and makes him open up about the incidents he witnessed about Sevichan raping two minor girls and framing it as a suicide. As the night progresses, Eesho looks more and more hostile and Pillai suspects him to be the hitman that Sevichan had arranged to finish him off. After several incidents around the ATM involving the police and some ATM customers, it starts raining heavily. During that time, Ambi Sura, Sevichan's goon and his truck driver accomplices crash the truck in to the ATM. The next morning, Sevichan's accomplice in the police checks the crime scene, but finds Sura's body in the ATM instead of Pillai.

It is then shown that Pillai was subdued by Eesho and kept in his van and he brings him to his hideout. There Eesho revels that he's the unlucky father of Shivani, Shivan, who went to work abroad and had to come back home hearing the news of his wife and daughters death. After some days, his wife's distant relative Varghese approaches Shivan. He tells Shivan that his daughter and Shivani were school mates and divulges him of all the actual incidents at the school prior to their suicide. Shivan gets heartbroken realizing that his family did not tell about all these developments to him because of his current situation at workplace. He murders Raveendran and Viswambaran and is sentenced to a jail term. During his term, he keeps track of all such molestation cases happening across the state and during his parole period, starts killing the main witnesses who took money and gave false statements to save the culprit. One day he meets Ambi Sura who comes as his cellmate and gets to know about his quotation to kill Pillai. He also gets out on parole and keeps an eye on Pillai, saving him from the truckers attempt to run over him on his way to work. He was the one who killed Sura on the night and planted his body on the ATM. In a turn of events, police believe the ATM murder to be connected to a women trafficking case that Sura was linked with and closes the case. Shivan gets Pillai safely to the court the following day to appear as the witness and gives his statement. Sevichan gets arrested and Shivan goes back to the home.

== Cast ==
- Jayasurya as Shiva / Eesho
- Jaffar Idukki as Ramachandran Pillai
- Namitha Pramod as Advocate Aswathy
- Suresh Krishna as Sevichan
- Johny Antony as Advocate Sebastian Aduppukkunnel
- Akshara Kishor as Shivani, Shivan's daughter
- Lakshmi R Pishaordy as Shivani’s mother, Shivan's wife
- Yadhu Krishnan as Viswambaran
- Manikandan R. Achari as Ambi Sura
- Srikant Murali as Joseph
- Indrans as Varghese
- Kottayam Nazeer as Salim
- Rajith Kumar as Raveendran
- Mohan Jose as Jamal
- Jayakumar Parameswaran Pillai as driver
- V. K. Baiju as S. I. Michale
- Sindhu Varma as councellor
- Arun Narayan as Sethu
- Samadh Sulaiman as Alex
- Eloor George as Alex's relative
- Nandu Poduval as Shivan's coworker
- Adinad Sasi as Krishnankutty
- Priyanka Anoop as Teashop owner
- Nadirshah as a passenger in the bus (cameo appearance)
- Rajini Chandy as the court judge (cameo appearance)

== Marketing ==
The first look motion poster of the film was released by Mammootty through his official Facebook account on 15 May 2021. Later on 5 August 2021 second look poster of the movie was released. The teaser of the movie was released on 3 April 2022.

== Release ==
The film will have a direct direct-to-video release through the SonyLIV OTT platform on 5 October 2022. The satellite rights of the film is acquired by Amrita TV and will premiere on the occasion of Onam.

== Controversies ==
The film was briefly embroiled in controversy over its title which is the Malayalam name of Jesus. The Kerala High Court eventually dismissed the plea to stay the release of the film.
