= John Luther (film) =

2022 film directed by Abhijith Joseph

- Theatrical release poster
- Directed by: Abhijith Joseph
- Written by: Abhijith Joseph
- Produced by: Thomas P Mathew; Christeena Thomas (co-producer)
- Starring: Jayasurya; Elango Kumaravel
- Cinematography: Roby Varghese Raj
- Edited by: Praveen Prabhakar
- Music by: Shaan Rahman
- Production company: Alonsa Films
- Distributed by: Century films
- Release date: 27 May 2022
- Country: India
- Language: Malayalam

John Luther is a 2022 Indian Malayalam-language crime thriller film directed by Abhijith Joseph (in his directorial debut). It stars Jayasurya in the lead role. principal photography of the film began in November 2021.

John Luther was released on 27 May 2022 to positive reviews from critics.

== Plot ==
Circle Inspector John Luther is an honest and efficient police officer posted at the Munnar police station. His sister Leena is having an engagement ceremony but as usual he is late as he is a committed workaholic police officer who always gives primary importance to his duty. He arrives home late in the night and is reprimanded by his father for not reaching on time as he is not that happy with John's workaholic and hectic schedule. The next day he leaves soon after the function is over. John is in charge of the investigation of a motorbike accident that happened the night before where the driver Prakashan died on the spot but the pillion rider is missing. Using CCTV visuals and photographs taken by the passengers of the bus on which the body fell, they identify the pickup truck which hit the bike. But the pickup driver said he left the pillion rider on the road and does not know what happened to him.

During this time, a school boy also goes missing from around the same area. John is unable to find any links between the two cases but feels they are somehow related. John notices a pickup truck that was on the spot of the first crime scene which did not have number plate on its side. Now police is on the lookout for this truck.

John confronts two goons from another high profile case he is investigating and ends up in a fight. During the fight, one of the goons hits John on his left side of his ears using a tube light and John gets seriously injured. At the hospital, doctor informs John and his family that he lost hearing of his left ear completely and has only 20% hearing ability on the right ear. John takes a month's leave and starts using a hearing aid and a voice recorder.

When John comes back, another women named Geetha also goes missing. During that investigation, he finds a house where the pickup truck was spotted by the neighbors. Upon questioning the owner Joby, he finds the pick up truck and find who drives the truck usually. The driver is Venkit, a Tamil daily laborer who just started 4 months back with them. He is now in Chennai trying to sell the house owners truck because his business is doing bad. John questions who brought Venkit to them and it leads to Venkit's uncle Prasad who retired and went back home for health reasons. John goes to Prasad's hometown in Kolukkumalai and interrogates Prasad.

Prasad says that he already knew that Venkit was a psycho. He was a bright medical student who passed MBBS with a rank, but was debarred for practicing medicine during his house surgency thereby accidentally killing a girl who was his patient. This made him practice surgery on dead bodies to satisfy the surgeon within. Prasad saw the all the murders. Prasad falls ill and he is admitted to a nearby hospital. John gets the body parts of the 3 victims.

John gets a list of medical students who were debarred and finds out that Venkit's name was not in the list. But he finds Prasad's name in that list and realises that Prasad is the real serial killer. He goes back to the hospital to capture him. By that time, Prasad manages to make John's colleague ASI Rajan unconscious and starts performing surgery on him. John and Prasad ends up in a fight in which Prasad severely injures John, but John manages to kill Prasad. John later recovers from his injuries completely at the hospital.

In the final scene of the movie, John submitting the closing report of the crimes while his superior officer tells the DGP on the phone that John is going to be assigned to another case.

== Cast ==
- Jayasurya as CI John Luther, Devikulam Police Station
- Elango Kumaravel as Dr. Prasad Kumar, a serial killer
- Deepak Parambol as SI Felix, Devikulam Police Station
- Siddique as Mathews, John's father
- Athmiya Rajan as Jessy, John's wife
- Drishya Raghunath as Leena Mathews, John's sister
- Sreelakshmi as Molly Mathews, John's mother
- Sivadas Kannur as Devikulam Police Station ASI Rajan
- Srikanth Murali as Idukki SP Krishnakumar IPS, John's superior officer
- Senthil Krishna as Venkit
- Benzi Mathews as Dr. Kiran, ENT Specialist
- Pramod Velliyanad as Varghese, Truck Driver
- Bitto David as Joby
- Vinod as Libin
- Aanie Abraham as Geetha
- Neethu Chandran as Revathi
- Nimisha as Ancy

== Production ==
Debutant director Abhijith Joseph approached actor Jayasurya with an investigation thriller and the project got green signal from the award-winning actor. The film was bankrolled by Thomas P Mathew for Alonsa Films with Christeena Thomas as co-producer. Actors Deepak Parambol and Siddique were the first to join the cast and the film completed its first schedule in Vagamon followed by the final schedule at Ernakulam. Director Abhijith Joseph said that the character ‘John Luther’ is not inspired from the iconic ‘DCI John Luther’ played by actor Idris Elba from the British television series Luther. Century Films has acquired the distribution rights of the film. While actor Deepak Parambol completed his dubbing on 30 December 2021, actor Jayasurya started his dubbing on 22 January 2022.

== Reception ==
S.R.Praveen of The Hindu mentioned that "the film is an evenly paced thriller that falters only in the last act, in an attempt to deliver a shocking twist". Anjana George of The Times of India rated the film with 3/5 stars, stating that the film would make every Jayasurya fans happy. The News Minute rated the film with 2.5/5 stars, mentioning that "for nearly two hours, the film flows by almost smoothly, ticking several boxes of a gripping thriller, but in the last 20 minutes, digs its own hole, and falls right into it". Sajin Shrijith of Cinema Express rated the film with 3/5 stars, stated that "the film succeeds in its aim of keeping one engaged for two hours, but when you compare it to films like Drishyam 2 and Antakshari, it comes up short". Princy Alexander of Manoramaonline.com stated that "the movie began promisingly, but wastes a lot of time trying to find closure, thus resulting in a lag product, despite a decent number of twists and turns.
