= Swapnakoodu =

2003 film directed by Kamal

Swapnakkoodu
- DVD Cover
- Directed by: Kamal
- Screenplay by: Iqbal Kuttippuram; Kamal
- Produced by: P. Rajan
- Starring: Prithviraj Sukumaran; Kunchacko Boban; Jayasurya; Meera Jasmine; Bhavana
- Cinematography: P. Sukumar
- Edited by: K. Rajagopal
- Music by: Mohan Sithara
- Production company: Vaisakha Movies
- Distributed by: Lal Release
- Release date: 5 September 2003
- Running time: 160 minutes
- Country: India
- Language: Malayalam

Swapnakoodu (transl. Nest of Dreams) is a 2003 Indian Malayalam-language romantic comedy film co-written and directed by Kamal. It stars Prithviraj Sukumaran, Kunchacko Boban, Jayasurya, Meera Jasmine and Bhavana. The film's score and soundtrack were composed by Mohan Sithara. The film was the third highest grosser of the year.

== Plot ==
The movie follows three young men: Alex Chandy, alias Kunjunju, who makes a pass at every girl he meets; Deepu, who is unable to express his feelings to Kamala; and Ashtamoorthy, who does not take anything seriously. While studying a Hotel Management course in Pondicherry, they become lodgers in the top floor of a house owned by Sophy, who lives there with her daughters: Kamala and Padma.

After moving in, all three have a crush on Kamala. When Kunjunju attempts to seduce Kamala, she threatens him with a knife, but he ignores that. Deepu is too shy to express his feelings for Kamala, while Ashtamoorthy fakes kidney stones to skip class and get time alone with her. Kunjunju and Deepu make Ashtamoorthy the Rakhi brother of Kamala to prevent him from pursuing her romantically, as they both continue to pursue her.

One day, Chandramathi, the owner of the area, comes to the house and orders Sophy to leave immediately, as they cannot pay their rent. Shocked, Sophy has a heart attack and dies shortly later in the hospital. That evening, Chandramathi gives them one week to stay there, and Abbas rebukes Chandramathi for her heartless behaviour towards Sophy's daughters. The boys, Padma, and Kamala take a trip to refresh themselves.

Philippose arrives from Chennai to visit his nieces and pick up some belongings he had there, but is ejected by the boys for disturbing Padma and Kamala. Kunjunju tries again to express his feelings for Kamala, but she accidentally fractures his leg. Kamala asks Deepu and Moorthy to watch him, as she feels unsafe on her own with him.

One day, after Deepu and Moorthy go to work, Kunjunju visits Kamala to express his love for her. He tells Deepu that he has not gotten out of bed, but Kamala informs Deepu that Kunjunju was disturbing her, and Deepu and Moorthy subsequently discover Kunjunju at her house, behaving badly. Enraged, Deepu forgets Kunjunju's condition and beats him. Kamala orders all three to leave, to avoid a disturbance. Deepu goes to Abbas's house, while Moorthy and Kunjunju go to a hotel. Moorthy decides to bring Kunjunju back to make peace with Kamala and Deepu. That night, Deepu tells Kunjunju about his feelings for Kamala. Kunjunju decides to sacrifice his love for Kamala and advises Deepu to tell Kamala how he feels. Deepu sees Kamala while out jogging; she gives him a flower and says there is no problem between them. Deepu realises it was actually Padma who came instead, as Kamala had a headache. Afterward, he gives the flower to a small girl. When Padma arrives home, she insults Kunjunju, testing Kamala's reaction, and establishes that Kamala is actually in love with Kunjunju.

When Kunjunju asks Deepu what happened, he admits that Padma came instead. That evening, while the boys are at a restaurant, Padma calls Kunjunju to say that Kamala wants to see him. When they meet, Kamala says she loves Kunjunju. He is initially happy, but then realises he cannot betray Deepu, and tells Kamala he was only pretending to love her. Kamala leaves in tears. Kunjunju tells Moorthy that he did this for Deepu. However, he is still in pain and decides to forget Kamala forever.

Just before they leave Pondicherry, the boys go on a final trip with Kamala and Padma. Padma wants everyone to part ways happily instead of in sorrow, so they start singing and dancing. However, when Moorthy and Padma finally dance, Padma falls from a rock and dies, leaving Kamala upset, as she is now alone.

The next day, as the boys prepare to leave, Kunjunju makes one last attempt to unite Deepu and Kamala. However, Kamala is not able to leave her home. She gives her last flowers to Deepu, and they leave. However, Kunjunju orders Deepu to stop the car, realising Kamala is the girl he loves. Deepu, who by now knows that Kamala actually loves Kunjunju, turns around, and they go back to her, only to discover that Philippose has taken her home to Chennai. They rush to Chennai in pursuit, and when they find Philippose, they thrash him, believing he has sold Kamala to someone. However it is revealed that Philippose genuinely cared for Kamala and Padma like his children, and brought a desolate Kamala to his home, hoping to raise her along with his own daughters. Philippose takes them to Kamala, who initially fights Kunjunju, but later accepts his love. With Phillippose's blessing, all of them return to Kerala. On arrival, Deepu visits the house where he usually gives the flowers. The girl takes the flowers and asks him to wait. A beautiful lady (Laila) emerges smiling onto the balcony, indicating that she will become Deepu's lover.

== Cast ==
- Prithviraj Sukumaran as Alex Chandy (Kunjoonju)
- Kunchacko Boban as Deepak Narayanan (Deepu)
- Jayasurya as Ashtamoorthy (Moorthy)
- Meera Jasmine as Kamala
- Bhavana as Padma
- Vijeesh Vijayan as Abbas
- Cochin Haneefa as Philippose
- Kalaranjini as Sophia
- Poornima Anand as Chandramati
- Lishoy as Suku
- Dinesh Prabhakar as Anbazhagan
- Ameen Sajeev as 10-year-old Kukku
- Manya as Kurjeet
- Laila in a cameo appearance
- Sandra Amy as Madhurakani

== Music ==
The soundtrack features six songs composed by Mohan Sithara, with lyrics by Kaithapram. Upon its release, all of the songs became chartbusters.

- "Karuppinazhaku" - Jyotsna, Rajesh Vijay, Pradeep Babu
- "Oru Poo" - Srinivas, Sujatha Mohan
- "Malarkili" - Madhu Balakrishnan
- "Ishtamallada" - Afsal, Chitra Iyer
- "Marakam Ellam" - Vidhu Prathap
- "Maya Sandhye" - K. J. Yesudas, Jyotsna

== Reception ==
A critic from Sify wrote that "On the whole Kamal has dished out an artificial visual bubblegum movie for those who crave for sugarcoated entertainment". A critic from Nowrunning wrote that "The movie is okay, but people expect more from Kamal with such an impressive casting".
