= Nadirshah =

Indian actor, mimicry artist and film director

M. S. Nadirshah
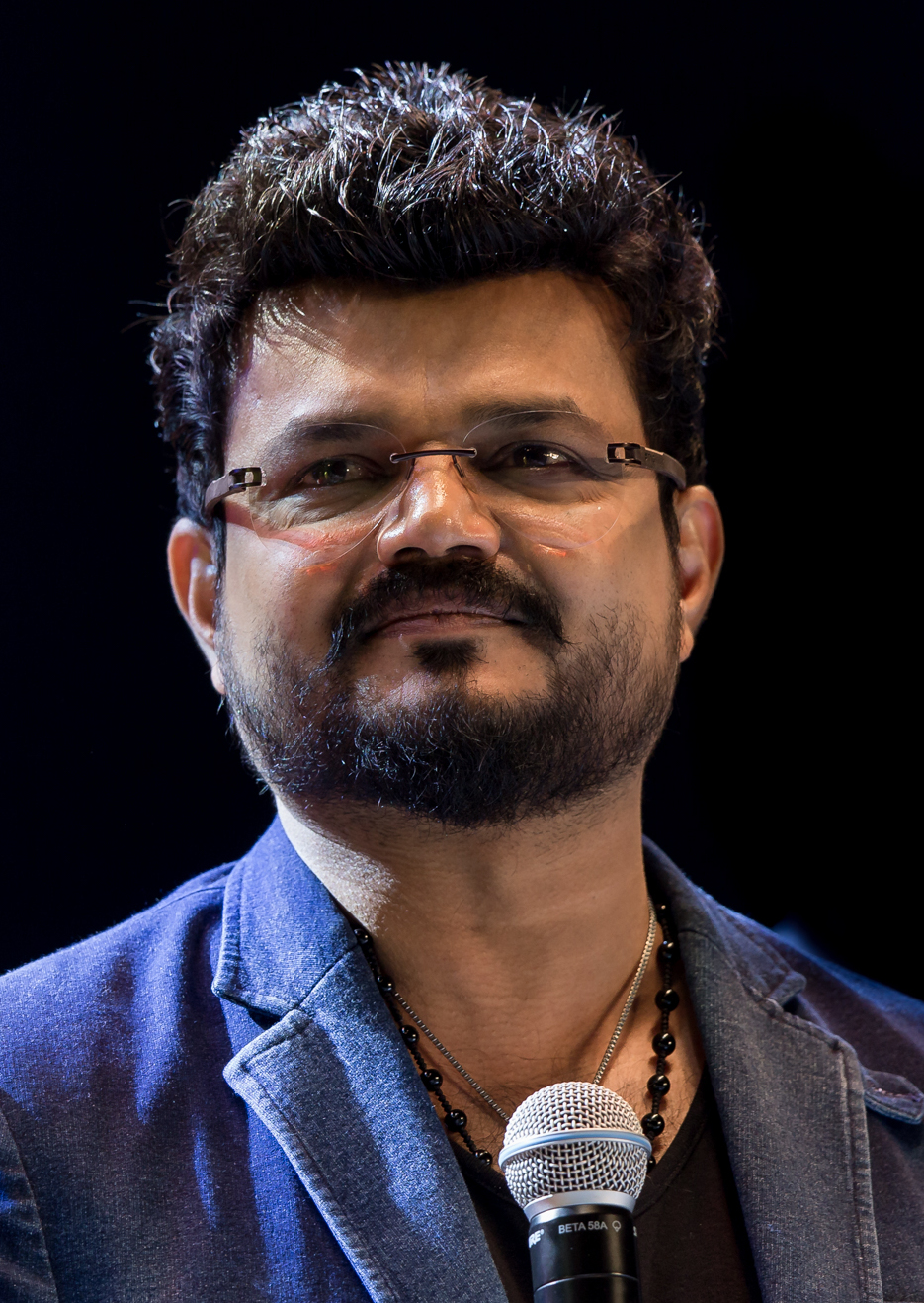
- Nadirshah during Kairali TV event in Doha, 2016
- Born: M. S. Nadirshah; 20 May 1966 (age 60); Kochi, Kerala, India
- Education: St. Paul's College, Kalamassery, Maharaja's College, Ernakulam, Mahatma Gandhi University
- Occupations: Film director; music director; singer; actor; comedian; mimicry artist; lyricist; television host
- Years active: 1992–present
- Notable work: Amar Akbar Anthony; Kattappanayile Rithwik Roshan; Mera Naam Shaji; Keshu Ee Veedinte Nadhan; Eesho
- Website: nadhirshah.com

Nadirshah is an Indian actor, film director, music composer, playback singer, lyricist, mimicry artist, comedian, and television host, who works in Malayalam films, television and on-stage. He has also done several supporting roles in Malayalam cinema. His areas of contribution in music include playback singing, lyrics and composing. He made his directorial debut with the Malayalam film Amar Akbar Anthony (2015). His second directorial was Kattappanayile Rithwik Roshan (2016).

== Early life ==
Nadirshah was born in Kochi as the eldest of five children of M.A. Sulaiman and P.S. Suhara. He did his primary education from FACT Eastern UP School and FACT High School, Eloor, Ernakulam. He pursued his pre-degree from St. Paul's College, Kalamassery and graduated from Maharaja's College, Ernakulam. He worked at Carborundum Universal, Kochi for a short time.

== Career ==
Nadirshah started his career at the age of 10 when he joined Rajan Antony's SCS Orchestra, Koonamavu.

== Filmography ==
=== As director ===
Year	Title	Notes
2015	Amar Akbar Anthony	Winner- 2015 Asiavision Awards for Popular Director
2016	Kattappanayile Rithwik Roshan	Winner- Flowers Gulf Film Awards for Best Director
2019	Mera Naam Shaji	
2021	Keshu Ee Veedinte Nadhan	Direct OTT release on Disney+ Hotstar
2022	Eesho	Direct OTT release on SonyLIV
2024	Once Upon a Time in Kochi	
2026	Magic Mushrooms	

=== As actor ===
Year	Film	Role	Notes
1992	Kasargode Khadarbhai	Mimicry artist	
1994	Bheesmacharya	Augustine	
1994	Manathe Kottaram	Sabu	
1995	Ezharakoottam	Antappan	
1995	Alancherry Thambrakkal	Aravindan	
1996	Adukkalarahasyam Angaadipaattu	Alex Thottathi	
1996	Dilliwala Rajakumaran	Balan	
1997	My Dear Kuttichathan		
1997	Newspaper Boy	Rasheed	
1997	Kudamaattam		
1997	The Good Boys	Unni	
1998	Meenakshi Kalyaanam		
1999	Gaandhiyan	Raheed	
2000	Mera Naam Joker	Sunny	
2001	Randam Bhavam	Mehaboob	
2001	Sharjah To Sharjah		
2001	Raavanaprabhu	Salaam	
2001	Korappan The Great	Venu	
2001	Dosth	Dileep's Friend	
2002	Bamboo Boys	Velumban	
2003	Vasanthamalika	Abhilash	
2010	Kaaryasthan	Himself	Cameo appearance
2014	To Let Ambadi Talkies	Rahman	
2016	Shajahanum Pareekuttiyum	Dr. Titus Alex	
2016	Kattappanayile Rithwik Roshan	Film director	Cameo appearance
2018	Daivame Kaithozham K. Kumar Akanam	Singer	Cameo appearance
2018	Kuttanadan Marpappa	Doctor	
2019	Allu Ramendran	Film director	
2019	Shubharathri	Shanavas	
2021	Keshu Ee Veedinte Nadhan	Shop owner	Cameo appearance
2022	Eesho	Bus passenger	Cameo appearance

=== As playback singer ===
- Mera Naam Shaji (2019)
- Hello Dubaikkaran (2017)
- Pretham Undu Sookshikkuka (2017)
- Welcome to Central Jail (2016)
- Shajahanum Pareekuttiyum (2016)
- Amar Akbar Anthony (2015)
- Ring Master (2015)
- Sringaravelan (2013)
- Ben Johnson (2005)
- Vettam (2004)
- Meenakshi Kalyanam (1998)

=== As lyricist ===
- Vettam (2004)
- Ben Johnson (2005)
- Pandippada (2005)
- Sound Thoma (2013)
- Sringaravelan (2013)
- Ring Master (2014)
- Thinkal Muthal Velli Vare (2015)
- Amar Akbar Anthony (2015)
- Shajahanum Pareekuttiyum (2016)

=== As composer ===
Year	Film
1998	Meenakshi Kalyanam
2008	Kabadi Kabadi
2013	Sringaravelan
2015	Amar Akbar Anthony
2015	Two Countries
2016	Shajahanum Pareekuttiyum
2016	Welcome to Central Jail
2016	Kattappanayile Rithwik Roshan
2017	Hello Dubaikkaran
2018	Daivame Kaithozham K. Kumar Akanam
2018	Aanakkallan
2019	An International Local Story
2019	Mera Naam Shaji
2019	Oru Yamandan Premakadha
2022	Eesho

=== Television ===
Year	Program	Role	Channel	Notes
2010	Kaliyum Chiriyum	Host	Surya	
2010	Karyasthanu 100/100	Host	Asianet	Promotionial show
2010	Star Ragging	Host	Asianet	
2012	Mylanchy	Judge	Asianet Middle East	
2012–2013	Star Ragging	Host	Kairali	
2013	Kings of comedy	Host	Mediaone	Special show
2013	Onapattum Chiriyum Puttum	Host	Mediaone	Special show
2014	Cinema Chirimaa	Host	Mazhavil Manorama	
2014	December Most	Singer	ACV	
2015	Maryadaramanum Changathiyum	Host	Mazhavil Manorama	Special show
2016	Dhe Chef	Guest Judge	Mazhavil Manorama	
2016–2019	Comedy Utsavam	Judge	Flowers	
2020–present	Comedy Masters	Judge	Amrita	
2020	Comedy Stars Season 2	Judge	Asianet	
