= Su Su Sudhi Vathmeekam =

- Theatrical release poster
- Directed by: Ranjith Sankar
- Screenplay by: Ranjith Sankar; Abhayakumar
- Story by: Sudheendran Avittathoor
- Produced by: Jayasurya; Ranjith Sankar
- Starring: Jayasurya; Shivada Nair; Swathy Narayanan; Aju Varghese
- Cinematography: Vinod Illampally
- Edited by: V.Saajan
- Music by: Bijibal
- Production company: Dreams N Beyond
- Distributed by: Central Pictures Release
- Release date: 11 November 2015
- Running time: 134 minutes
- Country: India
- Language: Malayalam

Su Su Sudhi Vathmeekam is a 2015 Malayalam comedy-drama film directed, co-written, and co-produced by Ranjith Sankar. The film stars Jayasurya in the titular role who also co-produced it under the banner of Dreams N Beyond. Vinod Illampally has done the cinematography and Bijibal has composed the score and soundtrack. The screenplay was written by Ranjith Sankar and Abhayakumar. The central character is inspired by a real-life person, Sudheendran Avittathur. The film was released on 11 November 2015 on the occasion of Diwali to positive reviews. Jayasurya won national and Kerala state special jury award for his performance.

== Plot ==
The story is the journey of Sudhi Valmeekam who struggles with stammering from his childhood.

The movie starts in Bangalore where a middle-aged Sudhi is serving as the branch manager of Karur Vysya Bank. He comes to the branch on a Sunday to check the making of a movie which stars Mukesh and Greagon. Greagon turns out to be Sudhi's old friend. Sudhi is expected to take the overnight bus to Kerala after the shoot. The shooting of the movie takes up more time than expected leading Sudhi to miss his bus. Sudhi gets tagged with Mukesh to reach his hometown.

On the way, Mukesh warms up to Sudhi after an initial tussle. Sudhi narrates his troubles in childhood and youth caused by stammering. A younger Sudhi in his twenties is an office staff in a school where the administrator, Kuruppu, is abusive to him. He has a group of friends, including Greagon, the physical education teacher. Sudhi is close to Sreedevi, the school principal, and her deaf and mute daughter, Tara. His parents are very supportive, but are concerned about Sudhi's stammering. Sudhi lacks confidence and everyday activities become nightmares as he struggles to speak up when required. Sudhi undergoes therapy from a holistic doctor whose methods are questionable and are not effective.

Sudhi meets Sheela for a marriage alliance, and they both like each other. Sheela appears to understand and accept Sudhi's condition. However, with some incidents during the engagement and afterward, Sheela becomes uncomfortable with the condition. She takes Sudhi to a speech therapist, Kalyani, who categorically states that there is no cure for stammering, and Sudhi has to learn to accept it. Sheela breaks off the engagement. This leads Sudhi into a deep depression, and he stops going to school for a while.

Back in school, the owner of the school, Vijay Babu, arrives and works with the staff to achieve ISO certification for the school. Sudhi meets Kalyani again who joined as a temporary communication teacher. Sudhi is angry at Kalyani to start with, but Kalyani manages to convince Sudhi to accept stammering as an incurable condition which can be managed. They grow close, and Kalyani proposes to Sudhi which he rejects as he states that he will be working to become someone worthy to marry Kalyani. Kalyani leaves for Bangalore.

Trouble breaks at school when Sreedevi discovers that the administrator, Kuruppu, has been swindling money using Sudhi from the school. Before she goes to the police, Kuruppu manages to get her arrested on the same charges. In Sreedevi's absence, Sudhi takes care of Tara. Kuruppu threatens Sudhi not to reveal the truth. Sudhi musters the courage to go to the police with documents implicating Kuruppu and releasing Sreedevi. At the end of it, Sudhi quits the job at school.

The incident gives Sudhi the confidence to explore the world outside. He studies hard, secures interviews, and finally lands a job with Karur Vysya Bank in Bangalore. When he gets promoted to assistant manager through hard work, he meets Kalyani and proposes to her.

Mukesh and Sudhi arrive at Sudhi's hometown. Mukesh meets the characters in Sudhi's story. He learns that Sudhi has married Kalyani, and the school is felicitating Tara and Sudhi. Mukesh leaves happily for his next shooting, and Sudhi rekindles with his hometown.

== Cast ==
- Jayasurya as Sudhi Vathmeekam
  - Advaith Jayasurya as young Sudhi
- Sshivada as Kalyani, a Speech Therapist
- Swathy Narayanan as Sheela
- Mukesh as a fictionalised version of himself (extended cameo)
- Aju Varghese as Greagon
- Anson Paul as Vijay Babu
- Arjun Nandhakumar as Mohan
- Irshad as Kurup
- TG Ravi as Sudhi's father
- K. P. A. C. Lalitha as Sudhi's mother
- Muthumani as Sreedevi, School Principal
- Sarath Das
- Sunil Sukhada as Holistic Doctor
- Ranjith Sankar as film director (cameo)
- Sathi Premji as Kalyani's Grandmother
- Suja Menon as Nirmala
- Roshni Singh as Tara Menon
  - Tara Ranjith Sankar as Junior Tara Menon
- Gokulan as Mukesh's Assistant

== Production ==
The film's initial planning began in 2010. The director announced that the project was going to be his next after his film, Arjunan Saakshi. But, the film materialized after the director's fifth film, Varsham. He announced it would star Jayasurya in the titular role who had earlier worked with him in Punyalan Agarbattis which he had co-produced. The film began shooting in the summer of 2015 and was released on 20 November 2015. The shoot began in August 2015 in Bangalore. The crew shot in various locations, including Erode, Coimbatore, Alathur, and Palakkad. Ranjith Sankar wrote on his blog that this was a film he wanted to make for a long time. Jayasurya and Ranjith last teamed up for Punyalan Agarbattis.

== Box office ==
The film was both a commercial and critical success. The film collected ₹1.55 crore (US$160,000) in three days of release and ₹3.36 crore (US$350,000) in seven days. It earned ₹6.08 crore (US$630,000) within 18 days of initial release.

== Soundtrack ==
Su Su Sudhi Vathmeekam

Soundtrack album by Bijibal
- Released: 2015
- Genre: Film soundtrack
- Label: Muzik 247
- Producers: Ranjith Sankar, Jayasurya

Bijibal chronology
Salt Mango Tree (2015)	Su Su Sudhi Vathmeekam (2015)	My God (2015)

The film's background score and songs are composed by Bijibal. The lyrics were written by Santhosh Varma. P Jayachandran, Swetha Mohan, and Ganesh Sundaram are the principal singers. The music was released through the label Muzik 247.

No.	Title	Artist(s)	Length
1	"Ente Janalarikil"	P. Jayachandran	03:05
2	"Kayamboo"	Swetha Mohan, Thripunithura Girija Varma	03:09
3	"Raavinte"	Ganesh Sundaram	02:13

== Awards ==
National Film Awards

- National Film Award – Special Mention (actor) - Jayasurya

Kerala State Film Awards

- Kerala State Film Award – Special Jury Award - Jayasurya
