= Veber =

Veber or Véber is a surname. Notable people with the surname include:

- Francis Veber (born 1937), French film director, screenwriter, producer and playwright
- György Véber (born 1969), Hungarian footballer
- Jiří Veber (born 1968), Czech ice hockey player
- Pierre Veber (1869–1942), French playwright and writer
- Raymonde Jones Veber (1917–2016), French tennis player
- Roman Veber (born 1969), Slovak ice hockey player
- Vladimir Veber (1941–2026), Moldovan football player
