= List of Malayalam films of 2006 =

The following is a list of Malayalam films released in the year 2006

== Films ==
Mo		Title	Director	Screenplay	Cast
J A N	1	Lakshmi	Khader Hassan	Khader Hassan	Venkatesh, Nayanthara
J A N	7	Chakkilliye Changathi	Steve Cannon	Clare Elstow	Tom Eimy James
J A N	26	Lion	Joshiy	Udaya Krishna, Siby K. Thomas	Dileep, Kavya Madhavan
J A N	28	Achanurangatha Veedu	Lal Jose	Babu Janardhanan	Salim Kumar, Samvrutha Sunil, Muktha, Prithviraj, Indrajith
F E B	16	Ennittum	Ranjith Lal		Dinu Dennis, Sidharth Bharathan, Kaniha, Swarnamalya
F E B	17	Out of Syllabus	Viswanathan		Arjun Sasi, Parvathy
F E B	25	Chiratta Kalippattangal	Jose Thomas		Mukesh
F E B	28	Mukhamariyaathe	P. Rajasekharan		Rajan P. Dev, Siddique
M A R	3	Lanka	A. K. Sajan	A. K. Sajan	Suresh Gopi, Mamta Mohandas
M A R	15	Ravanan	Jojo K. Varghees		Kalabhavan Mani, Megha Jasmine
M A R	3	Vargam	M. Padmakumar	M. Padmakumar	Prithviraj, Renuka Menon
M A R	26	Kilukkam Kilukilukkam	Sandhya Mohan	Udaya Krishna, Siby K. Thomas	Mohanlal, Kunchacko Boban, Jayasurya, Kavya Madhavan
M A R	7	Madhuchandralekha	Rajasenan	Raghunath Paleri	Jayaram, Urvashi, Mamta Mohandas
M A R	9	Raashtram	Anil C. Menon		Suresh Gopi, Madhu, Laya
M A R	11	Chinthamani Kolacase	Shaji Kailas	A. K. Sajan, A. K. Santhosh	Suresh Gopi, Bhavana, Thilakan
A P R	14	Rasathanthram	Satyan Anthikad	Satyan Anthikad	Mohanlal, Meera Jasmine, Bharat Gopy
A P R	15	Thuruppu Gulan	Johny Antony	Udaya Krishna, Siby K. Thomas	Mammooty, Sneha
A P R	14	Pachakuthira	Kamal	T. A. Shahid	Dileep, Gopika, Salim Kumar
A P R	28	Balram vs. Tharadas	I. V. Sasi	S. N. Swamy, T. Damodharan	Mammootty, Katrina Kaif
M A Y		Pulijanmam	Priyanandanan	N. Prabhakaran, N. Sasidharan	Murali, Samvrutha Sunil
M A Y	1	Vadakkumnadhan	Shajoon Karyal	Gireesh Puthenchery	Mohanlal, Padmapriya, Kavya Madhavan, Biju Menon
M A Y	8	Kisan	Sibi Malayil		Biju Menon, Kalabhavan Mani, Bhavana, Geethu Mohandas
J U N	14	Nottam	Sasi Paravur		Arun, Samvrutha Sunil, Nedumudi Venu
J U N	16	Highway Police (2006 film)	Prasad Valachery		Babu Antony, Riyaz Khan, Indraja
J U N	20	Prajapathy	Ranjith	Ranjith	Mammotty, Siddique, Aditi Rao Hydari
J U N	8	Ammathottil	Rajesh Amanakara		Biju Menon, Mohini
J U N	14	Ashwaroodan	Jayaraj		Suresh Gopi, Padmapriya
J U L	7	Chess	Raj Babu	Udaya Krishna, Siby K. Thomas	Dileep, Bhavana
J U L	9	Narakasuran	K. R. Ramdas		Kalabhavan Mani, Riyaz Khan, Indraja
J U L	16	Chacko Randaaman	Sunil Karyatukara	Biju Devassy	Kalabhavan Mani, Jyothirmayi, Mohini
A U G	27	Keerthi Chakra	Major Ravi	Major Ravi	Mohanlal, Jiiva, Gopika
A U G	1	Aanachandam	Jayaraj	Sudheesh John	Jayaram, Ramya Nambeeshan
A U G	2	Kalabham	Anil		Bala, Navya Nair, Arun, Manikuttan
A U G	17	Red Salute	Vinod Vijayan	Sajeevan	Kalabhavan Mani, Sreedevika
A U G	14	Achante Ponnumakkal	Akhilesh Guruvilas		Murali, Karthika, Sudheesh
A U G	25	Moonnamathoral	V. K. Prakash		Jayaram, Jyothirmayi, Samvritha Sunil
A U G	26	Bhargavacharitham Moonam Khandam	Joemon	Sreenivasan	Mammotty, Sreenivasan, Rahman, Padmapriya
A U G	27	Mahasamudram	S. Janardanan	S. Janardanan	Mohanlal, Laila, Rahman
A U G	30	Classmates	Lal Jose	James Albert	Prithviraj, Kavya Madhavan, Narain, Indrajith, Jayasurya
A U G	2	Mouryan	Kailas Rao		Abbas, Geethu Mohandas
S E P	4	Pathaaka	K. Madhu	Robin Thirumala	Suresh Gopi, Arun, Sheela, Renuka Menon, Navya Nair
S E P	6	The Don	Shaji Kailas		Dileep, Lal, Gopika
S E P	8	Saira	Dr. Biju		Navya Nair, Nedumudi Venu
O C T	11	Ekantham	Madhu Kaithapram		Thilakan, Murali
O C T	18	Pothan Vava	Joshi	Benny P. Nayarambalam	Mammooty, Usha Uthup, Gopika, Bijukuttan
O C T	25	Photographer	Ranjan Pramod	Ranjan Pramod	Mohanlal, Neethu Shetty
O C T	27	Bada Dosth	Viji Thampi	Babu Pallasseri	Suresh Gopi, Siddique, Jyothirmayi
N O V	6	Chakkaramuthu	Lohithadas	Lohithadas	Dileep, Kavya Madhavan, Jishnu Raghavan
N O V	10	Vaasthavam	M. Padmakumar	Babu Janardhanan	Prithviraj, Kavya Madhavan, Jagathy Sreekumar, Samvrutha
N O V	8	Yes Your Honour	V. M. Vinu	T. Damodharan	Sreenivasan, Padmapriya, Sai Kumar
N O V	5	Karutha Pakshikal	Kamal	Kamal	Mammootty, Padmapriya
D E C	11	Jayam	Sonu Sisupal		Anandraj, Kiran, Rekha
D E C	12	Pakal	M. A. Nishad	Susmesh Chandroth	Prithviraj, Jyothirmayi
D E C	18	Shyaamam	Shrivallabhan	Shrivallabhan	KPAC Lalitha, Krishna, I. M. Vijayan
D E C	7	Oruvan	Vinu Anand	Raji Nair	Indrajith Sukumaran, Meera Vasudev, Lal, Prithviraj
D E C	15	Baba Kalyani	Shaji Kailas	S. N. Swamy	Mohanlal, Mamta Mohandas, Biju Menon, Indrajith
D E C	15	Smart City	Unnikrishnan B.	Unnikrishnan B.	Suresh Gopi, Gopika, Manoj K. Jayan, Murali
D E C	15	Notebook	Rosshan Andrrews	Bobby Sanjay	Roma Asrani, Parvathy, Maria Roy, Skanda, Suresh Gopi
D E C	22	Palunku	Blessy	Blessy	Mammootty, Jagathy Sreekumar, Lakshmi Sharma
D E C	24	Kanaka Simhasanam	Rajasenan	Biju Vattappara	Jayaram, Karthika, Lakshmi Gopalaswamy
		Anuvaadamillathe		I. V. Sasi	
		Colourful		Naser Azeez	
		Drishtantham			
		Onnara Vattu			
		Thanthra	K. J. Bose		Siddique

Opening	Title	Director(s)	Original film		Cast	Ref.
Opening	Title	Director(s)	Film	Language	Cast	Ref.
	Aarya	Sukumar	Arya	Telugu	Allu Arjun, Anuradha Mehta	
	Chathrapathi	SS Rajamouli	Chathrapathi	Telugu	Prabhas, Shriya Saran	
	Lakshmi	VV Vinayak	Lakshmi	Telugu	Daggubati Venkatesh, Nayanthara	
	Dubai Seenu	Srinu Vaitla	Dubai Seenu	Telugu	Ravi Teja, Nayanthara	
