= Kalabhavan Haneef =

Indian actor (died 2023)

- Born: 1959 or 1960; Mattancherry, Kerala, India
- Died: 9 November 2023 (aged 63); Kochi, Kerala, India
- Occupations: Actor; impressionist
- Years active: 1991–2023
- Spouse: Waheeda
- Children: 2

Kalabhavan Haneef (1959 or 1960 – 9 November 2023) was an Indian actor and impressionist in Malayalam cinema. He made his debut with the film Cheppukilukkana Changathi (1991).

== Career ==
Haneef started impersonations while in school, and later began his career as a sales person and impressionist. He was closely affiliated with Cochin Kalabhavan, which was the starting point for many actors. Haneef also followed the practice of Kalabhavan alumni by appending the organization's name to his stage name. Haneef excelled in impersonating actors Nedumudi Venu and Raghavan.

Haneef was very popular in India and abroad because of his stage shows. He played small roles in Malayalam movies, but was more successful in television, playing important roles in serials such as Minnukettu, Nadhaswaram, Abi's Corner, Comediyum Mimicsum Pinne Njanum, Manassiloru Mazhavillu, and Tilana Tilana.

His debut film was Cheppukilukkana Changathi (1991). He later acted in more than 150 films.

== Personal life and death ==
Haneef was married to Waheeda, with whom he had two children. After two days of hospitalisation for breathing problems, he died in Kochi on 9 November 2023, at the age of 63.

== Filmography ==
Year	Title	Role	Notes
1991	Cheppukilukkana Changathi		
1991	Sandesham		
1991	Nettippattom		
1991	Godfather		
1991	Mimics Parade		
1992	Kasarkode Khaderbai	Mimicry artist	
1992	Ellarum Chollanu		
1992	Mr. & Mrs	Office Staff	
1992	Manthrikacheppu		
1992	Congratulations Miss Anitha Menon	Auto Driver	
1992	Pravachakan		
1992	Yoddha		Cameo in Song
1992	My Dear Muthachan		
1994	Malappuram Haji Mahanaya Joji	Khader	
1994	Vadhu Doctoraanu		
1994	CID Unnikrishnan B.A., B.Ed.	Postman	
1995	Mimics Action 500	Mimicry artist	
1995	Manikya Chempazhuka		
1995	Puthukottayile Puthumanavalan		
1995	Aadyathe Kanmani		
1995	Tom & Jerry	Policeman	
1995	Kalamasseriyil Kalyanayogam	Prathapan	
1995	Kalyanji Anandji	Broker	
1995	Kidilol Kidilam		
1996	Swapna Lokathe Balabhaskaran	Marriage Broker	
1996	Sathyabhamakkoru Premalekhanam	Vallyaveedan's right-hand	
1996	Nandagopante Kusruthikal		
1997	Poonilamazha		
1997	Suvarna Simhasanam		
1997	The Good Boys		
1998	Vismayam	Nalinakshan	
1998	Gloria Fernandes From USA		
2000	Thenkasipattanam	Prospective groom	
2001	Ee Parakkum Thalika	Groom	
2001	Dupe Dupe Dupe		
2001	Goa		
2001	Desam		
2001	Nalacharitham Naalam Divasam		
2001	Jameendaar		
2002	Bamboo Boys		
2002	Kunjikoonan		
2003	Gramophone	Union Leader	
2003	C.I.D. Moosa	House Broker	
2004	Thalamelam		
2004	Sethurama Iyer CBI		
2004	C. I. Mahadevan 5 Adi 4 Inchu	Varkey	
2005	Pandippada	Bhasi's friend	
2005	Kochi Rajavu		
2005	Ben Johnson		
2005	Nerariyan CBI		
2006	Pachakuthira	ATM security	
2006	Kilukkam Kilukilukkam	Driver	
2006	Thuruppugulan		
2006	Bada Dosth		
2007	Chotta Mumbai	Marriage broker	
2007	Inspector Garud	Auto Driver Ajayan	
2007	Vinodayathra	Hotel Receptionist	
2007	Nagaram		
2008	Kerala Police	Lodge receptionist	
2008	Annan Thambi		
2008	Twenty:20		
2008	Crazy Gopalan	Pushpan	
2009	Chattambinadu	Villager	
2009	Currency	Konkani Man	
2009	2 Harihar Nagar	Driver	
2010	Kanmazha Peyyum Munpe	Gopalan	
2010	Again Kasargod Khader Bhai	Begger	
2010	Marykkundoru Kunjaadu	Bus Conductor	
2011	Kudumbasree Travels		
2011	Karayilekku Oru Kadal Dooram		
2011	Maharaja Talkies	Dubai Abdullah	
2011	Manikyakkallu	Radhakrishnan	
2011	Seniors	Hostel Security Guard	
2011	Venicile Vyapari		
2011	Doctor Love		
2011	Kottarthil Kutty Bhootham		
2011	Killadi Raman		
2011	Vellaripravinte Changathi		
2012	Thalsamayam Oru Penkutty		
2012	Ustad Hotel	Samu	
2012	Ee Adutha Kaalathu	Mammootty	
2012	Mallu Singh	Drunker	
2012	Cobra		
2012	Idiots		
2012	Husbands in Goa		
2012	Scene Onnu Nammude Veedu		
2012	Lekshmi Vilasom Renuka Makan Reghuraman		
2012	Chapters		
2012	101 Weddings		
2013	Sound Thoma	Tea Shop Owner	
2013	Namboothiri Yuvavu @43	Govindan	
2013	Drishyam	Cinema projector operator	
2013	Weeping Boy	Jose	
2013	Meow Meow Karimpoocha		
2013	Proprietors: Kammath & Kammath	Broker	
2013	Nadodimannan	Vasu	
2013	Romans	Lottery Salesman	
2013	Vallatha Pahayan		
2013	On the Way		
2014	Thomson Villa		
2014	Ulsaha Committee		
2014	You Can Do it		
2014	Praise the Lord	Police constable	
2014	Malayaalanaadu		
2014	Kunjananthante Kada		
2014	Seconds		
2014	Ring Master		
2014	Happy Journey		
2014	Avatharam		
2014	100 Degree Celsius		
2014	Manglish	Chayakaran Mani	
2015	Pathemari	Marriage broker	
2015	Amar Akbar Anthony	Thattukada owner	
2015	Kanthari		
2015	Fireman	Juice seller	
2015	My God		
2015	Aana Mayil Ottakam		Segment: Fill in the blanks
2016	Paavada	Varghese	
2016	Valliyum Thetti Pulliyum Thetti	Nair	
2016	Marubhoomiyile Aana		
2016	Welcome to Central Jail	Vishwanath's assistant	
2016	Thoppil Joppan	Announcer	
2016	Kattappanayile Rithwik Roshan	Sasi/Soman	
2017	Georgettan's Pooram	Vareed	
2017	Puthan Panam	Antappan	
2017	Pretham Undu Sookshikuka		
2017	Kuntham		
2017	Pullikkaran Staraa	School teacher	
2017	Sherlock Toms	Jolly	
2017	Lavakusha	TTR	
2017	Vimaanam	Doctor	
2018	Vikadakumaran	Sabu	
2018	Parole	Monis	
2018	Panchavarnathatha	Jimmy's assistant	
2018	Uncle	Bapputti	
2018	Chanakya Thanthram	Vishwan	
2018	Ashiq Vanna Divasam	Mesthri	
2018	Oru Pazhaya Bomb Kadha	Varkichan	
2018	Oru Kuttanadan Blog	Varkichan	
2018	Chalakkudykkaran Changathy	Kannan Unni	
2018	Nervarennu Immani Cherinjoo Taa...		
2018	Thanaha	Drunk Man	
2019	Kodathi Samaksham Balan Vakeel	Colony resident	
2019	Neeyum Njanum		
2019	Thelivu		
2019	Puzhikkadakan		
2019	Oru Pathaam Classile Pranayam		
2019	Isakkinte Ithihasam		
2019	Subharathri		
2019	An International Local Story	Moideen	
2019	Children's Park		
2019	Sidharthan Enna Njan	Thankappan	
2019	Under World	Barber	
2019	Margamkali		
2019	Driving Licence	Pillai	
2020	Dhamaka		
2021	The Priest	Anand's father	
2021	One	Thomas, Security officer	
2021	Vidhi		
2021	Yuvam	KSRTC Employee	
2022	Oruthee		
2022	Puzhu		
2022	Laljose		
2022	Aaraattu		
2023	Vanitha		
2023	Aathma		
2023	Gaffor Ka Dhosth		
2023	Oru Paka Nadan Premam		
2023	Aalankam		
2023	2018	Karunan	
2023	Jaladhara Pumpset Since 1962		
2023	Garudan	Tea shop owner	
2023	Kaathal – The Core	Judge	
2024	Once Upon a Time in Kochi		
2024	Samadhana Pusthakam		
