= Njan Kodiswaran =

Njan Kodeeswaran
- Directed by: Jose Thomas
- Written by: Joycee
- Screenplay by: Govardhan
- Produced by: P.C. Shaji, Renji under the banner Prasadam Cinema.
- Starring: Jagadheesh, Sudheesh, Baiju, Innocent, Rajan P. Dev, Pappu, Oduvil, M. S. Thrippunithura, Mahesh, Jose Pallissery, Vinodhini, Akshara, Nina Kurup, Kaviyoor Ponnamma, Zeenath, Aranmula Ponnamma, Aswathi Alex, etc.
- Cinematography: Venugopal
- Edited by: L. Bhoominathan
- Music by: Ouseppachan; Lyrics: Gireesh Puthencherry
- Production company: Prasadam Cinema
- Distributed by: Prasadam Cinema
- Release date: 1994
- Country: India
- Language: Malayalam

Njan Kodiswaran is a 1994 Indian Malayalam-language film, directed by Jose Thomas. The film stars Jagadish, Innocent, Sudheesh, Baiju, Rajan P. Dev, Kuthiravattom Pappu, Oduvil Unnikrishnan, M. S. Thrippunnithra, Jose Pallissery, Vinodhini, Akshara, Nina Kurup, Kaviyoor Ponnamma, Zeenath, Aranmula Ponnamma, etc. The film has musical score by Ouseppachan.

== Cast ==
- Jagadish as Gopi
- Vinodini as Maya
- Innocent as Appunni Nair
- Kaviyoor Ponnamma as Janaki
- Mahesh as Vijayan
- Rajan P. Dev as Mathachen
- Aranmula Ponnamma as Grandmother
- Bobby Kottarakkara as Astrologer Krishna Panicker
- Jose Pellissery as Bank manager Venugopala Pothuval
- Kuthiravattam Pappu as Menon
- M. S. Thripunithura as Panattu Govindan Nair
- Neena Kurup as Indhu
- Oduvil Unnikrishnan as Panattu Sankaran Nair
- Sudheesh as Hari
- Baiju as Sunny
- Hakim Rawther as man at mental asylum

== Soundtrack ==
The music was composed by Ouseppachan.

No.	Song	Singers	Lyrics	Length (m:ss)
1	"Medakkaate Koodevaa"	K. J. Yesudas, K. S. Chithra	Gireesh Puthenchery	
2	"Varavarnna Melayaay"	K. J. Yesudas	Gireesh Puthenchery	
