= Udaykrishna–Sibi K. Thomas =

Indian screenwriting duo

- Born: Kerala, India
- Occupation: Screenwriters
- Years active: 1995 – Present

Udaykrishna–Sibi K. Thomas is an Indian screenwriting duo known for their works in Malayalam cinema. Most of their works are in the comedy, action crime film and mass genre. They wrote films such as Mattupetti Machan (1998), Udayapuram Sulthan (1999), Dhosth (2001), C.I.D. Moosa (2003), Pulival Kalyanam (2003) Runway (2004), Kochi Rajavu (2005), Thuruppu Gulan (2006), Twenty:20 (2008), Pokkiri Raja (2010), Kaaryasthan (2010), Christian Brothers (2011), Mayamohini (2012), Mr. Marumakan (2012), Kammath & Kammath(2013), Rajadhi Raja (2014) and Ivan Maryadaraman (2015).

The duo parted in 2015. Udayakrishna continued as a scriptwriter. Udayakrishna's first script as a solo writer was Pulimurugan (2016) which became the first Malayalam film to gross over ₹100-150 crore and became the highest-grossing Malayalam film.

== Career ==
Both Udayakrishna and Sibi started their careers as assistant directors. Sibi assisted Balu Kiriyath and Sandhya Mohan, while Udayakrishna assisted screenwriter A. R. Mukesha and was assistant director under Balu Kiriyath, Ali Akbar, K. Madhu and Venu B. Nair. Manoj K. Jayan prodded them into a partnership and agreed to star in their directorial debut. However, that project did not work out. Subsequently, they wrote their first script, Hitler Brothers (1997), for Sandhya Mohan, followed by Mayajalam for Balu Kiriyath. Both films failed at the box office. The duo's first hit came through Mattuppetti Machan directed by Jose Thomas, followed by Udayapuram Sulthan. Then came Sundra Purushan, which was a moderate success.

It was followed by Rajasenan's successful movies, Darling Darling, Malayalimamanu Vanakkam and C.I.D. Moosa was a success. They associated with Johny Antony in most of his directorial ventures thereafter, including the commercially successful Kochi Rajavu and Thuruppu Gulan. They worked with veteran director Joshiy in Runway, Lion and July 4, and in the landmark Malayalam film Twenty:20. Twenty:20 was produced by AMMA in association with Dileep's Grand Productions and starred most major actors of Malayalam cinema. The film became the highest grossing Malayalam film of all time and brought appreciations for Udayakrishna and Sibi.

Twenty:20 was followed by Ee Pattanathil Bhootham, which was panned by the critics and an average grosser. In 2010, they made a comeback with Pokkiri Raja, which went on to become a big success and the highest-grossing film of the year. However, critical responses for Pokkiri Raja were mostly mixed. They scripted debutante Thomson K. Thomas's Kaaryasthan. Despite negative reviews from critics, the film closely followed Pokkiri Raja in collection records of the year. Their only film in 2011 was Christian Brothers with Joshiy, which became a success. They scripted two films in 2012, Mayamohini and Mr. Marumakan. The former was a success and was among the highest-grossing films of the year while the latter, despite heavy criticism, became an average hit. The last release in their combination is Ivan Maryadaraman.

=== Udaykrishna (as solo writer) ===
Later in 2016, Udaykrishna wrote script for Pulimurugan directed by Vysakh which was second highest-grossing Malayalam film of all time. Then he wrote scripts for Masterpiece (2017) directed by Ajai Vasudev and Aanakkallan (2018) directed by Suresh Divakar both received mixed reviews but were commercial success. In 2019 he scripted Madhura Raja which was a sequel off to Pokkiri Raja. Even though it received mixed to positive reviews, and it grossed 100 crores from box office. In 2022, he wrote two scripts for Mohanlal starring films Aaraattu directed by B. Unnikrishnan and Monster directed by Vysakh. Both films became box-office flops. In 2023, he scripted two films for Christopher which was directed by B. Unnikrishnan and starred Mammootty and Vinay Rai in the lead roles and Bandra which was directed by Arun Gopy and starred Dileep and Tamannaah Bhatia in the lead role. Christopher received mixed reviews from critics and became an average hit at the box office., while Bandra received negative reviews from critics and it is underperformed at the box office.

== Personal life ==
Udaykrishnan is married to Manju and has a son named Chandik. Sibi is married to Jisha and has a son and daughter.

== Filmography ==
=== Udaykrishna–Sibi K. Thomas (as writer duo) ===
Year	Film	Director	Notes
1997	Hitler Brothers	Sandhya Mohan	Udayakrishna acts in this film as a thief.
1998	Meenakshi Kalyanam	Jose Thomas	
1998	Mayajalam	Balu Kiriyath	
1998	Amma Ammaayiyamma	Sandhya Mohan	
1998	Mattupetti Machan	Jose Thomas	Udayakrishna acts as a driver.
1999	Udayapuram Sulthan	Jose Thomas	Both act as dileeps collegemate
1999	My Dear Karadi	Sandhya Mohan	
1999	Tokyo Nagarathile Viseshangal	Jose Thomas	Udayakrisha acts as TV Anchor
2000	Darling Darling	Rajasenan	
2001	Sundara Purushan	Jose Thomas	
2001	Dhosth	Thulasidas	
2002	Malayalimamanu Vanakkam	Rajasenan	
2002	Snehithan	Jose Thomas	
2003	C.I.D. Moosa	Johny Antony	
2003	Pulival Kalyanam	Shafi	
2004	Runway	Joshiy	
2004	Vettam	Priyadarshan	
2005	Kochi Rajavu	Johny Antony	
2006	Lion	Joshiy	
2006	Kilukkam Kilukilukkam	Sandhya Mohan	
2006	Chess	Raj babu	
2006	Thuruppugulan	Johny Antony	
2007	Inspector Garud	Johny Antony	
2007	July 4	Joshiy	
2008	Magic Lamp	Haridas	
2008	Twenty:20	Joshiy	
2009	Ee Pattanathil Bhootham	Johny Antony	
2010	Pokkiri Raja	Vysakh	
2010	Kaaryasthan	Thomson K. Thomas	
2011	Christian Brothers	Joshiy	
2012	Mayamohini	Jose Thomas	
2012	Mr. Marumakan	Sandhya Mohan	
2013	Kammath & Kammath	Thomson K. Thomas	Udayakrishna and Sibi K. Thomas appear in a song.
2013	Sringaravelan	Jose Thomas	
2014	Avatharam	Joshiy	Produced by Udayakrishna-Sibi K. Thomas
2014	Rajadhi Raja	Ajai Vasudev	
2014	Mylanchi Monchulla Veedu	Benny Thomas	
2015	Ivan Maryadaraman	Suresh Divakar	the last film

=== Udaykrishna (as solo writer) ===
Year	Film	Director	Notes
2016	Pulimurugan	Vysakh	Debut as a solo script writer
2017	Masterpiece	Ajai Vasudev	
2018	Aanakkallan	Suresh Divakar	
2019	Madhura Raja	Vysakh	
2022	Aaraattu	B. Unnikrishnan	
2022	Monster	Vysakh	
2023	Christopher	B. Unnikrishnan	
2023	Bandra	Arun Gopy	
2026	Law and Order	Ranjith	

=== Udaykrishna (as actor) ===
Year	Film	Director	Notes	Ref
1998	Mattupetti Machan	Jose Thomas	Driver Kusulapi	
1999	Udayapuram Sulthan	Jose Thomas	Unnikrishnan's Friend	
1999	Tokyo Nagarathile Viseshangal	Jose Thomas	Media Person	
2012	Mallu Singh	Vysakh	Actor Only	
2017	Ramante Edanthottam	Ranjith Sankar	Actor Only	
2017	Masterpiece	Ajai Vasudev	Cameo appearance as himself	
2020	Shylock	Ajai Vasudev	Actor Only	
2022	Aaraattu	B. Unnikrishnan	Cameo appearance as himself	
