= Kochi Rajavu =

2005 film directed by Johny Antony

- Movie Poster
- Directed by: Johny Antony
- Written by: Udayakrishna; Siby K. Thomas
- Produced by: Amith R. Mohan
- Starring: Dileep; Kavya Madhavan; Rambha; Harisree Ashokan
- Cinematography: Saloo George
- Edited by: Ranjan Abraham
- Music by: Vidhyasagar
- Production company: Amith Productions
- Release date: 14 April 2005 (India)
- Running time: 160 minutes
- Country: India
- Language: Malayalam

Kochi Rajavu (transl. King of Kochi) is a 2005 Indian Malayalam-language action comedy film directed by Johny Antony and written by the Udayakrishna-Siby K. Thomas duo. It stars Dileep in the lead role with Kavya Madhavan, Rambha, Harisree Ashokan, Murali, Jagathy Sreekumar and Vijayaraghavan in supporting roles.

The film marks the second collaboration between Dileep, Johny Antony, Vidyasagar, and the writing duo Udaykrishna–Sibi K. Thomas after C.I.D. Moosa (2003).

== Plot ==
Suryanarayana Varma, known as Unni, is released from prison after five years. He comes from a royal family. Prabhakaran, the powerful head of the Karimparakal family, and his brothers Divakaran and Sudhakaran want revenge against him. Wanting Unni to leave his past behind, Menon, Unni's father and his family shift to Chennai and send him to a law college. Unni's friend, Komalan, resides there as an autowrikshaw driver.

Unni meets Meenakshi, a boyish and independent young woman. Their first meetings are filled with arguments, made worse by Meenakshi's protective brother Siva and his rival Muthu. Surya fractures Muthu for behaving odd with Meenakshi's friend. Initially a naive in the eyes of Meenakshi, Meenakshi discovers that Unni paralysed Muthu and asks him about his identity. Refusing to reveal, she taunts him and gets an electric shock, leading to a misunderstanding between Unni and Siva. After a duel, Siva gets beaten up by Unni. They begin to understand each other, and Meenakshi falls in love with Unni. Her family eventually approaches Unni's family with a marriage proposal.

Unni meets Meenakshi and discloses his past. Five years ago, Aswathy was a medical student from the Karimparakal family. After losing her parents, she lived under the control of her uncles, who wanted her to marry Prakashan, Prabhakaran's eldest son, mainly to protect the family's wealth and inheritance.

Unni first saw Aswathy at a temple and immediately fell in love with her. His only support was Easwara Varma Thirunal, Unni's grandfather, who hailed from a royal family. He repeatedly tried to win her heart, but she rejected him. Unni gets expelled from his house by Menon for not living as per his terms. Later, she told her uncles about Unni and invited him to her house with their approval. Despite Komalan's objection, Unni goes to the house. Instead of a meeting, Unni found himself facing her uncles and Prakashan, who brutally attacked him.

Seeing his suffering, Aswathy began feeling guilty and slowly fell in love with him. With the cover blown, Prabhakaran and brothers strongly opposed their relationship. During a fight, Unni fought Prakashan in self-defence and stabbed him, causing his death. Unni was arrested and sentenced to five years in prison.

In the present, Unni convinves Meenakshi to understand his situation and maintain a distance. His father later told him that Aswathy had married an NRI and gone to the Gulf. Believing this, Unni agreed to marry Meenakshi, after several attempts from Thirunal and Komalan.

On the night before the wedding, Aswathy called Unni and revealed that she had never married and had been waiting for him, being her call a scripted trap by Prabhakaran to bring Unni to Kerala in the plan of ending him. Painfully, Unni calls off his marriage with Meenakshi, after she reluctantly agrees him to leave, breaking in tears. Unni rushed to Kerala, and they decided to elope. Despite the families Meenakshi and Ashwathy chasing them, Thirunal arrives with a group of autowrikshaw drivers they are saved drivers, led by Komalan. Unni and Aswathy finally got married and chose to begin their life together.

== Cast ==
- Dileep as Suryanarayana Varma (Unni)
- Kavya Madhavan as Aswathy (Achu)
- Rambha as Meenakshi Parthasarathy
- Harisree Ashokan as Komalan, Unni's childhood friend and right hand
- Jagathy Sreekumar as Maharaja Sree Moolam Thirunal Easwara Varma Thampuran, Unni's grandfather
- Murali as Chandrashekhara Menon, Unni's father
- Vijayaraghavan as Karimbarakkal Prabhakaran
- Santhosh as Karimbarakkal Divakaran
- Sadiq as Karimbarakkal Sudhakaran
- Irshad as Prakashan, Prabhakaran's eldest son
- Kavi Raj as Lalu, Prabhakaran's youngest son
- Machan Varghese as Brithyan, Kalari Shishyan
- Vijayan as Parthasarathy, Meenakshi's father
- Riyaz Khan as Shiva Parthasarathy
- Mohan Jose as Ambbattur Singam
- Sudheer Sukumaran as 'Maari' Muthu
- Indrans as Mona, Worker of canteen
- Kalaranjini as Lakshmi, Unni's mother
- Thara as Radhika, Unni's Sister
- Vennira Aadai Moorthy as P. R Ananthamurthy, College Principal
- Geetha Salam as Hamsa, an Auto driver
- Nandhu Pothuval as Velayudhan, Auto driver and Unni's left hand
- Delhi Ganesh as Madhavan, Chandrasekhara Menon's friend
- Kalabhavan Haneef as Ayyappan, Auto driver
- Kalabhavan Shajon as Arumugam, Meenakshi's driver
- Ambika Mohan as Bhavani
- Ponnamma Babu as Kunjanamma
- Kavitha Nair as Meenakshi's friend
- Indulekha as Jyothi
- Deepika Mohan as Jyothi's mother
- Abraham Koshy as Meenakshi's uncle who is a minister
- Vaiyapuri as Shiva's friend
- Vysakh as College Student

== Release ==
The film was released on 14 April 2005 coinciding with Vishu. It was released alongside and faced competition from the Prithviraj-starrer Athbhutha Dweepu, the Mohanlal-starrer Chandrolsavam and the Jayaram-starrer Alice in Wonderland. Made on a budget of ₹2.5 crores, Kochi Rajavu was a commercial success. It grossed ₹2.804 crore from three days and ₹4.01 crore in 21 days from 44 screens with a distributor's share of ₹1.73 Crore. It ended its commercial performance with the verdict blockbuster" and thus emerged the year's Vishu winner.

== Music ==
Kochirajavu

Soundtrack album by Vidyasagar
- Released: 2005
- Genre: World Music
- Producer: Vidyasagar

Vidyasagar chronology
| Made in USA (2005) | Kochirajavu (2005) | Alice in Wonderland (2005) |

The soundtrack of Kochi Rajavu was composed by Vidyasagar. He later adapted the song "Munthiri Padam" in Tamil as "Aruviyoda" for the film Pasa Kiligal.

| Song title | Singers |
|---|---|
| "Thanga Kutta Singakutta" | Sujatha Mohan, Annop Shankar |
| "Munthiri Padam" | Udit Narayan, Sujatha Mohan, Premji (Rap vocal) |
| "Moonu Chakra Vandi" | M. G. Sreekumar |
| "Kinavin Kiligale" | Karthik, Manjari |
| "Sooryan Neeyanda" | K. J. Yesudas, Kalyani Nair. Notes: (Raga:Dharmavati) |

Lyrics : Gireesh Puthencherry, R.K Damodharan
