= Johny Antony =

Indian film director and actor

- Born: Changanassery, Kottayam, Kerala, India
- Occupations: Film director; actor
- Years active: 1991–present
- Spouse: Shyni Antony
- Children: 2

Johny Antony is an Indian film director and actor, known for making comedy films in Malayalam cinema. He is from Changanassery in Kottayam district, Kerala. He worked for about a decade as an associate to directors Thulasidas, Taha, Kamal and Jose Thomas. Antony made his directorial debut with the slapstick comedy C.I.D. Moosa in 2003.

His other directorial ventures include Kochi Rajavu (2005), Thuruppu Gulan (2006), Cycle (2008), Ee Pattanathil Bhootham (2009), Masters (2012), Thappana (2012) and Thoppil Joppan (2016). Antony made his acting debut with a role in the film Shikkari Shambhu (2018).

== Career ==
=== Directorial ===
He began his film career as an assistant director and assisted around ten leading directors in Malayalam film. Antony became an independent director in C.I.D. Moosa and became a blockbuster comedy movie. Inspector Garud, with Dileep and Kavya Madhavan in lead roles, followed next.

In 2012, he directed two films, one being Masters, a movie starring Prithviraj, Sasikumar, Pia Bajpai, and Ananya, and the other being Thappana, a movie starring Mammootty, Murali Gopy, Charmy Kaur.

=== Acting ===
Apart from playing some uncredited roles, Johny Antony made his acting debut in the 2018 film Shikkari Shambhu after being persuaded by the film's producer, director Sugeeth and screenwriter Nishad Koya to take up a role. He subsequently appeared in Ranjith's Drama (2018), which featured him in a full-length role. As he continued acting, he was increasingly cast in comic roles. Antony gained wider recognition as an actor for his portrayal of Dr. Bose in Anoop Sathyan's Varane Avashyamund (2020). His acting credits include the films, Joseph (2018), Ganagandharvan (2019), and Home (2021), Hridayam (2022), Pookkaalam (2023), Turbo (2024) and Prince and Family (2025).

== Filmography ==
Key
†	Denotes films that have not yet been released

=== As director ===
Year	Title
2003	CID Moosa
2005	Kochi Rajavu
2006	Thuruppu Gulan
2007	Inspector Garud
2008	Cycle
2009	Ee Pattanathil Bhootham
2012	Thappana
2012	Masters
2014	Bhaiyya Bhaiyya
2016	Thoppil Joppan

=== As assistant director ===
Year	Title	Director
1991	Chanchattam	Thulasidas
1992	Ezhara Ponnana	Thulasidas
1994	Poochakkaru Mani Kettum	Thulasidas
1995	Thirumanassu	Aswathi Gopinath
1995	Manikya Chempazhukka	Thulasidas
1999	Udayapuram Sulthan	Jose Thomas
1999	Panchapandavar	K. K. Haridas
2001	Ee Parakkum Thalika	Thaha
2001	Sundarapurushan	Jose Thomas

=== As actor ===
Year	Title	Role	Notes
1999	Udayapuram Sulthan	Unni's friend	
2001	Ee Parakkum Thalika	Kabuliwalla at police station	
2002	Kunjikoonan	Customer at phone Booth	
2010	Best of Luck	Himself	
2013	Lisammayude Veedu	Himself	
2013	Kadal Kadannu Oru Maathukutty	Himself	
2018	Shikkari Shambhu	Parish Priest	
2018	Drama	Anto	
2018	Thattumpurath Achuthan	Karate Master/ Political party worker	
2018	Joseph	Parish Priest	
2019	Ittymaani: Made in China	Adv.Tharyan Kurian	
2019	Ganagandharvan	Prince	
2019	My Great Grandfather	Saddham Hussain	
2020	Varane Aavashyamundu	Dr. Bose	
2020	Ayyappanum Koshiyum	Himself	
2021	Operation Java	Baburaj	
2021	Home	Suryan	
2021	Sathyam Mathrame Bodhipikkoo	Venu	
2022	Hridayam	Balagopal	
2022	Jo and Jo	Baby Palathara	
2022	Aarattu	Adv. Vettickal Sasi	
2022	Upacharapoorvam Gunda Jayan	Purushan	
2022	Member Rameshan 9aam Ward	Jacob Moonjali	
2022	Pathrosinte Padappukal	Kuriakose	
2022	Meri Awas Suno	R.K.V. Moorthy	
2022	Thirimali	Alexander	
2022	Thallumaala	Abdhulla	
2022	Eesho	Adv. Sebastian Aduppukkunnel	
2022	Monster	Vasavan/Varghese	
2022	Palthu Janwar	Devis	
2023	Momo In Dubai	Hussain	
2023	Oh My Darling	Jose	
2023	Kallanum Bhagavathiyum	Priest	
2023	Pookkaalam	Adv.Narayanan	
2023	Kadina Kadoramee Andakadaham		
2023	Anuragam	Jose	
2023	Neymar	Thomas	
2023	Janaki Jaane	Suku	
2023	Kirkkan	Raja Rajan	
2023	Voice of Sathyanathan	Panchayat President Baby	
2023	Pappachan Olivilanu	Lalappan	
2023	Corona Dhavan	Sathyajith / Karikku Sathya	
2023	Jaladhara Pumpset Since 1962	Advocate Bhattathiri	
2023	Pulimada	Kuttappaappi	
2023	Tholvi F.C.	Kuruvila	
2023	Maharani	Aji and Viji's father	
2023	Cheena Trophy	Pavithran Sakhavu	
2023	Bullet Diaries		
2023	Queen Elizabeth	Varghese Pothan	
2024	Vivekanandan Viralanu	Pappan	
2024	Thundu	Ravi	
2024	Pavi Caretaker	Maathan	
2024	Marivillin Gopurangal	RoRo director	
2024	Turbo	Vakkachan	
2024	Once Upon a Time in Kochi	Jayan	
2024	Nadanna Sambhavam	SI Siby K.J	
2024	Pattapakal		
2024	Idiyan Chandhu	Kunjachan	
2024	Vishesham	Dr. Ganapathy S Adiga	
2024	Super Zindagi	Naji	
2024	Gangs of Sukumarakurup		
2024	Prathibha Tutorials		
2024	Chithini		
2024	Swargam	Vakkchan	
2024	Oru Anweshanathinte Thudakkam	Kuriakose	
2025	ID:The Fake		
2025	Anpodu Kanmani	Dr.Rajeev	
2025	Get-Set Baby	Surendran	
2025	Prince and Family	Krishna Kumar aka KK	
2025	United Kingdom of Kerala	Roychan	
2025	A Pan Indian Story		
2025	Karam	Abdullah	
2025	Khajuraho Dreams	Thomas Pokalakkadan	
2025	Aghosham	Jackson Dominic	
2025	Haal		
2026	Magic Mushrooms	Tony Kurishingal	
2026	Derby		
2026	Law and Order	Ernakulam District Judge	
2026	Avaraachan & Sons	Pavithran	
2026	Maduramee Jeevitham †	TBA	

=== Web series ===
Year	Title	Role	Notes
2024	Jai Mahendran	CM Chandy Kurian	
