= Hakim Rawther =

Indian actor (died 2013)

Hakim Rawther, known mononymously as Hakim, was an Indian actor and film maker in Malayalam cinema. He was known for his directional debut The Guard (2001), which is the world's first film with only a single actor in the cast. He had also acted in supporting roles in several Malayalam movies.

== Biography ==
Hakim was from Kottayam, Kerala. Before entering cinema, he was a mimicry artist. He was one of the first members of Cochin Kalabhavan. He accompanied singer K. J. Yesudas as a session mimicry artist during the period 1979–89. He has been a common face in Jayaraj's films. He has also acted in supporting roles with many other directors. He debuted as a director with The Guard (2001), which was the world's first film with only an actor on screen.

== Personal life ==
Hakim was married to Ghazal writer and singer Devi Menon. The couple did not have any children. He died of cerebral hemorrhage on 5 September 2013 at Kottayam, aged 58.

== Filmography ==
=== As director ===
- The Guard (2001) starring Kalabhavan Mani

=== As actor ===
- Mookkillarajyathu (1991) as Mental hospital patient
- Johnnie Walker (1992) as Drug mafia member
- Paithrukam (1993) as atheistic society member
- Njan Kodiswaran (1994) as Mental hospital patient
- Arabia (film) (1995) as Usthad
- Manthramothiram (1997) as Thief
- Indriyam (2000)
- Thilakkam (2003) as villager
- Pattanathil Sundaran (2003) as Sundaresan's friend
- Vettam (2004) as man at tea shop
- Kaazhcha (2004) as man at film club society
- Rasikan (2004) as Mari, beggar in the street
- Kisan (2006) as Velichapaadu
- Orma Mathram (2011) as man at orphanage
- Naayika (2011) as the camera man
