= The Guard (2001 film) =

2001 film by Hakim Rawther

- Film poster
- Directed by: Hakim
- Screenplay by: Hakim
- Story by: Sabitha Jayaraj
- Produced by: Sabitha Jayaraj; KSFDC
- Starring: Kalabhavan Mani
- Cinematography: Saloo George
- Edited by: Venugopal
- Music by: Biju; Shyam Dharman; Rajesh
- Production company: Green Dragon Movies
- Release date: 12 December 2001
- Country: India
- Language: Malayalam

The Guard is a 2001 Indian Malayalam-language film directed and written by Hakim Rawther. Kalabhavan Mani plays all of the characters.

Yaadein predated The Guard as "the first ‘one-man film’". The film features cinematography by Saloo George, editing by Venugopal and artwork by Nathan Mannoor. The background score has been provided by Biju and songs featured in the film are composed by Shyam Sharman and Rajesh with lyrics written by Arumughan Vengidang. All the songs are sung by Kalabhavan Mani himself.

== Cast ==
- Kalabhavan Mani as Appukkuttan Nair and Thomachan

== Soundtrack ==
The film features 7 songs composed by Shyam Dharman and Rajesh with lyrics penned by Arumughan Vengidang. All the songs are based on folk music and are sung by Kalabhavan Mani himself.

No.	Title	Artist(s)	Length
1.	"Ee Kaattil Puliyundo"	Kalabhavan Mani
2.	"Kaattukurumbathi Karineelakannaale"	Kalabhavan Mani
3.	"Kunjathoone Ponnu Kunjathoone"	Kalabhavan Mani
4.	"Naadodikkaattil"	Kalabhavan Mani
5.	"Thaa Thakkida Nammal Naalalu"	Kalabhavan Mani, Chorus
6.	"Thana Thina Thaanana Dhimi"	Kalabhavan Mani
7.	"Thekkan Malaakhayirangi"	Kalabhavan Mani

== Reception ==
A critic from Screen wrote that "Kalabhavan Mani, who is the only actor on screen, does his part as Appukuttan very well. Director Hakkim, who has done the script based on story by Sathitha Jayaraj, has taken care to give a new dimension to the seemingly simple story of Appukuttan". A critic from Sify wrote that "The director Hakim has given it an interesting treatment not seen in regular films". A critic from Cinesouth wrote that "Good one to watch. Especially if you're a passionate fighter for animal rights".
