= Baiju Ezhupunna =

Indian Malayalam actor and director

- Born: 1 March 1971; Alappuzha, Kerala, India
- Other names: Ezhupunna Baiju, Baiju Johnson
- Occupations: Actor; Director
- Years active: 1991-present

Baiju Ezhupunna is an Indian actor and film producer who works in Malayalam-language films. Baiju has worked in films such as Udayapuram Sulthan and Aaraattu.

== Filmography ==
=== As actor ===
Year	Title	Role	Notes
1991	Irikku M.D. Akathundu		
1992	First Bell		
1992	Welcome to Kodaikanal		
1995	Boxer		
1997	Ancharakkalyaanam		
1997	Hitler Brothers	Chinna Thambi	
1997	Vamsam	Sunnychan	
1998	Manthri Kochamma		
1998	Meenakshi Kalyanam		
1998	Kalaapam		
1998	Achaammakkuttiyude Achaayan	Kozhipalli Peter	
1999	Pathram		
1999	Tokyo Nagarathile Viseshangal	Irumbukai Mathachan	
1999	My Dear Karady	Rozario	
1999	Auto Brothers		
1999	Friends	Goonda	
1999	Ezhupunna Tharakan	Sathyanathan	
1999	Udayapuram Sulthan	Marthandan	
1999	James Bond	Kidnaper	
2001	Magic Lamp	Chenkeeri Dhada	
2002	Jameendaar		
2004	Vellinakshatram	SI Sugunan	
2004	Sathyam		
2005	Ben Johnson	Thrivikraman	
2005	Pandippada	Gounder	
2005	Udayon	Lorry Driver Mathai	
2005	Thommanum Makkalum	S.I. Thankaraj	
2005	Nerariyan CBI		
2006	Kilukkam Kilukilukkam		
2006	Rashtram	Stephen	
2006	Pachakuthira		
2006	Thuruppu Gulan	Rajan	
2006	Keerthi Chakra	NSG Commando Siddharthan	
2009	Evidam Swargamanu	Joseph	
2010	Pokkiri Raja	Chandru	
2010	Oridathoru Postman	Bhairavan	
2011	Traffic	Thanzeer	
2011	Velayudham	Briefcase Bomber	Tamil film
2012	Friday 11.11.11 Alappuzha		
2013	Chewing Gum	Sivan	
2013	Blackberry		
2013	KQ		Also director
2015	Salt Mango Tree	Charlie	
2016	School Bus	Jabbar	
2016	Kolamass		
2016	Shajahanum Pareekuttiyum	Tony	
2016	Inspector Dawood Ibrahim	Bank Manager Thomas	
2017	Basheerinte Premalekhanam		
2018	Oru Pazhaya Bomb Kadha	Chekkutty	
2018	Diary Milk		
2018	Kaly	Himself	
2019	Kumbalangi Nights	Baby's Uncle Tony	
2019	Madhura Raja	Chandru	
2019	Manoharam	Sudhi	
2019	Ganagandharvan	Moorthi	
2019	Oru Kadath Naadan Katha		
2019	Mamangam	Konthi Nair	
2020	Varkey		
2021	Anjam Vedam		
2021	Yuvam	Sabu Vattappara	
2022	Aaraattu	Chandradas / NIA Officer	
2022	Upacharapoorvam Gunda Jayan	Solomon	
2022	Visudha Mejo	Chacko	
2022	Pathonpatham Noottandu		
2022	My Name is Azhagan		
2023	Enthada Saji	Puthenpurayil Kunjukunju	
2024	Vishesham		
2026	Koodothram		Also director
