= Dhosth (2001 Malayalam film) =

2001 film by Thulasidas

- Poster
- Directed by: Thulasidas
- Written by: Udaykrishna; Siby K. Thomas
- Based on: Kannedhirey Thondrinal (Tamil)
- Starring: Kunchacko Boban; Dileep; Kavya Madhavan; Jagathy Sreekumar; Kalabhavan Mani
- Cinematography: Saloo George
- Edited by: Ranjan Abraham
- Music by: Score: S.P. Venkatesh; Songs: Vidyasagar
- Production company: Kottarakkara Films
- Release date: 16 August 2001
- Running time: 140 minutes
- Country: India
- Language: Malayalam

Dhosth (transl. Friend) is a 2001 Indian Malayalam-language romantic comedy action film directed by Thulasidas. Kunchacko Boban and Dileep share the title roles along with Kavya Madhavan, Jagathy Sreekumar, Kalabhavan Mani and Shiju in supporting roles, with Jayasurya making a cameo appearance. It is a remake of the Tamil film Kannedhirey Thondrinal (1998). The film was a box office success.

== Plot ==
Vijay, a rich guy, meets a girl Geethu in the Coimbatore railway station while travelling to Chennai to enroll in an engineering college. It is love at first sight for Vijay. Ajith also studies in the same college where Vijay joins and initially both Vijay and Ajith get off on the wrong foot. Geethu is Ajith's sister and without knowing that Vijay conveys his love to her but Geethu ignores him and keeps a distance from him.

One day, Vijay saves Ajith's life from a few thugs. After this, they put their differences aside, and become very close friends. On one occasion, Ajith's mother insults Vijay when he comes over and upset, he leaves. In due course, his mother learns about Vijay's good character and becomes very affectionate towards him. Geethu starts to appreciate him and discovers she loves him too.

Before Vijay and Geethu can announce their love to their families, Ajith informs him about a problem that had occurred in his family a few years ago. Ajith has one more sister, who he had never mentioned before. She had eloped with his then close friend on the day of her marriage which left Ajith and his mother broken-hearted. They disowned her, and have not spoken to her since. He sees his then-friend's behavior as a traitorous act.

Now Vijay feels bad about his love towards Geethu and decides not to go ahead with the relationship, fearing that Ajith would interpret it as another betrayal. He sacrifices his love for his friendship with Ajith. Geethu however is unwilling to break off the relationship, and requests him to accept her love on many occasions, to no avail. Her family arranges for her wedding, and desperate, she consumes poison and is taken to the hospital. Vijay rushes to hospital along with his friend where all is revealed. Ajith is proud of his friend and agrees to Vijay and Geethu's marriage.

== Cast ==
- Kunchacko Boban as Vijay
- Dileep as Ajith
- Kavya Madhavan as Geethu, Ajith's sister
- Jagathy Sreekumar as Ettuveettil Kuttappan
- Kalabhavan Mani as V. Jayan
- Shiju as Shankar, Ajith's brother in law
- Anju Aravind as Devika, Ajith's youngest sister
- Shruthi Raj as Chinju
- Bindu Panicker as Latha, Kuttappan's Wife
- Ravi Vallathol as Mukundan, Ajith's Devika's and Geethu's Father
- Urmila Unni as Lathika, Ajith's Devika's and Geethu's Mother
- Baburaj as Alex Britto
- Subair as Sub Inspector Stephen
- Jose Pellissery as Hari Menon, Chinju's Father
- Babu Swamy as Govindan Kurup, College Principal
- Kanakalatha as College Professor latha
- Nadirsha as Ajith's Friend
- Harisree Yousuf as Ajith's Friend
- Eloor George as Ajith's Friend
- Karyavattam Sasikumar as Krishnamenon, Vijay's Father
- Aneesh Ravi as Koshy, Ajith's College Mate
- Jayasurya as College Student, Ajith's rival

== Production ==
The film was shot in Ernakulam and nearby places. The campus scenes were shot at Christ College, Irinjalakuda.

== Soundtrack ==
Music: Vidyasagar, lyrics: S. Ramesan Nair.

Song title	Singers	Raga(s)
"Dosth"	S. P. Balasubrahmanyam, Biju Narayanan	
"Maari Praave"	Malgudi Subha, Balabhaskar	
"Manju Pole"	Srinivas	
"Kilipenne" (male)	K. J. Yesudas	Kapi
"Kilipenne" (female)	K. S. Chithra	Kapi
"Kilippenne" (duet)	K. J. Yesudas, K. S. Chithra	Kapi
"Thathamma peru"	Sujatha Mohan, K. J. Yesudas	

== Reception ==
A critic from keralatalkies.com wrote that "Dosth maintains the traditional superhit outlines of the movies Friends and Niram. Though the young scriptwriter duo of Sibi K Thomas and Udayakrishanan maintain that these resemblances are mere coincidences, the resemblance is too striking to be passed off as commonplace errors". A critic from indiainfo.com wrote that "Among the cast it is Dileep who steals the show as Ajith. Dileep seems very much different in the semi-serious role. Kunchacko Boban as Vijay and Kavya Madhavan as Geethu are very much likely to appeal the youth". A critic from Sify wrote, "Dileep in his new avtaar as a serious, tough guy Ajith is totally different from his early film Tenkasipattanam, where he could make the audience laugh to death. He has changed his looks and has come out with an excellent performance. Kunchakko Boban as Vijay, after a long time had a scope to act after he was doing all chocolate hero roles".
