= Mr. Marumakan =

- Theatrical poster
- Directed by: Sandhya Mohan
- Written by: Udayakrishna; Siby K. Thomas
- Based on: Attaku Yamudu Ammayiki Mogudu by Satyanand
- Produced by: Maha Subair; Nelson Ipe
- Starring: Dileep; Sanusha
- Cinematography: P. Sukumar
- Edited by: Mahesh Narayanan
- Music by: Suresh Peters
- Production company: Varnachitra Big Screen
- Distributed by: Varnachitra; Vysakha Cinema; Aan Mega Media
- Release date: 18 August 2012
- Running time: 177 minutes
- Country: India
- Language: Malayalam

Mr. Marumakan (transl. Mr. Son-in-law) is a 2012 Malayalam-language action comedy film written by the duo Udayakrishna-Siby K. Thomas and directed by Sandhya Mohan. The movie stars Dileep in the title role with alongside Sanusha, K. Bhagyaraj (in his Malayalam debut), Biju Menon, Khushbu Sundar and Sheela. Upon release, the film received positive reviews, and the film was commercial success.

The film is a remake of the 1989 Telugu film Attaku Yamudu Ammayiki Mogudu. Some scenes of the film is borrowed from another Malayalam film Oru Penninte Kadha (1971). The film tells the story of three rich arrogant women, Raja Kokila, her adopted daughter Raja Mallika and her daughter Raja Lakshmi who believe that a woman can rule without the help of a man. However, the entry of a lawyer named Ashok Raj into their lives forces them to revise their opinions.

== Plot ==
The movie is about three wealthy arrogant women Raja Kokila, Raja Mallika and Raja Lakshmi, who all believes that a woman can survive without a husband.

Their thoughts are changed when a charismatic lawyer named Ashok Chakravarthy marries Raja Lakshmi. Into his life, also enters a banker named Balasubramanyam, his father Raja Gopalan Thampi's childhood friend, Lakshmi's father and Mallika's husband. The three women's business entity is known as Raja's Groups of company, where Kokila is the chairperson. His entry into their family was to unite Balasubrahmanyam and Mallika, who were separated. After a bunch of failed attempts, he finally reveals that Mallika is not Kokila's daughter and she was adopted when she was minor. He reveals that after the death of Kokila's husband Raja Venkateshwara Chettiyar, a cruel, ruthless businessman and a womaniser, she became the sole owner of Chettiyar's assets and changed her name from Raja Kokila. It is also revealed that Mallika's mother was their maid Bhavaniyamma. Mallika and Balasubrahmanyam got separated due to Kokila's love and possessiveness towards Mallika and Kokila thought that all the husbands have Chettiyar's cruel behaviour and that made them to get separated. The movie ends with the reunion of Raja Mallika with both her husband and mother.

== Cast ==
- Dileep as Adv. Ambalakkara Ashok Raj (Ashok Chakravarthy)
- Sanusha as Raja Lakshmi, Ashok Raj's childhood friend turned wife and Mallika's and Balasubrahmanyam's daughter (voice by Nithuna Nevil)
- K. Bhagyaraj as Palakattu Balasubrahmanyam, Lakshmi's father and Mallika's husband
- Biju Menon as Ambalakkara Babu Raj, Ashok Raj's elder brother and Rajagopalan Thampi's elder son
- Khushbu Sundar as Raja Mallika, Lakshmi's mother and Balasubrahmanyam's wife (Voice by Bhagyalakshmi)
- Sheela as Raja Kokila, Mallika's adopted mother and Chairperson of Raja's Group
- Kaviyoor Ponnamma as Bhavani Amma, Mallika's birth mother
- Nedumudi Venu as Ambalakkara Rajagopalan Thampi, Ashok's, Babu's and Rohini's father
- Suraj Venjaramoodu as Chantha Hamsa
- Salim Kumar as Shankaranunni, Ashok Raj's childhood friend and left-hand man
- Harisree Ashokan as Keshu, Mallika's former assist and Ashok Raj's right-hand man
- Sai Kumar as Ramachandran, Ashok Raj's instructor and Madhuram's father
- Riyaz Khan as ACP Madhuram Ramachandran IPS, Ramachandran's son and Ashok Raj's childhood friend
- Baburaj as Adv. V.K. Panickar, Raja Mallika's legal advisor
- Meghna Nair as Minmini, Mallika's PA
- Mallika as Rohini, Ashok's sister
- Sajitha Betti as Bhavana, Panicker's sister
- Lakshmipriya as Panicker's wife
- Thesni Khan as Raja Mallika's assistant; Keshu's wife
- Ambika Mohan as Ambika, Raja Gopalan Thampi's wife and Rohini's and Ashok Raj's and Baburaj's mother
- Kazan Khan as Raja Venkateshwara Chettiyar, Kokila's husband (video archive)

== Awards ==
Ceremony	Category	Nominee	Result	Ref.
2nd South Indian International Movie Awards	SIIMA Award for Best Comedian	Suraj Venjaramoodu	Won	
