= Aanakkallan =

2018 Malayalam-language film

- Theatrical release poster
- Directed by: Suresh Divakar
- Screenplay by: Udaykrishna
- Produced by: Saptha Tarang Cinema
- Starring: Biju Menon Siddique Suresh Krishna Bala Suraj Venjaramoodu Anusree Sarayu Shamna Kasim Dharmajan Bolgatty Hareesh Kanaran
- Cinematography: Alby Antony
- Edited by: Johnkutty
- Music by: Songs: Nadirshah; Background Score: Bijibal
- Production company: Saptha Tarang Cinema
- Distributed by: Saptha Tarang Cinema
- Release date: 18 October 2018
- Running time: 155 minutes
- Country: India
- Language: Malayalam

Aanakkallan is a 2018 Indian Malayalam-language comedy thriller film directed by Suresh Divakar and written by Udaykrishna. The film stars Biju Menon, Siddique and Anusree in the leading roles. It was produced under the banner of Saptha Tarang Cinema.

== Plot ==
Esthappan is a DYSP, who has married Nancy from a wealthy household, without the approval of her parents. He is assigned with the duty of finding the mystery behind a skeleton which was found from Ananthapuram Palace.

Pavithran, a thief claims he knows the identity of the murderer. Nancy's house is near the palace, so he sees this as an opportunity to mend his relationship with the family and solve the case with the help of Pavithran. They together attempt to figure out the identity of the murderer.

Past: Neelima is a banker and is married to Pavithran. Anirudhan, Pavithran's childhood friend and Suryanarayanan, a rich builder, who is Anirudhan's relative convince Pavithran to start a catering unit which would yields huge profits within a year. The catering unit would have 3 partners - Anirudhan, Pavithran and Suryanarayanan and each partner needs to invest money. Pavithran mortgages his land and house to raise the money. Suryanarayanan and Anirudhan inform Pavithran that there is a shortage of ₹30 lakhs which would take a week to arrange and they may lose the business deal. Neelima places fake gold at the bank and hands over ₹30 lakhs to her husband and Anirudhan on the assurance that ₹30 lakhs would be returned within a week to the bank. Both Anirudhan and Suryanarayanan cheat Pavithran and abscond with the money. Unable to with stand the criticism, Neelima who was 6 months pregnant commits suicide, by hanging.

Present: Pavithran realises the truth and decides to avenge Neelima's death. When he confronts Anirudhan, it turns to a fight. When Anirudhan tries to kill Pavithran with a rebar, he falls to his death. Pavithran hides his body in the palace along with Kallan Ramu, who witnessed the murder. The skeleton found from Ananthapuram Palace was Anirudhan's. Finally, Pavithran killing Suryanarayanan and Pavithran surrenders to Esthappan.

== Cast ==
- Biju Menon as Pavithran/Chackochi
- Siddique as DYSP Aana Esthappan
- Suresh Krishna as CI "Bruce Lee" Rajan
- Bala as Suryanarayanan
- Suraj Venjaramoodu as "Kallan" Ramu
- Anusree as Neelima, Pavithran's wife
- Sarayu as Nancy, Esthappan's wife
- Shamna Kasim as Rosy Thomas
- Hareesh Kanaran as Eesho
- Sudheer Karamana as "Goonda" Korah
- Dharmajan Bolgatty as Darmaputran
- Indrans as Balachandran Nair, Pavithran's uncle
- Bindu Panicker as Thresyakutty, Thomas's wife
- Sai Kumar as Paraykal Thomas
- Chembil Ashokan as Achutha Kurup
- Kailash as Anirudhan, the secondary antagonist and Suryanarayanan's cousin
- Anil Murali as SI Govindan
- Priyanka as Suzy
- Shivaji Guruvayoor as DGP Devarajan IPS
- G. Suresh Kumar as C.P Ramachandran, Chief minister of Kerala
- Edavela Babu as Mathukutty

== Music ==
The music for the film is composed by Nadirsha and Bijibal. Lyrics were by Rajeev Alunkal and Harinarayanan.

== Release ==
Aanakkallan released on 18 October 2018.

== Reception ==
The Times of India gave the film a rating of 3.0/5 and Mathrubhumi gave the film a rating of 3.5/5.
