= City Police (film) =

- Film poster
- Directed by: Venu B Nair
- Written by: Kaloor Dennis
- Screenplay by: Kaloor Dennis
- Produced by: Palamuttam Majeed
- Starring: Suresh Gopi; Kakka Ravi; Geetha; Sukumari; P. C. George
- Cinematography: Saloo George
- Edited by: K. Sankunni
- Music by: S. P. Venkatesh
- Production company: Kaseeba Productions
- Distributed by: Kaseeba Productions
- Release date: 1993
- Country: India
- Language: Malayalam

City Police is a 1993 Indian Malayalam film, directed by Venu B Nair and produced by Palamuttam Majeed. The film stars Suresh Gopi, Kakka Ravi, Geetha, Sukumari and P. C. George in the lead roles. The film has musical score by S. P. Venkatesh.

== Plot ==
Arun Kumar's sister is abused and killed by a son of a political leader. When another political leader faces troubles with the other one, he makes arrangements to set free Arun, who was jailed using false evidence. Arun goes on a killing spree with Inspector Sajan on his tail.

== Cast ==
- Suresh Gopi as Arun Kumar
- Kakka Ravi as Sajan Mathew
- Geetha as Dr Jessy
- Sukumari as Sajan Mathew's mother
- P. C. George
- Mahesh as Jayan
- Prathapachandran as DIG
- Geetha Vijayan as Maya
- Jagannatha Varma
- KPAC Sunny
- Mala Aravindan
- Narayanankutty as Narayanankutty
- T. S. Krishnan as Nandu
- Neena Kurup

== Soundtrack ==
The music was composed by S. P. Venkatesh.

No.	Song	Singers	Lyrics	Length (m:ss)
1	"Ennolam Sundariyaarundu"	Minmini	Kaithapram	
