= Amma Ammaayiyamma =

- VCD cover
- Directed by: Sandhya Mohan
- Written by: Udaykrishna; Sibi K. Thomas
- Screenplay by: Sibi K.Thomas
- Produced by: Somasekharan
- Starring: Mukesh; Sukanya; Harisree Ashokan; Kaviyoor Ponnamma; Sukumari; Meera
- Cinematography: Vijayakumar
- Edited by: K. Rajagopal
- Music by: Songs: M. S. Viswanathan; Score: S. P. Venkatesh
- Production company: Classic Cine Vision
- Release date: 26 March 1998
- Country: India
- Language: Malayalam

Amma Ammaayiyamma (transl. Mother, mother-in-law)അമ്മ അമ്മായിയമ്മ is a 1998 Indian Malayalam-language film directed by Sandhya Mohan and produced by Somasekharan. The film stars Mukesh, Sukanya, Harisree Ashokan, Kaviyoor Ponnamma, Sukumari and Meera in the lead roles. The film has its musical score composed by S. P. Venkatesh and original songs by M. S. Viswanathan. movie was hit at box office.

== Plot ==
Saratha, a retired teacher, has five children, Prabhavati, Premachandran, Madhavi, Maya and Balachandran. Madhavi is married to Bharghavan and they have a child. But Madhavi and Narayaniamma (Bhargavan's mother) always makes some small issues each other. Balachandran is a bachelor and doesn't have a job. Prabhavati marries Shekharankutty, a rich businessman and forgets her family relations. However, Shekharankutty decides to make her realize the importance of family relationships. On the other hand, Premachandran marries Renuka, a rich woman. She makes nuisance in his family by her mother's order and made Prem out of the family. Maya marries Reghu. But Maya is very hurt by her mother-in-law upon dowry. Can anyone solve these problems?

== Cast ==
- Mukesh as Shekharankutty / Shekharan
- Sukanya as Prabhavathy / Prabha, Shekharankutty's Wife
- Harishree Ashokan as Premachandran, Prabhavathy, Balachandran and Maya's Elder Brother and Madhavi's Younger Brother
- Kaviyoor Ponnamma as Sarada Teacher, Premachandran, Prabhavathy, Balachandran, Maya and Madhavi's Mother and Shekharankutty's Mother-in-Law
- Sukumari as Vishalakshi / Vishalam, Premachandran's Mother-in-Law
- Meera as Maya, Prabhavathy's Younger Sister
- Krishna Prasad as Balachandran, Prabhavathy's Younger Brother
- Innocent as Bhargavan, Sarada Teacher's Son-in-Law
- Priyanka Anoop as Madhavi, Prabhavathy's Elder Sister and Bhargavan's Wife
- Vijayakumar as Raghu, Maya's Husband and Sarada Teacher's Son-in-Law
- Kanya Bharathi as Renuka / Renu, Premachandran's Wife and Vishalakshi's Daughter
- K. T. S. Padannayil as Sarada's Father and Premachandran, Prabhavathy, Balachandran, Maya and Madhavi's Grandfather
- Jose Pellissery as Sanku, Vishalakshi's Husband
- N. F. Varghese as Kaimal, Shekharankutty's Friend
- T. S. Raju as Raghu's Father
- Tony as Mohan, Vishalakshi's Son and Premachandran's Brother-in-Law
- Gayathri as Rekha, Mohan's Wife and Vishalakshi's Daughter-in-Law
- K. P. A. C. Lalitha as Shekarankutty's Aunt (Cameo)
- Philomina as Narayaniyamma, Bhargavan's Mother and Madhavi's Mother-in-Law
- Usharani as Dhakshayaniyamma, Raghu's Mother and Maya's Mother-in-Law
- Anju as Sulochana, Raghu's Ex-Fiancee (Cameo)
- Kalamandalam Chinnu as Doctor (Gynaecologist)
- Kalabhavan Navas as Sharath

== Music ==
The original songs were composed by M. S. Viswanathan while the film score was composed by S. P. Venkatesh. The audio cassette had the 5 original songs featured in the film.

No.	Song	Singers	Length (m:ss)
1	"Mele Ponveyil"	M. G. Sreekumar, Sangeetha	
2	"Mele Ponveyil"	M. G. Sreekumar	
3	"Amma Amma Ammayiamma Jayichatharu thottatharu"	M. G. Sreekumar, M. S. Viswanathan	
4	"Velicham Vilakkine"	P. Jayachandran	
5	"Velicham Vilakkine"	Arundhathi	
