= Sundara Purushan (2001 film) =

2001 film by Jose Thomas

- Directed by: Jose Thomas
- Written by: Udayakrishna-Siby K. Thomas
- Produced by: Baiju Ezhupunna
- Starring: Suresh Gopi; Mukesh; Devayani; Nandini
- Cinematography: Saloo George
- Edited by: Bhoominathan
- Music by: Songs- Mohan Sithara Background Score- C Rajamani
- Release date: 12 October 2001
- Country: India
- Language: Malayalam

Sundara Purushan (transl. Handsome man) is a 2001 Indian Malayalam-language comedy-drama film directed by Jose Thomas and written by Udayakrishna-Siby K. Thomas. It is an adaptation of the 1994 Telugu film Subhalagnam. The film stars Suresh Gopi, Mukesh, Devayani, and Nandini.

== Plot ==
The story is about Suryanaranan who is a musician and is not-well-to-do. One day, he gets a job at a mental hospital and the owner, Jyothika agrees to give him a high pay. But she becomes violent when Surya refuses to sing. Then, Gevargesese, the doctor at the hospital reveals that she is mentally ill.

As part of the treatment Surya decides to act as he loves Jyothika. Upon hearing that he is rejected payment by the doctor, Surya runs away to his hometown to see his wife, and daughter.. After a few days, Jyotika's father Ramachandra Menon and the doctor visit Suryanarayanan and explains that Jyotika has become violent when her father refuses to allow them to marry. They need Surya to marry Jyotika so that she can be treated further.

Initially, he is hesitant but Jyotika's father convinces his wife Sridevi by rewarding her wealth as much as they wanted. They couldn't resist the offer and Surya agreed to 'act' to marry Jyotika. Surya thinking the marriage ceremony is fake, marries Jyothika but her father has arranged for a real marriage to take place. Overcome by wealth Sreedevi forgets her duties as a mother which angers Surya and he slaps her. She vows to take revenge. Later Surya gets a divorce petition sent to him. Surya agrees to go to Austria with Jyothika.

When the divorce letter arrives at sreedevi's house she realises she can't live without Surya and goes to see him. Menon reveals to Sreedevi that she had signed the divorce petition herself when he asked her to sign some papers after her receiving a large amount of cash she had blackmailed him into giving. Sreedevi pleads with the doctor for help and he goes to see Menon but Menon tells him that all he wants is his daughter's good health. At the airport, Jyothika learns everything and out of this shock, returns to a normal mental state.

== Cast ==
- Suresh Gopi as Surya Narayanan / Suryan
- Mukesh as Dr. Geevarghese
- Nandini as Sreedevi, Suryan's Wife
- Devayani as Jyothika Menon
- N. F. Varghese as Ramachandra Menon, Jyothika's father
- Harishree Ashokan as Philipose
- Oduvil Unnikrishnan as Aravindan, Surya's Father
- Baby Manjima Mohan as Daughter of Surya Narayanan and Sreedevi
- Cochin Haneefa as Allawoodheen
- M. S. Thripunithura as Kannappan, Menon's Advocate
- Kottayam Nazeer
- Salim Kumar as Balan
- Geetha Salam

== Soundtrack ==
The film features original soundtrack composed by Mohan Sithara for the lyrics by Kaithapram

- Bhoochakravalangalil - KJ Yesudas, Chorus
- Konchedi - Swarnalatha
- Konchedi konchum - Afsal
- Thankamanassin (D) - KJ Yesudas, Radhika Thilak
- Thankamanassin (M) - KJ Yesudas
- Thodunnathu - KJ Yesudas, Mohan Sithara, Smitha
- Thurakkaatha ponvaathil - KS Chithra
