= Achaammakkuttiyude Achaayan =

- Directed by: Rajan P. Dev
- Written by: Benny P. Nayarambalam
- Screenplay by: Benny P. Nayarambalam
- Produced by: Ajith; Benoy; Rajan P. Dev
- Starring: Rajan P. Dev; Srividya; Jagadish; Kalabhavan Mani; Jagathy Sreekumar
- Cinematography: Saloo George
- Edited by: G. Murali
- Music by: Kalvoor Balan; Rajamani (BGM)
- Production company: ABR Productions
- Distributed by: ABR Release
- Release date: 1998
- Country: India
- Language: Malayalam

Achaammakkuttiyude Achaayan is a 1998 Indian Malayalam film, directed by Rajan P. Dev and starring Rajan P. Dev and Srividya in the lead roles.

== Cast ==
- Rajan P. Dev as Kattungal Anthony
- Srividya as Achamma Anthony
- Jagadish as Kattungal Johnny
- Chippy as Mareena
- Kalabhavan Mani as Sunnichen
- N. F. Varghese as Kozhipalli Avarachan
- Jagathy Sreekumar as Lawrence
- Reena as Alice Lawrence
- Devan as Dr. John Zacharia
- Philomina as Ammachi
- Kuthiravattam Pappu as Kattapana Kuttappan
- Machan Varghese as Kuttappan's Brother
- Baiju Ezhupunna as Kozhipalli Peter
- Tony as Kozhipalli Paulachen
- Ramya Sudha

== Awards ==
- Kerala State Film Award for Best Dubbing Artist – Sreeja for Chippy
