= My Dear Karadi =

- VCD cover
- Directed by: Sandhya Mohan
- Written by: Udayakrishna; Siby K. Thomas
- Produced by: Gopikrishna; Vinu Kiriyeth
- Starring: Kalabhavan Mani; Jagathy Sreekumar; Premkumar
- Cinematography: Anil Nair
- Edited by: K. Rajagopal
- Music by: C.Thankaraj; Film score: S. P. Venkatesh
- Production company: Gopurachithra
- Distributed by: Gopurachithra
- Release date: 1999
- Country: India
- Language: Malayalam

My Dear Karadi (English: My Dear Bear) is a 1999 Malayalam comedy drama film written by the duo Udayakrishna-Siby K. Thomas and directed by Sandhya Mohan with Kalabhavan Mani in the lead role. Kalabhavan Shajohn appears as a bear for much of the film. The film was remade in Malay as Cinta Beruang (2012) by Rama Narayanan. The film also reuses scenes from the film Mrugaya.

== Plot ==
Manikandan is a zoo-keeper. A bear accidentally escapes from the zoo, for which Manikandan is held responsible. He would lose his job if the bear is not found, and unemployment would considerably damage the prospect of his getting married with the girl he loves. The movie is all about how Manikantan dresses up as a bear to secure his job and marry his girlfriend.

== Cast ==
- Kalabhavan Mani as Manikandan
- Jagathi Sreekumar as Zoo Vasu, Manikandan's best friend
- Premkumar as Tarzan Kittunni, Varunni's younger brother
- Baiju as Rajappan
- Captain Raju as SI Keshavan (Karadi Keshavan)
- Salim Kumar as Head Constable Ujwallan
- Anitha Nair as Anju Keshavan
- A. C. Zainuddin as Peethambaran, zoo supervisor
- Kalabhavan Navas as Appukkuttan
- Kottayam Nazir as Philippose
- Salu Kuttanadu as Sundaran Arpookkara
- Meena Ganesh as Manikandan's mother
- Santhosh as Sathyanathan
- Baiju Ezhupunna as Rozario
- Maniyanpilla Raju as Nelson Fernandez
- Kalabhavan Shajohn in dual role as :
  - Rangan
  - Body double for Kalabhavan Mani in bear costume
- M G Sreekumar as school teacher (cameo appearance)
- K. T. S. Padannayil as grandfather of Anju
- Madhavi Chandran
- Mammootty as Varunni (as flashback from the movie, Mrigaya)
