= Saloo George =

Indian cinematographer

Saloo George is an Indian cinematographer in Malayalam cinema.

== Career ==
Saalu George graduated in cinematography from Adyar Film Institute, Chennai, Tamil Nadu .

== Personal life ==
Saalu George is married to Rekha George, children Joseph George, Abraham George, Cherian George.

== Partial filmography ==
=== As cinematographer ===
- Banking Hours 10 to 4 (2012)
- The Filmstaar (2011)
- Aazhakadal (2011)
- Sarkar Colony (2011)
- Utharaswayamvaram (2009)
- Bharya Onnu Makkal Moonnu (2009)
- Colours (2009)
- Kangaroo (2007)
- Kaakki (2007)
- Bada Dosth (2006)
- Kisan (2006)
- Kilukkam Kilukilukkam (2006)
- Nerariyan CBI (2005)
- Ullam (2005)
- December (2005)
- Pandippada (2005)
- Kochi Rajavu (2005)
- Sethurama Iyer CBI (2004)
- Sasneham Sumithra (2004)
- Chathikkatha Chanthu (2004)
- C.I.D. Moosa (2003)
- Kuberan (2002)
- Snehithan (2002)
- Kunjikoonan (2002)
- Sundara Purushan (2001)
- Ee Parakkum Thalika (2001)
- The Guard (2001)
- Dhosth (2001)
- Nagaravadhu (2001)
- Mimics 2000 (2000)
- Thenkasipattanam (2000)
- Sathyameva Jayathe (2001)
- Daivathinte Makan (2000)
- Mark Antony (2000)
- Thachiledathu Chundan (1999)
- Aalibabayum Aarara Kallanmarum (1998)
- Achaammakkuttiyude Achaayan (1998)
- Janathipathyam (1997)
- Masmaram (1997)
- Aayiram Naavulla Ananthan (1996)
- Manthrika Kuthira (1996)
- Swarna Kireedam (1996)
- Maanthrikam (1995)
- Mangalyasootram (1995)
- Kusruthikaatu (1995)
- Bharya (1994)
- Pradakshinam (1994)
- Kambolam (1994)
- Dollar (1994)
- Varaphalam (1994)
- Thalamura (1993)
- City Police (1997)
- Kaazhchakkappuram (1992)
- Poochakkaru Mani Kettum (1992)
- Champakulam Thachan (1992)
- Ennodu Ishtam Koodamo (1992)
- Ezhara Ponnana (1992)
- Oru Kochu Bhoomikulukkam (1992)
- Kasarkode Khaderbai (1992)
- Aayushkalam (1992)
- Cheppukilukkana Changathi (1991)
- Ulladakkam (1991)
- Mimics Parade (1991)
- Vishnulokam (1991)
- Sandhwanam (1991)
- Nettippattam (1991)
- Pavam Pavam Rajakumaran (1990)
- Thoovalsparsham (1990)
- Saandhram (1990)
- Shubhayathra (1990)
- Pradeshika Varthakal (1989)
- Varnam (1989)
- Paadha Mudra (1988)
- Thaniyavarthanam (1987)
- Ambadi Thannilorunni (1986)
- Nulli Novikkathe (1985)
- Jalarekha (1981)
