= Udayapuram Sulthan =

1999 film directed by Jose Thomas

- VCD cover
- Directed by: Jose Thomas
- Screenplay by: Udayakrishna; Siby K. Thomas
- Story by: Jose Thomas
- Produced by: P. M. P. Rawther; Hari; Shahulhameed; Krishnakumar
- Starring: Dileep; Narendra Prasad; Preetha; Captain Raju; Shruthi Raj
- Cinematography: Uthpal V. Nayanar
- Edited by: K. Rajagopal
- Music by: Kaithapram; C.Rajamani (Background Score)
- Production company: Global Visual Media
- Distributed by: Vismaya Films; Global Release; Dinesh Panicker
- Release date: 19 November 1999
- Running time: 160 minutes
- Country: India
- Language: Malayalam

Udayapuram Sulthan (transl. Sultan of Udayapuram) is a 1999 Indian Malayalam-language musical comedy-thriller film directed by Jose Thomas and written by Udayakrishna-Siby K. Thomas. It stars Dileep, Narendra Prasad, Preetha Vijaykumar, Shruthi Raj, Captain Raju, Innocent, Cochin Hanifa, Jagathy Sreekumar, Harisree Ashokan, Ambika, Sudheesh, Salim Kumar, Sphadikam George, Kottayam Nazir, and Oduvil Unnikrishnan.

The film commercial success in box office and was remade in Telugu as Denikaina Ready, in Bengali as Khiladi, and in Odia as Sundergarh Ra Salman Khan.

== Plot ==
Avittam Thirunal Narayana Varma, the scion of the Udayapuram royal family has a daughter named Malavika Thampuratti, who walks out of the palace after falling for Abdul Rahman. Sulaiman, the son of Abdul Rahman and Malavika Thampuratti, is nurtured in Carnatic classical music by his mother. His opponent in college, Unnikrishnan, son of a deceased Brahmin priest is also good at singing.

Unnikrishnan wins a musical competition at college which makes him sing at the famous Chembai Sangeethotsavam. But due to mistaken identities, Sulaiman makes it to the musical gala. He becomes famous among the people through his singing and the viewers begin to appreciate.

Sulaiman is forced to go to his grandfather's place to join a religious function. Gopika falls for Sulaiman instead of Unnikrishnan. In the end, we see that history repeats itself. Will the palace get a sultan or not? This forms the remaining story of the film.

== Cast ==
- Dileep as Sulaiman / Unnikrishnan Namboothiri (Fake)
- Narendra Prasad as Avittam Thirunal Narayana Varma, Malavika's father and Sulaiman's grandfather
- Preetha Vijayakumar as Gopika Varma Nair, Sulaiman's love interest
- Captain Raju as Abdul Rahman, Sulaiman's father
- Shruthi Raj as Sreelakshmi
- Innocent as Karyasthan Govindan Nair
- Cochin Haneefa as Beeran Kutty / Kochappa
- Jagathy Sreekumar as Parasuraman "Parassu" Namboothiri
- Harisree Ashokan as Augustine / Agasthyan Namboothiri, Sulaiman's best friend
- Ambika as Malavika Thampuratty, Narayana Varma's daughter and Sulaiman's mother
- Salim Kumar as Kareem
- Spadikam George as Sreekanta Varma, Gopika's father
- Subair as Rajasekhara Varma
- E. A. Rajendran as Balagopala Varma
- Kottayam Nazeer as Kasim
- Jagannatha Varma as Thirumangalathu Namboothiri
- M.S. Thripunithura as Vasudevan Namboothiri
- Baiju Ezhupunna as Marthandan
- Sudheesh as Unnikrishnan Namboothiri (original)
- Kozhikode Narayanan Nair as Hamsa, Abdul Rahman's Relative
- Tony as Ameer, Abdul Rahman's Relative
- Oduvil Unnikrishnan as D. Damodaran Namboothiri
- Anu Anand as Antony, Sulaiman's Friend
- Johny Antony as Unnikrishnan's Friend
- Udayakrishna as Unnikrishnan's Friend
- Bindu Ramakrishnan as Unnikrishnan's Mother
- Kottayam Purushan as Unnikrishnan's father

== Soundtrack ==
Both the music of the songs and lyrics were written by Kaithapram Damodaran Namboothiri.

No.	Song	Singers	Lyrics	Raga(s)
1	"Ananda Nandane Sandheham"	K. J. Yesudas	Kaithapram	(Ragamalika Kharaharapriya, Shanmukhapriya)
2	"Chittolam"	K. J. Yesudas, K. S. Chithra	Kaithapram	Anandabhairavi
3	"Gaayathi Gaayathi"	K. J. Yesudas, K. S. Chithra	Kaithapram	(Ragamalika Sindhu Bhairavi, Hindolam, Revathi, Mohanam)
4	"Iniyenthu Paadendu Njan" [F]	K. S. Chithra	Kaithapram	Desh
5	"Iniyenthu Paadendu Njan" [M]	K. J. Yesudas	Kaithapram	Desh
6	"Kanakasabhaathalam" [F]	Sangeetha	Kaithapram	Brindabani Sarang
7	"Kanakasabhaathalam" [M]	Madhu Balakrishnan	Kaithapram	Brindabani Sarang
8	"Maanikayaveena"	K. J. Yesudas	Kaithapram	Shree ragam

== Remade ==
It was remade in Telugu as Dhenikaina Ready, starring Vishnu Manchu and Hansika Motwani in 2012. The movie was dubbed in Malayalam as 'Endhinum Ready' and was released simultaneously with Telugu on 24 October 2012. It was also remade in Bengali, titled Khiladi.
