= Yuvam =

Malayalam film

- Directed by: Pinku Peter
- Written by: Pinku Peter
- Produced by: Johny Makkora
- Starring: Amith Chakalakkal; Dayyana Hameed; Nedumudi Venu; Abhishek Raveendran
- Cinematography: Sajith Purushan
- Edited by: Johnkutty
- Music by: Gopi Sundar
- Release date: 12 February 2021
- Running time: 113 min
- Country: India
- Language: Malayalam

Yuvam (English:Youth) is a 2021 Malayalam political thriller drama film directed by Pinku Peter. The movie go through the journey of three young advocates, who tries to prevent KSRTC being privatised due to debts and the unlawful actions by some politicians.

== Cast ==
- Amith Chakalakkal as Adv. Aby Mathew
- Abhirav Janan as Adv. Paul Varghese
- Nirmal Palazhi as Adv. Vinod Janardhanan
- Dayyana Hameed as Nimisha
- Indrans as Adv. Sreekanth Panicker
- Nedumudi Venu as Judge Ramakrishnan
- Saikumar as Chief Minister D.K. Srinivasan
- Vinod Kedamangalom
- Chembil Ashokan
- Kalabhavan Shajon as Rajesh MLA
- Jaffar Idukki as Babu, Transport Minister
- Kalabhavan Haneef as Chacko, KSRTC Employee
- Baiju Ezhupunna as Sabu Vattappara
- Vinod Kedamangalam as K.P. Amrith/Chachaji
- Aneesh G Menon as Sushanth Nair IAS, District Collector-Trivandrum
- Disney James as SI Kannappan
