= Tokyo Nagarathile Viseshangal =

Tokyo Nagarile Viseshangal
- Directed by: Jose Thomas
- Written by: Udaykrishna–Sibi K. Thomas
- Starring: Mukesh; Jagathy Sreekumar; Prem Kumar; Tony
- Cinematography: Venugopal
- Edited by: K. Rajagopal
- Music by: S. P. Venkatesh; Sunny Stephen; Violin Jacob
- Production company: Akai Films
- Distributed by: Akai Films
- Release date: 18 December 1999
- Country: India
- Language: Malayalam

Tokyo Nagarile Viseshangal (transl. The happenings at Tokyo Nagar) is a 1999 Indian Malayalam-language action comedy-drama film directed by Jose Thomas and written by Udaykrishna–Sibi K. Thomas. The film stars Mukesh, Jagathy Sreekumar, Prem Kumar and Tony. The film's musical score is by S. P. Venkatesh, Sunny Stephen and Violin Jacob. The film was originally released without a title and was titled post-release. movie was hit.

== Plot ==
At the beginning, we are shown a group of unsuspecting young women being trafficked to Bombay in the guise of Gulf jobs. While most of the girls lose their virginity before they realise the truth, three girls try to escape but are shot at by the traffickers. Two get shot dead whole one, Ganga, escapes. As she tries to secure a ride, she ends up in front of Gopalji's car, and he offers to take her back to Kerala and then secure a job for her in the Gulf as she wanted.

Back home in Tokyo Nagar, a chauvinistic residential colony of wannabe elites, Gopalji and his wife Chandramathi introduce Ganga as their daughter. Now Chandramathi happens to be the colony club secretary, and has a scheming rival in Unnikrishnan Menon, another rich resident. We are also shown that there is an attached colony of poor workers and porters, who the chauvinistic residential colony is trying to evict. The workers, lead by Chandrappan, is leading a losing fight with the authorities and system for their right to live in the place they have been living for almost 40 years.

Annie, a young woman among the workers, is supposedly working in Gulf, and returns to arrange her sisters' marriage. She turns a discouraging tone to Peter who she used to be in love with, to his dismay. We are shown hints that Annie is not really living a decent life in Gulf as is being thought, and we are later told that she was cheated into a sex trafficking ring in Bombay, and is deliberately staying away from Peter on self-loathing. The leader of this sex trafficking rings happens to be none other than Gopalji, and when she meets Ganga with him, she rightly guesses her to be his next victim.

Meanwhile, a petty thief who lives off tricking others have taken up residence in the colony under the guise of Col. R. K. Nair, intending to rob off the filthy rich residents one by one. As wife, he arranges for another fraud, a certain Chocolate Rani, who ekes out a living by seducing men and robbing them after feeding them drugged chocolates, to accompany and live with him in Tokyo Nagar. His first attempt in broad daylight turns sour and as he escapes dumping the stolen necklace, an unsuspecting Chandramathi gets caught as the thief, to her utter shame.

Menon's daughter Gatha, equally scheming, haughty, and chauvinistic, freshly returned from studies, poses a challenge to Chandramathi for the post of secretary, taking advantage of the situation that "Col." R. K. Nair's thievery with abandon has led to lots of residents losing valuables every day. While Gadha's attempt to frame the workers colony for the thefts remain unfruitful due to a sincere sub inspector, she and her father look for a Gurkha to guard the colony from thieves. An alarmed but quick-witted R. K. Nair uses the opportunity to induct his partner-in-crime as a Gurkha "Vikram Bolaram Singh," in response to which Chandramathi appoints Chandrappan as a night watchman for the colony from her own side as secretary, much to the dismay of Gadha. A night, Chandrappan spots R. K. Nair entering Menon's house and follows him inside, but is locked in Gadha's room with her, and happens to watch her naked, to her shock. At a loss, Gadha allows him to escape then, but promptly gets him arrested at the nearest opportunity when Chandrappan procures a set of ornaments for his friend Peter's sister's marriage from a shady dealer who buys stolen articles from R. K. Nair. Chandrappan is sent to jail, and the workers fear being evicted without a leader to fight for them.

The arrest of the watchman appointed by Chandramathi for theft destroys her reputation further. Showing no reluctance to use her girly charms with men, Gatha defeats Chandramathi in a fiercely contested election for the post of secretary. A humiliated Chandramathi and Gopalji decide to wreck the celebrations, and hire an infamous ruthless goon Kadappuram Karunan for the purpose, who, manages the feat by intoxicating the elephant hired for the event.

In retaliation, an angry Unnikrishnan Nair arranges his own men to kidnap Menon's apparent daughter Ganga and dumb her at Kadappuram Karunan's shack, expecting the ruthless goon to violate and wreck her, mistaking her for the escort that he had demanded Menon for. However, it turns out that Karunan's sidekick was bluffing when he asked for an escort, and that Karunan was actually a virgin, and he falls for Ganga, marrying her. At Ganga's insistence, Karunan is forced to mend his violent ways, turn a new page, and comes to live at the workers colony adjacent to Tokyo Nagar. Chandrappan also returns from custody soon enough, and the fight between workers and Tokyo Nagar elites reaches a peak.

During a face off, Gadha challenges Chandrappan to purchase the land for 50 lakhs if he could, and a stupid Chandrappan accepts the challenge without any plan. At the end, he decides to procure the money by robbing the filthy rich residents of Tokyo Nagar itself, and in the process, discovers R. K. Nair's true nature, and they both team up for the cause. When Chandrappan is almost caught once, R. K. Nair is forced to save the day by declaring him his estranged son. A naughty Chocolate Rani uses the occasion to hug the handsome Chandrappan tightly under the pretext of being his step-mom.

When it seems that Chandrappan might actually procure the 50 lakhs needed to close the deal, a scheming Gadha pretends to fall in love with Chandrappan to spy on him. Chandrappan, who sees right through her easily, plays into her game, and exploits every chance to romance the cute Gadha, caressing her untouched assets and kissing her.

However, the night before the final day, Chandrappan is at the end of his wits, and still short of a couple of lakhs to the target of 50 lakhs, with no houses left to buy, and decides to rob a jewellery, but the team gets caught in the process. While R. K. Nair and Vikram Singh are finally exposed, Chandrappan manages to run and find rescue with Gopalji, who jumps on the chance and uses an unsuspecting Chandrappan to bring Ganga to his home. The bitter Gopalji had also kidnapped Gadha and was planning to sell her off to Bombay sex trafficking rings to mete revenge on her for humiliating him and his wife.

However, Chandrappan and Karunan join forces before the don could smuggle a drugged Gadha to Bombay and deflower her, and after a tense fight, rescue her back home. Gopalji is exposed, and arrested with the don. A humbled Gadha realises the error of her ways and decides to abandon all efforts to evict the workers colony, and a happy Chandrappan unites with her, probably realising how hot a chick she is once tamed properly.

== Cast ==
- Mukesh as Chenkalcheri Chandrappan
- Vijayaraghavan as Kadappuram Karunan
- Jagathy Sreekumar as Col. R. K. Nair
- Maathu as Ganga
- Athira as Gatha Menon
- Prem Kumar as S. I.
- Tony as Peter
- George as Dinesh
- Bindu Panicker as Chandramathi
- C. I. Paul as Gopalan Nair
- Harishree Ashokan as Vikram Bolaram Singh
- Oduvil Unnikrishnan as Unnikrishna Menon
- Kanakalatha as Kanakam Unnikrishan
- Darshana as Annie
- Priyanka Anoop as Chocolate Rani
- Baiju Ezhupunna as Irumbukai Mathachen
- Salim Kumar as Kadappuram Paarayi
- Udaykrishna as Mediaperson
- Kalabhavan Navas in the song "Chenkalcheriye Unnam Vacha" (Cameo appearance)
- Actor Motta Rajendran appears as one of the thugs fighting Kadappuram Karunan as he was working as a stunt double in the movie. As it was before his accident, Rajendran can be seen with his hair, facial hair. It was during the shooting of a fight sequence in this film that he fell into a pool contaminated with runoff chemicals from a factory, resulted in complete loss of his body hair.

== Title ==
The film was released without a name, the makers asking the audience for suggestions and offering a prize to whoever came up with the best one. They finally selected Tokyo Nagarile Visheshangal from the list of suggested names.

== Soundtrack ==
The music was composed by S. P. Venkatesh, Sunny Stephen, and Violin Jacob and the lyrics were written by Balu Kiriyath and Gireesh Puthenchery.

No.	Song	Singers	Lyrics	Length (m:ss)
1	"Chenkalcheriye Unnam Vacha"	K. G. Markose	Balu Kiriyath	
2	"Enthininnum"	Madhu Balakrishnan, H. Rajesh	Gireesh Puthenchery	
3	"Minnaaminni Ponnum Muthe"	K. S. Chithra, K. G. Markose	Gireesh Puthenchery	
4	"Sur Barsaaye Theri Sarod Se"	Madhu Balakrishnan, H. Rajesh	Gireesh Puthenchery	
5	"Swarnameda"	Biju Narayanan	Gireesh Puthenchery	
6	"Thrilling Incidents" (Theme)			
7	"Venpraavukal"	K. G. Markose, Radhika Thilak	Gireesh Puthenchery	
