= Hitler Brothers =

1997 Indian film

- Theatrical release poster
- Directed by: Sandhya Mohan
- Written by: Udaykrishna–Sibi K. Thomas
- Produced by: E. Unnikrishnan
- Starring: Prem Kumar; Vanitha Vijayakumar; Jagathy Sreekumar
- Cinematography: Madhu Adoor
- Edited by: K. Rajagopal
- Music by: S. P. Venkatesh
- Production company: Swetha Films
- Distributed by: Shobhachithira Enterprises
- Release date: 11 July 1997
- Country: India
- Language: Malayalam

Hitler Brothers is a 1997 Indian Malayalam-language comedy-drama film directed by Sandhya Mohan and written by Udaykrishna–Sibi K. Thomas. The film stars Prem Kumar, Vanitha Vijayakumar, and Jagathy Sreekumar, with Harishree Ashokan, Indrans, Mala Aravindan, Paravoor Bharathan, Jose Pellissery, and A. C. Zainuddin in supporting roles. The film has musical score by S. P. Venkatesh.

Hitler Brothers was a commercial success at the box office.

== Plot ==
Nandini, a college student, is the sole niece of four brothers—Ramankutty, Achuthankutty, Shankarankutty, and Keshavankutty—who maintain a close familial bond. Nandini, without immediate family, resides in a women's hostel near her college. Despite occasional advances from peers, the four brothers, playfully nicknamed the "Hitler brothers" by youngsters, act as vigilant guardians.

Concerned for Nandini's well-being, the brothers decide to arrange her marriage to a prosperous individual. Gopan, a wealthy doctor, is chosen as the prospective groom, and Nandini agrees to the arrangement. However, despite Gopan's family expressing no expectation of dowry, it becomes evident that Gopan's interest in the marriage is tied to Nandini's properties.

Nandini owns a property leased to the Kerala Police for use as a police station. The brothers seeking to allocate it as dowry for Nandini, harshly ask the police to vacate the premises. However, head constable Bhaktha Valsalan, misunderstanding their intentions, handles the situation physically, prompting the brothers to consult an advocate, Manmadhan, and opt for legal resolution.

A new sub-inspector, Sundaran, takes charge, who resides with his father and sister opposite Nandini's hostel. Nandini and her uncles serve a legal notice to Sundaran, requesting the vacation of the police station. Meanwhile, Manmadhan, the advocate, develops a romantic interest in Nandini, who casually redirects his love letter to Sundaran's sister, Sundari, fostering a reciprocal sentiment.

Gopan invites Nandini to a hotel room, attempting to coerce her into a physical relationship. Expressing her strong disapproval, Nandini firmly communicates her reluctance to proceed with the marriage. Sundaran and a police squad inadvertently arrive at the hotel, where Sundaran, witnessing the situation, intervenes, saving Nandini and expressing his disdain for Gopan.

Gopan manipulates the brothers into believing that Nandini misunderstood him. They disagree with Nandini's decision to withdraw from the marriage. Nandini and Sundaran develop a romantic interest. Manmadhan writes to Nandini expressing distress and hinting at suicidal thoughts. She redirects his letter to Sundari, who rescues him from a potentially harmful situation involving a moving train. With limited options, Manmadhan reluctantly agrees to marry Sundari. Now in-laws, Manmadhan and Sundaran become friends, leading to Manmadhan withdrawing from representing the brothers against Sundaran. Then enters Narendran, Nandini's step brother to claim her properties. Narendran learns that Nandini is being forced to marry Gopan, he along with Manmadan helps Sundaran to marry Nandini. An angry Gopan gifts a bomb to couple unknowing to them. Hitler brothers learns about the bomb with the help of Narendran & CI Trivikraman rushes to save Nandini & Sundaran. Gopan gets arrested.

== Cast ==
- Prem Kumar as Sub inspector Sundaran
- Vanitha Vijayakumar as Nandini, niece of "Hitler Brothers"
- Jagathy Sreekumar as Advocate Manmadhan
- Harishree Ashokan as Police head constable Bhaktha Valsalan
- Indrans as Police constable Balaraman
- Mala Aravindan as Ramankutty, 3rd "Hitler Brother"
- Paravoor Bharathan as Achuthankutty, 1st "Hitler Brother"
- Jose Pellissery as Shankarankutty, 2nd "Hitler Brother"
- A. C. Zainuddin as Keshavankutty, 4th "Hitler Brother"
- Vijayakumar as Doctor Gopan, Nandini's fiancé
- Kuthiravattam Pappu as Nanappan, father of Sundaran and Sundari
- Sharmily as Sundari, Sundaran's sister
- Augustine as Govindan, a marriage broker
- Janardhanan as Sub inspector Trivikraman Pilla
- Baiju Ezhupunna as Chinna Thambi
- Rajkumar as Periya Thambi
- Kalabhavan Navas as Thankappan, a bus conductor
- Ravi Vallathol as Head constable Kuttanpilla
- Bindu Varappuzha
- Salu Koottanad as Phone booth owner
- Shaju Sreedhar as Youngster courting Nandini
- Babu Antony as Narendran (cameo appearance)

== Soundtrack ==
The music was composed by S. P. Venkatesh and the lyrics were written by Kaithapram.

No.	Song	Singers	Lyrics	Length (m:ss)
1	"Kannaadi Maalika"	K. S. Chithra, M. G. Sreekumar	Kaithapram	
2	"Panimathi"	K. S. Chithra, Biju Narayanan	Kaithapram	
