= Ambadi Thannilorunni =

1986 film directed by Alleppey Ranganath

- Directed by: Alleppey Ranganath
- Written by: Alleppey Ranganath
- Screenplay by: Alleppey Ranganath
- Produced by: C. S. Abraham
- Starring: Jagathy Sreekumar; Anand; Vinayan; C. S. Abraham
- Cinematography: Saloo George
- Edited by: K. Rajagopal
- Music by: Alleppey Ranganath
- Production company: Shiny Films
- Distributed by: Shiny Films
- Release date: 14 October 1986
- Country: India
- Language: Malayalam

Ambadi Thannilorunni is a 1986 Indian Malayalam film, directed by Alleppey Ranganath and produced by C. S. Abraham. The film stars Jagathy Sreekumar, Anand, Vinayan and C. S. Abraham in the lead roles. The film has musical score by Alleppey Ranganath. The movie takes its title from a song in the 1972 movie Chembarathi.

== Cast ==
- Jagathy Sreekumar
- Anand as Deepu
- Vinayan
- C. S. Abraham
- M. G. Soman
- Minumohan
- Santhakumari
- Soumini as Stella
- Krishna Prasad

== Soundtrack ==
The music was composed by Alleppey Ranganath and the lyrics were written by Muttar Sasikumar.

No.	Song	Singers	Lyrics	Length (m:ss)
1	"Aalaapanam"	K. S. Chithra	Muttar Sasikumar	
2	"Akkuthikkuthaanavarambe"	K. J. Yesudas, Ashalatha, Ampalappuzha Jyothy	Muttar Sasikumar	
3	"Sandhye Shaarada Sandhye"	K. J. Yesudas	Muttar Sasikumar	
