= Jose Pellissery =

Indian actor (1950–2004)

- Jose Pellisery
- Born: 1950
- Died: 5 December 2004 (aged 53–54); Chalakudy, Thrissur, Kerala, India
- Occupation: Actor
- Spouse: Lilly
- Children: 2 (incl. Lijo Jose)

Jose Pellissery (1950 – 5 December 2004) was an Indian film and theatre actor.

== Biography ==
As an actor in Malayalam cinema, he played supporting roles in about 100 films. His 15-year film career included roles in such movies as Aadhaaram, Akashadoothu, Naadody, and Ghazal.

Pellissery was a partner of the theatre company Chalakudy Sarathy Theatres. He performed in about a dozen plays produced by this company under the direction of Thilakan, including Five Star Hospital, Alakal, Indhanam, Fassahu, Mochanam Nale, Adisankaran Janicha Naattil, and Chamayam.

Pellissery also acted in a number of Malayalam TV serials, such as Chitta, Meghanidhi, and Kayamkulam Kochunni.

Pellissery died at a private hospital in Chalakudy on 5 December 2004, following a heart attack. He was 54. He is survived by his wife Lilly, son Lijo Jose Pellissery and a daughter, (Lijomol Jose Pallissery). His son, Lijo Jose Pellissery, is a prominent malayalam filmmaker.

== Awards ==
- Kerala State Award for the Best Stage Actor - Fassahu

== Filmography ==
Year	Title	Role	Notes
1990	Malayogom	Man at the Church	
1991	Karpporadeepam		
1992	Soorya Gayathri	Kuriakose	
1992	Savidham	Film Producer	
1992	Cheppadividya		
1992	Naadody	Narayanan	
1992	My Dear Muthachan	Lawyer at the courthouse	
1992	Grihaprevesam	Lawyer	
1992	Champakulam Thachan	Vakkachan	
1992	Ayalathe Adheham	Joseph	
1992	Aadhaaram	Lazar	
1993	Samagamam	Enashu	
1993	Janam	C. M. Nair	
1993	Injakkadan Mathai & Sons	Kuriachan	
1993	Ghoshayaathra	Kumaran	
1993	Porutham	Shivasankaran	
1993	Ponnuchami		
1993	Samooham	Sukumaran Nair	
1993	Akashadoothu	Varghese	
1993	Aagneyam	Rappayi	
1994	Chukkan	Manjooran	
1994	Paalayam	Mathai	
1994	Varanamaalyam	MLA	
1994	The Porter	Kunjunni Kuruppu	
1994	Chief Minister K. R. Gowthami	Sreedharan Potty	
1994	Manathe Vellitheru	Merlin's Manager	
1994	Malappuram Haji Mahanaya Joji	Mukundan Menon	
1994	Kudumba Vishesham	Kunjappu	
1995	Vrudhanmare Sookshikkuka	Novelist	
1995	Mangalam Veettil Manaseswari Gupta	Sahadevan	
1995	No. 1 Snehatheeram Bangalore North		
1995	Special Squad	Adv. Shivadasa Menon	
1995	Sargavasantham	Joy's father	
1995	Kalyanji Anandji	Lakshminarayanan	
1995	Kusruthikaatu	College Principal	
1995	Aksharam	Minister's Secretary	
1996	Mookkilla Rajyathu Murimookkan Rajavu		
1996	Dilliwala Rajakumaran	Krishna Murthy	
1996	Kaathil Oru Kinnaram	R.P Menon	
1996	Hitlist	Soofikutty	
1996	Kanchanam	Pattar	
1996	Sathyabhamakkoru Premalekhanam	Vallyaveedan	
1996	Kaliveedu		
1997	The Good Boys	Kurup	
1997	Kudamattam		
1997	Anubhoothi		
1997	Newspaper Boy		
1997	Nagarapuranam	Pankajakshan	
1997	Kalyana Unnikal	Parakkal Avarachan	
1997	Janathipathyam	Eeppachan	
1997	Hitler Brothers	Sankarankutty	
1998	Vismayam	Kochu Krishnan	
1998	Sreekrishnapurathe Nakshathrathilakkam	Ramkumar	
1998	Samaantharangal	Financier	
1998	Mayajalam	Paramu Menon	
1998	Chenapparambile Aanakkariyam	Manickyamangalathu Ramunni Menon	
1998	Pranayavarnangal	Principal Ashokan	
1998	Gloria Fernandez From USA		
1998	Harikrishnans	Jose-paapa	
1998	Amma Ammaayiyamma	Sanku	
1999	English Medium		
1999	Captain	Antony	
1999	Garshom	Varghese	
1999	Aayiram Meni	Kuriachan	
2000	Melevaryathe Malakhakkuttikal	Josephettan	
2000	Madhuranombarakattu		
2000	India Gate	Settu	
2000	Rakkilikal		
2000	Nadan Pennum Natupramaniyum	Kuriakose	
2000	Dreams		
2000	Rapid Action Force	Minister	
2000	Priyankari		
2000	Darling Darling	Doctor	
2001	Kattu Vannuvilichapol		
2001	Praja	Priest	
2001	Pranayaaksharangal		
2001	Nakshathragal Parayathirunnathu		
2001	Dupe Dupe Dupe		
2001	Kattuvannu Vilichappol	Sankara Pillai	
2001	Ee Nadu Innale Vare	Parameswaran	
2001	Pranayamanthram		
2001	Malavika		
2001	Mazhamegha Pravukal		
2001	Fort Kochi		
2001	Dhosth	Menon	
2002	Thilakkam	Shankunny Nair	
2002	Pranayamanithooval	Principal	
2002	Grand Mother		
2002	Bheri		
2002	Mazhathullikkilukkam		
2002	Desam		
2002	Chathurangam	Devasya	
2002	Kalyanaraman	Swamy	
2003	Melvilasam Sariyanu	Gokuldas	
2003	Malsaram		
2003	Sadanandante Samayam	Vaidyar	
2003	Varum Varunnu Vannu		
2003	Leader	Minister	
2003	Pulival Kalyanam	Swamy	
2004	Vellinakshatram	Indu's father	
2005	Junior Senior	Varma	

== TV Serial ==
- Pettamma
- Manalanagaram
