= Thuruppugulan =

Thuruppu Gulan
- Directed by: Johny Antony
- Written by: Udayakrishna; Siby K. Thomas
- Produced by: Milan Jaleel
- Starring: Mammootty; Innocent
- Cinematography: Sanjeev Sankar
- Edited by: Ranjan Abraham
- Music by: Alex Paul
- Production company: Galaxy film Production
- Distributed by: Galaxy films
- Release date: 14 April 2006
- Running time: 155 minutes
- Country: India
- Language: Malayalam

Thuruppugulan is a 2006 Indian Malayalam-language action comedy film directed by Johny Antony, written by the Udayakrishna/Siby K. Thomas duo and produce by Milan Jaleel under his banner Galaxy Films. The film stars Mammootty in the title role, alongside an ensemble cast of Innocent, Sneha, Devan, Kalasala Babu, Suresh Krishna, Jagathy Sreekumar, Raj Kapoor, Vijayaraghavan, Salim Kumar, Harisree Ashokan, Cochin Haneefa, Baburaj, Janardanan and Suraj Venjaramoodu in major supporting roles. The music was composed by Alex Paul.

The film follows Kunjumon, a Calicut-based restaurant owner, who is known by his nickname 'Gulan' due to his gambling skills. The film was released on April 14, 2006, and coincided with the 'Vishu' festival.

== Plot ==
Mr. Chandrashekar Menon, a millionaire business tycoon, invests in real estate and he entrusts one of his lieutenants, Sreedharan Unnithan, to construct a 5-star hotel in Kochi. He give the small plot adjacent to the 5-star hotel property to Kochuthoma, Kunjumon's father, where he ran his small restaurant all these while. Menon leaves for Singapore and Kunjumon is sent to Calicut by his father, who fears that his son's life might be in danger after Kunjumon badly injured a gangster who tried to kill Menon.

Twenty years later, Unnithan fails in forcing Kochuthoma to vacate the site since the restaurant is damaging the reputation of the hotel. Unnithan uses a rowdy named Tipper Vasu to make Kochuthoma sign a contract to vacate, but Kunjumon arrives and fights with Vasu. Kunjumon defeats Vasu in the fight. Unnithan then uses Circle Inspector Aarumugam to remove Kochuthoma. But, Unnithan arrives and uses his money and power to jail Kunjumon and Kochuthoma.

Meanwhile, Menon decides to return to his native land to see his daughter Lakshmi getting married. But Unnithan and his sons have him framed and imprisoned with the help of Unnithan's son Raveendran's friend and international criminal Gavan Joseph. Lakshmi travels to Kerala to help her father. After events, she meets up with the hero Gulaan Kunjumon (this part takes place before Kunjumon and his father were jailed), the hero of the Calicut Market. Both of them go to Kochi. To avenge his imprisonment, Kunjumon leases the bar in the 5-star hotel through Kunjumon's relative Swamy, a drunkard gold merchant, and spoils the hotel's reputation. With many twists and turns and a lot of misunderstanding, it becomes clear to Lakshmi that Kunjumon, aka Gulan, is the son of Kochuthoma and Kunjumon finally realizes that Lakshmi is the daughter of Menon, not Unnithan.

Kunjumon and Lakshmi struggle to release Menon and imprison Unnithan and his cruel sons. Finally, Menon is released from prison and returns to Kerala. This time, Kochuthoma tries to block an agreement regarding Unnithan as the future head of the hotel. Kunjumon, along with Menon, Khader and Swamy, rushes to the hotel to fight. The movie ends with Kunjumon tearing up the contract.

== Cast ==
- Mammootty as Kunjumon (Gulan)
  - Ashwin C. Menon as Young Kunjumon (Gulan)
- Innocent as Kochuthoma, Kunjumon's father
- Kalashala Babu as Sreedharan Unnithan
- Jagathy Sreekumar as Swamy
- Cochin Haneefa as Raman Kartha
- Salim Kumar as "Khadar & Khadar"
- Harisree Ashokan as Shathru
- Sneha as Lakshmi C.Menon (Voice-over by Sreeja Ravi)
- Raj Kapoor as CI Aarumugham
- Suresh Krishna as Raveendran, Unnithan's eldest son
- Devan as Chandrasekharan Menon, Lakshmi's father
- John D'Souza as Gavan Joseph
- Janardhanan as Constable Pillai
- Vijayaraghavan as DGP Rajendra Varma IPS
- Suraj Venjaramood as Appukuttan
- Baburaj as Mahi, Unnithan's younger son
- Baiju Ezhupunna as Rajan, Unnithan's youngest son
- Bheeman Raghu as Tipper Vasu
- Kalabhavan Shajon as Keshavan, Lorry Driver
- Urmila Unni as Rajendra Varma's wife
- Ponnamma Babu as Dance teacher
- Ambika Mohan as Unnithan's wife
- Sadiq as Govindan, Sub Registrar
- Anal Arasu as Killadi Raja
- Kozhikode Narayanan Nair as Kannan, Menon's friend
- Vysakh as Dineshan, Hotel Receptionist
- Kalabhavan Haneef as Punoose, a drunkard
- Soumya Menon as Unnithan's daughter
- Sheetal Bedi as Special appearance in the song "Alakadalil"

== Soundtrack ==
The movie has three songs composed by Alex Paul and lyrics by Kaithapram

Song	Singer(s)
"ThuruppugulaanThuruppugulaan"	Afsal
"Alakadalil"	Mahadevan and Cicily
"Pidiyaana"	Vineeth Sreenivasan

== Release ==
The film was released on 14 April 2006.

=== Critical reception ===
India Glitz criticized several aspects of the film, claiming that "even though the basic plot seems to be promising, the film has lost the tempo in the second half cluttered to become a star show." The review concluded that "the highlight of the film is the brisk pace by which the director Johny Antony passes through the events without lending time to think about the other loopy crass. The film is sure to hold masses for its wholesome entertainment, even though in weaker terms."

=== Box office ===
The film was one of the highest grossing Malayalam movie of 2006. The film was blockbuster at the box office.
