= C.I.D. Moosa =

2003 film directed by Johny Antony

- DVD cover
- Directed by: Johny Antony
- Written by: Udaykrishna–Sibi K. Thomas
- Produced by: Dileep; Anoop
- Starring: Dileep; Bhavana; Harisree Ashokan; Jagathy Sreekumar; Cochin Haneefa; Salim Kumar
- Cinematography: Saloo George
- Edited by: Ranjan Abraham
- Music by: Vidyasagar
- Production company: Graand Production
- Distributed by: Kalasangham Films
- Release date: 4 July 2003 (India)
- Running time: 170 minutes
- Country: India
- Language: Malayalam
- Budget: ₹2.5 crore (US$270,000)

C.I.D Moosa is a 2003 Indian Malayalam-language action comedy film directed by Johny Antony (in his directorial debut) written by the script-writing duo Udaykrishna–Sibi K. Thomas, and co-produced by Dileep. It stars Dileep in the title role of a private detective, and features an ensemble cast of Bhavana, Ashish Vidyarthi, Sharat Saxena, Murali, Harisree Ashokan, Cochin Haneefa, Jagathy Sreekumar, Vijayaraghavan, Captain Raju, Oduvil Unnikrishnan, Sukumari, and Salim Kumar. The film follows Moolamkuzhiyil Sahadevan, popularly known as CID Moosa, a young man from a police family who sets out to prove his worth as a detective while uncovering a terrorist plot.

The film was released in 4 July 2003. It was a box office success, becoming the second highest-grossing Malayalam film of the year, behind Balettan. Known for its slapstick comedy, it has developed a cult following. C.I.D Moosa was remade in Tamil as Cheena Thaana 001, in Kannada as CID Eesha and in Telugu as Ramachari. A sequel has been rumoured to be in the works by the makers.

== Plot ==
Moolamkuzhiyil Sahadevan is the son of a police constable named Prabhakaran, who works in the local police department's dog squad; their dog Arjun a German Shepherd is a trained member of the squad with a unique ability to nab culprits and sniff out clues. Sahadevan has only one ambition: to join the Kerala Police department for which he clears his exams and prepares for the physical test. However, Sahadevan is not on good terms with his brother-in-law Pitambaran (who too is a Sub-inspector in the force) since he married Sahadevan's elder sister after an elopement.

Meanwhile, a terrorist leader named Khalid "Baba" Muhammed, who is incarcerated in the Tihar Jail, formulates a plot to murder the new Chief Minister of Kerala Ravi Menon with the help of a shrewd and corrupt Police Commissioner Gowrishankar. Menon previously served as the Union Minister of State for Home Affairs where he ordered for the quelling of Baba's terrorist organization, which led to Baba's imprisonment and the slaying of his family. Baba and Shankar arranged 3 terrorists Randheer, Amar and Jandu to implant a bomb inside the hospital where Menon is undergoing treatment, but Sahadevan and Arjun find the bomb and throw it out before it explodes, though Arjun ends up being injured. Despite this, Sahadevan is able to arrange medical treatment to restore Arjun back to full health.

In response to Sahadevan's actions at the hospital, Gowrishankar (with help from Pitambaran) intentionally makes Sahadevan fail his physical test. Sahadevan is at first dismayed and discouraged, but considers becoming a private detective and following the footsteps of his uncle 'Karamchand'. Karamchand willingly leaves his office and tools to his nephew, and Sahadevan adopts the pseudonym CID 'Moosa' (from the first syllables of his first and last names). In his first assignment, Moosa and his associates take it upon themselves to investigate the attack on the CM, and manage to nab Randheer (who planted the bomb at the hospital) and surrender him over to the police, impressing the DIG Sathyanath (who happens to be Menon's nephew).

However, Gowrishankar secretly kills Randheer to avoid an interrogation, and destroys Moosa's office after learning that the firm doesn't have a license. The remaining two terrorists then plant another bomb on Menon's car in an attempt to kill him, but this is foiled when Moosa tries to meet Menon to file a complaint about the office ransacking, saving Menon from being killed by the explosion. Moosa then deliberately decides to not complain, to earn false praises by the public and Menon as the hero who saved the CM's life. Upon hearing what has happened, Baba furiously breaks out of prison as he personally intends to help Gowrishankar, Amar and Jandu in finishing off both Menon and Moosa. After some false leads involving a local lunatic who gives Moosa the run-around several times, Moosa later finds Amar, recognizing him as the second terrorist who planned the bomb at the hospital along with Randheer.

With that in mind, Moosa tries to nab Amar, but accidentally kills him by shooting him in the head. This puts him in trouble, as he was told by Sathyanath only to shoot below the knee or he would face criminal charges. However, Sathyanath learns that the Central government issued a reward of ₹ 5 lakhs for Amar's head which Moosa will receive, much to the commissioner's dismay. In the meantime, Meena, who Moosa relentlessly tries to woo without success, informs him that Randheer, Amar and Jandu were paying guests in her apartment, and that she filed a complaint to the commissioner as Randheer and Jandu were absconding. However, upon being told by Moosa that they were terrorists and they were murdered by Gowrishankar, Meena ends up being arrested by Gowrishankar under the false charges of harbouring terrorists.

Moosa tries to plead for Meena's innocence to Gowrishankar by stating that she was unaware of the terrorists' identities, but he refuses and takes Meena into custody. As Gowrishankar tortures Meena, he tries to molest her, but Moosa arrives to the rescue by thrashing him before releasing Meena, who reciprocates her feelings to Moosa in return. Because of this, Gowrishankar issues an arrest warrant on Moosa approved by a reluctant Menon. Before the arrest comes to pass, Moosa sneaks into Menon's house to plead his innocence to Menon, who unsurprisingly states that he already knows it by admitting that he witnessed Baba walking on the road on his way home, and is sure he's behind the attacks.

As Menon explains Baba's backstory to Moosa, including the fact that Baba's men killed one of Menon's daughters in the past, the latter arrives and shoots Menon in the arm, forcing Moosa to shoot him back to fend him off and save Menon. Realizing that Baba and the commissioner are in cahoots with each other, Moosa drives Menon to safety in his detective car with Arjun. Using the pursuer-repellent gadgets in his car, Moosa is able to evade the cops pursuing him. However, Baba and the commissioner intercept them, and as just Baba is about to finish Moosa, he uses his wits to save Menon and Arjun and shoots both Baba and the commissioner. With his name cleared, Moosa is declared a hero by the citizens and authorities for foiling Baba's plot. He and Arjun are sent to Scotland Yard for advanced professional training. Before leaving, Moosa bids farewell to his family, friends and associates (with even Sathyanath and Pitambaran paying their respects and waving goodbye to him). However, at the end, Moosa's Private jet is hijacked by the lunatic from earlier, who tied the pilot up in the rear. As Sahadevan screams in terror, the lunatic commences lift-off, and the jet is last seen veering wildly into the clouds after a series of barrel rolls.

== Cast ==
- Dileep as Moolamkuzhiyil Sahadevan aka C.I.D Moosa, a private detective
- Bhavana as Meenakshi Patel / Meena, Sahadevan's love interest
- Ashish Vidyarthi as City Police Commissioner Gaurishankar IPS
- Sharat Saxena as Khalid Mohammad Baba, a terrorist mastermind
- Murali as M.S Ravi Menon, Chief Minister of Kerala, Former Union Minister of State for Home Affairs, an honest righteous patriotic and straightforward politician
- Jagathy Sreekumar as SI Peethambaran, Sahadevan's brother-in-law
- Harisree Asokan as "Thorappan" Kochunni/C.I.D Kochunni, Crooked thief and Sahadevan's friend
- Cochin Haneefa as Constable Vikraman / C.I.D Vikram, Sahadevan's confidant
- Oduvil Unnikrishnan as head constable Moolamkuzhiyil Prabhakaran / C.I.D Prabhu, Sahadevan's father
- Captain Raju as Karunan Chanthakkavala / Detective Karamchand, Sahadevan's uncle
- Salim Kumar as Unnamed Insane man
- Sukumari as Girija, Sahadevan's mother
- Vijayaraghavan as DIG Sathyanarayanan IPS
- Indrans as Theekkanal Varkey, journalist
- Bindu Panicker as Ramani, Peethambaran's wife and Sahadevan's sister
- Paravoor Bharathan as Ramdev Patel, Meena's grandfather
- Subbalakshmi as Savithri Devi, Meena's Grandmother
- Kunchan as Issac Chacko, Veterinary Doctor
- Machan Varghese as Police Constable Sebastian
- Geetha Salam as Kallan Kunjappu, Kochunni's father
- Abu Salim as CI George Eapen
- Narayanankutty as Police Constable Gopalan
- Kalabhavan Shajohn as Police Constable Varghese
- Reena as Sumitra Nambiar, Ravi Menon's wife
- Nandu Pothuval as Tailor Sugunan
- Kalabhavan Haneef as House Broker
- Kalabhavan Rahman as Ramakrishnan, neighbor of Peethambaran
- Kazan Khan as Terrorist Randheer
- Sudheer Sukumaran as Terrorist Jandu
- Shweta Agarwal (Special Appearance in the song "James Bond")

== Production ==
The title and character name was adopted from CID Moosa comics written and created by Kannadi Viswanathan.

== Soundtrack ==
C.I.D. Moosa

Soundtrack album by Vidyasagar
- Released: 29 June 2003
- Recorded: Varsha Vallaki studio, chennai
- Genre: Film soundtrack
- Length: 20:36
- Language: Malayalam
- Label: Speed Music video
- Producer: Vidyasagar

Vidyasagar chronology
Parthiban Kanavu (2003)	C.I.D. Moosa (2003)	Pattalam (2003)

The film featured a soundtrack composed by Vidyasagar collaborating with Dileep for sixth time. All lyrics are written by Gireesh Puthenchery.

Song title	Singers	Raga(s)	Notes
"James Bond"	Karthik		
"Maine Pyar Kiya"	S. P. Balasubrahmanyam		
"Theeppori Pambaram"	K. J. Yesudas		
"Kadirangi Oodi"	V. Devanand, Chorus	Kalyani	
"Chilamboli Katte"	Udit Narayan, Sujatha	Shuddha Dhanyasi	
"Mister Maker"	Phil Gallagher		

== Reception ==
=== Box office ===
CID Moosa was a commercial success at the box office. The film was the second highest-grossing Malayalam film of that year, behind Balettan. It was made on a budget of ₹2.5 crore at a relatively higher budget for a Malayalam film at that time.

=== Critical response ===
The film is considered as one of the best slapstick comedy films in Malayalam, it has also achieved a cult fan following. In 2016, art house filmmaker Adoor Gopalakrishnan stated that his favourite film of Dileep is C.I.D. Moosa.

== Legacy ==
Since its release, CID Moosa has attained cult status in Malayalam cinema and is frequently cited among the most popular comedy films of the early 2000s. The film's dialogues, comic situations, and character mannerisms became widely quoted in Kerala popular culture and continue to be referenced in media and online platforms.

The success of the film consolidated Dileep's reputation as a leading comic actor of the period. In subsequent years, the film has remained a recurring point of reference in discussions of Malayalam slapstick cinema, with its scenes and catchphrases continuing to circulate in internet memes and nostalgic retrospectives.

== Remakes ==
Following the success of CID Moosa, it was remade in Tamil as Cheena Thaana 001 in 2007, in Kannada as CID Eesha in 2013 and in Telugu as Ramachari in 2013.

== Sequel ==
In 2016, it was revealed that a sequel is in development by the same team. But later on 28 October 2020, actor Dileep himself launched the promo of an animated series based on CID Moosa. The actor announced that a CID Moosa animation film will soon hit the screens after 17 years since its release. There has been no update about the animated film since then.

Later, in 2023, during a promotional event for Dileep's Voice of Sathyanathan, director Johny Antony confirmed that a live-action sequel for C.I.D. Moosa will indeed happen in the near future.
