= Ezhara Ponnana =

- Directed by: Thulasidas
- Written by: Reghunath Paleri
- Produced by: Joy Thomas
- Starring: Jayaram; Siddique; Kanaka; Thilakan; Babu Antony
- Cinematography: Saloo George
- Edited by: G.Murali
- Music by: Johnson
- Production company: Jubilee Productions
- Distributed by: Jubilee Productions
- Release date: 4 June 1992
- Country: India
- Language: Malayalam

Ezhara Ponnana is a 1992 Indian Malayalam film, directed by Thulasidas and produced by Joy Thomas. The film stars Jayaram, Siddique, Kanaka, Thilakan and Babu Antony in lead roles. The film had musical score by Johnson.

== Plot ==
Madhava Menon's son Balan has been missing for the past 18 years. He is believed to be dead by the villagers and relatives. Though Menon and his future daughter-in-law per customs does not believe so. Meanwhile, Vikraman, a Mumbai-based smuggler comes to the village and takes up the role of Balan. Everyone in the family is happy. But problems ensue when the real Balan returns and gang members of Vikraman's comes to get him back.

== Cast ==
- Jayaram as Balan / Vikraman
- Siddique as Dasan
- Kanaka as Ashwathi
- Thilakan as Madhava Menon
- Anju as Renu
- K. P. A. C. Lalitha as Leelavathi
- Sai Kumar as Balan
- Jagathy Sreekumar as Achu
- Riza Bava as Ramu
- Babu Antony as Charlie
- Krishnan Kutty Nair as Panikkar
- Mamukkoya as Aimutty Koya
- A. C. Zainuddin as Chellappan
- Bobby Kottarakkara as Sathyan
- Mala Aravindan as Anthappan

== Soundtrack ==
- "Manimegham" – K. S. Chithra
- "Pranaya Manthra" – K J Yesudas, K. S. Chithra
- "Unni Pirannal" – K J Yesudas, Sujatha Mohan
