= Aaraattu (2022 film) =

2022 film by B. Unnikrishnan

Neyyattinkara Gopante Aaraattu
- Theatrical release poster
- Directed by: B. Unnikrishnan
- Written by: Udaykrishna
- Produced by: RD Illuminations; MPM Group
- Starring: Mohanlal; Shraddha Srinath; Ramachandra Raju; Siddique
- Cinematography: Vijay Ulaganath
- Edited by: Shameer Muhammed
- Music by: Rahul Raj
- Production companies: RD Illuminations; Hippo Prime Motion Pictures; MPM Group
- Distributed by: RD Illuminations
- Release date: 18 February 2022
- Running time: 166 minutes
- Country: India
- Language: Malayalam
- Budget: ₹18 crore
- Box office: ₹20 crore

Aaraattu (lit. 'Sacred dip'; transl. Grand festival) also marketed as Neyyattinkara Gopante Aaraattu (transl. Neyyanttinkara Gopan's Grand Festival), is a 2022 Indian Malayalam-language action comedy film co-produced and directed by B. Unnikrishnan and written by Udaykrishna. The film stars Mohanlal with Shraddha Srinath, Ramachandra Raju, Siddique, Vijayaraghavan, Saikumar, and Nedumudi Venu in supporting roles. Rahul Raj composed the film's original songs and background score.

The film was released on 18 February 2022, and received negative reviews from critics who criticized the direction and poor storyline.

== Plot ==
In Muthalakotta, a village in Palakkad, people are financially recovering from the 2018 floods through gaining self-sufficiency via numerous farming ventures. Four youngsters and an elderly person arrive at the village during the flood and help them. Following the flood, the group decides to stay back in the village. They take over the majority of the farming from the villagers and start an ashram for yoga and spiritual practices. With the new state government mandate of turning any empty and unused land into farming land, the villagers, along with the RDO officer Anjali, beseech the wealthiest man in the village, Edathala Mathai, to give his 18-acre land to the government.

To avoid losing the plot and to start a township by changing the land category, he decides to lease his property to the slick Neyyattinkara Gopan, who plans to level the land under the guise of fish farming. However, Gopan is revealed to be actually siding with the villagers. He helps the villagers in farming which angers Mathai, and is involved in helping villagers solve their problems. Mathai sends goons to thrash Gopan, but he thrashes them. Gopan exposes Mathai's involvement in money laundering, hawala scams. Mathai's sons questions Sathyasheelan, who introduced them to Gopan and reveals that Gopan's real name is Colonel Suryachandra Lal who is an officer from the Military Intelligence, who had lost his parents when they were killed in a train journey by Muthalakotta Battalion (4 youngsters and Guruji), who are involved in many crimes.

The Muthalakotta Battalion arrived at Muthalakotta with a fake identity in order to save themselves. After the revelation, The youngsters kill Sathyasheelan. Gopan conducts a show with A. R. Rahman as the chief guest, where he defeats the group and gets them arrested by the NIA. The youngsters and Guruji are killed in a shootout conducted by the NIA. Soon, a cop reveals that Gopan is not Suryachandra Lal and that the actual Suryachandra Lal is in army hospital undergoing treatment for depression. Gopan is then revealed to be a high-profile secret agent codenamed Agent X who works for the Central Home Department and participates in many secret missions with many different identities.

== Cast ==
- Mohanlal as Gaanabhushanam Neyyattinkara Gopan / Colonel Suryachandralal / Agent X
- Shraddha Srinath as RDO Anjali T. R
- Ramachandra Raju as Bada Raju
- Siddique as CI Sivasankaran
- Vijayaraghavan as Edathala Mathai
- Saikumar as Sathyasheelan
- Nedumudi Venu as Sreedharan Master
- K. B. Ganesh Kumar as SP Satheesh kumar IPS
- Neha Saxena as Swapna / NIA officer Arundhati Pathak
- Rachana Narayanankutty as Rugmini
- Nandu as Narayana Pillai, Panchayat President
- Johny Antony as Adv. Vettickal Sasi, Mathai's Legal Advisor
- Maya Vishwanath as Deepa
- Kottayam Ramesh as Kumarji / Shankar Vasudev, Hard-core Criminal
- Ashwin Kkumar as Ayyappan aka Shiva
- Prasanth Alexander as Thankachan, Panchayath Member
- Riyaz Khan as Damodaran "Damodarji"
- Baiju Ezhupunna as Rambo, Gopan's Bodyguard / NIA Officer
- Biju Pappan as Edathala Baby
- Rony David as Edathala Babu
- Santhosh Keezhattoor as SP Ramdas IPS
- Swasika as Balan's daughter
- Malavika Menon as Balan's daughter
- Ramu as DGP Santhosh Menon IPS
- Indrans as Tabalist Balan / Balettan
- Shivaji Guruvayoor as Revenue Minister Rajendran
- Kochu Preman as Hari, Panchayath Opposition Leader
- Anjali Nair as District Collector Fathima
- Tanvi Ram as Commissioner's Daughter (Cameo)
- Sminu Sijo as Damodaran's wife
- Sreejith Ravi as SI Vishwambharan
- Pradeep Kottayam as Krishnan, Temple Priest
- Ravikumar as Raghavan, Suryachandra Lal's father
- Seetha as Janaki, Suryachandra Lal's mother
- Gaadha as Subhadra, Sreedharan Master's Granddaughter
- Sadhika Venugopal as Sushama, Edathala Baby's Wife
- Meera Nair as Julie, Edathala Babu's Wife
- Lukman Avaran as Rocky
- Anoop Davis as Rishi
- Roshan Chandra as Kishore
- Sharik Khan as Sameer, Shiva's team mate
- Nandhu Pothuval as Balu, Revenue Minister's Personal Assistant
- Biju Menon as Colonel Suryachandra Lal (original) (photo presence)

=== Cameo appearances ===
- A. R. Rahman as Himself (cameo)
- Antony Perumbavoor as Himself (cameo)
- Dhruvan as Sreedharan Master's son (cameo)
- Udaykrishna as Himself (cameo)
- Sivamani as Himself (cameo)
- V. K. Sreeraman as TV show Anchor (cameo)
- Kalamandalam Gopi as Himself (cameo)
- Prabhakar as Durga Reddy (cameo)
- Anarkali Nazar (cameo)

== Production ==
=== Development ===
In May 2020, director B. Unnikrishnan shared a picture of him having a meeting with screenwriter Udaykrishna, cinematographer Vijay Ulaganath, editor Shameer Muhammed and some technical crew for revealing that they are in the pre-production work of a film amid the COVID-19 lockdown in India. In October, it was revealed that Mohanlal would play the leading role in the film which has a rustic story where he plays the role of a villager. Filming was said to begin in mid-November after Mohanlal completes filming of Drishyam 2. The film marks the first collaboration between Unnikrishnan and Udaykrishna. Unnikrishnan said that he, Mohanlal, and Udaykrishnan were originally working on another project with a dark subject. Its final discussion were going on before the shoot of Drishyam 2, but with surging COVID-19 cases it became near impossible to shoot the film at that time which required to be shot at multiple locations. It was then Mohanlal suggested that they work on a "festive kind of film" as a change against the increasing number of darker films produced during that time and Udaykrishna developed a story that shaped into Aaraattu.

Unnikrishnan said that ₹30 lakh will be allotted for COVID-19 precautions, and the film would have a larger than usual crew by COVID-19 pandemic standards, which would take 60 days to shoot. Cast and crew agreed to work with a reduced remuneration considering the COVID-19 crisis. Unnikrishnan said that, in a normal scenario the film would have cost ₹30 crore. Title of the film was announced in November 2020. Vijay Ulaganath was reported as the cinematographer. The film was produced by the production houses RD Illuminations, Hippo Prime Motion Pictures, and Movie Pay Media's.

=== Casting ===
Aaraattu was Unnikrishnan's first film to feature as many as 45 characters. Mohanlal plays Neyyattinkara Gopan, whom Unnikrishnan describes as a "loud character from the get-go". Mohanlal was confirmed in the film in October 2020. In the same month, Shraddha Srinath was confirmed in the female lead role, who plays an I.A.S officer serving as Revenue Division Officer. Shraddha was acting in a Malayalam film after a break of five years. Ramachandra Raju was confirmed in January 2021.

=== Filming ===
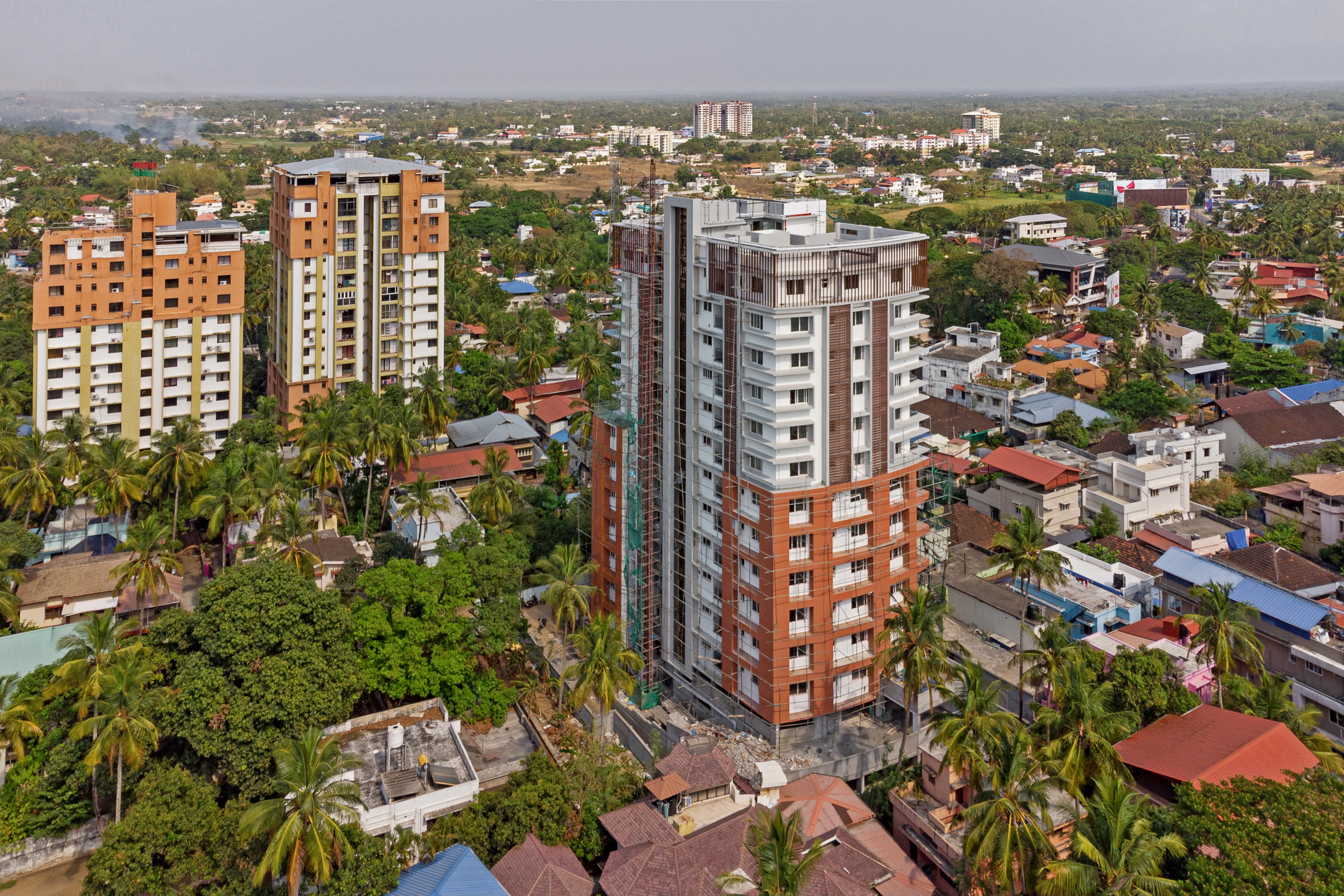
Integral portions of the film were shot in Palakkad district.

The crew planned to shoot the film in Palakkad and Hyderabad. Vijay Ulaganath was the cinematographer. The filming was done following the COVID-19 protocols and safety measures. The film began principal photography on 23 November 2020 in Palakkad district. Shraddha Srinath joined the set on the following day. Varikkasseri Mana served as a location for the film. Some significant portions were shot at Ottapalam and Ooty. The two day shoot at the Palakkad Town railway station costs ₹23.46 lakhs for renting six coaches from Indian Railways. Mohanlal's character drives a vintage black Mercedes-Benz 300SEL 6.3 with 2255 on the number plate, a reference to Mohanlal's iconic line from his 1986 film Rajavinte Makan. Mohanlal completed his portion by 11 February 2021, with one day shoot left to be shot in March second week. Composer A. R. Rahman appeared in a song sequence along with Mohanlal in March. It was filmed at Chennai. Filming was completed in late March 2021.

== Music ==
Aaraattu

Soundtrack album by Rahul Raj
- Released: 2022
- Recorded: 2021
- Genre: Feature film soundtrack
- Label: Saina
- Producer: Rahul Raj

Rahul Raj chronology
| Marakkar: Lion of the Arabian Sea (2021) | Aaraattu (2022) | Thaaram |

The original songs and background score of the film were composed by Rahul Raj. Lyrics were written by B. K. Harinarayanan, Rajeev Govindan, Fejo, and Nikesh Chembilode. A. R. Rahman has done a cameo and performed a song in the film. Unnikrishnan said that it was difficult to hire Rahman for the film since he rarely appears in films. He appears in a pivotal portion in the film. The final mix of the film was going on in November 2021.

| No. | Title | Lyrics | Singer(s) | Length |
|---|---|---|---|---|
| 1. | "Onnam Kandam Keri" | Rajeev Govindan | Swetha Ashok, Narayani Gopan, Yasin Nizar, Mithun Jayaraj, Aswin Vijayan, Rajkumar Radhakrishnan | 3:53 |
| 2. | "Thalayude Vilayaattu" | Fejo, Harinarayanan B.K. | Fejo, M. G. Sreekumar | 4:01 |
| 3. | "Thaaruzhiyum" | Nikesh Chembilode | K. S. Harisankar, Poornasree | 4:46 |
| 4. | "Neeharam Pozhiyum" | Harinarayanan B.K. | M. G. Sreekumar | 4:57 |
| 5. | "Muqaala Muqabla (Remix)" | A. R. Rahman | A.R. Rahman | 5:00 |
| Total length: | | | | 21:47 |

== Release ==
Aaraattu was released worldwide theatrically on 18 February 2022. Originally scheduled for 20 August 2021, the premiere was postponed due to closure of theatres in Kerala because of COVID-19 pandemic in India. Then, the film's release date was pushed to 13 October 2021, but it was again postponed due to the same reason. It was then moved to 10 February 2022, but delayed again.

== Reception ==
=== Critical response ===
Sanjith Sidhardhan of OTTplay gave 3 out of 5 stars and wrote "All-out Mohanlal show works only when it doesn't take itself too seriously" The Times of India rated the film 3 out of 5 stars and wrote "Aaraattu is not a clever film, but if you are looking for a 'return to the theatre' family entertainer, this might serve your purpose." The New Indian Express gave 3 out of 5 stars and called the film test." Malayala Manorama called the movie "a charade of old master pieces" referring to the references to old Malayalam movies of Mohanlal. The Week gave 2.5 out of 5 stars and called it "unoriginal mish-mash of classic 'Mohanlal moments' and tropes. Sowmya Rajendran of The News Minute gave 1.5 out of 5 stars and called it "loud, bombastic and boring."
