= Sandhya Mohan =

Indian film director

- Born: Kerala, India
- Occupation: Film director
- Years active: 1986–present

Sandhya Mohan is an Indian film director who mostly works in the Malayalam film industry. He is known for his comedy genre films such as My Dear Karadi (1999) and Kilukkam Kilukilukkam (2006).

== Career ==
Sandhya Mohan's debut movie was Ilanjippookkal, which was released in 1986. In 1987, he directed and co-wrote the movie Onnaam Maanam Poomaanam. His movies Hitler Brothers and Amma Ammaayiyamma were comedy movies.

Mr. Marumakan, a comedy-drama film, starring Dileep, brought recognition to Mohan, and assisted him with plans to make Central Jayile Pretham, starring Indian actress Tamannaah.

== Filmography ==
Year	Film	Writer	Notes	Ref.
1986	Ilanjippookkal	Ignetius Kalayanthani		
1987	Onnaam Maanam Poomaanam	John Paul	Co-written with Sandhya Mohan	
1993	Sowbhagyam	Kaloor Dennis		
1996	Pallivaathukkal Thommichan	Himself		
1997	Hitler Brothers	Udaykrishna Sibi K.Thomas		
1998	Amma Ammaayiyamma	Udaykrishna Sibi K.Thomas		
1999	My Dear Karadi	Udaykrishna Sibi K.Thomas		
2006	Kilukkam Kilukilukkam	Udaykrishna Sibi K.Thomas		
2012	Mr. Marumakan	Udaykrishna Sibi K.Thomas		
