= Kilukkam Kilukilukkam =

- Theatrical release poster
- Directed by: Sandhya Mohan
- Written by: Udayakrishna-Siby K. Thomas
- Produced by: P. K. Muraleedharan; Paul Robinson
- Starring: Kunchacko Boban; Jayasurya; Kavya Madhavan; Jagathy Sreekumar
- Cinematography: Saloo George
- Edited by: K. Rajagopal
- Music by: Deepak Dev; Score: S. P. Venkatesh
- Distributed by: Aroma Cinemas
- Release date: 3 May 2006
- Running time: 152 minutes
- Country: India
- Language: Malayalam

Kilukkam Kilukilukkam (transl. Jingle, and more jingle) is a 2006 Indian Malayalam-language romantic comedy film directed by Sandhya Mohan and written by Udayakrishna-Siby K. Thomas. It is a sequel to the 1991 film Kilukkam. The film stars a new cast of Kunchacko Boban, Jayasurya, and Kavya Madhavan while Jagathy Sreekumar and Innocent reprised their roles from the original and Mohanlal appears in an extended cameo role. Mammukoya reprises his role as Gafoor Ka Dosth from Nadodikkattu.

== Plot ==
Chandini sees her father, Krishnadas, Mayor of Kochi, being killed by the rivals, but manages to escape from them and comes to Ooty. The needle of suspicion falls on Roychan and his friend, Appachan. So they move to Ooty to escape. Meanwhile, Balu and Ponnappan see a piece of missing child information and go to Ooty expecting her parents to give them money. Nischal, captivated by the beauty of Chandini, is also in Ooty trying to impress her. Meanwhile, Chandini goes missing. The rest of the story is about how Joji gets involved and leads the team to trace and save Chandini.

== Cast ==
- Mohanlal as Joji (extended cameo appearance)
- Kunchacko Boban as Roy
- Jayasurya as Balu
- Kavya Madhavan as Chandni / Thilothama, Joji's Foster Sister
- Jagathy Sreekumar as Nischal, Still Photographer and Joji's Friend
- Nayanthara Chakravarthy as Tinku / Tinkumol
- Innocent as Kittunni / Vasundhara Devi
- Salim Kumar as Appachan / Nun, Roy's Friend
- Harisree Ashokan as Ponnappan / Fr. Cyriac, Balu's Friend
- Cochin Haneefa as Appukuttan / Annamma, Nischal's Friend
- Captain Raju as Colonel Panicker, Chandni's Real Father
- Vijayaraghavan as Mayor Krishnadas, Chandni's Foster Father
- Janardhanan as SI Sankaran Potti
- Adithya Menon as Shivachandra Panicker, Tinkumol's Father
- Baburaj as Vishnu, Shivachandra Panicker's Friend and Partner
- Bindu Panicker as Nun
- Sharat Saxena as Samar Khan
- Indrans as House Broker Bakkar
- Guinness Pakru as Neelagiri Neelakandan, Appukuttan's Friend
- Sadiq as Balaji, Balu and Ponnappan's Friend
- Suja Karthika as Devi, Colonel Panicker's Foster Daughter
- Jeeja Surendran as Bharathi, Colonel Panicker's Wife
- Mamukkoya as Gafoor Ka Dosth (Reprising His Role From Nadodikkattu)
- Revathi as Nandini, Joji's Wife (Voice Presence and Archive Footage)
- Thilakan as Justice Pillai (Archive Footage)
- Murali as Adv. Dasharathan (Archive Footage)

It also features cameo-esque footage of some actors involved in Priyadarshan's film Chup Chup Ke, during the pre-opening scene of the film—Shahid Kapoor, Kareena Kapoor, Sunil Shetty, and Shakti Kapoor.

== Production ==
The film is a sequel to the 1991 film Kilukkam directed by Priyadarshan. It was earlier titled Angamaliyile Pradhanamanthri based on a dialogue from Kilukkam.

== Soundtrack ==
The film's soundtrack contains four songs, and the lyrics were written by Bichu Thirumala and Gireesh Puthenchery.

No.	Title	Composer	Singer(s)
1	"Kilukilppamparam (Resung from Kilukkam)"	S. P. Venkatesh	M. G. Sreekumar
2	"Kilukkam Kilukilukkam"	Deepak Dev	Vineeth Sreenivasan, Chorus
3	"Kilukilukkam Kilukilukkam"	Deepak Dev	M. G. Sreekumar, K. S. Chitra
4	"Innoru Paattonnu Paadaan"	Deepak Dev	Ranjith Govind, Benny Dayal, Smitha, Arjun Sasi

== Reception ==
A critic from Nowrunning wrote that "Over all, the film is nothing to write home about". A critic from Indiaglitz wrote that "Kilukkam, the film's parent of sorts, was a milestone in Malayalam cinema. But Kilukkam Kilukilukkam is almost a farce with mindless burlesque and silly caricaturing". Despite received negative reviews, the film was a commercial success.
