= Jose Thomas =

Indian film director in Malayalam movies (born 1965

- Born: Jose Thomas Moonukandathil; July 30, 1963 (age 63); Thiruvananthapuram, India
- Occupation: director
- Years active: 1986
- Spouse: Sindhu Jose Thomas(m:1994)
- Children: 2

Jose Thomas is an Indian film director in Malayalam movies. He directed more than 20 Malayalam movies. His popular movies are Mattupetti Machan, Kanjirapally Kariyachan, Udayapuram Sulthan, Mayamohini and Sringaravelan.

== Filmography ==
Director

Film	Year	Cast
Ente Sreekuttikku	1993	Mukesh, Thilakan, Maathu
Njaan Kodeeshwaran	1994	Jagadish, Vinodini, Sudheesh
Saadaram	1995	Suresh Gopi, Geetha, Lalu Alex
Kanjirappally Kariyachan	1996	Janardanan, Vijayaraghavan, Biju Menon, Maathu
Adivaram	1997	Vijayaraghavan, Murali, Charmila
Meenakshi Kalyanam	1998	Mukesh, Mohini, Jagathy Sreekumar, Kalabhavan Navas
Mattupetti Machan	1998	Mukesh, Baiju, Jagathy Sreekumar, Oduvil Unnikrishnan, Maathu, Sreelakshmi
Udayapuram Sulthan	1999	Dileep, Preetha Vijaykumar, Captain Raju, Narendra Prasad, Innocent
Tokyo Nagarathile Viseshangal	1999	Mukesh, Vijayaraghavan, Maathu, Jagathy Sreekumar
Sundarapurushan	2001	Suresh Gopi, Mukesh, Devayani, Nandini.
Snehithan	2002	Kunchacko Boban, Krishna, Preetha Vijayakumar, Nandana.
Youth Festival	2004	Aby Kunjumon, Sidharth Bharathan, Bhavana, Meenakshi
Chirattakkalippaattangal	2005	Mukesh, Rajan P Dev, Cochin Haneefa
Mayamohini	2012	Dileep, Biju Menon, Mohan Sharma, Baburaj, Mythili
Sringaravelan	2013	Dileep, Vedhika, Lal, Joy Mathew, Kalabhavan Shajohn, Baburaj, Shammi Thilakan
Swarna Kaduva	2016	Biju Menon, Innocent, Iniya, Hareesh Perumanna
