= Dileep filmography =

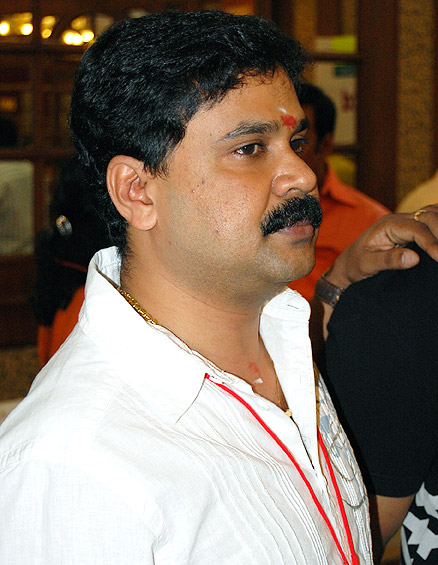
Dileep in 2008

Dileep is an Indian actor, playback singer, and producer who predominantly works in the Malayalam films. He has acted in more than 150 Malayalam films.

== Filmography ==
=== Actor ===
Key
†	Denotes films that have not yet been released

List of Dileep acting credits
Year	Title	Role	Notes
1992	Ennodishtam Koodamo	Dileep	
1992	Aayushkalam	Ghost	Uncredited
1994	Sudhinam	Raghu	
1994	Sainyam	Cadet Thomas ''Kokku' / Thomachan	
1994	Pidakkozhi Koovunna Noottandu	Kishore	
1994	Sagaram Sakshi	Krishnakumar's Son	Uncredited
1994	Manathe Kottaram	Dileep	
1995	Thirumanassu	Kuttan	Cameo appearance
1995	Vrudhanmare Sookshikkuka	Sathyaraj / K G Nair	
1995	Three Men Army	Muthukulam Madhukumar	
1995	Ezharakkootam	Ara	
1995	Alanchery Thambrakal	Unni	
1995	Kakkakkum Poochakkum Kalyanam	Kunjananthan	
1995	Kokkarakko	Prakashan	
1995	Sindoora Rekha	Ambujakshan	
1996	Kalyana Sowgandhikam	Jayadeva Sharma	
1996	Padanayakan		
1996	Kudumbakkodathi	Rameshan Nair	
1996	Malayala Masam Chingam Onnu	Preman	
1996	Manthrika Kuthira	Premgandhi (Josekutty)	
1996	Saamoohyapadam	Vishnu	
1996	Swapna Lokathe Balabhaskaran	Kesavankutty	
1996	Thooval Kottaram	Rameshchandra Pothuval	
1996	Sallaapam	Sasikumar	
1996	Ee Puzhayum Kadannu	Gopi	
1997	Ullasappoonkattu	Unni	
1997	Manthramothiram	Kumaran	
1997	Varnappakittu	Pullankunnel Paulachan	
1997	Kudamaattam	Appukuttan	
1997	Kalyanapittannu	E. Rajeev	
1997	Maanasam	Solomon / Appu	
1997	Kaliyoonjal	Venu	
1997	Maayapponman	Prasad	
1997	Nee Varuvolam	Hari	
1998	Meenathil Thalikettu	Omanakkuttan	
1998	Kaikkudanna Nilavu	Kichamani	
1998	Vismayam	Dinakaran	
1998	Anuragakottaram	Charles Jr	
1998	Ormacheppu	Radhakrishnan	
1998	Punjabi House	Unnikrishnan	
1998	Kallu Kondoru Pennu	Venu	
1998	Manthri Maalikayil Manasammatham	Alex	Extended Cameo appearance
1998	Sundarakilladi	Premachandran / Sundarakilladi	
1999	Megham	Manikantan	
1999	Chandranudikkunna Dikhil	Mukundan	
1999	Deepasthambham Mahascharyam	Mundoor Ramanandan Nambyar	
1999	Pranaya Nilavu	Kannan	
1999	Udayapuram Sulthan	Sulaiman	
2000	Mister Butler	Gopalakrishnan	
2000	Varnakkazhchakal	Kunju	
2000	Joker	Babu	
2000	Darling Darling	Karthik	
2000	Thenkasipattanam	Shathrughnan	
2001	Dhosth	Ajith	
2001	Ee Parakkum Thalika	Unnikrishnan / Thamarakshan Pilla	
2001	Rakshasa Rajavu	Appu	
2001	Ishtam	Pavan K. Menon	
2001	Soothradharan	Rameshan	
2002	Mazhathullikkilukkam	Solomon	
2002	Kuberan	Siddharthan	
2002	Raajjiyam	Surya	Tamil film
2002	Meesa Madhavan	Madhavan Nair	
2002	Kunjikoonan	Vimal Kumar (Kunjan) and Prasad	
2002	Kalyanaraman	Ramankutty	
2003	Thilakkam	Unni / Vishnu	
2003	Sadanandante Samayam	Sadanandan	
2003	Gramaphone	Sachidanandan	
2003	C.I.D. Moosa	Moolamkuzhiyil Sahadevan / CID Moosa	Also producer
2003	Mizhi Randilum	Krishnakumar	
2003	War and Love	Captain Gopinath	
2003	Pattanathil Sundaran	Sundareshan	
2004	Runway	Unni Damodar / Valayar Paramashivam	
2004	Thekkekkara Superfast	Benny Pukkattuparambil	
2004	Vettam	Gopalakrishnan	
2004	Kathavasheshan	Gopinath	Also producer
2004	Perumazhakkalam	Akbar	Extended cameo appearance
2004	Rasikan	Shivankutty	
2005	Kochi Rajavu	Unni / Surya Narayana Varma	
2005	Pandippada	Bhuvanachandran	Also producer
2005	Chanthupottu	Radhakrishnan	
2006	Lion	B.Krishnakumar	
2006	Pachakuthira	Anandakuttan Menon / Anand and Akash Menon	
2006	Chess	Vijayakrishnan	
2006	The Don	Unnikrishnan (Salaam)	
2006	Chakkara Muthu	Aravindan	
2007	Inspector Garud	Madhavankutty	
2007	Speed Track	Arjun	
2007	Vinodayathra	Vinod	
2007	July 4	Gokul Das	
2007	Romeo	Manukrishnan, Manual, Supramani	
2008	Calcutta News	Ajith Thomas	
2008	Mulla	Mulla	
2008	Twenty:20	Karthik Varma	Cameo appearance; Also producer
2008	Crazy Gopalan	Gopalan	
2008	Naale		Unreleased film
2009	Colours	Sanjay Nath	
2009	Moz & Cat	Moz.D.Samuel	
2009	Passenger	Nandan Menon	
2009	Kerala Cafe	Johnykutty	Anthology film; Segment: Nostalgia
2009	Swantham Lekhakan	Unni Madhavan	
2010	Body Guard	Jayakrishnan	
2010	Aagathan	Gautham Menon	
2010	Paappi Appacha	Nirappel Paappi	
2010	Toofan	Charan Laathi	Hindi film; completed in 1999
2010	Kaaryasthan	Krishnanunni	100th Film
2010	Marykkundoru Kunjaadu	Kunjadu Solomon	
2011	The Metro	Narrator / Himself	Cameo appearance; Also producer
2011	Christian Brothers	Joji Varghese Mapilla	Extended cameo appearance
2011	China Town	Binoy	
2011	The Filmstaar	Nandagopan	
2011	Orma Mathram	Ajay	
2011	Vellaripravinte Changathi	Mukkom Shajahan / Ravi	Kerala State Film Award for Best Actor
2012	Spanish Masala	Charlie	
2012	Mayamohini	Mayamohini / Mohanakrishnan	
2012	Arike	Shanthanu	
2012	Mr. Marumakan	Advocate Ashok Raj / Ashok Chakravarthy	
2012	My Boss	Manu Varma	
2013	Proprietors: Kammath & Kammath	Deva Raja Kammath	
2013	Sound Thoma	Plapparambil Thoma	
2013	Kadal Kadannoru Mathukkutty	Himself	Cameo appearance
2013	Sringaravelan	Kannan	
2013	Nadodimannan	Padmanabhan	
2013	Ezhu Sundara Rathrikal	Aby Mathews	
2014	Ring Master	Prince	
2014	Avatharam	Madhavan Mahadevan	
2014	Villali Veeran	Sidharthan	
2015	Ivan Maryadaraman	Raman	
2015	Chandrettan Evideya	Chandramohan, Velkozhukottuvan	Dual role
2015	Love 24x7	Roopesh Nambiar	Also producer
2015	Life of Josutty	Josutty	
2015	Vajrakaya	Hanuman devotee	Kannada film; Special appearance in the song "Vajrakaya"
2015	Two Countries	Ullas	
2016	King Liar	Sathyanarayanan	
2016	Pinneyum	Purushothaman (Based on Sukumara Kurup)	
2016	Welcome to Central Jail	Unnikuttan	
2017	Georgettan's Pooram	George	
2017	Ramaleela	Ramanunni	
2017	Aana Alaralodalaral	Sekharankutty / Kunjikhadar	Voiceover
2018	Kammara Sambhavam	Kammaran Nambiar and Himself	Dual role
2018	Savaari	Himself	Cameo appearance
2019	Kodathi Samaksham Balan Vakeel	Adv. Balakrishnan	
2019	Subharathri	Krishnan	
2019	Jack & Daniel	Jack	
2019	My Santa	Santa Claus (Abel Abraham Thekkan)	
2021	Keshu Ee Veedinte Nadhan	Keshavan (Keshu), himself and Keshavan (Keshu's father)	Disney+ Hotstar release
2022	Thattassery Koottam	Iqbal	Cameo appearance; Also producer
2023	Voice Of Sathyanathan	Sathyanathan	
2023	Bandra	Alan "Ala" Alexander Dominic	
2024	Thankamani	Abel Joshua Maathan	
2024	Pavi Caretaker	Pavithran	Also producer
2025	Prince and Family	Prince	
2025	Bha Bha Ba	Ram Damodar "Radar"	
2026	Neekkam †	TBA	
2027	Henok †	Dr. Leo Thomas	

== Other Works ==
=== Assistant director ===
- Pookkalam Varavayi (1991)
- Vishnu Lokam (1991)
- Ulladakkam (1991)
- Champakulam Thachan (1992)
- Ennodishtam Koodamo (1992)
- Ghazal (1993)
- Bhoomi Geetham (1993)
- Mazhayethum Munpe (1995)
- Ee Puzhayum Kadannu (1996)
- Manthramothiram (1997)

=== Producer ===
- C.I.D. Moosa (2003)
- Kadhavasheshan (2004)
- Pandippada (2005)
- Twenty:20 (2008)
- Malarvaadi Arts Club (2010)
- The Metro (2011)
- Love 24x7 (2015)
- Kattappanayile Rithwik Roshan (2016)
- Keshu Ee Veedinte Nadhan (2021)
- Thattassery Koottam (2022)
- Voice of Sathyanathan (2023)
- Pavi Caretaker (2024)
- Parakkum Pappan (TBA)

=== Television ===
- Comicola (Asianet) Lead role
- Cinemala (Asianet) as Lead role
- Dhe Chef (Mazhavil Manorama) as Guest
- Comedy Mamankam (Asianet) as Himself in 2 episodes
- Aram + Aram - Kinnaram (Surya TV) as Guest
- Bigg Boss (Malayalam season 6) (Asianet) as Guest
- Super Show (Zee Keralam) as Anchor
- Nayanthara: Beyond the Fairytale as Himself

=== Playback singing ===
List of film playback singing credits
Song	Film	Year	Lyrics	Composer
"Theme Music"	Chandranudikkunna Dikhil	1999	S. Ramesan Nair	Vidyasagar
"Onnaam Malakerii"	Kalyanaraman	2002	Kaithapram Damodaran	Berny-Ignatius
"Saare Saare"	Thilakkam	2003	Kaithapram Damodaran	Kaithapram Damodaran
"Kandaal Njaanoru"	Sound Thoma	2013	Nadirshah	Gopi Sunder
"Ashakoshale Pennundo"	Sringaravelan	2013	Nadirshah	Berny-Ignatius
"Naranga Mittayi"	Keshu Ee Veedinte Nadhan	2021	Nadirshah	Nadirshah
