= Delsy Ninan =

Indian playback singer

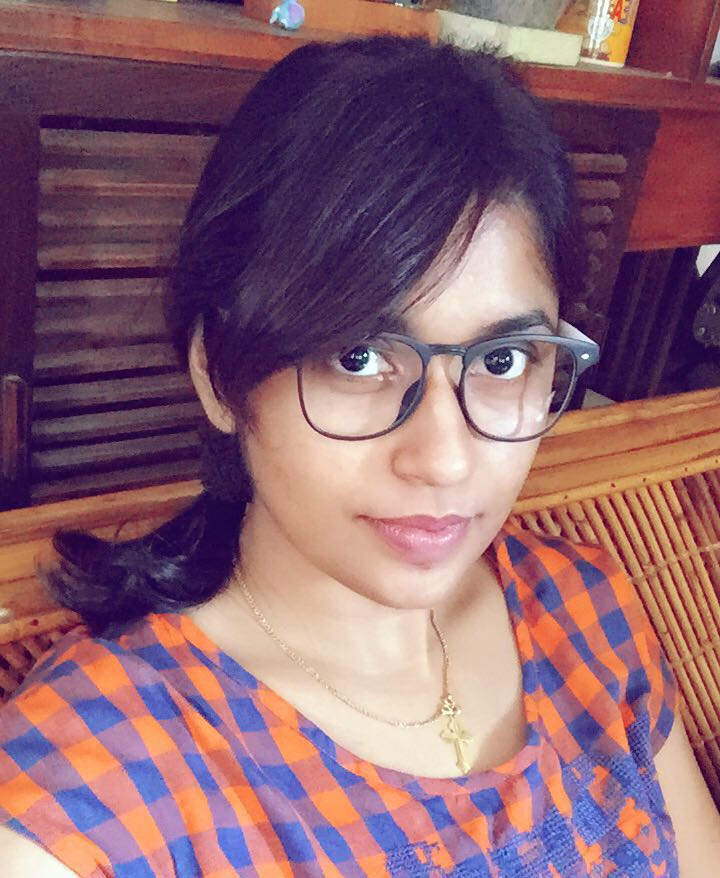

Background information
- Also known as: Thampu Delsy Ninan

Delsy Ninan is an Indian playback singer and video jockey from Kerala.

== Early life ==
Ninan did her schooling in Pathanamthitta. She attended BCM College, Kottayam, where her musical side was recognized and encouraged by her friends. Later on it was music director Sunny Viswanath who recognized her talent and introduced her into playback singing.

== Career ==
Ninan started her career through the live show "Naalumani Pookkal" which was aired on Jeevan TV. Her first appearance in a band was through "GirlzBand" in Asianet. She was also part of "Star Band" which was the official band of the show Star Wars in Kairali TV. Her biggest break as a VJ came to her in 2014, when she anchored the super hit show "Surya Singer" in Surya TV which brought her huge recognition among the public as well as professional circles alike. She has performed in the super hit TV show Music Mojo in Kappa TV. She has also rendered many Jingles and has been featured in various brand adverts. She has also recorded as well as performed in various stage shows with prominent artists in India as well as USA, Canada, UK, Australia, UAE, South Africa, Indonesia, Bahrain, Doha and Kuwait.

=== Career in Playback ===
Ninan's playback singing career started off with the movie "Isra" in 2005, songs of which were composed by Sunny Viswanath. She rendered two songs in the movie. The following year music director Jassie Gift utilized her voice in two of his songs, of which the song "Neelathadagangalo" (Balram vs Tharadas) went on to become a very noted song. She also rendered two songs for the veteran music director Raghu Kumar for the movie Subhadram, of which the song "Swapnangale" was a duet with the legendary singer P. Jayachandran. In 2008, she ventured into Telugu playback through the movie 'John Appa Rao 40 Plus'. The song 'Meghalalo' from the movie made it to the hit charts that particular year.

She got her big break in playback singing through the 2010 Dileep starrer Malayalam movie 'Karyasthan' in which the song "Malayalai Penne" went on to become a super hit. This also kick started her association with the music direction duo Berny-Ignatious. In 2013, she sang two songs for Berny-Ignatious of which the song "Minnaminungin vettam", from yet again a Dileep starrer movie 'Sringaravelan'; went on to become a super hit. These two hits contributed in a big way into establishing Delsy as a sought after singer among the public as well as professional musicians. In 2015 she sang her first playback in Tamil, through the movie 'Romba Nallavanda Nee'. The song "Rajini Enakku" from the movie was well appreciated. She also sang the song "Poonchola" composed by Unni Nambiar in the movie "Village guys" the same year. In 2016, through the movie Sambar she was able to sing yet another duet "Poomkathirukal" with the legend P. Jayachandran. The songs in the movie were composed by Music director Sunny Viswanath. She also rendered the theme song of the movie "The Sambar Song". The movie also set another milestone in her life, as she made her debut as a lyricist by penning two songs in the movie.

== Discography ==
Year	Film	Music	Language	Song
2005	ISRA	Sunny Viswanath	Malayalam	1.Iravupol 2.Vellithinkal Vilakkanayunnu
2006	Balram Vs Tharadas	Jassie Gift	Malayalam	Neelathadagangalo (F)
2006	Aswaroodan	Jassie Gift	Malayalam	Anthivarum
2007	Sooryakireedam	Bennet-Veetrag	Malayalam	Sneham kondoru (Slow version)
2007	Subhadram	Raghu Kumar	Malayalam	1.Swapnangale 2.Kaathil melle
2008	John Appa Rao 40 Plus	Kiran Varanasi	Telugu	Meghalalo (D)
2010	Karyasthan	Berny Ignatious	Malayalam	Malayali Penne
2013	Climax	Berny Ignatious	Malayalam	Mayangan Kazhinjilla (Solo & Duet)
2013	Sringaravelan	Berny Ignatious	Malayalam	Minnaminungin Vettam
2015	Romba Nallavanda Nee	Ram Surender	Tamil	Rajini Enakku Pudikkum (D)
2015	Village guys	Unni Nambiar	Malayalam	Poonchola
2016	Sambar	Sunny Viswanath	Malayalam	1.The Sambar Song 2.Poomkathirukal
2021	Amma Marathanalil	Shine Pulikkal	Malayalam	1.Naavooru Paattinte Viralonnu

=== Other Music ===
Album	Music director	Lyrics	Song
Sooryakanthi	Sunny Viswanath	Kaithapram	Jeevane
+2 Kaari	Muralee Krishna	Sijil Kodungalloor	Ilaveyil
Gift (Christian Devotional)	Fr. Louis Mariadas	Fr. Louis Mariadas	Minnum Thaarangal
Manaporutham (Serial)	Mohan Sithara		(Duet)
Ente Kannan	Unni Nambiar	Harinarayanan BK	Thamarakannanunni
Ente Kannan	Unni Nambiar	Suresh Damoradan	Thaane Pookkum
Thejus	Peter Cheranalloor		Karaluruki

=== As lyricist ===
Year	Film	Music director	Songs
2016	Sambar	Sunny Viswanath	1.The Sambar Song: 2. Poomkathirukal
