= Saamoohyapaadam =

Saamoohya Paadam
- Directed by: Kareem
- Written by: Joy Mathew
- Screenplay by: Joy Mathew
- Produced by: T. K. Surendran; Pradeep Chembakassery
- Starring: Dileep; Prem Kumar; Sukumari; Kalabhavan Mani
- Cinematography: Rasheed Mooppan
- Edited by: Venugopal
- Music by: S. P. Venkatesh
- Production company: Aramana Productions
- Distributed by: Aramana Productions
- Release date: 1996
- Country: India
- Language: Malayalam

Saamoohya Paadam (transl. Social Studies) is a 1996 Indian Malayalam film, directed by Kareem and produced by T. K. Surendran and Pradeep Chembakassery. The film stars Dileep, Prem Kumar, Sukumari and Kalabhavan Mani in the lead roles. The film has musical score by S. P. Venkatesh. Songs were penned by Konniyoor Balachandran ( Kavalam kiliye) and Shibu Chakravarthy.

== Cast ==
- Dileep as Vishnu
- Prem Kumar as Raghuraman
- Reshmi Soman as Sreedevi
- Keerthana as Ammu
- Kalabhavan Mani as K. K. Karunan
- Rajan P. Dev as Kunjanandan Nair
- Sukumari as Bhavaniyamma
- Mala Aravindan as Pushpangathan
- Paravoor Bharathan as Lambodaran Pilla
- Kozhikode Narayanan Nair as Swadeshi Master
- Bindu Panicker as Premalatha
- Kanakalatha as Kanakalatha
- Jose Pellissery as Lonappan
- Ravi Menon as Chandrappan
- Tony as Devan

== Soundtrack ==
The music was composed by S. P. Venkatesh.

No.	Song	Singers	Lyrics	Length (m:ss)
1	"I am Man with Golden	Mano	Shibu Chakravarthy	
2	"Kaavalam Kiliye"	K. S. Chithra	Balachandran Konniyoor	
3	"Kaavalam Kiliye"	K. J. Yesudas	Balachandran Konniyoor	
4	"Thiruvonakkili"	M. G. Sreekumar, Sujatha Mohan	Shibu Chakravarthy	
