= July 4 (film) =

- July 4 DVD cover
- Directed by: Joshiy
- Written by: Udayakrishna; Siby K. Thomas
- Produced by: Alwin Antony; Suku Nair
- Starring: Dileep; Roma Asrani; Siddique
- Cinematography: Shaji Kumar
- Edited by: Ranjan Abraham
- Music by: Ouseppachan
- Distributed by: Varnachitra Big Screen; PJ Entertainments
- Release date: 5 July 2007
- Running time: 150 minutes
- Country: India
- Language: Malayalam

July 4 is a 2007 Indian Malayalam-language suspense thriller film directed by Joshiy, written by Udayakrishna-Siby K. Thomas, starring Dileep, Siddique and Roma, while Devan, Vijayaraghavan, Innocent, Cochin Haneefa, and Riyaz Khan play supporting roles. The music was composed by Ouseppachan with cinematography by Shaji Kumar and editing by Ranjan Abraham. The film released on 5 July 2007.

== Plot ==
The story begins in a jail, where Ramachandran, a very agile policeman, takes charge as the jail superintendent. He is given a brief about the jail and the prisoners by Narayanan Potti, who is the jailer. One day Ramachandran comes face to face with Gokuldas, one of the prisoners who is to be released soon, on July 4. It is then revealed that the very reason Ramachandran had taken charge of the jail is to meet Das, with whom he has some old scores to settle. Das reveals his past to Potti.

During his childhood, Das had no one but his mother to call his own; he lived in a street and worked in a cycle shop. When he is picked up by the police along with other boys from the street for a crime he has not committed, things go berserk in his life. His mother comes to get him released but is raped and killed by the police officer in charge of the station. When Das comes out, he and friends take revenge on the police officer by strangling him and hitting him with a rock. They then flee to Mumbai, where they become criminals, constantly clashing with the cops. Things get too hot for them when a daring police officer Mohammed Usman takes charge, and they break up, with Das taking refuge in a colony at the house of Gopalan, who a kindhearted taxi driver. He gets close with Gopalan and his family, but soon the cops reach there, too. In the tussle that follows, Gopalan is killed. Das, who escapes from the cops, is filled with remorse. Later, he takes Gopalan's family and leaves Mumbai, deciding to lead a good life. He works as a taxi driver at the Coimbatore airport. One day he meets a young girl, Sreepriya, at the airport. She later travels in his car. When she urges him to speed, offering him more money, he obliges, only to hit an auto rickshaw carrying schoolchildren. Priya catches another taxi and continues on her way to meet her mother Vijayalakshmi was hospitalised after falling from the staircase. Das later turns up at Priya's house asking for compensation. Viswanathan, her father, offers him a job as a driver, and things take a new turn.

After Priya's engagement with Ramachandran's son Suresh, Das takes Priya for an examination in Coimbatore, but on the way back, they are chased by a gang of three goons, who tried to break into her bedroom the previous night. They hide in an old house in the forest. When Das meets the goons, it is revealed in a flashback that they were his friends Danny, Williams and Firoz, who helped him to kill the inspector. For saving her both from his friends, he jumps from the cliff holding her. They are saved by a Malayali named Shakthi in the forest. When both gain consciousness, Das reveals that he did all these things to fulfill a contract from Ramachandran as a retribution to him for a huge sum, which was borrowed for an operation of children of Gopalan as the auto rickshaw hit by his car was carrying a group of school kids in which they were included.

After revealing everything, they goes back to Priya's house where they meet Abu, their part-time driver. Abu reveals to them that Vijayalakshmi gained consciousness, which makes them happy but tells a shocking truth. It is later revealed that Viswanathan was actually Priya's stepfather as Vijayalakshmi married him, who is a widower, and has a daughter Shilpa from his first marriage. One day, Vijayalakshmi overhears a conversation between Viswanathan and Ramachandran, where they planned to kill Priya to retrieve the properties which was inherited in her name and make Shilpa, the inheritor. When Vijayalakshmi discovers this, Viswanathan and Ramachandran pushes her down and claims that Vijayalakshmi fell from the staircase. After regaining consciousness and revealing the entire truth to Abu, they decides to expose them to the police. Abu and Vijayalakshmi calls their close relative DIG Balachandran and tells everything, but Ramachandran picks the call. Along with Viswanathan, Ramachandran goes to hospital and kills Vijayalakshmi. Priya becomes very emotional and mourns her mother's death. She goes to see her mother for the last time but Ramachandran sees her along with Das. Ramachandran reveals the incident to Das's friends and he thinks that he betrayed them as he fell in love with Priya. Firoz tells Ramachandran to give another sum to kill Das also if he saves her. Das and Priya goes back to Shakthi and takes a shelter in the forest. One day, when Das was going to Priya, he spots his friends there. When Firoz tries to rape her, Das fights of his friends and during the fight he gets a gun which Ramachandran gave them to kill Priya. Das gets hit by Firoz on the head with a wooden log. When he tries to kill his friends, Williams tells him that there is only one bullet and they all drags the gun from Das. During the scuffle, Priya gets shot on her hand. Suddenly, the police arrives to arrest them. Realising that they have escaped, Ramachandran tells them to search and during the search Firoz goes to him. After Firoz tells that Priya has got shot and is dead, Ramachandran kills Firoz with his gun, by stating that Priya's abductors and murderers has been killed in an attack with the police. Danny and Williams witnesses Firoz getting killed and realises that Ramachandran was betraying them. The injured Das takes a jeep and goes with the unconscious Priya and escapes but meets with an accident. Danny and Williams admits them to a clinic and reveals Ramachandran's true face and Firoz's death. They immediately takes Priya and escapes in an ambulance, but gets captured by Ramachandran. A fight occurs between Das, his friends, Ramachandran and the police. During the fight, Das stabs Ramachandran and gets arrested. Danny and Williams escapes with Priya.

Back to the present, Das reveals that he got the 3 years imprisonment for stabbing Ramachandran, but the prosecution didn't prove his old cases which happened in Mumbai. He tells Potti that he loves Priya and his friends will come with her on July 4th. On July 4th, as Das goes to Ramchandran's room to sign and leave, Ramachandran attacks Das to complete his revenge. Suddenly, he spots Viswanathan, who tells him that he got Shilpa married to Suresh by stating she his the inheritor for Priya's properties. But now he feared that along with Priya they will return the properties. Ramachandran decides to kill Das, by claiming that he killed Das in self-defense when he tried to attack Ramachandran. When Das didn't fight back, Ramachandran injures himself and frames Das for it. When he tries to kill Das with his gun, Das grabs the gun, kills Ramachandran and avenges Vijayalakshmi's and Firoz's death and frames Viswanathan for it. Viswanathan is arrested and Das unites with Priya. Das's friends and Potti sees this and becomes happy.

== Cast ==
- Dileep as Gokuldas (G)
- Roma Asrani as Sreepriya Vishwanathan (Sreekutty)
- Siddique as SP Ramachandran IPS
- Devan as Viswanathan, Sree's stepfather
- Vijayaraghavan as Gopalan
- Innocent as Narayanan Potti, Jail Warden
- Cochin Haneefa as Abukka alias Abu
- Lakshmi Ramakrishnan as Vijayalakshmi Vishwanathan, Sree's mother
- Riyaz Khan as Danny, Das's friend
- Pawan as Williams, Das's friend
- Santhosh Jogi as Firoz, Das's friend
- Salim Kumar as Sakthivel/Sakthi
- Shammi Thilakan as Ripper Murugan
- Sarath Das as Suresh Ramachandran
- Sona Nair as Renuka, Das's mother
- Reshmi Boban as Sujatha, Gopalan's wife
- Mangala as Shilpa Viswanathan
- Pallavi Narayanan as Gopalan's Daughter
- Anil Murali as CI Vincent, Ramachandran's right hand man
- Chali Pala as Kannappan, Police Inspector

== Soundtrack ==
The movie features soundtrack composed by Ouseppachan, with lyrics penned by Shibu Chakravarthy.

Track #	Song	Artist(s)	Raga
1	"Kaattupoocha"	Afsal, Sayanora Philip	
2	"Kanavin Kadavathu"	Vidhu Prathap, Jyotsna Radhakrishnan	
3	"Kanavinte Kadavathu"	Jyotsna Radhakrishnan	
4	"Oru Vaakku Mindathe"	Vineeth Sreenivasan, Swetha Mohan, Chorus	Yamuna Kalyani
5	"Oru Vaakku Mindathe"	Vineeth Sreenivasan, Chorus	Yamuna Kalyani
6	"Vakamarathin"	Sayanora Philip	
7	"Vakamarathin"	M. G. Sreekumar, Sayanora Philip	

== Release and reception ==
Some films in which Dileep was cast in the lead role and released on 4 July were big successes. The list includes Ee Parakkum Thalika (2001), Meesha Madhavan (2002), C.I.D. Moosa (2003), Pandippada (2005), and Chess (2006). This film too was planned to release on 4 July 2007 and had to change to 5 July 2007, due to a court order on a complaint that the story was copied without permissions from the author.

=== Reception ===
A critic from Sify wrote that "On the whole July 4 is a 2 hours 15 minute rollercoaster ride with some thrilling moments". A critic from Nowrunning wrote that "July 4 can be termed a well-made but average kind of film that won't come close to being a must-see". On the contrary, a critic from Rediff.com rated the film two out of five stars and wrote that "Dileep in partnership with veteran director Joshiy and his trusted writers has tried to make a please-all fare, which on the contrary pleases none".

=== Box office ===
The film became a blockbuster in the box office.
