= Akhila Sasidharan =

Indian actress (born 1992)

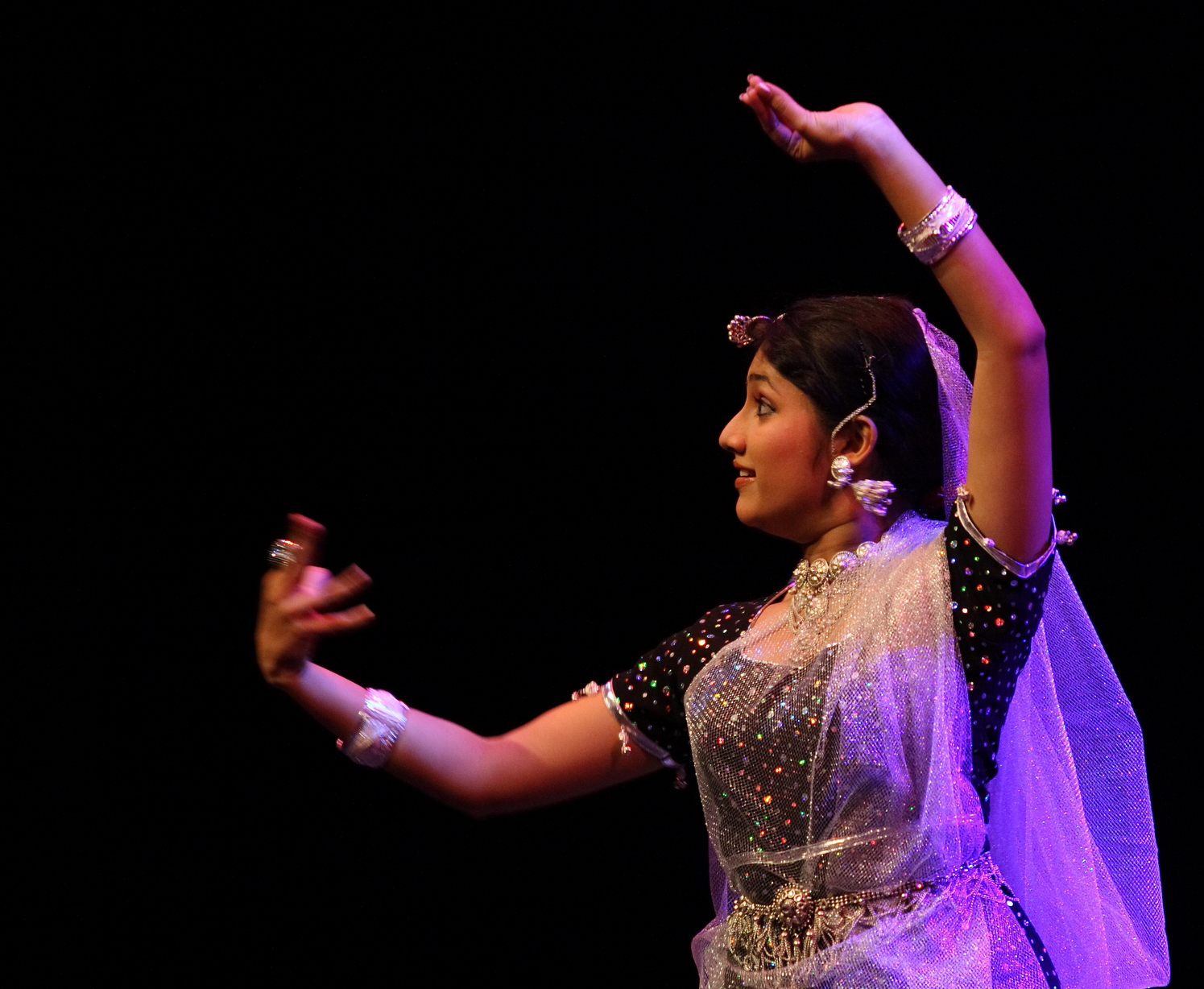
- Born: 20 March 1992 (age 34); Calicut, Kerala, India
- Occupations: Actress, Dancer
- Years active: 2008–2011

Akhila Sasidharan is an Indian actress who worked mainly in the Malayalam film industry. She made her debut with the 2010 film Kaaryasthan.

== Biography ==
Trained as a Bharatanatyam dancer, she successfully grabbed the Vodafone Thakadhimi runner-up title, a dance reality show that aired on popular Malayalam channel Asianet in 2007. Following the success of this reality show, she began hosting a music reality show on Asianet called Munch Star Singer Junior. She is also learning Kalaripayattu. She is a post-graduate in English literature.

Her acting debut was in the movie Kaaryasthan (2010), starring Dileep, which went on to become one of the highest-grossing films of the year. She played the lead character Sreebala, in the movie which was directed by Thomson. K. Thomas. Her second movie was Teja Bhai & Family, which starred Prithviraj in the lead role.

== Filmography ==
Films

No:	Year	Film	Character	Co-Actor	Director	Notes
1	2010	Karyasthan	Sreebala	Dileep	Thomson. K. Thomas	Debut Movie as Lead
2	2011	Teja Bhai & Family	Vedika Damodar	Prithviraj	Deepu Karunakaran	

Television

Year	Program	Role	Channel	Notes
2007	Vodafone Thakadhimi	Contestant	Asianet	reality show
2008-2010	Munch Star Singer junior season 1	Host	Asianet	reality show
