= Sambar (film) =

Sambar is a Malayalam movie released on 25 March 2016. The movie revolves around lives of six orphan boys, who grow up to become goons. They have led their lives doing petty thefts and crimes. One day they come across the biggest job they have ever been given, the remuneration of which is large. They decide to take up the risky job and decide to lead a normal life after getting the hefty sum. Directed by Navas Kallara, the movie was released under the banner "Three Brothers Creations" and produced by Vishnu Manohar.

== Soundtrack ==
The movie contains six sound tracks composed by Sunny Viswanath. Lyrics has been written by Harinarayanan BK & Thampu Delsy Ninan. Promo song video has been directed by Anoop Krishnan. Cinematography of promo song videos has been done by Amosh Puthiyattil (for The Sambar Song) & Sibi Manjale (for Poonkathirukal). Songs are released under the label "Paattukada Music".

1. "The Sambar Song". Singers: Delsy Ninan, Sreekanth Sasikanth, Simran Sehgal, Sreerag Ram, Praveen R. Lyrics: Delsy Ninan
2. "Oro Dhinam Oro Mukham". Singer: Chinmayi. Lyrics: Harinarayanan BK
3. "Poomkathirukal". Singers: P. Jayachandran, Delsy Ninan. Lyrics: Delsy Ninan
4. "Aakashappaalathil". Singers: Sreekanth Sasikanth, Sreerag Ram. Lyrics : Harinarayanan BK
5. "Gotta go (Addl. Eng-Hin Track)". Singers: Rahul Seth, Simran Sehgal. Lyrics: Rahul B Seth
6. "Poomkathirukal" (Reprise version). Singers: Aysha Farheen, Sreekanth Sasikanth, Sreerag Ram, Simran Sehgal. Lyrics: Delsy Ninan
