= Kunjikkuttan Thampuran (actor) =

Kerala actor (1936-2010)

Ravi Varma Kunjikkuttan Thampuran
- Born: 1936; Kerala, India
- Died: 24 August 2010 (aged 73–74)
- Occupations: Actor, Kathakali artist
- Spouse: Sathi Varma

Ravi Varma Kunjikkuttan Thampuran was a Malayalam film actor, Kathakali artist and writer.

== Biography ==
He was born in 1936, as a member of the Kochi Dynasty. He received his training in Kathakali, from Kerala Kalamandalam and has written a book Aalukal Arangukal, in which, the lives of Kathakali artists are depicted.

He has acted in more than fifty films, including several telefilms and serials. Some of his notable films are Mookkilla Rajyathu, Ulladakkam, God Father, Oridathu, Kalyana Raman and Ivory Merchant. He has also acted in a Hollywood film, Cotton Mary, which was directed by Ismail Merchant.

He was a follower of CPM and had written an Attakatha `Kurukshethra' for the sake of the party.

Thampuran died on 24 August, 2010. He was survived by his wife Sathi Varma who is the manager of Kathakali Kendram, son R. V. Vasudevan and daughter Suma Varma.
