= 42nd Kerala State Film Awards =

Annual Indian film awards ceremony

- Awarded for: Best of Malayalam Cinema in 2011
- Date: 19 July 2012
- Location: Thiruvananthapuram
- Country: India
- Presented by: Kerala State Chalachitra Academy
- First award: 1969
- Website: http://www.keralafilm.com

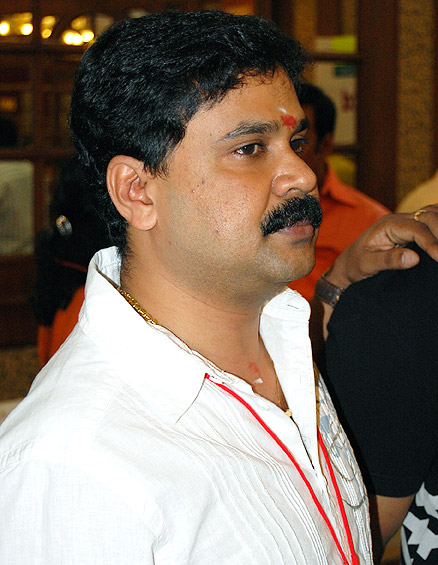
Dileep, 2008

The 42nd Kerala State Film Awards were announced and presented on 19 July 2012.

== Winners ==
Most Awards

Number of Awards	Films
4	Ivan Megharoopan
3	Akasathinte Niram, Vellaripravinte Changathi

Name of Award	Awardee(s)	Name of Film	Remarks
Best Film	Ranjith	Indian Rupee	
Second Best Film	Prakash Bare, P. Balachandran	Ivan Megharoopan	
Best Director	Blessy	Pranayam	
Best Actor	Dileep	Vellaripravinte Changathi	
Best Actress	Sweta Menon	Salt N' Pepper	
Second Best Actor	Fahadh Faasil	Chaappa Kurish, Akam	
Second Best Actress	Nilambur Ayisha	Oomakkuyil Padumbol	
Best Comedian	Jagathy Sreekumar	Swapna Sanchari	
Best Child Artist	Malavika	Oomakkuyil Padumbol	
Best Story	M. Mohanan	Manikiakkallu	
Best Cinematography	M. J. Radhakrishnan	Akasathinte Niram	
Best Screenplay	Bobby–Sanjay	Traffic	
Best Lyrics	Sreekumaran Thampi	Naayika	Nanayum Nin Mizhiyoram
Best Music Director	Sharreth	Ivan Megharoopan	All Songs
Best Male Singer	Sudheep Kumar	Rathinirvedam	Chembakapoonkavile music by jayachandran
Best Female Singer	Shreya Ghoshal	Rathinirvedam & Veeraputhran	Kannoram Chingaram & Kannodu Kannoram
Best Background Music	Deepak Dev	Urumi	
Best Film with Popular Appeal and Aesthetic Value	Aashiq Abu Sadanandan Rangorath	Salt N' Pepper	
Best Children's Film	Rajesh Kumar R	Mazhavil Niraviloode	
Best Children's Film Director	Rajesh Kumar R	Mazhavil Niraviloode	
Best Editor	Vinod Sukumaran	Ivan Megharoopan	
Best Art Director	Sujith	Naayika	
Best Sound Recordist	Rajakrishnan	Urumi & Chaappa Kurish	
Best Dubbing Artist	Vijay Menon & Praveena	Melvilasom & Ivan Megharoopan	
Best Debut Director	Sherrey	Adimadhyantham	
Best Costume Designer	Indrans Jayan	Veeraputhran	
Best Makeup Artist	Sudevan	Vellaripravinte Changathi	
Best Processing Lab	Gemini Colour Lab	Akasathinte Niram	
Best Choreography	K. Shanti	Vellaripravinte Changathi	
Best Documentary	B. Jayachandran	Travancore: A Saga of Benevolence	
Best Book on Cinema	G. P. Ramachandran	Loka Cinema Kaazhchayum Sthalakaalangalum	
Best Article on Cinema	Neelan	Elipathayam: Eli Purathum Akathum	
Special Jury Award	Biju (director)	Akasathinte Niram	Best Director
Special Jury Award	C. S. Venkiteswaran	Malayala Cinema Padanangal	Best Book on Cinema
Special Mention	Master Prajith	Adimadhyantham	

== See also ==
- National Film Awards
- Kerala State Film Award
