= Sunny Viswanath =

Indian music composer

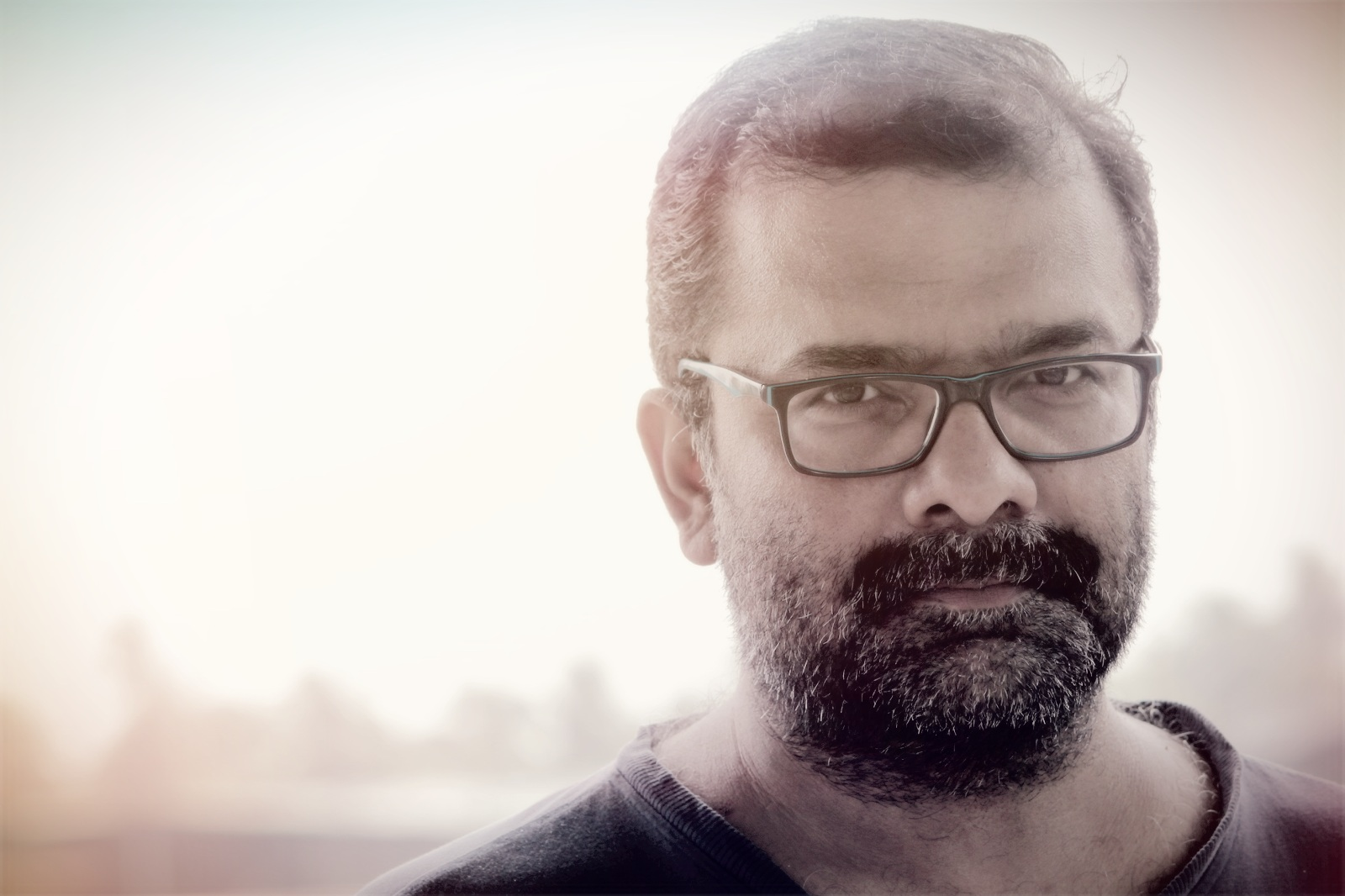
- Sunny Viswanath

Background information
- Also known as: Sunny, Sunny Viswanath
- Born: Viswanath K. N.
- Occupations: composer, record producer, music director, Event manager
- Years active: 1984–present

Sunny Viswanath (സണ്ണി വിശ്വനാഥ്, malayāḷam) is an Indian composer, music producer and event manager

== Early life ==
He started learning music at the age of 4 and performing with amateur bands since the age of 7. By the age of 14, he was into professional music. Sunny learned seven instruments

== Career ==
Sunny has worked as an A&R consultant and Product Manager with Magnasound. During his tenure, he produced more than 50 music albums. As a journalist, he wrote columns for Chithrabhumi for five years and served as a Bureau Chief for Southern Side Magazine. Additionally, he has worked as an event manager and artist coordinator, organizing numerous events in India and abroad.

== Filmography ==
Year	Film	Music	Score	Note
2003	Sthithi	Yes	No	with M. Jayachandran and Unni Menon
2005	Isra	Yes	Yes	
2016	Sambar	Yes	No	
2020	Cochin Shadhi at Chennai 03	Yes	No	

== Albums (non-film) ==
- Janmangalai (lyrics: Kaithapram Damodaran Namboothiri singers: Shaan, Vasundhara Das, Suresh Gopi, Lenaa)
- Malayali Penne (lyrics: Shibu Chakravarthy, Kaithapram Damodaran Namboothiri singer: Jyotsna Radhakrishnan, Afsal)
- Chinmaya Geethangal (lyrics: B.K.Harinarayanan, Jyothish Kashi, Rahul Seth singer: Suresh Wadkar, P Jayachandran, Delsy Ninan)

== Personal life ==
He is married to Priya Viswanath and is settled in Ayyanthole, Thrissur.
