= Teja Bhai & Family =

- Theatrical poster
- Directed by: Deepu Karunakaran
- Written by: Deepu Karunakaran
- Produced by: Muralidharan; Santha Murali
- Starring: Prithviraj Sukumaran; Akhila Sasidharan; Suman; Suraj Venjaramoodu
- Cinematography: Shamdat Sainudeen
- Edited by: Manoj
- Music by: Deepak Dev
- Production company: Anantha Visions
- Distributed by: Murali Films; PJ Entertainments Europe
- Release date: 30 August 2011
- Running time: 147 minutes
- Country: India
- Language: Malayalam

Teja Bhai and Family is a 2011 Indian Malayalam-language action comedy film directed by Deepu Karunakaran, starring Prithviraj Sukumaran, Akhila Sasidharan, Suman and Suraj Venjaramoodu in the lead roles. One of the songs, Oru Madhura Kinavin (remix version), was sung by Vijay Yesudas. The original version of this song from the movie, Kanamarayathu, was sung by his father, K. J. Yesudas. The film was an average grosser upon its theatrical release.

== Plot ==
Teja Bhai, a well known don in Kuala Lumpur, Malaysia and his sidekicks are the top news of major dailies. One day, he happens to fall in love with Vedhika, a girl who happens to pass through his life. Vedhika also lives in Kuala Lumpur and volunteers in an orphanage and is involved in several philanthropic activities. Teja under the name Roshan befriends her. The film revolves around the love between them, without Vedhika knowing the real job of Teja.

Vedhika's father Damodarji wants his daughter to be married to a man with high social status and family heritage. The power of love makes Teja change from his way of life as an underworld don and he decides to make a good family and for this, he flies to Kerala. Teja tries to find his estranged family. He also enlists the help of a pseudo Swami Rajaguru Veshya Vachassu. The thread takes a hilarious turns with the arrival of Vedhika and her father to join Teja's family. Unable to find his real family, Guru helps Teja by hiring drama artists and small-time con artists to pose as his relatives. Meanwhile, some of Teja's enemies are also after him and his gang. There is also a struggle of hiding his real identity from Vedhika and her father. The hilarious consequences of these actions and the story that ensues and how Teja manages to win the hand of his love amidst all this chaos form the crux of the movie.

== Cast ==
- Prithviraj Sukumaran as Teja Bhai / Roshan Varma
- Akhila Sasidharan as Vedhika
- Suman as Mohan Kartha
- Suraj Venjaramoodu as Swami Rajaguru Maha Rishi Vashya Vachassu
- Thalaivasal Vijay as Damodarji, Vedhika 's father
- Jagathy Sreekumar as Vasudevan Nair
- Jagadish as Govindan Nair
- Salim Kumar as Divakaran Nair
- Indrans as Raghavan Nair
- Kochu Preman as Raveendran Nair (Sukumaran)
- Prem Kumar as Hari Prasad
- Mohan Jose as Teja's advocate
- Sidhartha Siva as Blader
- Ajith Kollam as Sranker
- Ashokan as Gopakumar
- Nandu as Mahadevan Thampi
- Bindu Panicker as Lathika
- Manju Pillai as Rathi Devi
- Kulappulli Leela as Ramani
- Ponnamma Babu as Manikutty
- Krishna Prabha as Rema
- Rajeev Govinda Pillai as Sanjay Kartha
- Nedumudi Venu
- Shobha Mohan
- Kollam Thulasi as Teja's fake father
- Kottayam Nazeer as Santhosh, Police Inspector
- Bheeman Raghu as Johnny
- Vettukili Prakash
- Mafia Sasi as Ammittu
- Shakeela as Surveyor from Health Department
- Chali Pala as Jabbar
- Manka Mahesh as Teja's fake mother

== Production ==
The film was shot in Thiruvananthapuram and Malaysia.

== Soundtrack ==
The soundtrack features 3 songs composed by Deepak Dev, 1 tracks composed by Abu Murali and a Retro Mix version of "Oru Madhurakinaavin Lehariyil" from the 80s film Kaanamarayathu.

No.	Song	Singer(s)
1	"Pranaya Nilaa"	Shaan Rahman
2	"Punjiricke Punjiricke"	Benny Dayal, Rimi Tomy
3	"Pranaya Nilaa" (Remix)	Shaan Rahman, Deepak Dev, Aalaap Raju, Rahul Nambiar
4	"Verum Naadakam Jeevithangal"	Franco
5	"Oru Madhurackinaavin" (Remix)	Vijay Yesudas, Shaan Rahman, K. J. Yesudas

== Box office ==
The film collected US$5,664 from UK box office.
