= Ezharakoottam =

- Directed by: Kareem
- Written by: Shibu Chakravarthy; Jone Paul
- Screenplay by: Shibu Chakravarthy
- Produced by: C Aravindaksha Menon; Anil C Narayanan
- Starring: Madhupal; Nadirsha; Kalabhavan Navas; Tony; Gireesh; Prashanth; Shuhaib; Dileep
- Cinematography: Rasheed Moopan
- Edited by: Venugopal
- Music by: Johnson
- Release date: 1 September 1995
- Country: India
- Language: Malayalam

Ezharakoottam (transl. Gang of seven and half) is a 1995 Indian Malayalam language comedy action crime film, directed by Kareem (in his directorial debut). The film stars Madhupal, Dileep, Manoj K. Jayan, Geetha, and Nadirsha in the lead roles. The film has musical score by Johnson.

== Cast ==
- Madhupal as Balu 1st
- Nadirsha as Antappan 2nd
- Tonny as 3rd
- Kalabhavan Navas as 4th
- Girish as 5th
- Shuhaib as 6th
- Prasantht as 7th
- Dileep as Ara
- Geetha as Susanna
- Manoj K. Jayan as S. I Vishwanathan
- Narendra Prasad as Andrews Nicolas
- Rajan P. Dev as Vakkachan
- Lekha Ramachandran as Maria
- Premachandran as Lazar
- Santhakumari as Jaanuvamma
- Baburaj as Andrews's Henchmen

== Soundtrack ==
The music was composed by Johnson and the lyrics were written by Shibu Chakravarthy.

No.	Song	Singers	Lyrics	Length (m:ss)
1	"Illikkaadum"	Swarnalatha	Shibu Chakravarthy	
2	"Theerathu"	Mano	Shibu Chakravarthy	
3	"Uthraalikkaavile Amme Bhagavathi"	Sujatha Mohan	Shibu Chakravarthy	
