= Kalyanaraman (2002 film) =

2002 film directed by Shafi

- Poster
- Directed by: Shafi
- Written by: Benny P. Nayarambalam
- Produced by: Lal
- Starring: Dileep; Navya Nair; Kunchacko Boban
- Cinematography: P. Sukumar
- Edited by: K. P. Hariharaputhran
- Music by: Berny-Ignatius
- Production company: Lal Creations
- Distributed by: Lal Release
- Release date: 20 December 2002
- Running time: 132 minutes
- Country: India
- Language: Malayalam

Kalyanaraman is a 2002 Indian Malayalam-language romantic comedy film directed by Shafi and written by Benny P. Nayarambalam, starring Dileep, Navya Nair and Kunchacko Boban. The plot follows Ramankutty and family who runs a catering service and the events that follows after they take the work of Ambattu Thampi's daughter's wedding. The music was composed by Berny-Ignatius. The film was a blockbuster and developed a cult fan following, especially the character Ponjikkara played by Innocent. The film was remade in Telugu as Kalyana Ramudu (2003).

== Plot ==
The film opens in a temple, set in the future, which is frequently visited by young couples. One day, a group of friends notices an old man about ninety, visiting the temple and asked him the reason for visiting this temple. The man, named Ramankutty, narrates his story back in 2000s. Ramankutty, in his thirties was an event organizer. He meets Gauri while doing the preparations for the wedding of her sister Radhika, both daughters of a family friend Ambattu Madhavan Thampi. However, Radhika's fiancée does not turn up for the wedding and Radhika passes out upon learning the news. Ramankutty suggests that his brother Dr. Sivadas marry Radhika and it takes place very gracefully. In a hilarious turn of events, Ramankutty and Gauri realize their love for each other which also rejoices their families, and they start arrangements for their wedding. But on the day of their engagement, Radhika dies in a kitchen fire accident.

After a long time from Radhika's demise, the family finally fixes Ramankutty's and Gauri's wedding. On the eve of the wedding, Gauri gets an electric shock. Deeply disturbed by this, Thampi visits an astrologer Meppattu Thirumeni to see the horoscope match, where he tells them that women married into the Thekkedathu family are fated to die young. He referred to the family's history. Ramankutty's grandmother died from her first pregnancy. Ramankutty's mother died shortly after giving birth to him. Ramankutty's eldest brother Achuthankutty's wife died one month after their wedding, due to a snake bite. And now Thampi's daughter Radhika has also died as she was married into Thekkedathu. Thampi, scared for his only remaining daughter's life, requests Ramankutty to back out of the marriage without the knowledge of Gauri.

Saddened and yet wanting to do the right thing, Ramankutty calls off the wedding on the pretense of not being comfortable with Gauri's close relations with her cousin Unni. Devastated by this allegation, Gauri backs out of the marriage, only to find the truth later. She runs out in search of Ramankutty, but gets into a road accident on the way. She is rushed to the hospital and while still battling for life, she wishes that Ramankutty tie the wedding knot before her surgery. Ramankutty ties the knot, fearing the worst. Miraculously, Gauri survives the surgery. Before the surgery, Ramankutty had prayed at the temple from the start of the film to protect his and Gauri's love. That is why he visits the temple frequently; to offer his thanks to God.

Ramankutty reveals that Gauri and Ramankutty then started a family and that Gauri is still alive. Gauri then joins Ramankutty in doing the rituals for the temple and Ramankutty's audience is left shocked.

== Cast ==
- Dileep as Thekkedathu Ramankutty / Kalyanaraman
- Navya Nair as Gouri
- Kunchacko Boban as Unni (Extended cameo appearance)
- Lal as Thekkedathu Achuthankutty / Achuvettan, Ramankutty's Eldest Brother
- Lalu Alex as Ambattu Thampi, Radhika and Gouri's Father
- Innocent as Ponjikkara Kesavan
- Salim Kumar as Pyarilal / Pyari
- Boban Alummoodan as Dr. Sivadasan, Ramankutty's Second Elder Brother
- Jyothirmayi as Radhika, Gouri's Elder Sister
- Kalaranjini as Saraswathy, Radhika and Gouri's Mother
- Unnikrishnan Namboothiri as Thekkedathu Gopalakrishnan, patriarch of the Thekkedathu family
- Siddique as Doctor (Cameo)
- Thilakan as Meppattu Thirumeni (Cameo)
- T. P. Madhavan as Ambattu Thampi's Relative
- Kochu Preman as U. P. P. Menon, Thampi's Manager
- Jose Pellissery as Swamy
- Narayanankutty as Suku
- Subbalakshmi as A. K. Karthyani
- Dimple Rose
- Kunjikkuttan Thampuran as an aged person, uncredited role
- Beena Sabu as Bhavani
- Eloor George as Kalyana Raman's Assistant
- Kaviraj Achari as a college student
- Sreeni Njarakkal as Astrologer

== Soundtrack ==
Kalyanaraman

Soundtrack album by Berny–Ignatius
- Released: 1 December 2002
- Genre: Feature film soundtrack
- Label: Satyam Audios
- Producer: Berny–Ignatius

Berny–Ignatius chronology
Sisiram (2002)	Kalyanaraman (2002)	Uthara (2003)

All lyrics are written by Kaithapram Damodaran Namboothiri except where noted; all music is composed by Berny–Ignatius.

No.	Title	Artist(s)	Length
1.	"Kadhayile Rajakumariyum"	K. J. Yesudas
2.	"Thinkale Poothinkale"	M. G. Sreekumar, Afsal
3.	"Thumbi Kalyanathinu Vannethiya"	M. G. Sreekumar, Sujatha Mohan
4.	"Raakadal Kadanjedutha"	K. J. Yesudas
5.	"Onnam Malakeri (Thalayum Kuthi)"	Dileep, Lal, Lalu Alex, Innocent, Kochu Preman, Salim Kumar, Narayanankutty, T. P. Madhavan, Boban Alummoodan, Choir
6.	"Kadhayile Rajakumariyum"	K. J. Yesudas, Gayatri Asokan
7.	"Raakadal Kadanjedutha"	Sujatha Mohan, Fahad
8.	"Kaithudi Thaalam Thatti"	Afsal

== Release ==
=== Theatrical ===
Kalyanaraman was released theatrically on 20 December 2002.

=== Home media ===
Kalyanaraman was released on VCD by Saina Video Vision and DVD by Moser Baer. The satellite rights were bought by Surya TV. The film is available on streaming media platforms Sun NXT and Eros Now (could also acquire from Amazon Prime Video).

== Reception ==
=== Critical reception ===
K. T. Thomas of Now Running called the film "a hilarious laugh riot" and wrote, "The story is wafer thin and has been made keeping Dileep's current image in mind. Anyways the film is all fun 'n' frolic as director Shafi and script writer Benny P. Nairambalam could have made it a whole lot more cherishable as simplicity is forsaken for chaos. Dileep is superb and Navya Nair is improving with every film." Nettv4u wrote, "Kalyanaraman is a fun movie and the wedding celebration scenes add to the feel good factor. It has a few elements which make it enjoyable. Audiences can relish a simple, sweet love story." However, criticized the film's "predictable storyline" and felt that the script could've been "better."

The Times of India wrote, "Kalyanaraman is a movie perfect for Friday evenings. From hilarious catchphrases to goofy comedy, the film will make you laugh till your jaws hurt. Laced with comedy, the film is also rich with emotions and will leave you glued to the screen." Indiainfo wrote, "It is a pure entertainer. Dileep as Kalyanaraman with his usual humorous numbers is holding on to the position as the dearest actor of the viewers." A critic from entertainment portal Sify called the film a "watchable comedy" and wrote, "Making a film with a superstar and meeting the audience's stratospheric expectations is a challenge. Fortunately, director Shafi and producer Lal have passed the tough test with the Christmas release Kalyanaraman, a hilarious laugh riot."

=== Box office ===
The film was a major commercial success. It was released in the Christmas holiday period and took one of biggest openings of the year and emerged the Christmas winner. A trade analysis by entertainment portal Indiainfo, said "Meesha Madhavan and Kunjikkoonan the two earlier hits of Dileep have been shifted from its releasing centers and have started showing in interior centers."

== Legacy ==
The title of the 2026 Malayalam film Chatha Pacha was adopted from a dialogue delivered by Salim Kumar to Dileep, which is a slang in Kochi.
