= Cinemala =

Malayalam comedy TV show

- Genre: Parody
- Created by: Diana Silvester
- Directed by: Diana Silvester
- Opening theme: "Kadhyillaathoru kadhyaanithu" "കഥയില്ലാത്തൊരു കഥയാണിത്"
- Country of origin: India
- Original language: Malayalam
- No. of episodes: 1,000

Production
- Producer: Diana Silvester
- Production location: Kerala
- Running time: Approx. 20-25 minutes

Original release
- Network: Asianet
- Release: 30 August 1993 – 23 September 2013

Cinemala (transl. Cinema Chain) is an Indian Malayalam language satirical comedy Television Series in Asianet TV channel. Starting Dileep and Salim Kumar in leading roles.

== Broadcast ==
The first episode aired on Asianet, a Malayalam news television network, on 20 August 1993. It was the first show aired on Asianet. The program was broadcast in thirty-minute episodes every Sunday at 1:30 pm (IST) until it stopped airing in 2013.

== History ==
It started as a film-based satire, which later on began to delve into contemporary political and social issues. It focused on current events, often referencing figures such as politicians and media personalities in a satirical way. These public figures were played by mimicry artists from Malayalam television.

It was awarded a place in the Limca Book of Records as one of the longest-running TV shows. On 7 April 2013, it aired its 1,000th episode.

== Cinemala 1000 ==
To celebrate the broadcasting of the 1,000th episode of Cinemala, Asianet conducted a mega stage show on July 31, 2013 titled CINEMA LA 1000 at Gokulam Convention Centre, Kochi, Kerala. Leading actors Dileep and Salim Kumar were honored during the occasion. Mementos were presented to all actors who had been a part of the Cinemala. The show featured comedy skits by Cinemala actors as well as performances by other actors such as Suraj Venjaramoodu, Mamukkoya, Indrans, P. Jayachandran, Usha Uthup, Sithara, Shamna Kasim, Subi and Tesni Khan.

== Cast ==
- Dileep
- Harisree Ashokan
- Subi Suresh
- Thesni Khan
- Saju Kodiyan
- Manoj Guinness
- Ramesh Pisharody
- Dharmajan Bolgatty
- Kottayam Nazeer
- Kochu Preman
- Salim Kumar
- Tini Tom
- Guinness Pakru
- Suraj Venjaramoodu
