= Thattassery Koottam =

2022 Malayalam film

- Theatrical release poster
- Directed by: Anoop Padmanaban
- Written by: Santhosh Echikkanam
- Produced by: Dileep
- Starring: Arjun Ashokan; Dileep; Ganapathi S. Poduval; Aneesh Gopal; Priyamvada Krishnan
- Cinematography: Jithin Stanislaus
- Edited by: V. Saajan
- Music by: Raam Sarath
- Production company: Graand Production
- Release date: 11 November 2022
- Country: India
- Language: Malayalam

Thattassery Koottam is a 2022 Indian Malayalam-language romantic comedy thriller film written by Santosh Echikkanam, directed by Anoop Padmanaban and produced by Dileep under the banner of Graand Production. The film features Arjun Ashokan, Ganapathi S. Poduval, Aneesh Gopal, Unni Rajan P. Dev, Priyamvada Krishnan, Vijayaraghavan in lead roles along with Siddique, Mamukkoya, Dileep, Vineeth Tattatil David supporting roles.

== Cast ==
- Arjun Ashokan as Sanjay, Thattashery Jewellery Owner
- Ganapathi S. Poduval as Abbas, Sanju's friend
- Aneesh Gopal as Kalesh, Sanju's friend
- Unni Rajan P. Dev as Subu, Sanju's friend
- Priyamvada Krishnan as Athira, Sanju' love interest
- Vijayaraghavan as Krishnan
- Siddique as Raveendran
- Mammukoya as Usman, (Security Guard) Iqbal's and Abbas's Father
- Nivas Adithan as Balasingham
- Surjith Gopinath
- Vineeth Tattatil David as Kallan Abdhulla
- Prayaga Martin as herself (cameo appearance) in Thattashery Jewellery
- Dileep as Iqbal, Abbas's elder brother and Sanju's friend (cameo appearance)

== Production ==
Thattassery Koottam marks the directorial debut of Anoop Padmanaban, the brother of actor Dileep, who also produced the film under the banner of Graand Production. The film stars Arjun Ashokan in the lead role and features a supporting ensemble cast of young talents.

The project was envisioned as a light-hearted youth-centric entertainer revolving around friendship, relationships, and humour. The First look of the film was released in January 2020. The trailer, released in late October 2022, highlighted a vibrant and colourful setting reflective of the film's upbeat tone.

== Release ==
The Film was released on 11 November 2022 in theatres and started digital stream ZEE5 from 13 January 2023.

== Reception ==
V Vinod Nair critic of The Times of India stated that "Overall a light-hearted, time-pass movie." and gave 3 stars out of 5. Saraswathy Nagarajan critic of The Hindu wrote that "Arjun Ashokan comes good, but the all-too-familiar tropes disappoint". Sanjith Sidhardhan critic of OTTplay gave 2.5 rating out of 5 and wrote that " Arjun Ashokan's Thattassery Koottam would have been a decent watch, had it the same tempo and mood that made its first half fun. The second half is all over the place."

A critic from Mathrubhumi noted that "the slow moving first half, the pace and mood of the story changes as we reach the second half."

Critic from The Indian Express and Manorama Online gave mixed reviews.
