= Kaaryasthan =

2010 film directed by Thomson K. Thomas

- Theatrical release poster
- Directed by: Thomson K. Thomas
- Written by: Udaykrishna–Sibi K. Thomas
- Produced by: Neeta Anto
- Starring: Dileep; Akhila Sasidharan
- Cinematography: P. Sukumar
- Edited by: Mahesh Narayanan
- Music by: Berny Ignatius
- Production company: Aan Mega Media
- Distributed by: Aan Mega Media; PJ Entertainments
- Release date: 5 November 2010
- Running time: 170 minutes
- Country: India
- Language: Malayalam
- Budget: ₹2.50 crore
- Box office: ₹4.5crore

Kaaryasthan (transl. The Caretaker) is a 2010 Malayalam-language action comedy film written by the duo Udaykrishna–Sibi K. Thomas and directed by Thomson K. Thomas (in his directorial debut). It stars Dileep, Akhila Sasidharan, Siddique, Madhu, Suraj Venjaramoodu and Salim Kumar. It was Dileep's 100th feature film. Akhila, a noted television anchor and dancer, debuted as an actress through this film. The film was released on November 5 coinciding with Diwali.The film received highly positive reviews from critics became a blockbuster at box office and it was also one of the highest grossing Malayalam films of 2010.

The film is inspired from 2000 Telugu film Kalisundam Raa with minor changes in the plot. In the film, Krishnanunni tries to settle the dispute between two feuding families. In the process of doing so, he ends up falling in love with Sreebala, who belongs to one of the families.

== Plot ==
The story is set in a picturesque village called "Krishnapuram". The two tharavadus (parentages) named Kizhakkedathu and Puthezhath are situated in the same compound, and their members share a very great bond with each other. The film begins with the celebration of Onam festival by the inmates of both the houses. Kizhakkedathu's karanavar Krishna Warrier's eldest son Rajan is in love with the karyasthan's daughter Ambika, but his marriage is fixed with Saraswathy, daughter of Sankaran Nair, the karanavar of Puthedathu. Rajan and Ambika elope, and Saraswathy is later found dead in a quarry, apparently a suicide. Puthezhathu family believes that Kizhakkedathu family has cheated them, and thus they beat up Rajan, but Krishna Warrier comes to rescue him and also pulls him up on to the train, saying that he should never return. This leads to enmity between both the families. As years pass, Krishnanunni alias Unni, the protagonist of the story, is born to Rajan.

Rajan, along with Ambika, Krishnanunni and his sister Radhika now live in Tenkasi in Tamil Nadu. He now indulges in agriculture. He is assisted by Krishnanunni. During a clash in the market, the local thief Kalidas is beaten up by Krishnanunni and his friend Vadivelu alias Pottan and is sacked and taken back in a bullock cart. Unfortunately, Kalidas escapes from the sack by jumping into a canal. When Unni and Vadivelu come to know about this, they tell their gang to beat him. Unfortunately, the sack is changed, and it is Ayyappan Nair, the former Karyasthan (manager) of Kizhakkedathu family, who is under it. Ayyappan tells Rajan about the impact caused by his elope and Saraswathy's death on the two families. Both are now sworn enemies, and they have built up walls around their homes. There also happened a lawsuit between them, on a matter of their common field, in which Kizhakkedathu family failed. It is the members of Puthedathu family who beat Ayyappan because he supported Kizhakkedathu and sent him in a sack him to Tenkasi. Unni then tells Rajan that he would go to pacify the two quarrelling families.

Then, Unni and Vadivelu reach Krishnapuram, but suddenly they find Kalidas at Kizhakkedathu tharavadu and is shocked to hear that he has been appointed as the karyasthan of Kizhakkedathu. Kalidas has reached there the previous night, and Krishna Warrier, who mistakes him as the karyasthan whom Ayyappan told, appoints him. Kalidas has a plan to steal an idol of Lord Krishna from Kizhakkedathu tharavadu, and he traps Unni and Vadivelu by handing the idol to them. Krishna Warrier later comes and unknowing that Unni is his grandson, calls his workers and beat Unni and Vadivelu. Later, they reach Puthedathu tharavadu and get job as karyasthaan and watchman respectively. The plan is approved by Sankaran Nair soon, and Kumaran, the former karyasthan, is declassified as an out-worker.

Unni later tries to solve conflicts between the two families. It is during this time that the female lead, Sreebala enters. Vadivelu first flirts with her, but after hearing that she is also a member of Puthezhath family, he allows her to enter the home. Unni also interferes in Sreebala's college dance, changing the tune of her dance song. She later dances for the same tune. On the same day, she is harassed by Anand, the son of Sreedharan and Rajan's second brother and a businessman. Krishnanunni saves her, but lies that it was Anand's father who saved her. Later, the stolen idol of Lord Krishna is found in a gravel, near the paddy fields of both families.

Soon Krishnanunni begins his mission to unite the two families, his mission becomes a great success and it soon culminates in a marriage proposal between Anand and Sreedevi, the sister of Sreebala, but Sreedevi confess to Krishnanunni that she is in love with a serial actor named Aby George and would end her life if she is forced into marrying Anand. Krishnanunni and Sreebala helps Sreedevi to elope with her boyfriend which creates further trouble in the family, and after knowing that Krishnanunni is Rajan's son, the Puthedathu and Kizhakeddathu families break ties once again, but this time, Kizhakedathu family support Krishnanunni and welcomes Rajan back home.

The rift between the families is cleared when Krishnanunni finds out that Rajan's old friend Susheelan and his driver Gopalan were responsible for Saraswathi's death, and it was not a suicide but a murder done by Susheelan. Then it is shown that after receiving the dowry given by Sankaran Nair to Rajan, Susheelan takes it to his custody, telling that he wants to start business with this money, and when Saraswathi objects it, he throws her to the quarry, killing her. In a chase between Susheelan and the families, Susheelan gets killed in a car accident. Both the families unite once again and Sreebala and Krishnanunni get married.

== Cast ==
- Dileep as Krishnanunni (Unni)
- Siddique as Kizhakkedathu Rajan Warrier, Krishnanunni's father
- Madhu as Kizhakkedathu Krishna Warrier, Rajan's father and Krishnannunni's grandfather
- G. K. Pillai as Puthezhathu Shankaran Nair, Sreebala's grandfather
- Biju Menon as Adv. Jayashankar
- K. B. Ganesh Kumar as CI Sabarinath Warrier, Rajan's younger brother
- Suraj Venjarammoodu as Vadivelu (Pottan)
- Salim Kumar as Kalidas, Kizakakkedathu Family's Karyasthan
- Harisree Asokan as Kumaran, Puthezhathu Family's Karyasthan
- Akhila Sasidharan as Sreebala Madhavan, Krishnanunni's love interest and Later wife (Voiceover by Sreeja Ravi)
- Ramu as Kizhakkedathu Sreedharan Warrier, Rajan's younger brother and Anand's father
- Janardhanan as Puthezhathu Major Ammavan
- Santhosh as Vijayan Nair
- Sadiq as Madhavan Nair, Sreebala's father
- Manoj Nair as Raveendran Warrier, Rajan's youngest brother
- Nishanth Sagar as Anand Sreedharan, Krishnanunnni's younger cousin
- Kochu Preman as Ayyappan Nair, Kizhakkedathu family's former Karyasthan
- Suresh Krishna as Susheelan, Rajan's friend and the main antagonist
- Shammi Thilakan as Gopalan, Susheelan's driver and the Secondary antagonist
- Kozhikode Narayanan Nair as Achuthan, Ambika's father and Krishnanunni's grandfather
- Kalabhavan Shajon as Aakri Ramu
- Thesni Khan as Devika, Vadivelu's love interest
- Gayathri Priya as Ambika, Rajan's wife and Krishnanunni and Radhika 's mother
- Mahima Nambiar as Radhika, Krishnanunni's sister
- Rajeev Roshan as Aby George
- Vandana Menon as Sreedevi
- Geetha Nair as Krishna Warrier's wife, Rajan's mother and Krishnanunnni's grandmother
- Roslin as Shankaran Nair's wife and Sreebala's grandmother
- Anoop Chandran as Santhosh, Hotel Manager
- Nandhu Pothuval as Gownder, Landlord of Thenkasi
- Charutha Baiju
- Reshmi Boban as Kizhakedath Family member
- Deepika Mohan as Kizhakedathu Family member
- Manju Satheesh as Puthezhath Family member
- Mini Arun as Puthezhath Family member
- Ancy as Puthezhath Family member
- Kulappulli Leela as Bus Passenger

=== Cameo Appearances ===
- Lena as Saraswathi
- Rajanikanth as himself (archieved footage)

In Mangalangal song

- Nadirshah as Himself
- Afsal as Himself
- Archana Suseelan as Herself
- Biju Narayanan as Himself
- Sreekala Sasidharan as Herself
- Rimi Tomy as Herself
- Priyanka Anoop as Herself
- Shaju Sreedhar as Himself
- Soniya Rasheed as Herself
- Beena Antony as Herself
- Balaji Sharma as Himself
- Fazal Razi as Himself
- Dinesh Panicker as Himself
- Jyotsna Radhakrishnan as Herself
- Guiness Pakru as Himself
- Krishna Praba as Herself
- Tini Tom as Himself
- Kalabhavan Navas as Himself
- Subi Suresh as Herself
- Sajan Palluruthy as Himself
- Sajan Surya as Himself
- Kalabhavan Prajod as Himself
- Aneesh Ravi as Himself
- Poojappura Radhakrishnan as Himself
- Shiju AR as Himself

In Mangalangal End Credits song

- Udaykrishna as Himself
- Sibi K. Thomas as Himself
- Anto Joseph as Himself
- Neeta Anto as Herself
- P. Sukumar as Himself
- Mahesh Narayanan as Himself

Additionally all major technicians including Art Director, Makeup Man, Dance Choreographer, Stunt Master, Camera Man, etc of the film appears in the end credit song as themselves.

== Music ==
Kaaryasthan

Soundtrack album by Berny-Ignatius
- Released: 15 November 2010
- Recorded: 2010
- Genre: Feature film soundtrack
- Length: 27:15
- Label: Sathyam Audios
- Producer: Berny-Ignatius

Berny-Ignatius chronology
Twenty:20 (2008)	Kaaryasthan (2010)	Marykkundoru Kunjaadu (2010)

The songs of the film are composed by Berny-Ignatious with lyrics written by Kaithapram Damodaran Namboothiri. The background score for the film is by Rajamani.

Track list
No.	Title	Singer(s)	Length
1.	"Malayalipenne"	Subin Ignatius, Delsy Ninan	04:35
2.	"Mangalangal"	Benny Dayal	05:04
3.	"Neeyinenne Maranno"	Jyotsna Radhakrishnan, George Peter	05.51
4.	"Thenikkappuram Thenkashikappuram"	Afsal	04:01
5.	"Onavillin"	Madhu Balakrishnan, Preetha Kanna, Thulasi	04:02
6.	"Krishna Krishna (Duet)"	George Peter, Jyotsna Radhakrishnan	04:25
Total length:			27:15

== Reception ==
=== Box office ===
The film was one of the highest grossing Malayalam film of the year 2010, and became commercial success. From 118 releasing centres, it grossed ₹1.65 crore distributor's share in its first week. Made on a budget of ₹ 2.5 crore, it got share of ₹ 4.5 crore from the domestic box office.

=== Critical response ===
Nowrunning.com labeling the film as "Disappointing", proceeding to highlight that "With all the formulaic elements intact, Karyasthan as Dileep's 100th film is a mega hit. Dileep and Suraj do manage to bring in a few giggles, but the film serves as a sure sign that Dileep needs to reinvent himself" and gave 2 stars Out of 5, while Moviebuzz of Sify.com gave positive verdict, stating that Director Thomson doesn't experiment much here and you can find every emotion in the required measures that would be essential in a formulaic film.", adding that it is "Masala Entertainer". Furthermore, he praised lead actor Dileep's "power packed" performance, citing that he "nails the character to perfection" and "carries the film to its winning point". The movie performed well at the box office and was declared a blockbuster.
