= Manathe Kottaram =

- Directed by: Sunil
- Written by: Kalabhavan Ansar; Robin Thirumala
- Produced by: Hameed
- Starring: Dileep; Harisree Ashokan; Indrans; Nadirsha; Khushbu; Suresh Gopi; Jagathy Sreekumar
- Music by: Berny-Ignatius
- Production company: Gemi Movies
- Distributed by: Star Plus Release
- Release date: 23 December 1994
- Running time: 122 minutes
- Country: India
- Language: Malayalam

Manathe Kottaram (transl. The Castle in the Sky) is a 1994 Indian Malayalam-language comedy-drama film directed by Sunil and written by Kalabhavan Ansar and Robin. The film was produced by Hameed under the banner of Gemi Movies and distributed by Star Plus Release. It stars Dileep, Nadirshah, Indrans, Harisree Ashokan, and Khushbu. Suresh Gopi makes a cameo appearance.

The movie is about four young men who are huge admirers of actress Khushboo. The four meeting the actress and a series of events taking place form the crux of the movie.

== Plot ==
Four struggling young men who were big fans of movie actress Khushboo finally get a chance to meet and befriend her when she moves into the mansion next door. Through her, Dileep also gets a chance to star in a movie.

== Cast ==
- Dileep as Dileep
- Harisree Ashokan as Balan
- Indrans as Appu
- Nadirsha as Sabu
- Khushbu as herself (Dileep's heroine and Satheesh Nair's lover)
- Suresh Gopi as Satheesh Nair (cameo appearance)
- Jagathy Sreekumar as Abraham John
- Rajan P. Dev as Lukochen Pettah
- Mala Aravindan as Kumaran
- Philomina as Dileep's mother
- Paravoor Bharathan as Swamy
- Usharani as Kanakam
- N. L. Balakrishnan
- Sadiq as Thomas Pettah/Thommichen
- Tony as Xavier Pettah/Xavichen
- C. I. Paul as Sebastian Pettah
- Rizabawa as Police Commissioner
- Shankar as Director Shankar (Cameo Appearance)
- A. K. Lohithadas as himself (Cameo Appearance)
- Siddique as himself (Cameo Appearance)
- M. P. Michael as himself (Cameo Appearance)
- Shaji Kailas as himself (Cameo Appearance)
- Sibi Malayil as himself (Cameo Appearance)
- Balachandran Chullikkad as himself (Cameo Appearance)
- Bobby Kottarakkara as Cinematographer
- Kunchan as Security Guard
- T. P. Madhavan as Security Guard
- Narayanankutty as Map seller

== Soundtrack ==
The film's soundtrack contains five songs, all composed by Berny Ignatius, with lyrics by Gireesh Puthenchery.

#	Title	Singer(s)
1	"Kanneerkkinaavinte Ullil"	M. G. Sreekumar
2	"Manjuruki Pinne Kaanam"	K. G. Markose
3	"Parapampam Pamparam Pole"	M. G. Sreekumar, K. G. Markose
4	"Poonilaamazha"	M. G. Sreekumar, K. S. Chitra
5	"Poonilaamazha" (F)	K. S. Chitra
