= Sringaravelan =

- Directed by: Jose Thomas
- Written by: Udayakrishna-Siby K. Thomas
- Produced by: Jaison Elamkulam
- Starring: Dileep; Vedhika; Lal; Joy Mathew; Kalabhavan Shajohn; Baburaj; Shammi Thilakan
- Cinematography: Shaji Kumar
- Edited by: Johnkutty
- Music by: Berny-Ignatius; Nadirshah; Rajamani
- Release date: 14 September 2013
- Running time: 170 minutes
- Country: India
- Language: Malayalam
- Box office: ₹32 crore

Sringaravelan is a 2013 Malayalam-language action comedy film directed by Jose Thomas and scripted by Udayakrishna-Siby K. Thomas. It stars Dileep and Vedhika (in her in Malayalam debut) with Lal, Kalabhavan Shajohn, Baburaj, Joy Mathew and Shammi Thilakan The film was released in Onam, and was a commercial success at the box office.

== Plot ==
Kannan is a suave con-man and the son of a fashion weaver Ayyapanashan. His father had sent him for fashion designing, but Kannan wants to become rich overnight. His friends are Yesudas alias Yesu, a goon and Vasu. Kannan tries to woo rich girls and marry them and try to make his living. Once Kannan with Vasu went to give a saree to Varmaji, who is Ayyapanashan's friend and a 'Thampuran' of the 'Kovilakam'. There Kannan meets Radhu, Varmaji's granddaughter, and falls in love with her. Kannan accidentally stops a pooja which was being held there and is forced to stay at that place for more than a fortnight. In the process, Kannan gets more attracted to Radhu and once he gets into her room when Kannan was trying to escape that place. Kannan expresses his love to her and Radhu laughs, not taking it seriously.

D. Gopi Prasad alias DGP is the father of Radhu and he is a big gangster and crime boss in Bombay who wants to hide his daughter from several enemies who seek revenge. Radhu and her grandparents don't like DGP as his ″profession″ is the cause for the death of Radhu's mother, Revathy. When Kannan gets more attracted to Radhu, she says that she loves him but due to her father and his high criminal background she will be unable to marry Kannan and if her father knows about this love, Kannan will be shot at sight. However, Radhu says that if Kannan were able to fight her father and marry her, she would be ready to go with him.

Kannan gets scared hearing this. But he doesn't want to lose Radhu. DGP orders Kannan to leave the house before the next morning. At night, when Kannan was sitting at the veranda of the outhouse, he notices someone baefing into the house and trying to shoot Radhu and in the nick of time, intending to prevent it from happening, there ensues a fight with the assassin. Learning that all have woken up, he escapes. DGP, who had ordered Kannan to leave demands not to go until the killer is found. Kannan brings Yesu (who disguises as an astrologer) to the house for help. One day, Varmaji finds Radhu with Kannan and slaps him. But he realises that they are in love and Varmaji accepts it. He plans to get Radhu married to Kannan. He had a wish to have Revathy's marriage at a temple in Mellkkallur, but now he plans to make Radhu's marriage there. He asks DGP whether to take Radhu out but he refuses. Yesu helps Kannan to bring Radhu to Mellkkallur through his friend Mahalingam who is a kidnapping specialist. But while searching for Radhu, DGP and his men threaten Yesu to check astrologically where Radhu is and he tells that she is going to Mellkkallur. He asks their manager Govindan Nair where Varmaji went and he tells Varmaji went to a temple in Thrissur for a pooja for Radhu. This confuses them and they go to Thrissur to find Radhu, but they fail to get her. Then they goes to Mellkkallur temple to find her. Meanwhile, Kannan goes to a lodge where Varmaji is and tells that their plan succeeded. He finds his parents there who came to see Kannan's marriage. They finds Yesu in the astrologer look and tells Varmaji that Yesu is a Christian. Kannan apologies to Varmaji and tells that he brought Yesu for a help but he didn't think that Yesu will come as an astrologer. Then they goes to temple for the wedding. When Kannan goes to tie the thali knot on Radhu, the killer who tried to kill Radhu earlier comes there again and tries to shoot them but they escapes. DGP comes there and saves them.

The next day, DGP finds about the shootout that happened in the temple in many newspapers. Angrily, he and his gang hits Kannan. Varmaji tells them that he told Kannan to take Radhu to the temple to get them married. DGP slaps Radhu and he tries to kill Kannan, but she stops it and tells that she will marry the person whom her father told earlier which made Kannan very upset. DGP kicks him out of the house and his father comes there to take him. DGP seeks help from SI Ukken Tintu, a funny and comedian police officer to make some arrangements and full protection for Radhu's marriage in the auditorium. Tintu thinks that DGP is really the Director general of police and helps him. Only Kannan knows the killer so the police takes him along with his friends. His friends tells that they all are Kannan which confuses Tintu. He takes many persons whose names are Kannan to the police station. DGP finds Kannan and tells to identify. He fools them by drawing the wrong person. DGP gives 2 lakhs to Tintu to keep Kannan and his friends in custody. But he releases Kannan as he realises he loves Radhu and DGP is a criminal. He gives the two lakhs to Kannan and he tells that the person whom he drew was Oommen Chandy and he tells that he didn't draw the killer's face as he thought that there might be some people in the police who might be the killer's men. Meanwhile, DGP makes arrangements for Radhu's marriage but she was unhappy. Varmaji tells him that he was a father like DGP but he lost his daughter due to him. DGP tells that he didn't force and marry Revathy but it was due to some circumstances.

He reveals that in a police attack that happened in Bandra, he got shot and to treat attacked gangster they kidnaps medical students where Revathy was one of them. Ahuja, their gang leader selects Revathy to treat DGP. When she was treating him, Ahuja and his men plays a foul and tries to rape her and the other medical students. DGP plans to save Revathy. He kills many of his men and shoots Ahuja on his hand. He went for searching DGP and Revathy due to revenge. The duo went hiding and soon got married. Radhu's birth changes their life and they live happily. At the same time, DGP became the leader of his gang and Ahuja remains to be main enemy. He became a threat to their happiest life, but Revathy was unaware about this. At a holi festival, Ahuja comes to their house and kills Revathy. DGP and his men goes to Ahuja's house who was celebrating his daughter's wedding and kills Ahuja and his men thus avenging Revathy's death. During the shootout, his daughter gets shot. Before dying, Ahuja tells that Radhu will be killed by one of his men. Back to the present, DGP now believes that the killer is Ahuja's henchman. He brought Radhu to Kerala as he thought it is a safe place and for a good marriage. He tells that he needs to win by saving his daughter.

On the day of the marriage, they all goes to the wedding hall with the needed security, but on the way a gang of thugs attacks them. A shootout occurs where the thugs shoots all of DGP's men and DGP kills one of the thugs. Soon, the killer arrives and the thugs were revealed to be his men. He hits DGP and reveals his identity as Vikram, Ahuja's son. He came to avenge his father's death and last wish by killing Radhu, as Ahuja told to DGP earlier. When he goes to shoot Radhu in front of her father, Kannan arrives and saves her. Kannan takes her with him but Vikram and his men follows them along with her father. During the chase, Vikram's and DGP's car collides with each other. Kannan and Radhu reaches a building where he fights off Vikram's men with his friend's help and confronts Vikram. Yesu gives a gun (which one of Vikram's men had) to Kannan and he points it on Vikram. When DGP comes there, Kannan gives the gun to him and DGP kills Vikram. Kannan didn't kill Vikram as it was a problem between them and Kannan needs to marry Radhu. DGP thanks Kannan for saving Radhu and tells to join them for the marriage. He becomes very emotional. When DGP leaves to the wedding hall with Radhu, he is arrested by Tintu for murdering Vikram. He reveals that he recorded, DGP shooting Vikram in his phone as an evidence. DGP tells that he needs to watch Radhu's marriage so he needs to go. Kannan stops them and tells he will marry Radhu. He tells DGP to surrender and calls him as "Pappa" as Radhu's father is also his father. Tintu who calls himself also as Kannan takes DGP. Finally, Kannan and Radhu reunites.

== Cast ==
- Dileep as Kannan
- Vedhika as Radhu, Kannan's love interest (voiceover by Vimmy Mariam George)
- Lal as Yesudas (Yesu)
- Kalabhavan Shajon as Vasu
- Joy Mathew as D. Gopi Prasad (DGP)
- Baburaj as Mahalingam
- Nedumudi Venu as Varmaji, Radhu's grandfather
- Babu Namboothiri as Ayyappanasaan, Kannan's father
- Rahul Dev as Vikram, the main antagonist
- Sharat Saxena as Ahuja, the secondary antagonist
- Shammi Thilakan as Ukken Tintu (Kannan) (reprising his role from Neram)
- Ambika Mohan as Savithri, Kannan's mother
- Geetha Salam as Astrologer
- Pala Aravindan
- Ponnamma Babu as Aishwarya Rani
- Saju Kodiyan as Narayanan Nair
- Sreedevi Unni as Kovilakam Thampuratti, Varmaji's wife
- Anju Aravind as Revathy, Radhu's mother and DGP's wife
- Anjana Appukuttan

== Soundtrack ==
Song	Musician	Lyricist	Singers
"Ashakoshale Pennundo"	Nadirsha	Nadirsha	Afsal, Dileep
"Indraneelangalo Pranaya"	Berny Ignatious	Rafeeq Ahamed	Madhu Balakrishnan
"Machaane"	Berny Ignatious	Nadirsha	Nadirsha
"Minnaminungin Vettam"	Berny Ignatious	Rafeeq Ahamed	Subin, Delsy Ninan
"Naalambalam Anayaan"	Berny Ignatious	Rafeeq Ahamed	Sudeep Kumar, Jyotsna
"Neerthullikal Thorathey"	Berny Ignatious	Rafeeq Ahamed	Tansen Berny, Thulasi Yatheendran

== Reception ==
Metromatinee.com review: "Dileep is typically exuberant and the heroine Vedhika looks gorgeous and thankfully doesn't look out of place".

== Box office ==
The film is commercial success. The film grossed ₹4.92 crore (US$510,000) from 5 days alone in Kerala box office. The film collected ₹32 crore from Kerala box office in its final run.
