= Vellaripravinte Changathi =

- Directed by: Akku Akbar
- Written by: G.S Anil
- Produced by: Arun Ghosh; Bijoy Chandran
- Starring: Dileep; Kavya Madhavan
- Cinematography: Vipin Mohan; Samir Haq
- Music by: Mohan Sithara
- Production company: Chandvi Creations
- Release date: 25 December 2011
- Country: India
- Language: Malayalam
- Budget: ₹ 3 crore
- Box office: ₹ 12.57 crore

Vellaripravinte Changathi (The Dove's Friend) is a 2011 Malayalam period drama film directed by Akku Akbar, starring Dileep and Kavya Madhavan in the lead roles. The film is loosely based on the famous Sulekha murder case. The film received positive reviews from critics and became a commercial success at the box office.

== Plot ==
Vellaripravinte Changathi is based on the story of film-maker Augustine Joseph who made a Malayalam film in 1966. However, due to some reasons, the film did not make it to the theatres. Manikunju wants to finish and release an old movie. His father, Augustine Joseph, shot the film 35 years ago. Debt and money troubles forced his father to stop and later led to a tragic end. [1, 2, 3]

Manikunju finds the old film reels. He sets out to track down the actors who worked on the project. As he searches, he uncovers secrets about the past and the deep bonds formed during that long-ago shoot. [1, 2, 3]

== Cast ==
- Dileep as Mukkom Shajahan / Ravi
  - Dhananjay as young Ravi
- Kavya Madhavan as Mary Varghese / Sulekha
  - Sandra as young Sulekha
- Manoj K Jayan as Krishnan / Basheer
  - Sabith as young Basheer
- Indrajith Sukumaran as Manikunju
- Ramu as Augustine Joseph, father of Manikkunju
- Sai Kumar as Varikkodan Mash / Thangaluppappa
- Lal as himself
- Vijayaraghavan as Editor K.Sankunni
- Maniyanpilla Raju as Preman
- Mamukkoya as Moonnaan
- Suraj Venjaramoodu as himself
- Anil Murali as Moosa
- Sadiq
- Zeenath
- Geetha salam
- Cherthala Lalitha
- Kollam Thulasi
- Thamanna as Radha, Ravi's sister

== Production ==
The film was earlier titled Ithaano Valiya Karyam but was later renamed to the present title. It was shot in locations at Thodupuzha, Ernakulam, Pollachi, and Kanyakumari.

== Awards ==
Dileep's role as Mukkom Shajahan / Ravi in this film won the Kerala state film award for the Best actor for the year 2011

== Soundtrack ==
All lyrics are written by Vayalar Sarath Chandra Varma; all music is composed by Mohan Sithara.

No.	Title	Artist(s)	Length
1.	"Pathinezhinte"	Shreya Ghoshal, Kabeer
2.	"Naanam Chaalicha"	Manjari & Priya Aji
3.	"Thekko Thekkorikkal"	Poornasree
4.	"Pathinezhinte Poonkaralil"	Shreya Ghoshal
