= Sainyam =

- Directed by: Joshiy
- Written by: S. N. Swamy; Shibu Chakravarthy
- Produced by: V. Balaram
- Starring: Mammootty; Mukesh; Priya Raman; Mohini; Vikram; Dileep; Kalabhavan Abi; Kalabhavan Navas; Sukumaran
- Cinematography: Jayanan Vincent
- Edited by: K. Sankunny
- Music by: S. P. Venkatesh
- Distributed by: Ambu Films
- Release date: 15 September 1994
- Running time: 177 minutes
- Country: India
- Language: Malayalam

Sainyam is a 1994 Malayalam-language epic war action film written by S. N. Swamy and directed by Joshiy. Starring Mammootty, Mukesh, Priya Raman, Mohini, Vikram, Dileep, and Sukumaran in main roles. The film score and soundtrack were composed by S. P. Venkatesh.

== Plot ==
The story is about the life of an Indian Air Force officer Group Captain, Eashwar, who engages himself in a project called "Red Alert," which involves the renovation of condemned aircraft. He is 35, unmarried, and interested in the research wing of the air force. Eshwar is assisted by Wing Commander Zakir.

As a cover, the research is being conducted at an Indian Air Force Academy. The cadets Jiji, Thomas a.k.a. 'Kokku' Thoma, and especially Shradha Kaul, provide comic relief.

Meanwhile, terrorists/anti-nationals are trying to steal the project's secrets.

== Cast ==
- Mammootty as Group Captain A.J.Eashwar
- Mukesh as Wing Commander Zakir Ali
- Priya Raman as Cadet Shradha Kaul
- Mohini as Lakshmi
- Vikram as Cadet Jiji, Thomas's friend
- Dileep as Cadet Thomas 'Kokku'/ Thomachan, Jjji's friend
- Abi as Cadet Das, Jiji's friend
- Mukundan as Cadet Biju, Jiji's friend
- Rajeev Rangan as Cadet, Jiji's friend
- T.S Krishnan as Sikh Cadet, Jiji's friend
- Sukumaran as Air Vice Marshal Nambiar, Eashwar's Superior officer
- Prem Kumar as Ramu, Eashwar's cook
- Sonia as Fathima, Wife of Zakir
- Valsala Menon as Eashwar's Aunt
- Kozhikode Narayanan Nair as Swaminathan, Eashwar's Uncle
- Devan Sreenivasan as Sreenath IPS, Commissioner of Police
- K.P.A.C. Sunny as Defence Minister
- Ravikumar as Major Sreeram
- Santhosh as Baiju, a military commando
- Rasheed Ummer as Chacko, military commando
- Appa Haja as Kannan, military commando
- Vijay Menon as Salim, Terrorist
- Ajay Rathnam as Terrorist
- Ravi Jack as a Terrorist
- Nandu as Rajan, Salesman
- Hariraj as Cadet

== Production ==
The film was shot at the Air Force Academy in Dundigal. The shoot was originally scheduled for November, but was postponed to March after Mammootty got chicken pox.

== Music ==
Shibu Chakravarthy wrote all the lyrics.

- "Mercury" - Sujatha Mohan, Mano, Malgudi Subha
- "Chellacherukaatte" - Sujatha Mohan, G Venugopal
- "Kallikkuyile" - K. S. Chithra
- "Baggy Jeansum" - Krishnachandran, Lekha R Nair, Mano, Sindhu Devi Shibu Chakravarthy
- "Puthan Kathir" - R Usha
- "Vaarmudithumpil" - K. S. Chithra, G Venugopal
- "Nenchil Idanenchil" - Krishnachandran

== Release ==
The film was released on 15 September 1994.

=== Box office ===
The film was both a commercial and critical success.

== Legacy ==
The song "Baggy Jeansum" was paid homage to with a reference in the interlude of the song Kinnam Katta Kallan" in the 2018 film Kaly.
