= Prince and Family =

2025 Indian comedy drama film

- Theatrical release poster
- Directed by: Binto Stephen
- Written by: Sharis Mohammed
- Produced by: Listin Stephen
- Starring: Dileep; Raniya Raanaa; Dhyan Sreenivasan; Siddique; Johny Antony; Bindu Panicker; Josekutty Jacob
- Cinematography: Renadive
- Edited by: Sagar Dass
- Music by: Sanal Dev
- Production company: Magic Frames
- Distributed by: Magic Frames
- Release date: 9 May 2025
- Running time: 134 minutes
- Country: India
- Language: Malayalam
- Box office: ₹23.56 crore

Prince and Family is a 2025 Indian Malayalam-language comedy drama film directed by Binto Stephen (in his directorial debut) and written by Sharis Mohammed. The film was produced by Listin Stephen through Magic Frames. It stars Dileep, Raniya Raanaa, Dhyan Sreenivasan, Siddique, Bindu Panicker, Johny Antony, Manju Pillai and Josekutty Jacob in the lead roles.The film was 150th film of Dileep.

The film was released in theatres on 9 May 2025. The film received mixed to positive reviews from critics and became a commercial success at box office.

== Plot ==
Prince Chakkalakkal, a talented fashion designer from Kochi, Ernakulam is the eldest of three brothers and the main breadwinner of his family, running a successful bridal boutique. Despite being responsible, caring, and well-respected, Prince remains unmarried even after his younger brothers settle down, mainly due to his reserved nature and the family's high expectations for a bride.

After a series of failed proposals, through an arranged marriage, Prince finally marries Chinju Elsa Rani, a confident and outgoing young woman who is a vlogger and influencer on social media. Prince didn't feel much happy on Chinju's extroverted lifestyle but he didn't express it initially. He was smitten by her beauty and vibrance and was happy that she is treating him and his family well. Prince's family enjoys her character and they also became active in social media. However, after some time, her behaviour begins to create discomfort within the family especially with Prince's mother and sisters-in-law when she lies about being pregnant as part of a prank video. Chinju also forces Prince to accompany her to all places where she goes as part of social media works. This leads to Prince neglecting his boutique and facing loss of reputation.

Tensions escalate when Chinju becomes embroiled in a viral online controversy after one of her videos sparks public outrage. To stay viral in the ever-swaying social media world, Chinju had falsely accused Safiya, Prince's family friend who runs a small lunch place, of low quality food and lack of cleanliness. Coincidentally, a girl who frequents Safiya's lunch place gets hospitalised due to severe poisoning, leading to Safiya's imprisonment and subsequent suicide attempt. This causes Prince to leave Chinju, for causing such agony to his friend Safiya and family.

Soon after, the poisoned girl was found to have been poisoned by her friend and not from Safiya's food. This causes widespread public outrage against Chinju, who realises the flimsiness of the social media world and regrets not caring enough about relations that matter in real life. She apologises to Prince, Prince forgives her, and they decide to start things afresh in Bangalore, where Prince has landed a fashion designing job.

But, as they began their journey to Bangalore, Chinju receives a phone call proposing to cast her and Prince in upcoming BigBoss show, to which she eagerly agrees, while an oblivious Prince relaxes that issues are over. What follows next is left to the audience's imagination.

== Cast ==
- Dileep as Prince Chakkalakkal, a famous fashion designer
- Raniya Raanaa as Chinju Elsa Rani, Prince's wife and a social media vlogger (voice dubbed by Vincy Aloshious)
- Dhyan Sreenivasan as Jince Chakkalakkal, Prince's young brother
- Siddique as Baby Chakkalakkal, Prince's father
- Bindu Panicker as Jancy Chakkalakkal, Prince's mother
- Johny Antony as Krishna Kumar aka KK, Prince's friend
- Manju Pillai as Safiya Anil
- Josekutty Jacob as Shins Chakkalakkal, Prince and Jince's young brother
- Ashwin Jose as Musthaq, Prince's textile shop salesman
- Parvathy R Sankaradi as Mareena, Jince's wife
- Rosebeth as Shins's wife
- Vijay Jacob as Anil, Safiya's husband
- Urvashi as Home Minister A.K. Josephine (cameo appearance)
- Meenakshi Madhavi as Anna Mathew, Prince's crush
- Vineeth Thattil David as CI Stephen (cameo appearance)
- Letha Das as Jessy, Anna's mother
- Kalabhavan Jinto as SI David

== Production ==
The film marks the directorial debut of Binto Stephen, with screenplay by Sharis Mohammed. The film's title was officially announced with a first-look poster in October 2024. The production was handled by Listin Stephen through Magic Frames. The film marks Dileep's 150th film.

The film was shot in 85 days in Ooty, Kozhikode, and Ernakulam.

== Music ==
Prince and Family

Soundtrack album by Sanal Dev
- Released: April 2025
- Genre: Feature film soundtrack
- Length: 6m 3s
- Label: Magic Frames Music

The film's music was composed by Sanal Dev.

No.	Title	Lyrics	Music	Singer(s)	Length
1.	"Heartbeat Koodanu"	Vinayak Sasikumar	Sanal Dev	Afsal	2:48
2.	"Mere Rani"	Vinayak Sasikumar	Sanal Dev	Udit Narayan	3:15
Total length:					6:03

== Release ==
=== Theatrical ===
Prince and Family was released theatrically on 9 May 2025, having originally been planned for 25 April 2025.

=== Home media ===
The post-theatrical streaming rights were acquired by ZEE5. The film began streaming from 20 June 2025. The Tamil dubbed version also released on the same date. The satellite rights of the film is acquired by Asianet and premiered on 5 September 2025 on occasion of Onam.

== Critical reception ==
Anna Mathews of The Times of India rated the film 3/5 stars and wrote, "the writing and direction feels choppy in quite a few areas, with some situations not playing out in full [...] For those who enjoy the typical Dileep brand of comedy, Prince and Family will provide enough laughs. But it might not be enough to engage everyone." Raisa Nasreen of Times Now gave it 3/5 stars and wrote, "Binto Stephen's direction ensures the film doesn't have too many dull moments, while maintaining the film's momentum. However there are moments when you think the film can be crisp."

Anandu Suresh of The Indian Express gave it 2.5/5 stars and wrote, "With worn-out jokes on snoring and people's pregnancies, there are quite a few points where Prince and Family tries too much." Vignesh Madhu of The New Indian Express gave it 2/5 stars and wrote, "Dileep has lately been criticised for his outdated, and caricaturish performances, and thankfully, he keeps it largely subtle here. [...] On the surface level, Prince and Family might have the look and feel of a contemporary feel-good film but it still has a lot of regressive ideas."
