= Thilakkam =

- DVD cover
- Directed by: Jayaraj
- Screenplay by: Rafi Mecartin
- Story by: Alangottu Leelakrishnan
- Produced by: Anish Varma
- Starring: Dileep; Kavya Madhavan; Thiagarajan
- Cinematography: Alagappan N.
- Edited by: N. P. Sathish
- Music by: Kaithapram Viswanathan; Rajamani (score)
- Release date: 11 April 2003
- Running time: 151 minutes
- Country: India
- Language: Malayalam

Thilakkam (transl. Glitter) is a 2003 Indian Malayalam-language black comedy film directed by Jayaraj and written by Rafi Mecartin. Dileep, Kavya Madhavan, and Thiagarajan play the lead roles. The rest of the cast includes Nedumudi Venu, K. P. A. C. Lalitha, Nishanth Sagar, Jagathy Sreekumar, Cochin Haneefa, Harisree Ashokan, Salim Kumar, and Bindu Panicker. It was remade in Kannada as Nandeesha in 2012, starring Komal.

== Plot ==
Padmanabhan Master and his wife, Devaki, desperately long to be reuniting with Unni, their only son, who has been missing for many years. Ten-year-old Unni got lost in the crowd during a temple festival where he went with his neighbour, Panicker, popularly known as Poorappanikkar. Panicker too did not go back to the village as he decided to return only after finding Unni. Panicker's daughter Ammu also believes, like the Padmaabhan and Devaki, that her father will return one day with Unni. The master publishes a photo made by an artist based on assumptions about older Unni in the newspaper. He finds his son after years at Nagappattinam and brings him to the village. Soon, the villagers realises that Unni is abnormal and mentally challenged. He behaves like a small boy and creates all sorts of trouble for the villagers and his parents. His main hobby is to snatch mundu from people. This leads to a series of comical incidents in the village.

He is given ayurveda treatment under the guidance of the church priest Fr. Stephen. Ammu looks after Unni, to which her cousin Gopikkuttan objects, as he loves her. Meanwhile, Panicker returns to the village. Gopikuttan tries to turn Panicker against Unni. Eventually, Ammu falls in love with Unni and waits for his recovery to marry him. Finally, during a fight with Gopikkuttan, Unni tries to save him by holding onto his mundu when Gopikkuttan is about to fall off a cliff. Unni gets his memory of his past back and reveals the truth to Ammu that he is actually Vishnu, the son of a Bangalore underworld gangster, Maheshwaran Thampi.

Vishnu disapproves of Thampi's lifestyle and lives separately from his father. He falls in love with Gauri, an orphan girl, and decides to marry her against his father's wishes. Vishnu and Gauri's friends arrange a secret party for them. Thampi learns about the party and its location. His men attack the place, and during the commotion, Gauri falls down even though Vishnu tries to save her. Due to this, Vishnu lost his memory and became mentally challenged.

In the present, Thampi visits Vishnu and asks him to come home. Vishnu refuses initially but agrees to go along after Padmanabhan Master asks him to do so. At his home, Thampi tells Vishnu that he realised his mistake and that for the mistakes he made, Vishnu and Gauri were the ones who were punished. Thampi informs him that Gauri is not dead but is bedridden. Before her death, she wanted to meet Vishnu as her last wish, which Thampi fulfills. Gauri asks Vishnu to marry Ammu and bring her to Gauri. The film ends with Vishnu marrying Ammu, and Krishnankutty, Unni's friend and a village tailor, snatching his dhothi.

== Cast ==
- Dileep as Vishnu / Unnikrishnan (mistaken)
- Kavya Madhavan as Ammu, Unni's neighbour and love interest
- Thiagarajan as Maheswaran Thampi, Unni's biological father (voiceover by Sai Kumar)
- Nedumudi Venu as Padmanabhan Master, Unni's adoptive father
- Jagathy Sreekumar as Fr. Stephen, the parish priest
- K. P. A. C. Lalitha as Devakiamma, Unni's adoptive mother
- Cochin Haneefa as Gunda Bhaskaran
- Harisree Ashokan as Tailor Krishnankutty, Unni's friend
- Salim Kumar as Omanakkuttan, Unni's brother-in-law
- Oduvil Unnikrishnan as Poorappanikkar, Ammu's father
- Bindu Panicker as Vanaja, Unni's sister
- Nishanth Sagar as Gopikkuttan
- Mamukkoya as Pathrose, postman
- Machan Varghese as Kunjavara, the sexton
- Kalabhavan Shajon as 1st Mahout
- Kochu Preman as Swaminathan, a Velichappad
- Priyanka Anoop as Panjavarnam
- Hakim Rawther as Ajayan, 2nd Mahout
- Subbalakshmi as Ammu's grandmother
- Mahalakshmi
- Bhavana as Gauri, Vishnu's love interest, and killed by Vishnu's mistake (guest role)

== Soundtrack ==
The music for this movie was composed, as well as lyrics written, by Kaithapram Damodaran Namboothiri. "Neeyoru Puzhayay" and "Enikkoru Pennundu" were popular tracks.

Track	Song title	Singer(s)	Raga(s)
1	"Ee Kannan"	Kallara Gopan, Sujatha Mohan	Anandabhairavi
2	"Sare Sare"	Sujatha Mohan, Dileep	
3	"Evide astami"	Dr. K. J. Yesudas, T. K. Kala	
4	"Poovidarum Thallam"	Dr. K. J. Yesudas	Kedaram
5	"Neeyoru Puzhayay"	P. Jayachandran	Kanada
6	"Veyilaliyum"	Dr. K. J. Yesudas	
7	"Enikkoru Pennundu"	Dr. K. J. Yesudas	Mohanam
8	"Enna Thavam"	Chinmayi Sripaada	Kapi

== Box office ==
The film was declared a commercial success.

== Reception ==
A critic from Sify wrote, "The first half has some Jayaraj touches with good humour and the second half peters out to suit the superstar image of Dileep with some unbelievable twists, stale melodrama and finally a predictable ending".

== Awards ==
- Kerala State Film Award for Best Male Playback Singer - P. Jayachandran for the song Neeyoru Puzhayayi
