= Ee Parakkum Thalika =

2001 film directed by Thaha

- Poster
- Directed by: Thaha
- Screenplay by: VR Gopalakrishnan
- Story by: Govind Padman; Mahesh Mithra
- Produced by: M. M. Hamsa
- Starring: Dileep; Harisree Ashokan; Nithya Das; Cochin Haneefa; Salim Kumar
- Cinematography: Saloo George
- Edited by: Ranjan Abraham
- Music by: Ouseppachan
- Production company: Kalasangham Films
- Release date: 4 July 2001
- Running time: 142 minutes
- Country: India
- Language: Malayalam

Ee Parakkum Thalika (transl. This Flying Saucer) is a 2001 Indian Malayalam-language slapstick comedy drama film directed by Thaha and starring Dileep, Harisree Ashokan, Nithya Das, and Cochin Haneefa. It was written by V. R. Gopalakrishnan. The film also marked the debut of Nithya Das. The story follows bus owner Unnikrishnan and his assistant, Sundareshan, who live and sleep in their bus. It is considered one of the best slapstick comedy movies in Malayalam cinema and was one of the highest-grossing Malayalam movie of the year 2001. The bus known as Thamarakshan Pilla, which is a central figure in the movie, eventually developed into a cult figure in Kerala.

== Plot ==
Unnikrishnan owns and drives an old bus, received as compensation for his father Thamarakshan Pillai's road accident, which killed Pillai, who was a chenda master. Unni faces consequences due to the pathetic condition of the bus, named after his father. He sells several valuable things to maintain the bus. His friend and distant relative, Sundareshan, is his only companion and the bus's cleaner. A mouse has eaten Sundareshan's passport and spoiled his chances of going abroad causing him further distress. Some part of the film's comedy involves Sundareshan running behind the mouse for revenge. A live TV show in which Unni badmouths Circle Inspector Veerappan Kurup lands him in more trouble when the former commands Unni to leave the city with the bus. Sreedhara Kaimal, a banker and well-wisher, tries to help Unni with a bank loan to run a mobile kitchen (Thattukada) from his bus.

The plot takes a turn when a girl named Basanthi enters the bus as a nomad. She is actually Gayathri, the daughter of an influential and politically powerful minister R. K. Santhanam in Puducherry. Santhanam forces Gayathri to join politics, which made her leave home. Initially, Gayathri refuses to leave the bus, despite Unni's and Sundareshan's constant efforts. The police trace her and take her back to Santhanam's custody. Santhanam is making arrangements for her marriage to someone else. Meanwhile, Unni realizes that he cannot live without Gayathri. He and Sundareshan secretly enter her house. When Unni and his friends plan to take Gayathri, Santhanam finds them inside the almirah. Santhanam's men start beating up Unni despite Gayathri's pleas to stop. A terribly wounded Unni fights back and refuses to let go of Gayathri and Santhanam realises their true love, letting his daughter go with Unni on his bus.

== Cast ==
- Dileep as Unnikrishnan T (Unni), and Irinjalakuda Thamarakshan Pillai, Unni's deceased father (photo)
- Harisree Ashokan as Sundareshan M. K. (Sundaran)
- Nithya Das as Gayathri Devi / Basanthi
  - Sanusha as young Gayathri
- Cochin Haneefa as CI Veerappan Kurup, and Father of CI Veerappan Kurup (photo)
- Salim Kumar as Porotta Koshi
- Oduvil Unnikrishnan as Sreedhara Kaimal, Bank manager
- Babu Namboothiri as Krishna Pillai
- Machan Varghese as Moosa
- P. Vasu as Minister R. K. Santhanam
- Sabitha Anand as Lakshmi
- Bala Singh as Minister Muthuraman
- Kunchan as Avaran Aryakal
- Johny Antony as Kabuliwalla at police station
- Kalabhavan Haneef as wedding groom
- Geetha Salam as the wedding groom's father
- Narayanankutty as Police officer
- Kalabhavan Shajon as Traffic police officer
- Praseetha Menon as TV reporter
- Anwar Rasheed as Man drinking at Santhanam's house (cameo appearance)

== Reception ==
Ee Parakkum Thalika was a major commercial success. The film was one of the few films of the year that could retrieve its cost of investment and make a profit. It is considered one of Dileep's first solo hits. The success of the film further enhanced Dileep's stardom and established him as a bankable star. In a year-end trade analysis by Rashtra Deepika, they called Ee Parakkum Thalika the biggest financial success of the year and termed it a "surprise hit" It was the second-longest running Malayalam film of 2001, after the Mohanlal starrer Ravanaprabhu.

== Soundtrack ==
All lyrics are written by Gireesh Puthenchery; all music is composed by Ouseppachan

No.	Title	Artist(s)	Length
1.	"Arumayaam Sandhyayodu"	M. G. Sreekumar
2.	"Ka Kaattile"	K. J. Yesudas, K. S. Chithra
3.	"Kudamulla Kammalaninjal"	K. J. Yesudas
4.	"Kudamulla" (Violin Solo)	Ouseppachan
5.	"Kuppivala Kaikalum"	K. S. Chithra
6.	"Kuppivala Kaikalum"	M. G. Sreekumar
7.	"Parakkum Thalika"	M. G. Sreekumar
8.	"Pathu Pavanil"	M. G. Sreekumar

== Remakes ==
The film was remade as Aaduthu Paaduthu in Telugu, as Dakota Express in Kannada and as Sundara Travels in Tamil. Many scenes from the movie inspired parts of the Hindi movie Chal Chala Chal.
