= Shibu Chakravarthy =

Indian lyricist and screenwriter

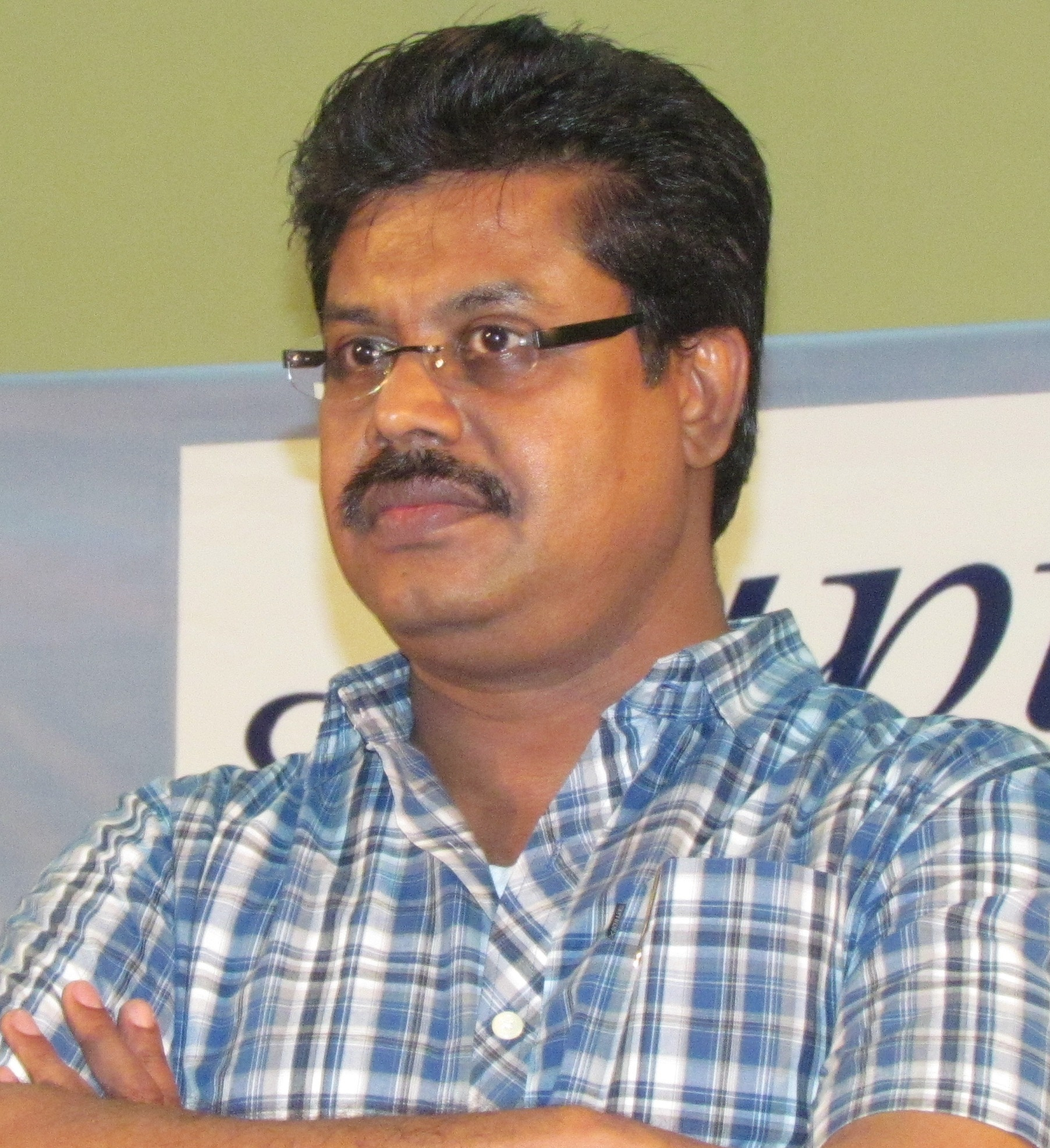
- Shibu Chakravarthy

Background information
- Born: Shibu Chakravarthy
- Genres: Film score
- Occupations: Lyricist, Screenwriter, Journalist
- Years active: 1984–present

Shibu Chakravarthy is an Indian lyricist, screenwriter, and journalist who works in Malayalam cinema.

== Career ==
He was introduced to the Malayalam film industry by Rajan Prakash of Prakash Movie tone. His first film was Allimalarkkavu (1984), made while he was doing his master's degree in philosophy in Maharaja's College, Ernakulam. He continued his studies and secured a diploma in journalism while working in the film industry. His breakthrough was the film Shyama with the song "Chembarathy Poove chollu", and became a lyricist.

Besides being a lyricists and screenwriter, he has also worked as a graphic designer with Gayathri Asokan at Gayathri designs. He had then worked on poster designs for many Malayalam movies and cover designs for music cassettes.

He has worked with Ouseppachan, M.K. Arjunan, Raghu Kumar, Shyam, Ravindran, Johnson, K.J. Joy, Kannoor Rajan, Jerry Amal Dev, M.G. Radhakrishnan, S.P. Venketesh, Mohan Sithara, M. Jayachandran, Alphons and Deepak Dev.

== As script writer ==
- Manu Uncle, directed by Dennis Joseph
- Adharvam, directed by Dennis Joseph
- Nair Saab (as co-writer with Dennis Joseph), directed by Joshiy
- Orkkappurathu, directed by Kamal
- Samrajyam, directed by Jomon
- Abhayam, directed by Sivan
- Ezharakoottam, directed by Karim.
- Parvathy Parinayam directed by P. G. Viswambharan
- Churam, directed by Bharathan
- Sainyam - directed by Joshi
