= Dileep =

Indian actor and producer

Dilieep
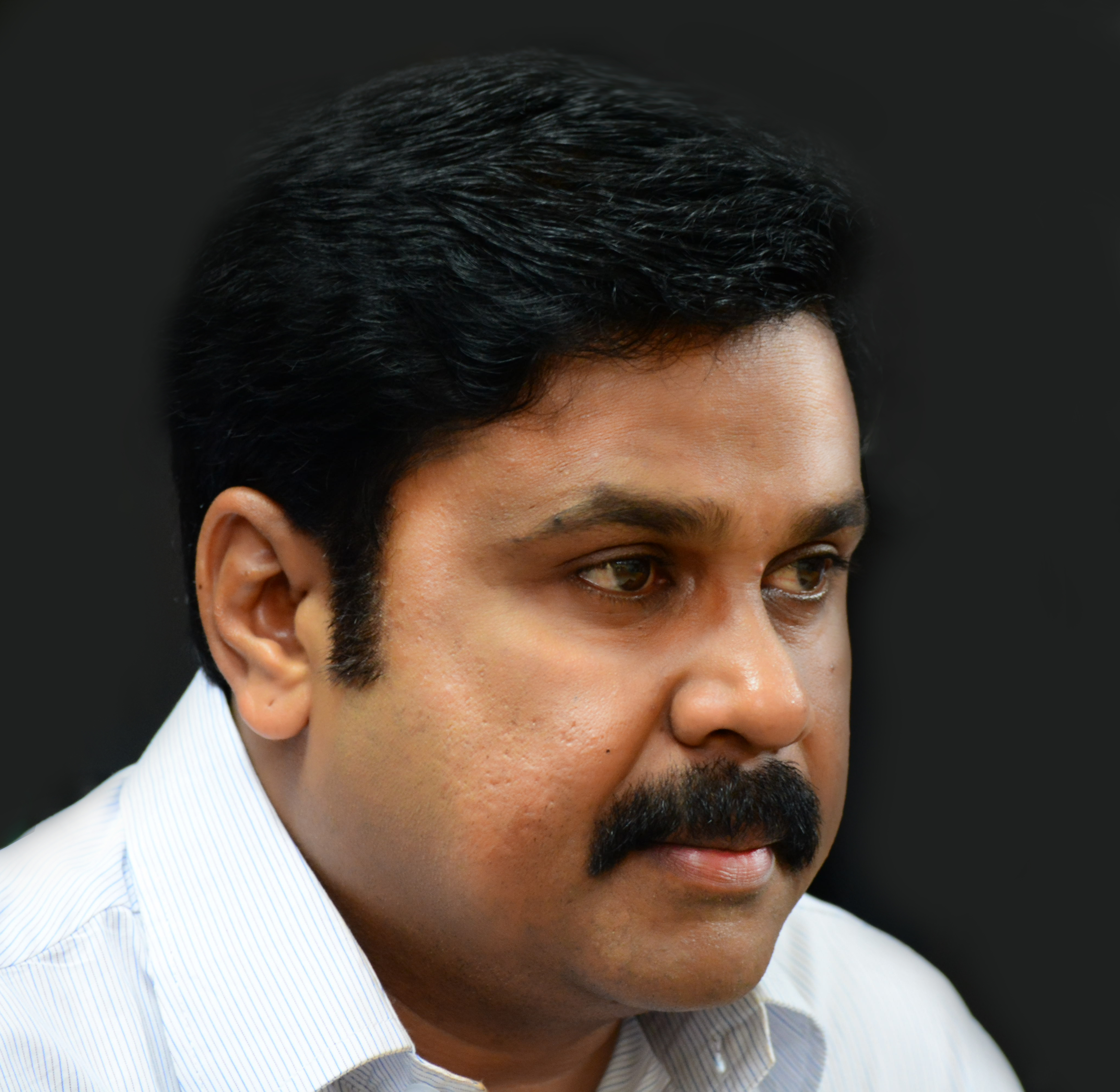
- Dileep in 2016
- Born: Gopalakrishnan Padmanabhan; 27 October 1967 (age 59); Edavanakkad, Ernakulam district, Kerala
- Education: Mahatma Gandhi University
- Occupations: Actor; producer; businessman
- Years active: 1991–present
- Works: Full list
- Spouses: Manju Warrier (m. 1998; div. 2015) Kavya Madhavan (m. 2016)
- Children: 2
- Awards: Kerala State Film Awards; Filmfare Awards South

Gopalakrishnan Padmanabhan, known by his moniker Dilieep or Dileep, is an Indian film actor, producer, dubbing artist and entrepreneur who predominantly works in the Malayalam cinema. He has acted in over 150 films and won several awards, including four Kerala State Film Awards and a Filmfare Awards South.

Beginning as a stage mimic, Dileep initially gained attention through the comedy audio series Dhe Maveli Kombathu and the television programmes Comicola and Cinemala on Asianet. He entered films as an assistant director to Kamal, beginning with Vishnulokam (1991), and made his acting debut with a minor role in Kamal's Ennodishtam Koodamo (1992). His first lead role came with Manathe Kottaram (1994), followed by breakthrough roles in Sallapam and Ee Puzhayum Kadannu in 1996, which established him as a bankable actor. By the late 1990s and early 2000s, he became widely known for slapstick comedies, such as Punjabi House (1998), Thenkasipattanam (2000), Darling Darling (2000), Ee Parakkum Thalika (2001), and Ishtam (2001).

The success of Meesha Madhavan (2002) elevated him to stardom and earned him the Filmfare Award for Best Actor – Malayalam. That year, he also received the Kerala State Film Award – Special Jury Award for Kunjikoonan, followed by a Special Mention for Chanthupottu (2005). In 2003, he launched his production company Graand Production, debuting with C.I.D. Moosa. He has also appeared in off-beat works such as Kathavaseshan (which he also produced and which won Second Best Film at the state awards) and Perumazhakkalam. In 2008, he produced Twenty:20 on behalf of AMMA, which became the highest-grossing Malayalam film at the time.

Dileep won the Kerala State Film Award for Best Actor for Vellaripravinte Changathi (2011). His later films Two Countries (2015) and Ramaleela (2017) each grossed over ₹50 crore and placed among the higher-grossing Malayalam films of their respective years. Outside films, he owns a multiplex theatre and restaurant chains.

== Early life and education ==
Dileep was born as Gopalakrishnan Padmanabhan at Edavanakad in the Ernakulam district of Kerala, to Padmanabhan Pillai and Sarojam on 27 October 1967. He is the eldest of three children.

Dileep attended Vidyadhiraja Vidya Bhavan School in Aluva, where he passed the tenth standard in 1985. He then joined the Union Christian College, Aluva, to complete his pre-degree during 1985–1987. Later, he pursued a degree in history from the Maharaja's College, Ernakulam.

It was during the time at Maharaja's College that he began taking impressionist acts seriously.

== Career ==
=== 1991–1999: From mimicry to cinema ===
Dileep began performing mimicry on stage after becoming an active member of the troupe Harisree. He later worked with other troupes as well, including Cochin Guinness. In the mid 2000s, Dileep, along with Nadirshah, created Dhe Maveli Kombathu, a comedy audio cassette series released annually during Onam. The series, which depicted Mahabali visiting Kerala, became a widespread success. Around the same time, Dileep began appearing on television through Asianet's comedy programmes Comicola and Cinemala.

With the support of actor Jayaram, Dileep entered the film industry as an assistant director to filmmaker Kamal, beginning with Vishnulokam (1991). His first task on set was operating the clapperboard for lead actor Mohanlal. He was credited on screen as "Dileep". Although he worked behind the camera, acting had always been his ambition, and he continued assisting Kamal on several films, including Ulladakkam (1991), Champakulam Thachan (1992), and Ghazal (1993). Dileep made his acting debut in a small role in Kamal's Ennodishtam Koodamo (1992) after a scheduled actor failed to appear. He gained further visibility with a supporting role in Sainyam.

Beginning his career with comic supporting parts, Dileep soon transitioned to leading roles that the media later characterised as "friendly, boy-next-door" portrayals. His first breakthrough came in the comedy-drama Manathe Kottaram (1994), in which he starred alongside Nadirshah, Harisree Ashokan, and Khushbu; the film achieved moderate commercial success. He continued in comic roles in films such as Three Men Army and Ezharakkoottam (both 1995)—the latter marking a turning point in his career and helping pave the way for future lead roles.

From 1996 onward, Dileep established himself as a successful leading actor. Impressed by his performance in Ezharakkoottam, director Sundar Das cast him as the lead in the drama Sallapam (1996), also featuring Manju Warrier. The film became a breakthrough for him as a hero and was followed later that year by Ee Puzhayum Kadannu (1996), directed by Kamal and featuring the same lead pair, which was also a commercial success. These films made the onscreen romantic duo popular, and the two would later marry in 1998. By the late 1990s and early 2000s, Dileep had achieved broad audience appeal, particularly through slapstick comedies. Film trade analyst Sreedhar Pillai observes that Dileep filled the gap in the slapstick-comedy market left by Mohanlal, who had moved away from the genre to focus on other kinds of roles.

He further cemented his bankability with films such as Manthra Mothiram (1997). The 1998 comedy Punjabi House was described in the media as his first "blockbuster". The film also marked the beginning of the comedy duo of Dileep and Harisree Ashokan. The 1999 film Chandranudikkunna Dikkil was Dileep's first collaboration with both Kavya Madhavan and director Lal Jose. Though not a commercial success, the pairing proved successful in their later films.

=== 2000–2009: Stardom ===
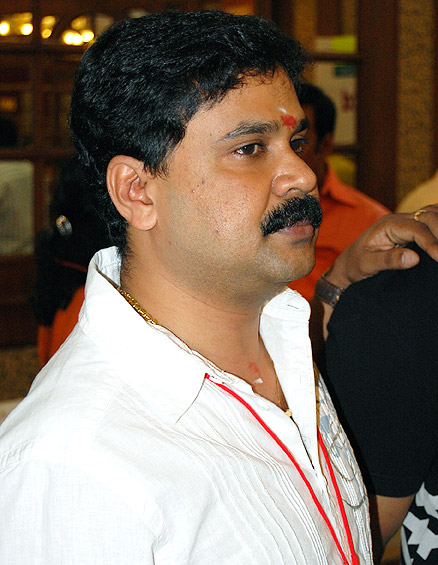
Dileep in 2008

His range as an actor gained recognition with Lohithadas' Joker (2000); filmmaker Lal Jose later noted that "the big names in the industry started realising his potential after his work in Lohithadas' Joker". By this time already a bankable lead, Dileep opted for a supporting comedic role in Thenkasipattanam headlined by Suresh Gopi and Lal—a performance that earned him appreciation. The film was also a major commercial success. He continued his success with films such as Darling Darling (2000), Ee Parakkum Thalika (2001), and Ishtam (2001).

In 2002, Dileep starred as a small-town thief in Lal Jose's Meesha Madhavan, which became the highest-grossing film of the year. The comedy-drama played a significant role in elevating his stardom. That same year, he portrayed a hunchback in Kunjikkoonan (2002), a box office success. The film earned him a Special Jury Award at the Kerala State Film Awards. His 2002 comedy Kalyanaraman also performed well at the box office. In February 2003, The Hindu noted that "the actor who went through a tough period earlier is now considered as the trump card for success in the industry". That year, he also debuted in Tamil cinema with Raajjiyam.

In 2003, his comedy Thilakkam with Kavya Madhavan was another commercial success. That year, Dileep founded his production house, Graand Productions. Its debut production, C.I.D. Moosa (2003), starring himself and directed by Johny Antony, turned out to be a commercial success.

In 2004, his action comedy Runway performed well at the box office. Rasikan, however, received a lukewarm reception from audiences. Priyadarshan's comedy Vettam failed commercially but went on to develop a cult following in later years. Dileep also ventured into off-beat cinema with the drama Kathavasheshan (2004), which he produced as well. The film won four Kerala State Film Awards, including Second Best Film. It was followed by the tragic drama Perumazhakkalam (2004), based on a real incident, in which he played a convict facing a death sentence. Nonetheless, in a 2005 interview, Dileep stated that he did not intend to move away from slapstick comedies, remarking, "I know my strengths and weaknesses".

In 2005, he starred in the commercially successful action entertainer Kochi Rajavu. The same year, he portrayed an effeminate man in Lal Jose' comedy Chanthupottu. His performance won him a Special Mention at the Kerala State Film Awards. The Hindu later highlighted Meesha Madhavan and Chanthupottu as "two of the most significant films in Dileep's career". In 2006, Sify.com described Dileep and Kavya Madhavan as "the most romantic pair in modern times ... the on-screen chemistry between the pair makes them the hottest pair in Malayalam".

Dileep is known for his belief in astrology and has often aimed to release his films on July 4. This practice began with Ee Parakkum Thalika and continued with Meesha Madhavan, C.I.D Moosa, and Pandippada. Ironically, his film July 4 (2007) missed the date by a day and failed at the box office. In 2008, he produced the multi-starrer Twenty:20 on behalf of the Association of Malayalam Movie Artists (AMMA), featuring almost every actor from the guild. The film became the highest-grossing Malayalam film at that time, grossing ₹31.4 crore.

=== 2010 – 2019 ===
In 2010 and 2011, Dileep appeared in several commercially successful films, including the comedies Bodyguard, Paappi Appacha, Kaaryasthan (his 100th film), Marykkundoru Kunjaadu and China Town, as well as the action film Christian Brothers. He also produced the successful Malarvadi Arts Club, which marked the debut of Vineeth Sreenivasan (directorial) and Nivin Pauly. His period drama Vellaripravinte Changathi (2011) earned him a Kerala State Film Award for Best Actor and was also a commercial success. He also appeared in Orma Mathram, a social drama about a missing child, scripted by C. V. Balakrishnan.

In 2012, Dileep's films collectively grossed ₹32.7 crore—the highest for any Malayalam actor that year. The year began with the failure of Spanish Masala, but Mayamohini became his highest grosser of the year. While Arike underperformed, My Boss was a commercial success, and Mr. Marumakan recovered its investment. Assessing the 2013 box office, The Hindu observed that "the unquestioned hero of the masses was Dileep ... some [films] were downright crass but they made the box office ring". The comedies Sound Thoma and Sringaravelan were his major theatrical successes, while Kammath and Kammath, Nadodimannan, and Ezhu Sundara Rathrikal turned profitable after accounting for satellite-rights revenue. Dileep remarked that "I am confused. If my films run, they are branded as brainless entertainers and if they fail to perform well, I am asked if I have lost my popularity!".

In 2014, Rafi-directed Ring Master received mixed reviews but performed well commercially. It was followed by Villali Veeran, which Khaleej Times noted "has not beaten box office records but if reports are to go by, it would not dent the producer’s pockets." That year, when The Hindu asked why his films "seldom get good reviews and mostly play to the gallery", Dileep replied that he prefers box office success over reviews. Similarly, Onmanorama observed that "it's an undeniable fact that the Dileep brand has grown to be the most salable entertainment product in the Malayalam entertainment market".

After the failure of Ivan Maryadaraman (2015), a remake of a Telugu film, Dileep announced that he was "done with remakes", stating that he would prefer original scripts "instead of wasting my time with remakes". His immediate release Chandrettan Evideya was a commercial success, but the subsequent films Love 24x7 and Life of Josutty "could not woo the box office in a major way". The year concluded with Two Countries, which became one of the highest-grossing Malayalam films till then. He followed it with another commercial success, the slapstick comedy King Liar (2016). He paired with Kavya Madhavan in Adoor Gopalakrishnan's drama Pinneyum. Sundar Das' Welcome to Central Jail, arrived alongside five other films, with The New Indian Express noting that "all the six films recorded good collection during the Onam days".

Dileep's first release of 2017 was Georgettan's Pooram, a kabaddi-themed sports drama, which Deccan Chronicle described as "an above average family entertainer". He followed it with Ramaleela, a political thriller directed by debutant Arun Gopy, in which he played a politician on the run. Released during his judicial custody, the film opened to positive reviews, and became his second film to gross above ₹50 crore after Two Countries. He next appeared in Kammara Sambhavam (2018). The period thriller centred on the contested legacy of Kammaran during the freedom struggle.

In Kodathi Samaksham Balan Vakeel (2019), he portrayed a lawyer with a stammer. The film was a commercial success. A tonal shift followed with Subharathri, where Dileep played a key supporting role; the drama-thriller received positive reviews, particularly for his performance. He subsequently co-starred with Arjun Sarja in the action film Jack & Daniel, which reviewer Anna M. M. Vetticad described as "silly, unoriginal but tolerable timepass". His Christmas film My Santa earned positive reviews.

=== 2020 – present ===
Between 2020 and 2022, Dileep had no major theatrical releases apart from Thattassery Koottam, which he produced and appeared in briefly. His 2021 film Keshu Ee Veedinte Nadhan, directed by longtime friend Nadirshah, premiered directly on Disney+ Hotstar. In the comedy-drama, he played an elderly man who wins a lottery, a film Moneycontrol.com described as part of a "comedy that goes beyond language".

In 2023, he produced and co-starred in with Joju George in Voice of Sathyanathan. Despite unfavourable reviews, it grossed over ₹23 crore in four weeks. He stars in Arun Gopy-directed Bandra which incurred loss and received widespread negative reviews, with the producer alleging review bombing. In 2024, Dileep starred in Thankamani, a crime thriller based on a 1986 incident, which failed critically and commercially. He then produced and acted in Pavi Caretaker, described by Hindustan Times as reminiscent of his earlier slapstick roles.

In Prince and Family (2025), he played a modest man whose life takes a turn after marrying a spirited social media influencer. Despite receiving mixed reviews, the film became a box office success. His next release was Bha Bha Ba, in which he stars alongside Vineeth Sreenivasan and Dhyan Sreenivasan.

== Personal life ==
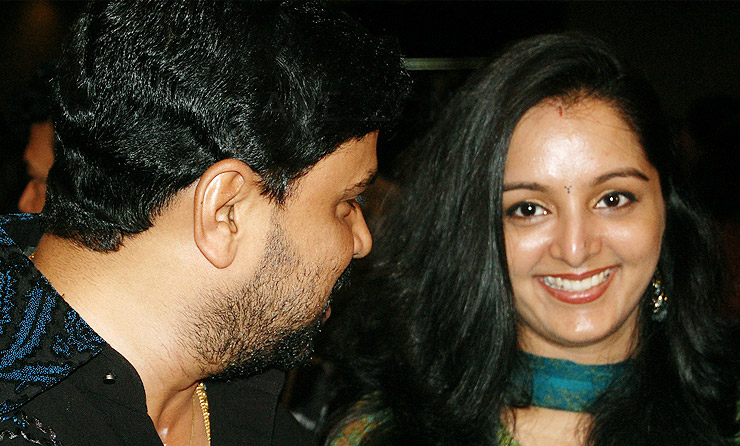
Dileep with Manju Warrier attending a function

Dileep married actress Manju Warrier on 20 October 1998; their daughter, Meenakshi, was born in 2000. In July 2014, the couple filed for divorce which was granted on 31 January 2015. Their daughter stays with Dileep. On 25 November 2016, Dileep married actress Kavya Madhavan. The couple have a daughter born in 2018.

== Media image ==
He was popularly called 'Janapriya Nayakan' (transl. popular hero) by delivering consecutive hits which entertained the audience of all ages. The 2019 film Shibu told the story of an ardent fan of Dileep who wants to make a film with him.

== Legal issues and allegations ==
On 28 June 2017, Dileep was questioned by the Kerala Police in connection with the abduction and sexual assault of actress Bhavana on 17 February 2017. On 10 July 2017, he was arrested on allegations of conspiracy and was remanded by the court. Following his arrest, various film organisations revoked his membership. Protests were held by political parties against Dileep, and his business establishments, including the Dhe Puttu restaurant and the D Cinemaas multiplex, were vandalised. On 3 October 2017, the Kerala High Court granted him conditional bail. In June 2018, Dileep filed a petition in the Kerala High Court alleging that the Kerala Police had deliberately framed him and requesting that the investigation be transferred to the Central Bureau of Investigation (CBI).

Dileep filed an additional plea for accessing video footage of the incident. The plea was denied by both the Angamaly Magistrate Court and the Kerala High Court. Mukul Rohatgi represented him in the case. In October 2018, Dileep was granted bail by the Kerala High Court. In April 2019, the Government of Kerala froze charges against him until the court had given an independent verdict on the case. In May 2019, the Supreme Court stayed his trial until his plea for footage was considered. On 30 November, the court turned down his plea, rather allowed to inspect its content, or have a second opinion as to whether the video is genuine.

In December 2021, film director Balachandra Kumar gave an interview to a news channel in which he alleged that he had witnessed conversations—purportedly involving Dileep—about influencing witnesses, harming police officers involved in the investigation, and the alleged possession of the assault video. He also claimed he had audio recordings of these conversations. Based on these claims, Kerala police registered a new case against Dileep for alleged conspiracy to assault investigating officers. On 7 February 2022, Dileep and others were granted anticipatory bail by Kerala High Court in the case.

The trial, which began on 8 March 2018 at a sessions court in Ernakulam, lasted eight years. On 8 December 2025, the Ernakulam Principal District and Sessions Court delivered its verdict, acquitting Dileep of all charges.

== Other work ==
Dileep owned the multiplex theater complex D Cinemaas situated in Chalakudy when it opened in December 2014. Dileep owns Dhe Puttu, a restaurant chain with branches in Kerala and the Middle East.

== Playback singing ==
Playback singing

Song	Film	Year	Lyrics	Composer
"Theme Music"	Chandranudikkunna Dikhil	1999	S. Ramesan Nair	Vidyasagar
"Onnaam Malakerii"	Kalyanaraman	2002	Kaithapram Damodaran	Berny-Ignatius
"Saare Saare"	Thilakkam	2003	Kaithapram Damodaran	Kaithapram Damodaran
"Manmadanalle"	Inspector Garud	2007		Alex Paul
"Kandaal Njaanoru"	Sound Thoma	2013	Nadirshah	Gopi Sunder
"Ashakoshale Pennundo"	Sringaravelan	2013	Nadirshah	Berny-Ignatius
"Naranga Mittayi"	Keshu Ee Veedinte Nadhan	2022	Sajesh Hari	Nadirshah

== Awards ==
=== Kerala State Film Awards ===
At the Kerala State Film Awards:

- 2002: Special Jury Award – Kunjikoonan
- 2004: Second Best Film – Kathavasheshan (producer)
- 2005: Special Mention – Chanthupottu
- 2011: Best Actor – Vellaripravinte Changathi

=== Asianet Film Awards ===
At Asianet Film Awards:

- 2002: Best Actor – Kunjikoonan
- 2004: Special Jury Award – Kathavasheshan
- 2008: Best Film – Twenty:20
- 2010: Most Popular Actor – Body Guard
- 2013: Award of Excellence for completing 20 years in Malayalam film industry

=== Kerala Film Critics Association Awards ===
At Kerala Film Critics Association Awards:

- 2001: Best Supporting Actor, in Joker
- 2004: Best Actor – Kadhavaseshan
- 2005: Best Actor – Chanthupottu

=== Jaihind Film Awards ===
- 2010: Most Popular Actor Award
- 2011: Chalachitra Pratibha Award
- 2012: Best Actor – Mayamohini, Arike
- 2013: Most Popular Actor Award
- 2014: Most Popular Actor Award

=== Other awards ===
- 2002: Filmfare Awards South, Best Actor in Malayalam – Meesha Madhavan
- 2010: Amrita Film Awards, Most Popular Actor Award
- 2013: Vanitha Film Awards, Best Popular Actor
- 2014: South Indian International Movie Awards, Best Actor – Sound Thoma
