= Kerala Film Critics Association Award for Best Supporting Actress =

Annual Indian film award

The Kerala Film Critics Association Award for Best Supporting Actress is an award presented annually at the Kerala Film Critics Association Awards. It recognises an outstanding performance by an actress in a supporting role in a Malayalam film. The award was instituted in 2019 and succeeded the Kerala Film Critics Association Award for Second Best Actress which was awarded between the years 1979 and 2018.

The following list includes the winners of both the Best Supporting Actress and Second Best Actress awards.

== Second Best Actress (1979 – 2018) ==
Year	Recipient	Film	Ref.
1979	Sukumari	Ezhu Nirangal	
1980	Jalaja	Shalini Ente Koottukari	
1981	K. P. A. C. Lalitha	Chaatta	
1982	Sukumari	Chiriyo Chiri	
1983	Shubha	Lekhayude Maranam Oru Flashback	
1984	Kaviyoor Ponnamma	Mukhamukham, Oru Painkilikatha	
1985	Sukumari	Arappatta Kettiya Gramathil	
1986	Shari	Namukku Parkkan Munthirithoppukal	
1987	Parvathy	Oru Minnaminunginte Nurunguvettam, Amrutham Gamaya	
1988	T. P. Radhamani	Season	
1989	Sithara	Vachanam, Purappadu	
1990	K. P. A. C. Lalitha	Amaram, Gajakesariyogam	
1991	Philomina	Godfather	
1992	Shanthi Krishna	Savidham	
1993	Kaviyoor Ponnamma	Chenkol	
1994	Maathu	Pradakshinam, Samudhayam	
1995	Annie	Mazhayethum Munpe, Kalyanji Anandji	
1996	Kaveri	Udhyanapalakan	
1997	Sreelakshmi	Bhoothakkannadi	
1998	Sangita	Chinthavishtayaya Shyamala	
1998	Baby Shalini	Kaikudunna Nilavu	
1999	Kavya Madhavan	Chandranudikkunna Dikkil	
2000	Chippy	Kattu Vannu Vilichappol	
2001	Bindu Panicker	Soothradharan	
2002	Jyothirmayi	Bhavam	
2003	Kavya Madhavan	Mizhi Randilum, Gaurisankaram	
2004	Ambika	Annorikkal	
2005	Shobha Mohan	Chanthupottu	
2006	Mohini	Ammathottil	
2007	Parvathy	Flash	
2008	Priyanka	Vilapangalkkappuram	
2009	Shwetha Menon	Madhya Venal, Paleri Manikyam: Oru Pathirakolapathakathinte Katha	
2010	Samvrutha Sunil	Happy Husbands, Gramam, Punyam Aham	
2011	Lena	Traffic, Athe Mazha Athe Veyil	
2012	Mamta Mohandas	Celluloid, My Boss	
2013	Mallika	Kathaveedu	
2014	Bhama	Ottamandaram, Naku Penta Naku Taka	
2015	Lena	Ennu Ninte Moideen	
2016	Surabhi Lakshmi	Minnaminungu	
2017	Aishwarya Lekshmi	Mayaanadhi	
2018	Ineya	Pengalila, Parole	

== Best Supporting Actress (2019 – present) ==
Year	Recipient	Film	Ref.
2019	Swasika	Vasanthi	
2020	Mamitha Baiju	Kho-Kho	
2021	Manju Pillai	Home	
2022	Hannah Reji Koshy	Kooman	
2022	Garggi Ananthan	Ekan Anekan	
