= Sachin (film) =

2019 Malayalam film

- Theatrical release poster
- Directed by: Santhosh Nair
- Written by: S. L. Puram Jayasurya
- Produced by: Jude Agnel Sudhir; Juby Ninan
- Starring: Dhyan Sreenivasan; Anna Rajan; Aju Varghese
- Cinematography: Neil D'Cunha
- Edited by: Ranjan Abraham
- Music by: Shaan Rahman
- Production company: JJ Productions
- Distributed by: E4 Entertainment
- Release date: 19 July 2019
- Country: India
- Language: Malayalam

Sachin is a 2019 Indian Malayalam-language romantic comedy film directed by Santhosh Nair and written by S. L. Puram Jayasurya. It stars Dhyan Sreenivasan, Anna Rajan, Aju Varghese, Hareesh Kanaran, Renji Panicker, Ramesh Pisharody, Appani Sarath, Maniyanpilla Raju, Maala Parvati, Aabid Nassar, Reshmi Boban and Sethu Lakshmi. Sachin is a romance film in the backdrop of cricket. The story revolves around a boy who was born on the auspicious day when cricketer Sachin Tendulkar hit century. After watching Sachin's performance, Viswanathan (Raju) got excited and named his son as Sachin. The film was released on 19 July 2019.

== Premise ==
Sachin is born on an auspicious day when the nation celebrated Sachin Tendulkar. Excited after watching Sachin's performance, Viswanathan promptly named his new born son "Sachin". Sachin too played cricket while growing up and his love for Sachin Tendulkar was unflinching. Meanwhile, Sachin falls in love with Anjali, a village damsel who is four years elder to him. (it can be recalled that Anjali, wife of Sachin Tendulkar too is elder than him) Later on, trouble brew in and their wedding get cancelled. how Sachin resolve the issues forms the rest of the story.

== Cast ==
- Dhyan Sreenivasan as Sachin Vishawanathan
- Aju Varghese as Kokachi Jerry/Jerry Thomas
- Anna Rajan as Anjali Ramachandran
- Hareesh Kanaran as Poocha Shyju
- Appani Sarath as Kaduva Jose
- Ramesh Pisharody as Shine Ramachandran
- Renji Panicker as Ramachandran
- Maniyanpilla Raju as Viswanathan
- Juby Ninan as Naveen
- Sethu Lakshmi as Sarojam
- Reshmi Boban as Radhamani
- Maala Parvati as Devika
- Firoz Azeez as Cricket match commander
- Aabid Nassar as Sali
- Kochu Preman
- Balaji Sarma
- Manoj
- Elisabeth
- Arun Raj
- Yadhu Krishna
- Valsala Menon
- Lija

== Production ==
Sachin is directed by Santhosh Nair, written by S. L. Puram Jayasurya and produced by Jude Agnel Sudhir and Juby Ninan under the banner JJ Productions. Cinematographer is Neil D'Cunha, editor is Ranjan Abhraham. Sachin is Santhosh Nair's second film after Money Ratnam.

The pooja function took place at Beaumond Hotel in Kochi. Renji Panicker made the switch-on and Alwin Antony made the first clap. The main shooting location of the film are Punlaur, Pathnapuram, Thenmala.

== Soundtrack ==
Music is composed by Shaan Rahman for the lyrics of Manu Manjith.
