= Mohabbathin Kunjabdulla =

2019 Malayalam film

- Directed by: Shanu Samath
- Written by: Shanu Samath
- Produced by: Sajeesh Manjery
- Starring: Indrans; Balu Varghese; Rachana Narayanankutty; Anjali Nair
- Cinematography: Ansoor P.M
- Edited by: V.T Sreejith
- Music by: Sajan K Ram; Kozhikode Aboobacker; Hesham Abdul Wahab
- Release date: 23 August 2019
- Running time: 134 minutes
- Country: India
- Language: Malayalam

Mohabbathin Kunjabdulla is a 2019 Malayalam film directed by Shanu Samath and produced by Benazir Abdul Nazeer. The lead role of the movie was supposed to do by K T C Abdulla. Due to his sudden demise, Indrans was given the lead role.

== Synopsis ==
Kunjabdulla left everything behind including his hometown and childhood sweetheart and shifted to Mumbai. After a long time, at an age of 65, he feels like visiting his hometown and his girl and decided to go back to his hometown in Kerala. He meets several people during his journey and changes their lives forever. The movie climax shows, why actually Kunjabdulla left the home during his childhood.

== Cast ==
- Indrans as Kunjabdullah
- Balu Varghese as Mohammed
- Rachana Narayanankutty
- Premkumar as Autoriksha Driver
- Anjali Nair as Crying Baby Boy's Mother
- Renji Panicker as Thangal
- Lal Jose
- Sreejith Ravi
- Nandana Varma
- Renny Johnson as Rev Fr. George Idezhath
- Parvathi T as Mohammed's Mother
- Ambika
- Valsala Menon
- Binu Adimali as Bus Passenger
- Noby Marcose
- Ullas Panthalam
- Idavela Babu
- Kochu Preman as Grocery Shop Owner
- Tosh Christy
- Jenson Alapatt
- Savithri Sreedharan
- Sneha Divakar
- Anu Joseph

== Reception ==
Times of India gave the movie a rating of 2.5 out of 5.
