= Juby Ninan =

Indian actor

- ജൂബി നൈനാൻ
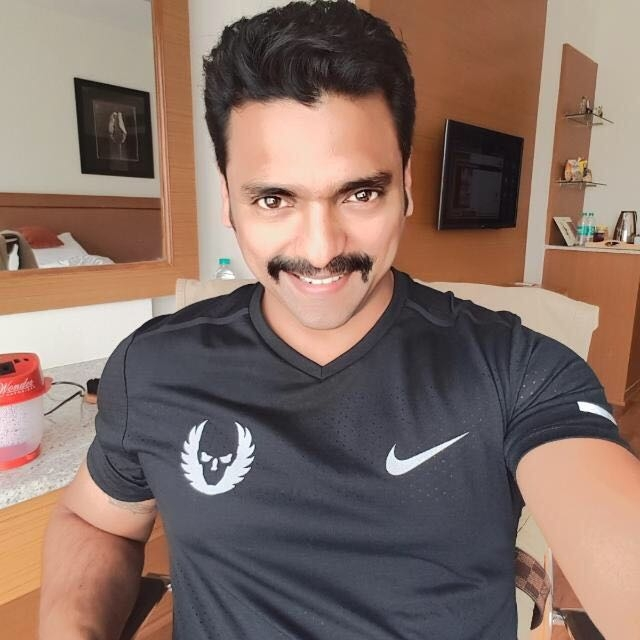
- Born: Kottayam, Kerala, India
- Occupation: Actor
- Years active: 2013–present
- Known for: Dum (2016)

Juby Ninan is an Indian actor who works in Malayalam films. He made his film debut in Persiakaran (2014). Ninan was noticed as the leading antagonist in the 2016 action film Dum, starring Lal and Shine Tom Chacko.

== Film career ==
Juby Ninan was among many newcomers selected for the film Pershiakkaran, a film that discussed the complexities of life in the fast-paced world of Dubai. Ninan later appeared in Smart Boys and Aadu Thomaa. Film industry noticed him only after his antagonist role in Dum.

Juby Ninan later done Ore Mugham directed by Sajith Jaganathan co-starring Dhyan Sreenivasan and Parole with Mammootty.

== Filmography ==
Key
†	Denotes films that have not yet been released

- All films are in Malayalam language unless otherwise noted.

Year	Film	Role	Notes
2014	Persiakaran		
2015	Aadu Thomaa		
2016	Smart Boys		
2016	Dum	Duttan	
2016	Ore Mukham		
2018	Parole	Rajkumar	
2019	Sachin	Naveen	Also producer
2019	Jack & Daniel	Club Master	
TBA	Rangeela †	TBA	
