= Jagannathan (actor) =

Indian actor

- Born: 1938; Changanassery, Kingdom of Travancore, British India (present day Kottayam, Kerala, India)
- Died: 8 December 2012 (aged 73–74); Poojappura, Kerala, India
- Occupation: Actor
- Spouse: Saraswathi Amma
- Children: 2

Jagannathan (1938 – 8 December 2012) was an Indian actor who worked in Malayalam cinema.

== Biography ==
Jagannathan was born to Sekharan Nair in Changanassery in 1938. He did his primary education from Thuravoor L.P School, Vaikom Government School. He got training from Rashtriya Anushasan Yojan at Rajasthan and won first rank in it. He worked as an instructor at L.D.S Training Institute, Indore, Madhya Pradesh for four years. He also worked as a Physical Education Officer at Neyattinkara Government High School, St. Joseph's High School, Thiruvananthapuram, Poojappura Government High School and at Javahar Bal Bhavan, Thiruvananthapuram. He held posts as Government Welfare Officer and Govenernment Sports Director Administrator.

== Career ==
He was an active member of the Malayalam theatre scene along with G. Aravindan and Nedumudi Venu. He played the noted character of Aattappandaram in the play Avanavan Kadamba written by Kavalam Narayana Panicker and directed by Aravindan. Jagannathan also directed four plays: Pathanam, Parivarthanam, Karadi and Vivahalochana.

Jagannathan's film debut was in Oridathu (1986), directed by Aravindan. He acted in over 100 Malayalam films. Ardhanaari (2012) was his last film to be released before his death. Jagannathan also played roles in many television serials, including Kairalivilasam Lodge, which made him popular among Malayali households.

== Personal life ==
He was married to Saraswathi Amma. The couple have a daughter Rohini, and a son Chandrasekharan. Malayalam television serial director Sivamohan Thampi is his son-in-law.

Jagannathan died on 8 December 2012 at his home in Poojappura in Thiruvananthapuram, Kerala.

== Filmography ==
1. Pooram
2. Gramathil Ninnu (1978) not released
3. Oridathu (1986)
4. Theetham (1986)
5. Swathi Thirunal (1987) as Vadivelu
6. Sruthi (1987) as Achuthan Marar
7. Puravrutham (1988) as Toddy shopkeeper
8. Dasharatham (1989) as Sankaran Nair
9. Chanakyan (1989) as Madhava Menon's Aide
10. Utharam (1989) as Subrahmaniam
11. Artham (1989) as Bookshop Owner
12. Swagatham (1989) Vallabhai
13. Mazhavilkavadi (1989) as Ubaid
14. Appu (1990) as Thamarakshan
15. Samrajyam (1990) as Lakshmi's Father
16. Kottayam Kunjachan (1990) as Mathayi
17. Marupuram (1990)
18. Nale Ennundenkil (1990)
19. Vachanam (1990)
20. Souhrdam (1990) as Krishnan
21. Thudarkadha (1991) as Sankarankutty
22. Koodikazhcha (1991) as Eenthapurayil Eenasu
23. Aanaval Mothiram (1991) as Annie's Father
24. Kadalora Kattu (1991) as Aouthakutty
25. Oru Prathyeka Ariyippu (1991) as Dasappan
26. Aham (1992)
27. Soorya Chakram (1992)
28. Kingini (1992)
29. Kunukkitta Kozhi
30. Addehamenna Iddeham
31. Pattanathil Sundaran
32. Simhavaalan Menon
33. Rajashilpi (1992)
34. Ezhunnallathu
35. Soorya Gayathri (1992) as Ramanathan
36. Aayirappara (1993) as Chandrabhanu
37. Pravachakan (1993) as Chackochan
38. Devasuram (1993) as Poduval
39. Thiruda Thuruda (1993) - Tamil as Astrologer
40. Pidakkozhi Koovunna Noottandu (1994) as Venkiti
41. Avittam Thirunaal Aarogya Sriman (1995) as Sukumara Pillai
42. Thacholi Varghese Chekavar (1995)
43. Manthrikante Pravu (1995)
44. Mayooranritham (1996)
45. Kalyana Unnikal (1997)
46. The Truth (1998)
47. Stalin Sivadas (1999) as Keshava Pilla
48. Jeevan Masai (2001) as Shasthrikal
49. Sravu (2001) as Kochayyappan
50. Thenthulli (2001)
51. Adheena (2002)
52. Videsi Nair Swadesi Nair as Fr. Idikkula
53. Ente Hridayathinte Udama (2002)
54. Punarjani (2003)
55. Pattanathil Sundaran (2003) as Gopalakrishnan Nair
56. Oru Pennum Randanum (2008)
57. Pakal Nakshathrangal (2008)
58. Patham Nilayile Theevandi (2009)
59. Ardhanaari (2012)

== TV serials ==
- Oridathorikkal
- Kathasamgamam
- Pattolaponnu
- Chamayam
- Take 4 OK
- Mookkuthiyum Manchadiyum
- Panthirukulam
- Tharattu
- School Diary
- Draupadi
- Kairalivilasam Lodge (Doordarshan)
- Kadamattathu Kathanar (Asianet)
- Mandan Kunju (Doordarshan)
- Vaitharani
- chandrodayam (Doordarshan)
- Punnakka Vikasana Corporation (Doordarshan)
- Ara Nazhika Neram (Amrita TV)
- Vikramadithyan (Asianet)
- Sneham (Surya)

== Awards ==
- Kerala State Theatre Award for the second best actor (1985) - Aayiram Katham Akale
- Kerala State Award for the best supporting actor in a television serial (1999) - School Diary, Draupadi
