= Nelson Sooranad =

Indian actor and comedian

- Citizenship: Indian
- Occupations: Actor; Comedian
- Years active: 2010 - present

Nelson Sooranad, professionally known as Nelson, is an Indian actor and comedian who works in Malayalam film industry. He is widely known for his role in Romans, Spanish Masala and Aadu series.

== Career ==
He started his career as a comedian contestant on popular TV program Comedy Stars on Asianet channel.

His debut film was Thaskara Lahala.

== Filmography ==
Year	Title	Role	Notes	Ref.
2010	Thaskara Lahala	Perunkulam Biju	Debut film	
2011	Pachuvum Kovalanum	Kuttappan		
2012	Spanish Masala	Pappan		
2012	Husbands in Goa	Waiter in a hotel		
2013	Romans	Geevarghese		
2013	Black Butterfly	Kanjavu Vasu		
2013	Om Shanti Oshana	Police		
2013	Kutteem Kolum	Shashi		
2013	72 Model	Joseph		
2013	Money Back Policy	Bus passenger	Cameo	
2014	Rajadhiraja	Sasi		
2015	Aadu	Dragon Paili		
2015	Oru Second Class Yathra	Cleaner in lorry		
2015	Nee-Na	Drunkard		
2015	Female Unnikrishnan			
2016	Hello Namasthe	Tree Cutter		
2016	Angane Thanne Nethave Anjettennam Pinnale	Thambikkuttan Bhagavathar		
2016	Marubhoomiyile Aana	Velichapadu		
2016	Dum	Freek Ravi		
2017	Mannamkattayum Kariyilayum			
2017	Sherlock Toms	Paanchi		
2017	Overtake			
2017	Aadu 2	Dragon Paili		
2018	Ira	Police Constable Venkidi		
2018	Vikadakumaran	Sindhu’s father		
2019	Irupathiyonnaam Noottaandu	Homestay cook		
2019	Isakkinte Ithihasam			
2019	Freakens			
2022	King Fish	Peeli		
2023	Apposthalanmarude Pravarthikal	Lukkochan		
2024	Pinnil Oral			
2026	Aadu 3	Dragon Paili		
