= Mahalakshmi Sarveshwaran =

Indian actress

- Born: Nilgiris, Tamil Nadu, India
- Occupations: Actress; dancer
- Years active: 2003–2017

Mahalakshmi Sarveshwaran is an Indian actress and dancer who primarily works in Malayalam language films and television shows.

== Career ==
She studied at Carmel Girls' Higher Secondary School and practiced Bharatanatyam and Kuchipudi while in school. She worked as a child artiste in Thilakkam (2003) and Pattanathil Sundaran (2003). She made her lead debut with Ardhanaari (2012). She also played the lead in the television serial Sivakami on Surya TV.

== Personal life ==
She married Nirmal Krishna on 15 December 2019.

== Filmography ==
- All films are in Malayalam, unless otherwise noted.

Year	Film	Role	Notes	Ref.
2003	Thilakkam		Child artist	
2003	Pattanathil Sundaran	Pillai's daughter	Child artist	
2011	Vellaripravinte Changathi	Oppana Dancer	Special appearance	
2012	Ardhanaari	Kokila		
2012	Ezham Suryan	Gopika		
2013	Memories	Vimala Menon		
2014	Kathai Thiraikathai Vasanam Iyakkam	Deepa / Roopa	Tamil film	
2014	Test Paper	Poornima		
2015	Female Unnikrishnan	Gowri		

== Television ==
Year	Series	Role	Channel	Notes	Ref.
2009	Kunjali Marakkar		Asianet		
2009	Ulladakkam		Amrita TV		
2010	Autograph	Nandana	Asianet		
2010	Swamiye Saranamayyappa		Surya TV		
2011	Sreekrishnan		Surya TV	Cameo appearance in title song	
2012	Ramayanam		Mazhavil Manorama		
2012	Veera Marthanda Varma		Surya TV		
2015–2016	Sivakami		Surya TV		
2016–2017	Moonu Pennungal	Gerly	Surya TV		

TV shows

- Tharolsavam - Reality show
- Sree Kaleeswari - album
- Don't Do Don't Do - Game Show
- Saregama - Game Show
- Ningalkkumakam Super Chef
- Munch Stars
