= Rangeela (upcoming film) =

Upcoming Indian Malayalam-language film

- Directed by: Santhosh Nair
- Screenplay by: Sanil Abraham
- Story by: Jayalal Menon
- Produced by: Jayalal Menon
- Starring: Sunny Leone
- Cinematography: Neil D' Cunha
- Edited by: Ranjan Abraham
- Music by: a Haritha Balakrishnan
- Production company: Backwater Studios
- Distributed by: One World Entertainment
- Country: India
- Language: Malayalam

Rangeela is an upcoming Indian Malayalam-language film Directed by Santhosh Nair. The film stars Sunny Leone in her debut lead role in Malayalam cinema, co-starring Salim Kumar, Johny Antony, Sujith Raj Kochukunju, Krrish Menon, Major Ravi, Jacob Gregory and Ramesh Pisharody in significant roles. It is produced by Jayalal Menon under his production banner Backwater Studios. Principal photography of the film commenced on 1 February 2019 in Goa.

== Cast ==
- Sunny Leone
- Salim Kumar
- Aju Varghese
- Johny Antony
- Major Ravi
- Jacob Gregory
- Ramesh Pisharody
- Sujith Raj Kochukunju
- Sudheer Sukumaran
- Krrish Menon

== Production ==
The film marks Sunny Leone's debut film in Malayalam Film Industry and plays the main lead role in the film. The film kicked offshoot in Goa on 1 February 2019 with the portions and scenes shot relating to Sunny Leone.
