= Padagasalai =

- Directed by: J. Tamil
- Written by: J. Tamil
- Produced by: D. Anil
- Starring: Satya; Aravind; R. Sanjay; Sivanandam; Iniya; Preethi Pushpan
- Cinematography: J. Tamil
- Edited by: Murugaram
- Music by: Hitesh
- Production company: Devavijayam Film Makers
- Release date: 26 March 2010
- Running time: 135 minutes
- Country: India
- Language: Tamil

Padagasalai (transl. Auditorium) is a 2010 Indian Tamil language drama film directed by J. Tamil. The film stars Satya, Aravind, R. Sanjay, Iniya and Preethi Pushpan, with Scissor Manohar, Bonda Mani, Raja Sethu Murali, Sulur Shanmugadevan and Sivanandam playing supporting roles. The film, produced by D. Anil, had musical score by Hitesh and was released on 26 March 2010.

== Plot ==
Melkattapattu and Keelkattapattu, two small villages near Karaikudi, are in conflict after a clash that happened twenty years ago. The elders of both villages hate each other, whereas the youngsters act like they are enemies but are good friends and want the conflict to end. Muthu (Satya), Pugazh (Aravind) and Madhumitha (Meenakshi) who are from different villages study in the same college and are friends, while the politician's son Vijay (R. Sanjay) adds fuel to the fire in the conflict. Thereafter, their college organized a NSS camp and the newly joined student Abirami (Iniya) joins them. During the camp, Pugazh falls in love with Abirami and he proposes his love, but Abirami declines despite having a crush on him. Abirami turns out to be the daughter of Devaraj and Devi.

In the past, Devaraj and Devi, who were from Melkattapattu and Keelkattapattu, fell in love with each other. Most of the villagers supported their love but a few ones tried to stop the marriage. During a kabaddi match, the Melkattapattu's team and the Keelkattapattu's team had a violent fight and they started to hate each other afterwards. Devaraj and Devi had no choice but to elope.

When Muthu and Pugazh come to know about Abirami's true identity, they decide to fight for marrying her and the villages are in for another split. So the villagers try to solve the problem by arranging a kabaddi match and the winner of the match will marry Abirami. Vijay doesn't want the villagers to live peacefully so he has a brutal fight with Muthu and Pugazh, and they beat Vijay up. Pugazh wins the match and Muthu genuinely accepts his defeat and marries his relative Malar(Preethi Pushpan). The film ends with the villagers making peace and living in harmony.

The film provides a message against caste and village rivalry existing in most of the villages in Tamil Nadu. Love is the only solution for this unwanted rivalry between persons/villages/states/countries.

== Cast ==
- Satya as Muthu (Muthukumar)
- Aravind as Pugazh (Pugazhendhi)
- R. Sanjay as Vijay
- Iniya as Abirami
- Preethi Pushpan as Malar
- Meenakshi as Madhumitha
- Scissor Manohar as Sudalai
- Bonda Mani as Canteen manager
- Raja Sethu Murali
- Sulur Shanmugadevan
- Sivanandam as Kunjumani
- Susi Rathinam
- Ayappan
- Thirupathi

== Production ==
Anil Dev(Anil.D) is the producer of this movie. He is a writer-director-producer located in Vadapalani, Chennai. He is from Kerala and his first movie is Dalamarmarangal(Malayalam)/Ithalkalin Oasai(Tamil). J.Tamil made his directorial debut with Paadagasalai under the banner Devavijayam Film Makers and he had also handled the camera. Newcomers Satya, Aravind and R. Zanjay were selected to play the lead roles. Iniya, who hailed from Kerala, made her acting debut in Tamil cinema with this film under the name of Shruthi and Preethi Pushpan was cast to play one of the heroines. Hitesh had composed the music while stunts were by Thalapathy Dinesh and editing by Murugaram. This movie is shot in Thirupathur, Yelagiri, Jwalaarpet, Kaaraikudi and in Trivandrum.

== Soundtrack ==
Padagasalai

Soundtrack album by Hitesh
- Released: 18 February 2010
- Recorded: 2010
- Genre: Feature film soundtrack
- Length: 23:59
- Producer: Hitesh

The film score and the soundtrack were composed by Hitesh. The soundtrack features 6 tracks with lyrics written by Udumalai Karisal Muthu, P. K. Shivashri and Kovai Mustafa. The audio was released on 18 February 2010 in Chennai. Actor Prasanna, Kalaipuli G. Sekaran, V. C. Guhanathan and P. L. Thenappan attended the audio launch. S. R. Ashok Kumar of The Hindu called the album "passable".

Tracklist
No.	Title	Lyrics	Singer(s)	Length
1.	"Uyirin Uyirey"	Udumalai Karisal Muthu	Madhu Balakrishnan, Anu	4:57
2.	"Nilavo Paniyo"	P. K. Shivashri	Mukesh, Priyadarshini	4:43
3.	"Saalai Indha Saalai"	Udumalai Karisal Muthu	Siddarth	2:49
4.	"Angala Amanukku"	Udumalai Karisal Muthu	Mukesh	4:35
5.	"Konjum Kumari"	Udumalai Karisal Muthu	Karthik	4:35
6.	"Theru Koothu"	Kovai Mustafa	Kovai Mustafa	3:40
Total length:				23:59

== Release ==
The film was released on 26 March 2010 alongside Vasanthabalan's Angadi Theru.

=== Critical reception ===
The New Indian Express wrote, "the time-tried plot, coupled with a decade-old style of presentation, just doesn't give the film a chance to take off". Dinamalar criticised the film for its weak direction and poor screenplay, and praised the music composed by Hitesh. Another reviewer said that J. Tamil had botched up the direction and cinematography.

=== Box office ===
The film took a below-average opening at the Chennai box office. The film who had a low-key release fared poorly at the box-office and the film producer Anil Dev(Anil.D) went to produce Aarvam (2010) under a new banner.
