= Freakens =

- Directed by: Anish J. Karrinad
- Screenplay by: Anish J. Karrinad
- Produced by: Edakunnil Sunil
- Starring: Anandhu Mukundan; Biju Sopanam; Indrans; Zulfiya Majeed
- Cinematography: R.V. Saran
- Edited by: Hashim
- Music by: Saanand George
- Production company: Best Films
- Distributed by: Highmast Cinemas
- Release date: 13 December 2019; (India)
- Running time: 2h 4min
- Language: Malayalam

Freakens is a 2019 Indian Malayalam-language comedy film written and directed by Anish J. Karrinad. Film produced by Edakunnil Sunil under the banner of Best Films. The film features Anandhu Mukundan, Biju Sopanam, Indrans and Kalabhavan Navas in lead roles.

== Cast ==
- Anandhu Mukundan
- Zulfiya Majeed
- Biju Sopanam
- Indrans as Dr. Abdullakoya
- Kalabhavan Niyas
- Kochu Preman
- Kulappulli Leela
- Nelson Sooranad
- Abhijith Krishna

== Music ==
The film score is composed by Saanand George after Jayaram's Thinkal Muthal Velli Vare, lyrics for which are written by O. S. A. Rasheed and Anish J. Karrinad.

== Release ==
Freakens was released in India on 13 December 2019.
