= Pattanathil Sundaran =

- Directed by: Vipin Mohan
- Written by: M. Sindhuraj
- Produced by: P. V. Basheer; S. Vijayan
- Starring: Dileep; Navya Nair; Cochin Haneefa; Jagathy Sreekumar
- Cinematography: Shaji Kumar
- Edited by: Ranjan Abraham
- Music by: Mohan Sithara
- Production company: Liberty Thara
- Distributed by: Liberty Thara
- Release date: 25 December 2003
- Country: India
- Language: Malayalam

Pattanathil Sundaran (transl. Sundaran in the City) is a 2003 Indian Malayalam-language domestic drama film directed by Vipin Mohan (in his directorial debut) and written by M. Sindhuraj, starring Dileep and Navya Nair. The music was composed by Mohan Sithara.

== Plot ==
The story follows Kizhakkethil Sundaresan, a misogynistic, lazy ration shop owner, who never attended college. He is married to Radhamani, an M.Sc. graduate. When Radhamani gets a job at the Secretariat in Thiruvananthapuram, she is excited and will need to move far from home. However, Sundaresan cannot leave his store and go with her, nor does he want Radhamani to go alone. In the argument that follows, Radhamani decides that she will go at any cost, and Sundaresan decides to go with her.

They both rent a home in Thiruvananthapuram. Sundaresan does all sorts of foul plays to get her fired from her job so that they can go home. Finally, he steals a confidential file that Radhamani was responsible for. He does this with the help of a clerk at her office, who also owns the house the couple is renting. Radhamani is humiliated at the office and attempts suicide. She is hospitalized, and Sundaresan confesses the truth to her boss. Radhamani decides to break up the relationship.

Later, Sundaresan learns that Radhamani is pregnant. However, all his attempts to heal the breakup and to see her fail. Sundaresan decides that he will join the evening college and take graduation. He works hard in his studies, earns his degree, and also takes a job as a bus conductor in KSRTC. Radhamani gives birth during that time, decides to forgive her husband, and the couple reunites.

== Cast ==
- Dileep as Kizhakkethil Sundaresan
- Navya Nair as Radhamani Sundaresan
- Cochin Haneefa as P.K. Shekhara Pillai
- Anila Sreekumar as Nancy, Radhamani's colleague
- Baiju as Venugopal, Radhamani's colleague
- Kaviyoor Ponnamma as Bhavaniamma, Sasidharan and Sundaresan's mother
- Yamuna as Shekhara Pillai's wife
- Salim Kumar as Adv. Bhuvanachandran
- Sadiq as Mathews, Radhamani's boss
- Suresh Krishna as Kizhakkethil Sasidharan, Sundaresan's elder brother
- Sona Nair as Shalini, Sasidharan's wife
- Jagathy Sreekumar as Kattuvalli Krishnan, Radhamani's father
- Bindu Panicker as Rukmini, Radhamani's Mother
- Augustine as Varghese
- Mamukkoya as Kanaran
- Jagannathan as Gopalakrishnan Nair
- Poojappura Radhakrishnan as Aboobacker
- Prajod Kalabhavan as Zachariah, Tutor of evening college
- Hakim Rawther as Anil, Sundaresan's friend
- Geetha Salam as Babu, Labourer
- Nandu Poduval as Thomas, Lodge receptionist
- Alencier Ley Lopez as Uncredited role
- Mahalakshmi
- Zeira Mathews as baby in a song

== Soundtrack ==
All the songs were composed by Mohan Sithara and the lyrics were written by B. R. Prasad, Sathyan Anthikad and Kaithapram Damodaran Namboothiri.

- Mullappoovin Motte - Afsal, Rajesh Vijay
- Kannanayal Duet - K. J. Yesudas, Rimi Tomy
- Kannanayal Male - K. J. Yesudas
- Deva Deva - Sunil
- Baala Baala Gopala - M.G. Sreekumar
- Endhinanu Female - Asha G Menon
- Endhinanu Male - Vidhu Prathap
- Thakkudukkutta - M.G. Sreekumar
