= Ineya =

Indian actress

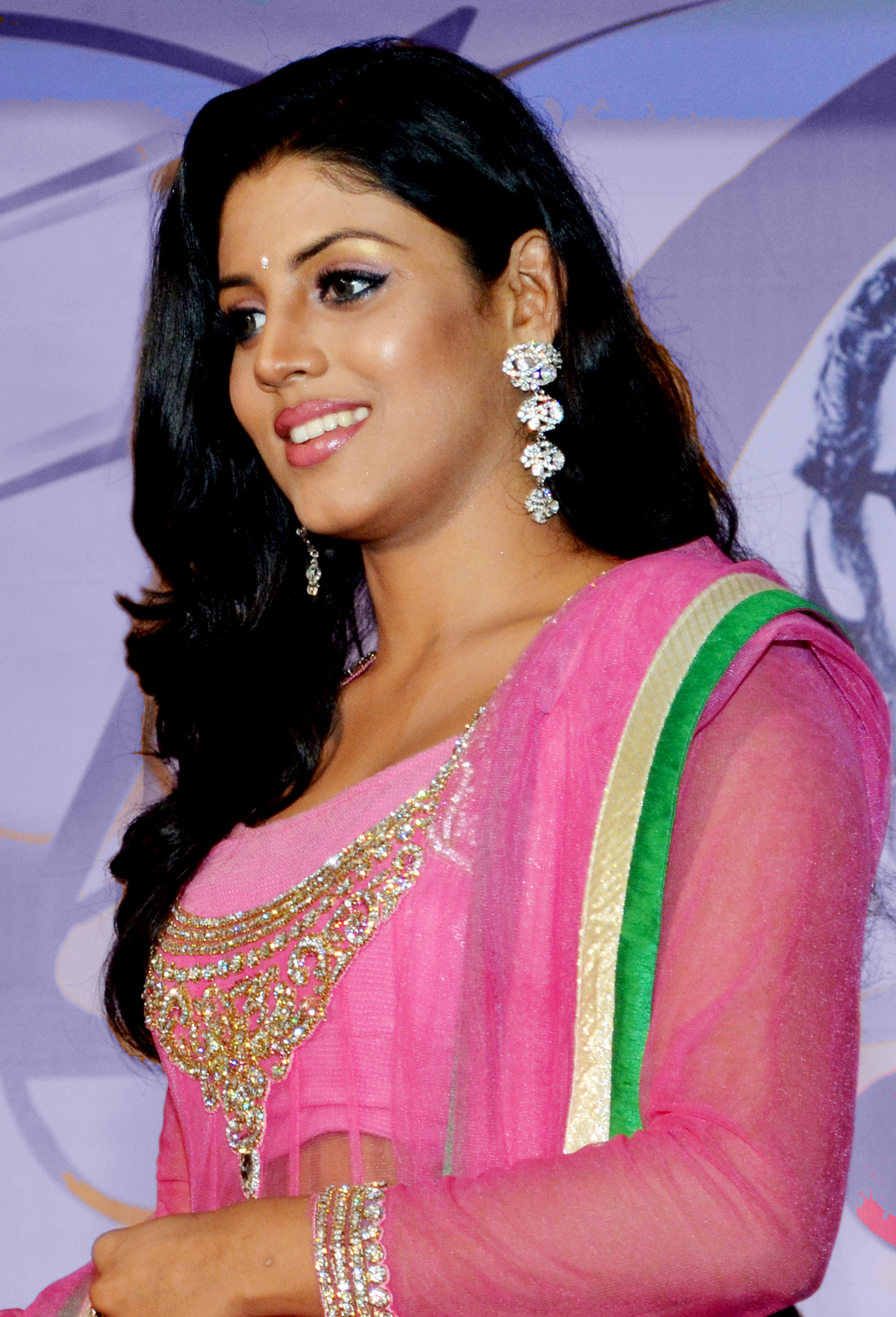
- Born: Shruti Sawant; Thiruvananthapuram, Kerala, India
- Occupation: Actress
- Years active: 2005–present
- Relatives: Swathi Thara (sister)

Shruti Sawant, known by her stage name Ineya, is an Indian actress who predominantly appears in Malayalam and Tamil films.

She won the Edison Award for Best Debut Actress and Tamil Nadu State Film Award for Best Actress for her role in the Tamil film Vaagai Sooda Vaa (2011) as well as Kerala Film Award for Best Supporting Actress in the Malayalam for Parole (2018) and Pengalila (2019).

== Career ==
Ineya acted in several Malayalam television series, short films and telefilms as a child artist. While studying in class four, she acted in the telefilm Koottilekku, which was followed by appearances in tele-serials Orma and Sree Guruvayoorappan by Vayalar Madhavan Kutty. Ineya won the Miss Trivandrum title in 2005, following which she did modeling and appeared in several television advertisements as well as a number of Malayalam award-winning art films, including Saira (2006), directed Dr. Biju, Dalamarmarangal (2009) and Umma (2011), both directed by Vijayakrishnan. She also played a pivotal role in Rajesh Touchriver's short feature The Sacred Face, which focusses on child abuse.

In 2010, she starred in a Tamil film Padagasalai and signed up four more Tamil films, all of which were cancelled or remain unreleased. She next played a supporting role as the sister to Cheran's character in Mysskin's mystery thriller Yuddham Sei. She acted in the female lead character in his period piece Vaagai Sooda Vaa (2011). Her portrayal of a tea stall owner was lauded by critics. Pavithra Srinivasan of Rediff wrote that she was a "welcome find", describing her as "natural, appealing, and very expressive". She acted in the film Mouna Guru (2011) co-starring Arulnidhi.

She was part of a number of offbeat films in Malayalam like Ayaal, Bhoopadathil Illatha Oridam and Radio. In 2014, she was first seen as herself in Vikraman's Ninaithathu Yaaro then in Pulivaal, the Tamil remake of the Malayalam film Chaappa Kurishu and Naan Sigappu Manithan. In her only Malayalam release of 2014, Madhu Kaithapram's Vellivelichathil (In the Limelight), she played the role of a dancer. She is seen in a dance number in the comedy entertainer Amar Akbar Anthony (2015). She also part of the bilingual titled Alone (2015) and Girls (2016).

Ineya portrayed a character named Lovely in Swarnakaduva (2016), directed by Jose Thomas. The actress was much praised for her powerful performance in the movie. She working with actor Mammootty in Puthan Panam (2017).

Iniya's performance in the movies Parole (2018) and Pengalila (2019) won her the second Best Supporting Actress award at the Kerala Film Critics Association Awards. She playing the title role in Tamil film Pottu (2019), a horror-comedy. Ineya was seen in the Malayalam film Mamangam (2019), and she shared screen space with Megastar Mammootty in the film. Her performance in the film was well appreciated.

Ineya starred alongside Kannada superstar Shiva Rajkumar titled Drona (2020). She then appear in The Tamil TV soap Kannana Kanne. She has played the lead in the thriller Coffee (2021) directly on TV. Later Ineya, who plays Vimal's wife in the crime web series Vilangu (2022) started streaming on ZEE5. She working with Samuthirakani in the crime thriller Naan Kadavul Illai (2023) directed by S. A. Chandrasekhar.

== Filmography ==
=== Films ===
Year	Title	Role	Language	Notes
2005	Saira	Aleena	Malayalam	
2005	Thanmathra	Student	Malayalam	Uncredited
2008	Thrill	Hema	Malayalam	Credited as Nirmisha
2009	Dalamarmarangal	Aswathy	Malayalam	Credited as Nirmisha
2010	Padagasalai	Abhirami	Tamil	
2011	Yuddham Sei	Charu	Tamil	
2011	Umma		Malayalam	
2011	Vaagai Sooda Vaa	Madhi	Tamil	Edison Award for Best Debut Actress; Tamil Nadu State Film Award for Best Actress; Nominated, Vijay Award for Best Debut Actress; Nominated, Filmfare Award for Best Actress – Tamil
2011	Mouna Guru	Aarthi	Tamil	
2012	Bhoopadathil Illatha Oridam	Bhaama	Malayalam	
2012	Ammavin Kaipesi	Selvi	Tamil	
2013	Omega.exe	Aleena Antony	Malayalam	
2013	Radio	Shwetha	Malayalam	
2013	Kan Pesum Vaarthaigal	Janani	Tamil	
2013	Chennaiyil Oru Naal	Swetha	Tamil	
2013	Maasani	Masani	Tamil	
2013	Ayaal	Chakkara	Malayalam	
2013	Nugam	Kathir's girl friend	Tamil	
2014	Ninaithathu Yaaro	Herself	Tamil	Special appearance
2014	Pulivaal	Pavithra	Tamil	
2014	Naan Sigappu Manithan	Kavitha	Tamil	
2014	Kathai Thiraikathai Vasanam Iyakkam	Herself	Tamil	Special appearance
2014	Vellivelichathil	Tanuja	Malayalam	
2014	Oru Oorla Rendu Raja	Street dancer	Tamil	Special appearance
2015	Rosapookalam	Rose	Malayalam	
2015	Amar Akbar Anthony	Bar dancer	Malayalam	Special appearance
2015	Alone	Ramya	Kannada	Multilingual
2016	Karai Oram	Ramya	Tamil	Multilingual
2016	Leela	Ramya	Telugu	Multilingual
2016	Girls	Sophia	Malayalam	Bilingual film
2016	Thiraikku Varaadha Kadhai	Sophia	Tamil	Bilingual film
2016	Swarnakaduva	Lovely	Malayalam	
2017	Koditta Idangalai Nirappuga	Dancer	Tamil	Cameo appearance in a song
2017	Vaigai Express	Swapnapriya	Tamil	
2017	Puthan Panam	Sundari	Malayalam	
2017	Sathura Adi 3500	Sophie	Tamil	
2017	Aakashamittayee	Radhika	Malayalam	
2018	Parole	Annie	Malayalam	Kerala Film Critics Association Award for Second Best Actress
2019	Pengalila	Rekha	Malayalam	Kerala Film Critics Association Award for Second Best Actress
2019	Pottu	Pottu	Tamil	
2019	Thakkol	Sarah	Malayalam	
2019	Mamangam	Unnineeli	Malayalam	Ramu Karyat award - Special Jury
2020	Drona	Guru's wife	Kannada	
2021	Writer	Saranya	Tamil	
2022	Aadhaar	Saroja	Tamil	
2022	Coffee	Sathya	Tamil	
2023	Naan Kadavul Illai	Maisu	Tamil	
2024	DNA	Naila Vincent	Malayalam	
2024	Gangs of Sukumara Kurup		Malayalam	
2024	Seeran	Poongothai	Tamil	
2024	The Smile Man	Chithra	Tamil	
2026	Sweety Naughty Crazy	Nandini Miss	Tamil	
2026	Mookuthi Amman 2	Sumathi	Tamil	

=== Television ===
Serials

Year	Title	Role	Channel	Language
2005	Orma	Dancer in title song	Asianet	Malayalam
2007	Jalam	Dancer in title song	Surya TV	Malayalam
2007	Sree Guruvayurappan	Young Poothana (Special appearance)	Surya TV	Malayalam
2020; 2021; 2023	Kannana Kanne	Kousalya and Chief Doctor (Extended Dual Special Appearances)	Sun TV	Tamil
2022	Kanalpoovu	Ashwathy Mahadevan (Special appearance)	Surya TV	Malayalam
2026	Annam	herself (Special appearance)	Sun TV	Tamil

Shows

Year	Title	Role	Channel	Language
2012	Super Kudumbam	Celebrity judge	Sun TV	Tamil
2012	Comedy Stars	Dancer	Asianet	Malayalam
2013	Munch Stars	Herself	Asianet	Malayalam
2014	Let's Dance: Season 2	Judge	Amrita TV	Malayalam
2015	Smart Show	Participant	Flowers	Malayalam
2015	Genes	Participant	Zee Tamil	Tamil
2019	Kerala Dance League	Judge	Amrita TV	Malayalam
2019	Comedy Stars	Celebrity judge	Asianet	Malayalam
2019	Surya Jodi No.1	Judge	Surya TV	Malayalam
2021	Star Singer	Performer for Shankaram fusion	Asianet	Malayalam
2021	Star Magic	Mentor	Flowers	Malayalam
2021	Dance Vs Dance 2	Mentor	Colors Tamil	Tamil
2023	Red Carpet	Mentor	Amrita TV	Malayalam
2024	Naanga Ready Neenga Readya	Celebrity judge	Sun TV	Tamil

Other Works

Year	Title	Role	Channel	Language	Notes
	Koottilekku	Actress (Child Artist)		Malayalam	Telefilm
2022	Vilangu	Revathi	ZEE5	Tamil	Web-Series
2024	Sshhh	Meera	aha	Tamil	Web-Series

== Awards ==
Edison Awards

- 2011: Best Debut Actress – Vaagai Sooda Vaa

Tamil Nadu State Film Awards

- 2011: Best Actress – Vaagai Sooda Vaa

Kerala Film Critics Association Awards

- 2018: Second Best Actress – Pengalila, Parole
