= Dum (2016 film) =

- Theatrical release poster
- Directed by: Anuram
- Written by: Anuram
- Produced by: Jude Agnel Sudhir
- Starring: Shine Tom Chacko; Lal; Shritha Sivadas; Parvathi T Juby Ninan; Sreejith Ravi; Kochu Preman
- Cinematography: Sunil Prem
- Edited by: Vijay Shankar
- Music by: Jassie Gift
- Release date: 26 August 2016
- Country: India
- Language: Malayalam

Dum is a 2016 Indian Malayalam-language film, written and directed by Anuram. The film stars Shine Tom Chacko, Lal, Joju George, Shritha Sivadas, Parvathi T, and Sreejith Ravi. Thiruvananthapuram and Kochi were the major locations of the film. The film released on 26 August 2016.

== Summary ==
Dum is story of goon named Xavier and his henchman Antony and the struggle they face to achieve their goals.

== Cast ==
- Shine Tom Chacko as Antony
- Lal as Xavier
- Shritha Sivadas as Sherin Xavier
- Parvathi T as Annamma
- Juby Ninan as Duttan
- Minon as Tommy
- Sreejith Ravi as I.G Padma Raj
- Joju George as D.C.P Manoj Namboothiri
- Kochu Preman as Raghavan
- Padmaraj Ratheesh as S.I Kishor
- Sudhi Koppa as Chengalchoola Rangan
- Bineesh Bastin as Njandu
- Sasi Kalinga as Chandran
- Kulappulli Leela
- Nelson Sooranad as Freek Ravi

== Music ==
The film's songs and background music has been composed by Jassie Gift for the lyrics of Vayalar Sarath Chandra Varma, while the singers are Vineeth Sreenivasan, Lal, Nelson Shooranadu, and Jassie Gift himself.

== Reception ==
Kevin Kishore of Deccan Chronicle rated 2 out of 5 stars. He criticised the script but gave positive nod to Lal's acting.
