= Maala Parvathi =

Indian actress

- Born: Parvathi Thrivikraman; 8 May 1968 (age 58); Thiruvananthapuram, Kerala, India
- Education: University of Kerala, Kerala Law Academy Law College
- Occupations: Actress; anchor; psychologist; advocate
- Years active: 1994–present
- Spouse: Satheesan Balan (m. 1991)
- Children: 1
- Parent(s): C. V. Thrivikraman; K. Lalitha

Parvathi Thrivikraman, professionally known as Maala Parvathi, is an Indian actress, who predominantly works in Malayalam cinema besides also appearing in Tamil, Telugu, and Hindi films. She has also won several awards and recognitions for her work in cinema and theatre. Besides her acting career she is also a psychologist, advocate, television presenter and social worker.

== Early life ==
Parvathi was born in Thiruvananthapuram, Kerala, to Adv. C. V. Thrivikraman and Dr. K. Lalitha. After her schooling at the Carmel School, she did her pre-degree at All Saints College in Thiruvananthapuram and was the university union councillor.

Thereafter, she pursued her bachelor's degree in Psychology from the Government College for Women, Thiruvananthapuram. During this time, she became the union chairperson of the college and was also the campus coordinator for SPIC MACAY. She then did her master's and M.Phil. in psychology from the University of Kerala and LL.B. from Kerala Law Academy Law College, Thiruvananthapuram.

== Career ==
Parvathi began her career as a television presenter from 1994 for popular TV shows of Asianet's Ulkazhcha, Nammal Thammil and its first live morning show Suprabhatham, that ran from 1997 to 2000. Parvathi ventured into acting in 2007 with the film Time, directed by Shaji Kailas. Since then, she has worked in more than 100 films across various languages. Her performances has gauged her several accolades including the prestigious Ramu Kariat Award, JFW Award etc. to name a few. Besides Cinema, she works in theatre and has worked in international productions including The Lady from the Sea which featured in World Theatre Festival 2012, OZ Festival, Bharat Rang Mahotsav, Ibsen Festival.

== Theatre ==
Theatrical performances include:

- The Lady from the Sea (Sagarakanyaka) – 2009 – Directed by M. G. Jyothish
- Bhagavathajjugam – 2011 – Directed by M. G. Jyothish
- Lesson – 2011 – Directed by M. G. Jyothish
- Irakalodu Mathramalla Samsarikendathu – 2013 – Directed by M. G. Jyothish & D. Raghuthaman
- Various festivals, including World Theatre Festival 2012, OZ festival, Bhart Rang Mahothsav, Ibsen Festival

== Personal life ==
Parvathi is married to Satheesan Balan on 9 December 1991, who works with C-DIT, Government of Kerala. They have a son Ananthakrishnan.

== Filmography ==
Key
†	Denotes films that have not yet been released

=== As actress ===
==== Malayalam films ====
List of Parvathi T. Malayalam film acting credits
Year	Title	Role	Notes
1987	Oru Maymasa Pulariyil	Shakeela	
2007	Time	Mary Thomas	
2008	Thalappavu	Interviewer	
2009	Neelathamara	Older Kunjimalu	
2009	Paleri Manikyam	Mary Kurien	
2010	Apoorvaragam	Reetha	
2010	Pramani	Annie Teacher	
2011	The Train	Meera's mother	
2011	Bangkok Summer	Doctor	
2011	Orma Mathram	Doctor	
2011	Namukku Parkkan	Nirmala	
2012	Ayalum Njanum Thammil	D.M.O	
2012	Bavuttiyude Namathil	Ramala Thatha	
2012	Kalikaalam	Dr. Shoshamma Kuriyan	
2013	Kanyaka Talkies	Maria	
2013	Vedivazhipadu	Padma	
2013	Natholi Oru Cheriya Meenalla	Preman's mother	
2013	Buddy	Interviewer	
2013	Immanuel	Client	
2014	Njan	Veluthedath Meenakshi	
2014	Munnariyippu	Mamma	
2014	Om Shanthi Oshaana	Principal, Rosamma PV	
2014	Namboothiri Yuvav @ 43	Sree Devi	
2014	Konthayum Poonoolum	Lekha	
2014	Pranayakatha	Vanaja	
2014	100 Degree Celsius	Adv. Rani Varma	
2014	Beware of Dogs	Radhika	
2014	Lal Bahadur Shastri	Sree Lal's Mother	
2014	Tamaar Padaar	Activist Sandhya Sumesh	
2015	Oru Vadakkan Selfie	Daisy's Mother	
2015	Kaattum Mazhayum	Razia	
2015	Loham	Flight passenger	
2015	Salt Mango Tree	School Principal	
2015	Upakadha		
2016	Pavada	Mother Superior	
2016	Action Hero Biju	Molly	
2016	Leela	Padmini	
2016	Mohavalayam	Elizabeth	
2016	Mazhaneerthullikal	Mother	
2016	Karinkunnam 6's	Doctor	
2016	Pinneyum	Interviewer	
2016	Dum	Annamma	
2016	Vaakku	Umma	
2016	Girls	Teacher	
2016	Kuppivala	Rosamma	
2016	Paathi	Kalyani	
2016	8119 Miles	Mamma	
2016	Swapnarajyam	Bindu	
2017	Thrissivaperoor Kliptham	Mini chechi	
2017	Take Off	Shaheed's mother	
2017	Comrade in America	Mary	
2017	Godha	Anjaneya's mother	
2017	Prakasan	Madam	
2018	Kala Viplavam Pranayam	Jayan's mother	
2018	Kalyanam	Suma	
2018	Purple	Megha's mother	
2018	Kinar	Liya Rajeev	
2018	Koode	Lily	
2018	Varathan	Priya's mother	
2018	Oru Kuprasidha Payyan	Sreekumariyamma	
2018	Vallikudilile Vellakkaran	Aswathi's mother	
2018	Pretham 2	Deepa Mathew	
2019	Oru Caribbean Udayippu	Rajalakshmi	
2019	Janaadhipan	Kshema	
2019	Irupathiyonnaam Noottaandu	Mother superior	
2019	An International Local Story	Nirmala	
2019	Vaarikkuzhiyile Kolapathakam	Vincent's mother	
2019	Soothrakkaran	Sreekuttan's mother	
2019	Lucifer	Doctor	
2019	Ishq	Radhamma	
2019	And The Oscar Goes To...	Khadeeja	
2019	Pathinettam Padi	Susan Abraham Palakkal	
2019	Sachin	Devika	
2019	Ormayil Oru Sisiram	Ramani	
2019	Mohabbathin Kunjabdulla	Umma/Alima	
2019	Porinju Mariam Jose	Susanna	
2019	Brother's Day	Basheer's wife	
2019	Thelivu	Omana	
2019	Android Kunjappan Version 5.25	Sawdamini	
2019	Lessons	Kannan Nair's wife	
2019	Kettyolaanu Ente Malakha	Dr.Rosamma	
2019	Happy Sardar	Reeta	
2019	Puzhikkadakan	Thresyamma	
2019	Mamangam	Chirudevi & Chanthu Panikkar's mother	
2020	Varky	Dr. Ponnamma	
2020	Paapam Cheyyathavar Kalleriyatte	Grace Amma	
2020	Kilometers and Kilometers	Beena	
2020	C U Soon	Kevin's Amma	
2021	Anugraheethan Antony	Thankamani	
2021	Cheraathukal	Mother Superior	
2021	Cold Case	Padmaja	
2021	Malik	Philomena	
2021	Marakkar: Lion of the Arabian Sea	Samoothiri's Sister	
2021	Kshanam		
2022	Randu	Sainabha	
2022	Bheeshma Parvam	Molly	
2022	Salute	A R Vijayalakshmi	
2022	Kallan D'Souza	Asha's mother	Photo & voice only
2022	Padma	Dr. Merlin	
2022	Paappan	Dr. Radhika Menon	
2022	Ini Utharam	Gayathri Vasudev	
2022	The Teacher	Dr. Varsha	
2022	Shubhadinam		
2022	Gold	Other bride mother	
2022	Kakkipada	Revathi	
2022	Adrishyam	Purushothaman's wife	Photo only
2023	Kallanum Bhagavathiyum	Lakshmi	
2023	Vellari Pattanam	Minister	
2023	Purusha Pretham	Govt. Pleader	
2023	Thaaram Theertha Koodaram	Lakshmi	
2023	RDX: Robert Dony Xavier	Kunjumol	
2023	Sesham Mike-il Fathima	Catherine	
2024	Palayam PC		
2024	Abraham Ozler	Dr. Annapoorneswari	
2024	Vivekanandan Viralanu	Savithri Teacher	
2024	Secret Home		
2024	Nadikar	Herself	
2024	Little Hearts	Anita	
2025	The Pet Detective	Seema Jose Alula	
2025	Mindiyum Paranjum	Sanal's mother	
2026	Shukran	Prasanna teacher	

==== Tamil films ====
List of Parvathi T. Tamil film acting credits
Year	Title	Role	Notes
2015	Idhu Enna Maayam	Maya's mother	
2016	Thiraikku Varadha Kathai	Teacher	Bilingual film
2018	Nimir	Shenbaghavalli's mother	
2018	Keni	Liya Rajeev	Bilingual film
2019	Game Over	Dr. Reena	Bilingual film
2021	Maara	Paaru's mother	
2022	FIR	Praveena Begum	
2022	Connect	Healthcare worker	
2023	Annapoorani: The Goddess of Food	Farhaan's mother	
2025	Aaryan	Asha George	
2025	Veera Dheera Sooran	Ravi's wife	
2025	Others	Mother	
2026	Thalaivar Thambi Thalaimaiyil	Jeevarathnam's mother	

==== Other language films ====
List of Parvathi T. film credits in other languages
Year	Title	Role	Language	Notes
2019	Game Over	Dr. Reena	Telugu	Bilingual film
2021	Tuck Jagadish	Arjunamma	Telugu	
2022	Ammu	Kalpana	Telugu	
2022	Salaam Venky	Clara	Hindi	Debut in Hindi

=== As a voice actor ===
List of Parvathi T. film voice acting credits
Year	Title	Role
2006	Pakal	Dubbed for Swetha Menon
2006	Notebook	Dubbed for Jaya Murali
2008	Thirakadha	Dubbed for Praveena
2009	I. G. – Inspector General	Dubbed for Reshmi Boban
2022	K.G.F: Chapter 2 (Malayalam version)	Dubbed for Malavika Avinash
2022	Sita Ramam (Malayalam version)	Dubbed for Rohini

=== Short films ===
List of Parvathi T. short film credits
Year	Title	Role
2016	Grace Villa	Sally Grace
2016	Cologne	Sheela
2018	Rekha	Rekha
2018	Kuttichan	Sr. Annie
2018	Amma	Amma
2018	Yamunayude Nimishangal	Yamuna
2018	Onnurungi Enittathu Pole	Umma
2019	Njan?	Raji
2020	Fresh Juice	Umma
2020	Make Over	Voice only
2023	Qabar	Umma
2023	Orikkal Koodi	Thressia

=== Web series ===
List of Parvathi T. web series credits
Year	Series	Role	Channel
2019	Menaka	Rosie	ManoramaMAX
2023	Priyapettavan Piyush	Nirmala	Karikku
2023	Masterpeace	Aniamma	Disney+ Hotstar
2024	Poacher	Roshni	Prime Video
2024	Porul	Mary	Karikku

== Television ==
=== As host ===
- Ulkazhcha – Asianet – 50 episodes – 1994
- Suprabhatham ( First ever Morning Show) – Asianet – 1997 – 2000 – With Rajashree Warrier, Beeyar Prasad & Sanal Pottie
- Shubhadhinam (Morning Show) – Kairali TV– 2000–2003 – with Anoop Menon and Anantha Padmanabhan
- Ponpulari (Morning Show) – Surya TV– 2004 – 2005
- Startalk (Celebrity chat)– Surya TV – 2005 – 2007
- Nishagandhi DD Malayalam
- Koottukkari DD Malayalam
- Special shows and interviews with celebrities and stars for Doordarshan, Indiavision, Asianet plus, Jai Hind, ACV.

=== As panelist/judge ===
- Veruthe Alla Bharya – Season I & III – Mazhavil Manorama
- Midukki – Season I – Mazhavil Manorama
- Made for each other – Season I – Mazhavil Manorama
- Comedy Stars – Asianet

=== Series ===
- Sundari (Malayalam TV series) ( Surya TV)
- Aanpirannol (Amrita TV)
- Ishtam (Surya TV)
- Sooryakaladi Mana (Amrita TV)
- Aniyathi (Mazhavil Manorama)
- Daivathinu Swantham Devootty (Mazhavil Manorama)
