= Kochu Preman =

Indian actor (1955–2022)

- Born: K. S. Premkumar; 1 June 1955; Valiyavila, Thiruvananthapuram, Travancore–Cochin, India
- Died: 3 December 2022 (aged 67); Thiruvananthapuram, Kerala, India
- Education: University of Kerala
- Occupation: Actor
- Spouse: Girija Preman (m. 1984)
- Children: 1

Kalaramathil Shivaraman Premkumar (1 June 1955 – 3 December 2022), better known by his stage name Kochu Preman, was an Indian actor who worked in Malayalam film industry. He acted in more than 250 films, mainly in supporting and comedy roles, and also appeared in television.

== Early life and career ==
Kochu Preman was born K. S. Premkumar on 1 June 1955 to Kalaramathil Shivaraman Shasthri and T. S. Kamalam at Peyad in Thiruvananthapuram, India. He has six siblings. Preman had his primary education from Government school, Peyad. He completed college education from Mahatma Gandhi College, Thiruvananthapuram. He has worked in drama troupes such as Kalidasa Kalakendram, Kerala Theaters, and Sanghachethana. In 1996, he debuted in the Malayalam film Dilliwala Rajakumaran. He adapted the stage name Kochu Preman because he believed that the name suits his short stature.

== Personal life and death ==
Preman married cine-serial actress Girija Preman in 1984. They had a son named P. G. Harikrishnan.

Preman died on 3 December 2022, at the age of 67 in Thiruvananthapuram. He was suffering from lung related issues prior to his death.

== Filmography ==
Year	Title	Role	Notes
1979	Ezhunirangal		Debut Film
1996	Dilliwala Rajakumaran	Balan's father	
1997	Kathanayakan	Vamanan Nampoothiri	
1997	Rajathanthram		
1997	Guru		
1997	The Car	Valiyakulam Swamy	
1997	Irattakuttikalude Achan	Valsalan	
1998	Vismayam	Kurupp	
1998	Mattupetti Machan	Shankarankutty	Cameo Appearance
1998	Sreekrishnapurathe Nakshathrathilakkam	Indhumathi's father	
1998	Illamura Thampuran		
1998	Ayushmanbava		
1998	Panjaloham	Vasu	
1999	Pattabhishekam		
1999	Njangal Santhushtaranu	The Policeman	
1999	Indulekha		
2000	Thenkasipattanam	Rengarajan	
2000	Vinayapoorvam Vidhyaadharan	Captain	
2000	Indriyam		
2000	Kaathara		
2000	Neelathadakathile Nizhalpakshikal		
2001	Uthaman	Padmanabhan Pillai	
2001	Achaneyanenikkishtam	Kurupu Mash	
2001	Nariman	M. L. A.'s husband	
2001	Naranathu Thampuran	Peethambharan	
2001	Ee Nadu Innale Vare	Divakaran	
2001	Sravu		
2001	Korappan The Great	Police Constable Kuttan Pilla	
2001	Pranayakalathu		
2001	Chethaaram		
2002	Kalyanaraman	U. P. P. Menon	
2002	India Gate		
2003	Thilakkam	Swaminathan, the oracle	
2003	Pulival Kalyanam	Santhosh Menon, Bank Manager	
2003	Arimpara		
2003	Varum Varunnu Vannu	Jayan	
2003	Swantham Malavika	Thampi	
2004	Chathikkatha Chanthu	Balan, the palace sectary	
2004	Sathyam	Arjunan, the policeman	
2004	Kaakkakarumban	Raghavan	
2004	Kusurti	The Circus Manager	
2004	Kottaram Vaidhyan	Chetti	
2004	Maaratha Naadu		
2005	Udayon	Kangaroo, bus conductor	
2005	Thommanum Makkalum	Doctor Satheeshan	
2005	Immini Nalloraal	The Barber	
2005	Iruvattam Manavaatti	Pankajakshan	
2005	Kalyana Kurimanam		
2005	The Campus	"Vodka" Pathrose	
2005	Banglawil Oudha	Varkkichan	
2005	OK Chacko Cochin Mumbai	Thommi	
2005	Vacation	Mooppan	
2005	Twinkle Twinkle Little Star		
2006	Chakkaramuthu	Ramendran, Lottery Agent	
2006	Kanaka Simhasanam	Chinnakeshav Reddy	
2006	Pathaaka	Aravindan	
2006	Mouryan		
2006	Anuvaadamillaathe		
2007	Changathipoocha	Purushothaman Nair	
2007	Chotta Mumbai	Premachandran	
2007	Inspector Garud	Shivan Pillai	
2007	Nivedyam	Nakulan	
2007	Ayur Rekha		
2008	Crazy Gopalan	Diwakaran	
2008	College Kumaran	Sudhakarn	
2008	Mizhikal Sakshi	Vasudeva Valyathaan	
2008	Kabadi Kabadi	Sasidharan Nair	
2008	Twenty:20		Uncredited role
2008	De Ingottu Nokkiye		
2008	Apoorva	The Principal	
2008	Kovalam	Mathan	
2008	Robo	Vaidyar	
2009	Passenger	Jaffer	
2009	2 Harihar Nagar	Chandykunju	
2009	Aayirathil Oruvan	Kunjukuttan	
2009	Dalamarmarangal	Bhaskaran	
2009	Swantham Lekhakan	Minister	
2009	My Big Father	Preman	
2009	Colours	Keshananda Swamikal	
2009	Samastha Keralam PO	Velichappadu	
2009	Kappal Muthalaali	Kuruvila	
2009	Oru Black and White Kudumbam	Cheriyachan	
2009	Patham Adhyayam	Bharathan Ashari	
2009	Sanmanasullavan Appukuttan	Unnithan	
2009	Bharya Swantham Suhurthu	Kochunarayanan	
2010	In Ghost House Inn	Chandykunju	
2010	Marykkundoru Kunjaadu	Charlie	
2010	Paappi Appacha	Keshavan	
2010	Shikkar	Chacko	
2010	Kaaryasthan	Ayyappan Nair	
2010	Advocate Lakshmanan – Ladies Only	Bhakhtavalsalan	
2010	Tournament	Cleetus	
2010	Nallavan	Santhosh	
2010	Oru Small Family	Napoleon	
2010	Cheriya Kallanum Valiya Policeum	Kuttappan	
2010	Kadaksham	Sugunan Mundakayam	
2010	Karayilekku Oru Kadal Dooram	A man near the temple	
2010	Raama Raavanan	Rajappan	
2010	Plus Two	The School Security	
2010	Pulliman		
2010	Chaverpada		
2010	3 Char Sau Bees		
2010	Senior Mandrake		
2010	Thaskara Lahala		
2010	Kausthubham		
2010	Aathmakatha		
2010	Rhythm	Udhuppu	
2011	Teja Bhai & Family	Ravindran Nair	
2011	Beautiful	Kunjachan	
2011	Manikyakkallu	Varghese	
2011	Ninnishtam Ennishtam 2	Kochugovindan	
2011	Sarkar Colony	Secratriat Officer	
2011	Bombay March 12	Naryanan Kochettan	
2011	Maharaja Talkies	Kamalasanan	
2011	Killadi Raman	Abdul Gafoor	
2011	Ven Shankhu Pol		
2011	Sthalam		
2011	Happy Durbar	Gunalan	
2011	Ramayanam		
2011	Umma		
2012	Ordinary	Peethambaran	
2012	Poppins	Hari's senior officer	Cameo Appearance
2012	Mayamohini	Pappan Parapokkara	
2012	Bachelor Party	Dr. Moorthy	
2012	Thalsamayam Oru Penkutty	Ajayan	
2012	101 Weddings	Lawrence	
2012	Trivandrum Lodge	Sadanandan	
2012	Ardhanaari	The school teacher	
2012	Bhoopadathil Illatha Oridam	Aravindan	
2012	Vaadhyar	The District Education Officer	
2012	Mullamottum Munthiricharum	Plapparambil Kuriyachan	
2012	Madirasi	Nambheeshan	
2012	Josettante Hero	Sreedharan Parasala	
2012	Cinema Company		
2012	Ee Thirakkinidayil		
2012	Ozhimuri		
2012	Pulivaal Pattanam	Flat security	
2012	Ennennum Ormakkayi		
2013	Romans	Achankunju, the sexton	
2013	Tourist Home	The Money Lender	
2013	Sound Thoma	Kuttan Pilla	
2013	Zachariayude Garbhinikal	Hospital Attender	
2013	Up & Down: Mukalil Oralundu	Chandrappan the Lift Mechanic	
2013	Radio	Zahir Hussain	
2013	God for Sale	Soman Pilla	
2013	Vallatha Pahayan	The School Principal	
2013	Good Bad & Ugly		
2013	Mr. Bean	Colonel Lambo	
2013	For Sale	Mani	
2013	Maanikkathamburaattiyum Kristhumas Kaarolum		
2013	Thekku Thekkoru Deshathu		
2013	Bunty Chor		
2013	Njan Anaswaran		
2013	Malayalanaadu		
2014	Manja		
2014	Happy Journey	Flat Secretary	
2014	Munnariyippu	Advocate Eeppan	
2014	Money Ratnam	Gopi	
2014	Ulsaha Committee	Peethambara Kuruppu	
2014	Aamayum Muyalum	Sexton Ouseppu	
2014	Polytechnic	Sukumaran's aide	
2014	Maramkothi		
2014	Oru Korean Padam		Uncredited role
2014	Persiakaran		
2014	Color Baloon	Vishwambharan	
2014	Kalyanism	Vijayan	
2014	Ottamandaram	A drunkard	
2014	Call me@	Varghese	
2014	Garbhasreeman	Mammoottikka	
2014	My Dear Mummy	Bheeran	
2014	Life Full of Life		
2014	Mizhi Thurakku		
2014	Educational Loan		
2015	Roopantharam	Raghavan	Lead Role
2015	Chandrettan Evideya	Issac Eeppan	
2015	Kanal	Chandranandhan	
2015	Female Unnikrishnan	School Headmaster	
2015	Priyamanasam		Sanskrit movie
2015	Njan Samvidhanam Cheyyum		
2015	Smart Boys		
2015	Aval Vannathinu Sesham	Premachandran	
2015	Thaarakangale Saakshi	A Money Lender	
2015	Compartment	Sukathan	
2015	Ente Padam Ninte Katha		
2016	Welcome to Central Jail	Stephen	
2016	Action Hero Biju	Stephen	
2016	Leela	Dr. Sukumaran	
2016	Shajahanum Pareekuttiyum	Purushothaman	
2016	Oru Murai Vanthu Parthaya	Prakashan's uncle	
2016	Dum	Raghavan	
2016	Moonnaam Naal Njaayaraazhcha	Sudheer J Nair	
2016	Angane Thanne Nethave Anjettennam Pinnale	Vellichapaadu	
2016	Calling Bell	Kochettan	
2016	Ghost Villa	A Warlock	
2016	Popcorn		
2016	Paris Payyans		
2016	Kadha Parayum Muthachan		
2016	Taka Toka Tanka		
2016	Oravasaram		
2016	Aneesya		
2016	Bhramsam		
2016	Maayavanam Bunglow		
2016	Snehapoorvam		
2017	C/O Saira Banu	Legal Aid Advocate	
2017	Avarude Raavukal	Dr. Jayamurugan	
2017	Crossroad	Ulahannan	In the segment Badar
2017	Ayaal Sassi	Sathyaneshan	
2017	Karutha Joothan		
2017	Karutha Sooryan		
2017	Six Feet	Pastor Lasor	
2017	Gandhinagarile Unniyarcha	Kochettan	
2017	Kuppivala		
2017	Hello Dubaikkaran		
2017	Pakal Pole		
2017	Njaanaara Mon		
2017	Kaviyude Osyath		
2018	Varathan	Oanth	
2018	Chalakkudikkaran Changathi	The Cameraman	
2018	Kuttanadan Marpappa	Peter's Relative	
2018	Kuttanpillayude Sivarathri	Missionary Priest	
2018	Thattumpurath Achuthan	Kumarashanan	
2018	Carbon	Balan Pilla	
2018	Mangalyam Thanthunanena	Babu	
2018	Padayottam	Ponappan Sir	
2018	Daivame Kaithozham K. Kumar Akanam		
2018	Chandragiri	WhatsApp Maash	
2018	Swarmappathaayam		
2018	Samadhanathinte Vellaripraavukal		
2018	Theneechayum Peerangippadayum		
2018	Pranayatheertham		
2018	Ulkaazhcha		
2019	Brother's Day	Fr. Stephen Mathew	
2019	Allu Ramendran		
2019	Mohabbathin Kunjabdulla	The grocery shop owner	
2019	Ambili	Vasukkuttan	
2019	Ganagandharvan	Cheriyan	
2019	Shibu	Eastman Narayanan	
2019	Sachin		
2019	Oru Caribbean Udayippu		
2019	Freakens		
2019	Lessons		In the segment Choolam
2019	Vaarthakal Ithuvare		
2019	Hridyam	Sreedharan	
2019	British Bungalaw	Thankappan, Tea shop owner	
2019	Poovalliyum Kunjadum	Lasor	
2019	1948 - Kalam Paranjathu		
2019	Thelivu		
2020	Paapam Cheyyathavar Kalleriyatte	Mathachan	
2021	The Priest	School Peon	Cameo Appearance
2021	Keshu Ee Veedinte Nadhan	Ramendran's father	Cameo Appearance; Released in Disney+Hotstar
2021	Vrithaakrithiyilulla Chathuram	Rajappan Holiyappa	
2021	Oru Pappadavada Premam	Kunjappan	
2022	Karnan Napoleon Bhagath Singh		
2022	Aaraattu	Hari, the pachayath President	
2022	Kaduva	Ithakk	
2022	Last 6 Hours		Bilingual Film
2022	Kochaal		
2022	King Fish		
2022	Vellarikapattanam	Surendran	
2022	Ulkkanal		
2023	Thankam	Sasipillai	Posthumously Released
2023	Vasantha Mullai	Hotel Owner	Posthumously Released; Tamil film
2023	Pookkaalam	Churchyard keeper	Posthumously Released
2024	Makudi		Posthumously Released

== Television ==
- Cinemala (Asianet)
- Calling bell (Surya TV)
- Chakkarabharani (Surya TV)
- Chila kudumba chitrangal (Kairali TV)
- Culcutta hospital (Surya TV)
- Devimahathmyam (Asianet)
- Dream City (Surya TV)
- Jwalayayi (DD Malayalam)
- Kadamattathu Kathanar (Asianet)
- Kaliveedu (Surya TV)
- Kanthari
- Koodevide (Asianet)
- Kunnankulathangaadi (Media One)
- Laughing Villa (Surya TV)
- Life is beautiful (Asianet)
- Life is Beautiful Season 2 (Asianet)
- Moonumani (Flowers (TV channel))
- Mr & Mrs Comedy (YouTube)
- Mrs. Hitler (Zee Keralam)
- Ningalude Swantham Chanthu (DD Malayalam) Double Role
- Prekshakare Avashyamunde (Mazhavil Manorama)
- Rahasya Sancharangal (Asianet Plus)
- Shivakami (Surya TV)
- Sneham (Surya TV)
- Sreemahabhagavatham (Asianet)
- Swami Ayyappan (Asianet)
- Thatteem Mutteem (Mazhavil Manorama)
- Urulakku Upperi (Amrita TV)
