= Nizam Rawther =

Indian scriptwriter and filmmaker (1974–2024)

- Born: 30 September 1974; Alappuzha, Kerala, India
- Died: 6 March 2024 (aged 49)
- Occupation: Screenwriter
- Years active: 2011–2024

Nizam Rawther (30 September 1974 – 6 March 2024) was an Indian scriptwriter and documentary filmmaker who worked in Malayalam cinema. He is known for films including Zachariayude Garbhinikal, Bombay Mittayi, and Radio, and Zachariayude Garbhinikal (won four awards from the 44th Kerala State Film Awards including Best Story) and Oru Sarkar Ulpannam. Rawther worked in the Kerala health department. He died on 6 March 2024, at the age of 49.
