= Ezham Suryan =

- Poster
- Directed by: Njanasheelan
- Screenplay by: V. Vijayakumar
- Story by: Njanasheelan
- Produced by: Ramesh Cholayil
- Starring: Unni Mukundan; Mahalakshmi; Sreejith Ravi
- Cinematography: Ashok Devaraj
- Edited by: Achu Vijayan; Karthik
- Music by: M. Jayachandran; Mohan Sithara
- Production company: Kaivalyam Creations
- Distributed by: Screen Arts; Highness; Kaivalyam creations
- Release date: 25 May 2012
- Country: India
- Language: Malayalam

Ezham Suryan (transl. Seventh Sun) is a 2012 Indian Malayalam-language tragedy drama romantic film directed by debutant Njanasheelan starring Unni Mukundan, Sreejith Ravi and Mahalakshmi.

== Cast ==
- Unni Mukundan as Chitrabhanu (voiceover by Sarath Das)
- Mahalakshmi as Gopika (voiceover by Devi S.)
- Sreejith Ravi as Danny
- Saikumar as Vaazhakode Unnikrishnan Namboodiri
- Jagathy Sreekumar as Chakrapani
- Suraj Venjaramoodu
- Kalpana as Nalini
- Salim Kumar
- Kulappulli Leela as Omana
- Sulakshana as Gopika's mother
- Meghna Vincent as Gopika's sister
- Lintu Rony as Muthu
- Jayashree Sivadhas
- Meena Ganesh

== Production ==
The pooja for the film was held on 19 October 2011 in Thrissur. Njanasheelan worked on many television serials such as Niravathi and Janapriya before directing this film. Unni Mukundan plays a young father in the film. As of March 2012, his films that he finished working on and awaiting release were Mallu Singh (2012), this film and Ithu Pathiramanal (2013).

== Release ==
The film was dubbed in Tamil under the same name and was released in 2018 on Mega TV.
