= Nugam =

2013 Indian film by Jeffy

- Film poster
- Directed by: Jeffy
- Starring: Jai Bala; Vijayakumar; Ineya; Preethi
- Cinematography: E. K. Ramesh
- Edited by: A. L. Ramaweffegeggesh
- Music by: D. J. Gopinath; Thashi
- Production company: Synergy Creations
- Release date: 18 October 2013
- Running time: 149 minutes
- Country: India
- Language: Tamil

Nugam (transl. Yoke) is a 2013 Indian Tamil-language drama film written and directed by Jeffy and produced by Synergy Creations. The film features Jeybala, Ineya, Vijayakumar and Preethi in the lead roles. The film opened to negative reviews upon release on 18 October 2013.

== Cast ==
- Jeybala as Jai
- Vijayakumar as Kathir
- Ineya as Kathir's girlfriend
- Preethi as Yazhini
- Suresh as Suresh
- Reeshkadhir
- Ganja Karuppu
- Ravi
- Crane Manohar

== Production ==
Jeffy, making his second film after the unreleased Eerppu, shot scenes for the film in France and Switzerland as well as across Mumbai, Bangalore and Chennai. Jai Bala, who played the lead role in Eerppu, was also signed on by the director again to essay a lead role.

The audio of Nugam was released in Paris at the entrance to the Eiffel Tower by French actress Nadège Beausson-Diagne in April 2012. The team also later released a promotional song titled Share Love And Peace composed by Laurendo Joseph.

== Reception ==
The film opened to negative reviews from critics. The Times of India gave 1 out of 5 stars and wrote "Nugam wants to be a nail-biting, high-concept thriller but the only nail-biting that you do while watching the film is out of sheer frustration...the ham-fisted filmmaking and the even more amateurish performances (Jey's weird dialogue delivery is a definite contender for the worst line-reading ever in a film) turn it into an unintentional comedy". Behindwoods.com gave the film 0.75 out of 5 stars, labelling it as "poorly executed" and adding it was "a tiresome movie viewing experience". The New Indian Express labelled that the film had a "good plot gone awry".
