= Girls (2016 film) =

2016 Indian film by Thulasidas

- Poster in Malayalam
- Directed by: Thulasidas
- Written by: G.V.Renjith; Manoj
- Story by: G.V.Renjith; Manoj
- Produced by: K. Manikandan
- Starring: Nadhiya; Ineya; Eden
- Narrated by: Manju Warrier
- Cinematography: Sanjeev Shankar
- Edited by: K. Srinivas
- Music by: Arrol Corelli
- Production company: MJD Production
- Release date: 28 October 2016
- Country: India
- Languages: Malayalam; Tamil

Girls in Malayalam and Thiraikku Varadha Kathai (transl. The story the never came to the screen) in Tamil, is a 2016 Indian horror thriller film directed by Thulasidas. The film stars Nadhiya, with Eden and Ineya in supporting roles. The film released to negative reviews in October 2016.

== Plot ==
A group of friends are doing a diploma course at a film institute. As part of their studies, they have to make a movie, and the intriguing incidents during their film shoot at the high range form the plot.

== Cast ==
- Nadhiya as Deepika
- Ineya as Sophia
- Eden as Rehana/Merlin
- Aarthi as Soundarya
- Archana Suseelan as Anmary
- Reshma Pasupuleti as Clara
- Subiksha as Swathi
- Sajitha Madathil as the college professor
- Neena Kurup as the psychologist
- Kovai Sarala as Komalam
- Sabitha Anand as Sophia's mother
- Ambika Mohan as Merlin's mother
- Sethu Lakshmi as Meenakshi
- Parvathi T as lecturer Komalavalli

== Production ==
In December 2014, director Thulasidas was revealed to be making a bilingual Malayalam and Tamil horror thriller titled Girls featuring actress Iniya in the lead role. Initially titled Ini Varum Naatkal in Tamil, seven more actresses, Anusree, Aparna Nair, Archana, Muktha Bhanu, Subiksha and Seetha Lekshmi were later signed on to play other roles, with the shoot beginning thereafter in Wagomon. As the film progressed, some actresses dropped out and were replaced by actresses including Reshma, Sabitha, Sajitha Madathil and Neena Kurup, while Nadhiya also joined in late 2015 to play a significant character.

== Soundtrack ==
The songs was composed by M. G. Sreekumar.

Malayalam

Song	Playback	Duration
"June July"	Nayana	4:44
"Vannavanna Poove"	Manjari	4:12
"Azhakerum"	Saritha	4:20
"Thendrale Mazhai Sarale"	Ranjini Jose	4:53

Tamil

Song	Playback
"June July"	Nayana
"Vannavanna Poove"	Manjari
"Azhagana Maatram"	Saritha
"Thendrale Mazhai Sarale"	Ranjini Jose

== Reception ==
Reviewing Girls, Priya Sreekumar of Deccan Chronicle wrote, "Thulasidas is a veteran who has directed around 25 films as well as some long running popular serials. So he is not short on experience but his latest bi-lingual offering, Girls, seems an amateurish attempt by someone in the initial days of his directing career". Likewise, M. Suganth of The Times of India gave Thiraikku Varaadha Kadhai a similar review, citing "the pre-release buzz around Thiraikku Varaadha Kadhai has mostly centred around a lesbian angle in the film, but that proves to be counter-productive", adding that "the film is also irresponsible in a way because it furthers the negative stereotyping of LGBTs as persons with low moral values and murderers". Similarly, Malini Mannath of The New Indian Express stated "it was a knot that had the potential to turn into a riveting thriller, but it's opportunity lost here".
