= Oru Sarkar Ulpannam =

- Theatrical release poster
- Directed by: T. V. Renjith
- Written by: Nizam Rawther
- Produced by: T. V. Krishnan Thuruthi; Renjith Jaganathan; K. C. Raghunathan
- Starring: Subeesh Sudhi; Shelly Kishore; Gouri G Kishan; Vineeth Vasudevan; Darshana S Nair; Jayasree T.V
- Cinematography: Ansar Shah
- Edited by: Jithin D. K.
- Music by: Ajmal Hasbulla
- Production company: Bhavani Productions
- Release date: 8 March 2024
- Country: India
- Language: Malayalam

Oru Sarkar Ulpannam is a 2024 Indian Malayalam-language comedy drama film directed by T. V. Renjith. The film was released to positive reviews.

== Cast ==
- Subish Sudhi as Pradeepan
- Shelly Kishore as Shyama
- Gouri G Kishan as Divya
- Jaffer idukki as Rajan Left Party Leader
- Hareesh Kanaran as Ganeshan
- Vineeth Vasudevan as Subash
- Aju Varghese as Health Inspector Babusenan
- Darshana S. Nair as Advocate Haritha
- Joy Mathew as Judge
- Vijay Babu as Prosecution Advocate
- Gokulan as Velichappadu
- Lal Jose as Dasettan

== Production ==
The film was initially titled Oru Bharatha Sarkar Ulpannam. The film's writer Nizam Rawther died three days prior to the film's release.

== Reception ==
A critic from The New Indian Express wrote that "Amidst its low stakes and shortcomings, there's a certain earnestness in Oru Sarkar Ulpannam’s schematic storytelling, which majorly owes to Rawther's writing and the conviction of its actors". A critic from Times Now rated the film four out of five stars and wrote that "Oru Sarkar Ulpannam does not necessarily give you anything grand, but it does give you something that is grounded and simple and more importantly, good".
