= Persiakaran =

- Film poster
- Directed by: Asok R Nath
- Written by: Asok R Nath
- Produced by: Sanal Thottam; Hari Kumar Chakkaalil; Satheesh Vellayani; Sajeev Bhaskar
- Starring: Adil Ibrahim; Sudhakshina; Mukesh; Praveen Ram; Juby Ninan; Adithya hari
- Cinematography: Sanal Thottam
- Edited by: Rajesh Mangalakal
- Music by: Ranjith Meleppat
- Production company: New TV
- Release date: 10 October 2014
- Country: India
- Language: Malayalam

Persiakaran is a 2014 Indian Malayalam-language film directed by Asok R Nath, starring Adil Ibrahim, Sudhakshina, Mukesh, Praveen Ram, Juby Ninan, Rishi Prakash and Kochu Preman.

The film introduced close to 40 newcomers like Adithya Hari and Juby Ninan including the lead pair.

== Summary ==
Persiakaran filmed the life, hardships and troubles faced by the people who reach Middle East seeking a better life and the success and failure of the same who attempt to be the best.the producer is hari chakkalil.

== Cast ==
- Adil Ibrahim
- Sudhakshina
- Mukesh
- Praveen Ram
- Dinesh Paniker
- Juby Ninan
- Rishi Prakash
- Moideen Koya
- Kochu Preman
- Adithya Hari

== Reception ==
Now running rated the film with 1.5/5 stars stating the film as a " a mopey affair that gets increasingly frustrating with every passing moment." They concluded saying that the film lack individuality and falls short on insight that leaves the viewer unconvinced.
