= Peyad =

- suburb
- Nicknames: Peyadu, Vilappil
- Location in Kerala, India
- Coordinates: 8°30′29″N 76°59′54″E
- Country: India
- State: Kerala
- District: Thiruvananthapuram

Languages
  - Official: Malayalam, English
- Time zone: UTC+5:30 (IST)
- PIN: 695573
- Telephone code: 0471
- Vehicle registration: KL- 74
- Nearest city: Thiruvananthapuram

Peyad //peɪjɑd// is a place located in the suburb of Thiruvananthapuram, the capital city of Kerala state in India. The offices of Vilappil Grama Panchayath and Vilappil Village are situated at Peyad.

== Geography ==
Peyad is located at 8°30′29″N 76°59′54″E

== Location ==
Peyad is located very close to the capital city of Kerala, Thiruvananthapuram, on the east side of the city. Peyad can be reached from Thiruvananthapuram city centre by 4 different road routes, viz., via Karamana, Jagathy, Pangode (through the Army Cantonment area), or Sasthamangalam (PTP Nagar). Peyad Main Junction is on the main road connecting Thiruvananthapuram city to Kattakada. From Peyad junction, two roads lead in different directions: the east road leads to Kattakada, Neyyattinkara, Vellarada, and Neyyar Dam, and the north road leads to Vilappilshala, Puliyarakonam, Vellanadu, and so on.

Peyad is about 9 km away from Thiruvananthapuram city center. Regular bus services are available from Thiruvananthapuram Central Bus Station at Thampanoor or City Bus Station at East Fort.

Thiruvananthapuram Central Railway Station is the nearest railhead (10 km) and the nearest airport is Thiruvananthapuram International Airport(13 km).

== Other Features ==
Peyad is a residential area in the suburb of Trivandrum city a commercial junction in the Trivandrum-Kattakkada route. The land of Peyad is situated on the banks of the Karamana river. Aruvippuram, Kavadikkadavu, Pirayil Kovilkadavu and Kundamankadavu are river banks of Karamana river near to Peyad. What makes Peyad geographically important is its proximity to Trivandrum city center, the capital of Kerala. From Peyad main junction, Trivandrum Central Railway Station, Kerala Government Secretariat, Kerala Legislative Assembly, Kerala Raj Bhavan are just 9 km away and Trivandrum International Airport is just 13 KM away. Sri Padmanabha Swami Temple, Thiruvananthapuram is just 10 km away from Peyad. Trivandrum Technopark, the IT Hub of Kerala is 22 km northwest of Peyad and the Vizhinjam International Container Transhipment Terminal is also just 22 KM south of Peyad. Peyad has a better public bus transportation facility with Trivandrum City and with most of the places in the eastern part of Trivandrum District. As the main road connecting Trivandrum to Kattakkada and several other places like Vellanad, Aryanad, Vellarada is passing through Peyad, regular public transportation bus services are available to reach Peyad from Trivandrum Central Bus station at Thampanoor and City Bus Station (KSRTC & Private city buses) at East Fort, Trivandrum. A Main Post Office of the Indian Postal Department which comes under the postal circle of Neyyattinkara region is working at Peyad (PIN 695573) with four sub-post offices at Moongode, Perukavu, Puliyarakonam & Vilappilsalai which are satellite places of Peyad. Peyad is being urbanized rapidly in recent two decades and most of the agricultural land in Peyad has already been converted to residential areas in the past 2 decades. Various villa projects and residential flats are still under construction here. Peyad was famous for sawmills selling imported woods from foreign countries. Malackal Timbers and Sawmill situated near Peyad junction is the largest Saw Mill and wood seller. Peyad junction, Peyad Market Junction Peyad Pallimukku junction, Thachottukavu junction are major commercial centers. Thachottukavu junction is famous for grocery shops. There is a private fish market in Peyad market junction. SP Theatre and Convention Centre is situated near to Peyad main junction.

== Notable persons ==
- Jagathy Sreekumar- Malayalam film actor has been living here for the past 20 years
- Bharath Gopi- Erstwhile Malayalam film actor spent his last years in life at Peyad
- Sreekumaran Thampi- Malayalam film director and lyricist is residing here
- Kochu Preman- Malayalam film actor belongs to Valiyavila near Peyad

== Prominent Educational Institutions ==
- APJ Abdul Kalam Technological University Headquarters and Main Campus is under construction at Nedumkuzhi near Peyad
- Carmel CBSE School Vittiyam, Peyad
- Saraswathi Arts and Science College, Vilappilsalai
- St. Xaviers' Higher Secondary School, Peyad, Thiruvananthapuram
- N S S H S Chowalloor, Puliyarakonam
- Shantiniketan CBSE Higher Secondary School, Kunnumpuram
- Kannasa Mission High School, Peyad
- VIJAY School, Kattuvila, Peyad
- Green Valley International School, Near EMS Academy, Kavuvila Road, Vilappilsala. Read more on http://www.greenvalleyschools.in
- SIP academy peyad
- AVR School of Kindergarten, Peyad
- New Chempaka play school
- Rajiv Gandhi National School, Moongode
- Sathya Sai School, Puliyarakonam

== Other institutions near to Peyad ==
- EMS Academy, Vilappilsalai
- Laurie Baker Centre, Vilappilsalai
- Asianet Studio, Puliyarakonam
- Terumo Penpol Limited, Puliyarakonam - a subsidiary of Terumo Corp., Japan ( India's largest blood bag manufacturer)
- ALIND-RELAYS DIVISION (The Aluminium Industries Limited), Kavinpuram

== Health Centres and Hospitals ==
- SK Hospital, Peyad (Branch of SK Hospital, Idapazhanji)
- Kripa Hospital, Peyad
- SS Dental Clinic, Pallimukku, Peyad
- Abhayagramam Rehabilitation Center, Manchadi
- Matha Ayurveda Eye Hospital, Moongode
- Government Community Health Center, Vilappilsalai
- Travancore Hospital, Thachottukavu Junction
- Sanjeevani Siddha Ayurveda Hospital, Moongodu Road
- Government Homoeo Hospital, Perukavu
- DDRC SRL Diagnostics Private Limited, Peyad
- Ashwas Lab, Peyad

== Religious ==
Hindu Temples

- Ujjaini Mahakali Amman Kovil, Peyad
- Thachottukavu Sree Dharma Sastha Temple (Devaswom Board)
- Kavuvila Thampuram Temple
- Alanthrakonam Sree Thampuran Durga Devi khetram
- Sree Alakunnam Devi Kshetram,
- Karamkottukonam Sree Durga Bhagavathi Temple, Peyad.
- Thazhechirakkal Durga Parameswari kshethram
- Chirakonam Sree Thampuran Kshetram, Chirakonam, Peyad
- Alakunnam Mudippura, Alakunnam, Peyad
- Pirayil Sree Dharma Sastha Kshetram, Peyad
- Kundamankadavu Bhadrakali Kshetram, Peyad
- Aruvipuram Sree Mahavishnu kshetram, Aruvipuram, Peyad
- Thirunelliyoor Shiva Thampuran Temple, Peyad
- Sree Bhadrakali Temple Vittiyam, Peyad
- Venugopala Kshetram, Bhajanamadom, Peyad
- Chirathala Sree Mahadeva Temple, Peyad
- Cherupara Mahavishnu Temple, Peyad
- Thazhechirakkal Durga Parameswari Kshethram
- Karamkottukonam Sree Durga Bhagavathi Temple, Durga Nagar, Karamkottukonam, Peyad.
- Sree Bhadrakali Temple, Peyad
- Sreekanda Sastha Temple, Kavinpuram (Devaswom Board)
- Sreekanda Sastha Temple, Vilappilsala (Devaswom Board)

Christian Churches

- St. Xavier's Church, Peyad
- Assemblies of God Church Peyad
- Alfred Memorial CSI Church Peyad
- Pentecostal Church Vittiyam
- C S I Church Kattuvila

Islam Mosques

- Muslim Juma Masjid, Peyad

== Theater ==
- SP Cinemas 2K A-Class Releasing Movie Theater- (2 screens) Peyad

== Sports, Games and Fitness ==
- Oasis Indoor Turf & Football Academy, Thachottukavu
- Infinity Pro Sporting Turf, Karippur
- Sporty Monks Turf, Thachottukavu
- Smashington Indoor Badminton Court, Ezhakode, Pidaram

== Auditoriums ==
- SP Convention Center, Peyad
- TG Auditorium, Perukavu, Peyad

== Online Service Centers ==
- Akshaya Kendra, Market Junction, Peyad

== See also ==
- Malayinkeezhu
- Kurisumuttom
