= Radio (2013 film) =

- Movie Poster
- Directed by: Umer Mohammed
- Written by: Nizam Rawther
- Produced by: S. C. Pillai
- Starring: Iniya; Sarayu; Nishan; Sreejith Vijay
- Cinematography: Deepu S. Unni
- Edited by: Linson Raphel
- Music by: Mohan Sithara
- Production company: Vijay Combines
- Release date: 8 March 2013
- Running time: 145 minutes
- Country: India
- Language: Malayalam

Radio is a 2013 Malayalam–language drama film directed by Umer Mohammed and starring Iniya, Sarayu, Nishan and Sreejith Vijay in pivotal roles. The film was produced by S. C. Pillai whose previous production Passenger was a critical and commercial success.

== Plot ==
"Tune in for a change" is the tagline attached to Radio in the credits. The storyline is about a girl Priya who comes to the city for a job as a salesgirl in a jewellery shop, with a load of debt to pay off, played by Sarayu. She is new to the ways and customs of the city life. Her co-worker, Shweta, gives her accommodation, since she has no place or relative's house to stay in the city. Shweta goes out every night, where Manu comes to pick her up. The entire storyline is clear, Shweta, a five star prostitute and associate Manu as pimp, for securing her business. It is a shock to Priya when she realizes the truth about Shweta and decides to leave her friendship and apartment.

A set back comes to Priya because of her need of cash, for her mother's operation, which Shweta supports by her extra -profession. Since Priya's requirement is cash, she too falls for the lucrative offers, to trade her body, if she wants to, for a psychiatrist doctor to provide him company for 1 or 2 years.

Meanwhile, Shweta's family decides to go ahead with a marriage proposal for her. She tries to avoid engagement. But the bridegroom is determined to take her in, and forget her past. She agrees for marriage, and they marries. One of her clients happens to be her husband's friend, and his visits their house, adding up slight sparks of fire.

Priya follows her pro-life with the doctor and finally ends up cheated by her family and the doctor when his wife and daughter who abandoned him, returns from States. At last Priya becomes mad.

== Cast ==
- Iniya as Swetha
- Sarayu Mohan as Priya
- Nishan as Manu
- Thalaivasal Vijay as Doctor
- Jayakrishnan as Jayan
- Maniyanpilla Raju as Priya's father
- Kochu Preman as Zakhir Hussain
- Harishree Ashokan as Johnson
- Narayanankutty as S.I.
- Irshad as Pradeesh Nair
- Shobha Mohan as Jayan's Mother
- Thesni Khan Dhamayanthi
- Nihal as Ravi
- Kalabhavan rahman as Radio Meman
- Ambika Mohan as Swetha's mother

== Reception ==
The film received moderate to good reviews especially the first half of the movie is praised.
