= Kurisumuttom =

- Village
- Location within Kerala Location within India
- Coordinates: 08°30′27″N 77°0′46″E
- Country: India
- State: Kerala
- District: Thiruvananthapuram

Government
  - Body: Gram panchayat
  - Member of Parliament: Shashi Tharoor (Lok Sabha)

Languages
  - Official: Malayalam · English
  - Spoken languages: Malayalam(മലയാളം) · English
- Time zone: UTC+5:30 (IST)
- PIN: 695 XXX
- Telephone code: 91 (0)471
- Vehicle registration: KL-01, KL-22
- Sex ratio: 1064 ♂/♀
- Literacy: 93.72%
- Climate: Am/Aw (Köppen)
- Precipitation: 1,700 millimetres (67 in)
- Avg. annual temperature: 27.2 °C (81.0 °F)
- Avg. summer temperature: 35 °C (95 °F)
- Avg. winter temperature: 24.4 °C (75.9 °F)

Kurisumuttom (also spelled Kurismuttam) is a locality near to Peyad in the Thiruvananthapuram district of Kerala state, India. The place is situated in the Vilavoorkal Panchayat. It is situated in the south side of Thiruvananthapuram - Kattakkada road, between Thirumala and Peyad. It is 8 Kilometers away from Thiruvananthapuram city. Kurismuttam is under the Peyad Post Office area (PIN 695573).

== Nearby places ==
- St. Xaviers HSS, Peyad
- Kundamanbhagom
- Sky City
- Bharathiya Vidya Bhavan Senior Secondary School
- Jai Nagar, Thirumala
- Guru Gopinath Natanagramam
- Abraham Memorial Higher Secondary School (AMHSS), Thirumala
- Nandanam Hills
- Laurie Baker Centre for Habitat Studies (LBC)
- PEYAD Junction (Commercial Centre)
