= Parole (2018 film) =

- Theatrical release poster
- Directed by: Sharrath Sandith
- Written by: Ajith Poojappura
- Produced by: Antony D'Cruz
- Starring: Mammootty; Ineya; Miya; Suraj Venjaramoodu; Siddique
- Cinematography: Loganathan Srinivasan
- Edited by: Suresh Urs
- Music by: Songs: Sharreth; Ellwyn Joshua; Aristo Suresh; Score: Sharreth
- Production company: Antony D'Cruz Entertainment
- Distributed by: Century Films
- Release date: 6 April 2018
- Running time: 150 minutes
- Country: India
- Language: Malayalam

Parole is a 2018 Indian Malayalam-language drama thriller film directed by Sharath Sandhith in his feature film debut and written by Ajith Poojappura, based on a true story. It stars Mammootty, Ineya, Miya, Siddique, Suraj Venjaramoodu and Prabhakar. Principal photography began on 14 June 2017 in Bangalore. Loganathan Srinivasan was the cinematographer and Suresh Urs was the editor. Songs and score are composed by Sharreth.

Parole was released on 6 April 2018 in India.

== Plot ==
Alex "Mestri" Philippose is living a happy life with his epileptic wife Annie and their son Shine. One day, he loses his temper and slaps Annie, triggering a fit which causes her to fall into a well. He fails to save her and his attempts are seen as proof that he killed her. He goes to jail. The first parole application is rejected since his son does not sign it, thinking he will be targeted next. After his sister Kathrina's death, he finally succeeds in getting parole, with the intention of seeing his son. After many attempts, he locates his son, but is distraught when he learns that he is a petty criminal, working for Sudarshan, a local drug kingpin. His son is brought in for questioning, but is taken by Sudarshan. Alex finds Sudarshan, beats him up and rescues his son.

The police officer investigating the case threaten to arrest Shine, but decides to arrest Alex instead when he is reminded that his own son, one of Shine's friends, would also be incarcerated. The movie ends with everyone realising about Alex's innocence as he goes back to jail for another crime he did not commit.

== Cast ==
- Mammootty as Alex Mestri / Alex Philippose / Sakhavu Alex, a communist leader
  - Nebish Benson as Young Alex
- Siddique as Abdu
- Suraj Venjaramoodu as Varghese
- Ineya as Annie
- Miya as Kathrina
- Lalu Alex as SP Jacob Sam
- Prabhakar as Bullet Raghavan
- V. K. Prakash as Krishnan Nair
- Alencier Ley Lopez as Sakhavu Philippose, Alex's father (a senior communist leader)
- Sudheer Karamana as Vattakannan Suku
- Juby Ninan as Rajkumar
- Sijoy Varghese as Varkkichen
- Irshad as Bennychen
- Madan Mohan as Vinod
- T. S. Raju as Sadasivan
- Padmaraj Ratheesh
- Sohan Seenulal
- Ashwin Kkumar
- Kalabhavan Haneef as Aani
- Kalasala Babu
- Krishna Kumar as Sandeep Raj
- Chembil Ashokan
- Kalinga Sasi as Kili
- Muthumani as Hazeena
- Aristo Suresh
- Harshitha Pisharady
- Ganapathi
- Vishak Nair
- Rony David
- Hariprashanth M G as Sudarshan
- Thankachan Vithura
- Emil George

== Production ==
This is the feature film directorial debut of advertisement film maker Sharrath Sandith, who announced the film in May 2017 with Mammootty whom he had been directing for last 12 years for ad films and Miya George in cast. He said the other cast would be finalised after the filming began, and planned to shoot the film in two schedules to be in Bangalore and Kerala. The screenplay is based on a real life story. The untitled film began principal photography on 14 June 2017 in Bangalore, with 25-days schedule planned there. Mammootty plays a prisoner and Communist comrade, while Juby Ninan, who also co-produced the film, and Lalu Alex appear in jail wardens' roles. In December first, Sharrath revealed Miya's role as Mammootty's sister and stated that filming would be wrapped up in 10 days.

The film was shot in digital CinemaScope and 4K cinematography was employed. The filming took place in around 75 days, of which 25 days were part of prison sequences in Bangalore. Other parts were shot in and around Thodupuzha.

== Music ==
Parole

Soundtrack album by Sharreth, Ellwyn Joshua, Aristo Suresh Score: Sharreth
- Released: 2018
- Genre: Feature film soundtrack
- Length: 17:21
- Language: Malayalam
- Label: Manorama Music

Sharreth chronology
Naa Nuvve (2018)	Parole (2018)	Autorsha (2018)
External audio
- Parole – Jukebox on YouTube

Aristo Suresh chronology
Kuttanadan Marpappa (2018)	Parole (2018)	Cuban Colony (2018)

The film has songs composed by Sharreth, Ellwyn Joshua, and Aristo Suresh.

Track listing
No.	Title	Lyrics	Music	Singer(s)	Length
1.	"Chuvanna Pulari"	Rafeeq Ahamed	Sharreth	Vijay Yesudas	4:31
2.	"Ilakalai Pookalai"	B. K. Harinarayanan	Ellwyn Joshua	Vijay Yesudas, Shakthisree Gopalan	4:03
3.	"Theyyaram Thalam"	Sreeparvathi	Sharreth	Sharreth	2:23
4.	"Parol Kalam"	Aristo Suresh	Aristo Suresh	Aristo Suresh	2:49
5.	"Iyya Ka Naubadu"	Shihab Ghanem	Sharreth	Jithin Raj	3:35
Total length:					17:21

== Release ==
On 29 March, due to a delay in obtaining the clearance certificate from the Animal Welfare Board of India, which had to be submitted to the Central Board of Film Certification to attain the film's censor certificate, the original release date of 31 March 2018 was pushed to 6 April.

=== Critical reception ===
Sanjith Sidhardhan of The Times of India rated the film three in a scale of five and said, "Parole has the elements that would appeal to a family audience – action, drama and sentiments – but a taut script and trimmed first half would have made it an even more engaging venture."

Financial Express wrote that "Mammootty wins hearts as Sakhavu Alex in this melodrama" and labelled the film as "entertaining".

Anna M. M. Vetticad of Firstpost rated 1 out of 5 stars and said, "Parole is not Mammootty's worst, but if you have seen him at his best, you have to wonder what on earth he is thinking when he picks scripts these days – or whether he is thinking at all.".

Sify said, "With a script that is melodramatic to the core, the film looks old fashioned and follows a narrative pattern that would have been fine, maybe some decades back".
