= Female Unnikrishnan =

- Promotional poster
- Directed by: K. B. Madhu
- Story by: Sudheesh John
- Produced by: K.B. Madhu
- Starring: Suraj Venjaramoodu; Anoop Menon; Mahalakshmi
- Cinematography: M.J. Radhakrishnan
- Edited by: G. Murali
- Music by: Shaji Sukumaran
- Release date: 11 December 2015
- Country: India
- Language: Malayalam

Female Unnikrishnan (Note: The film's title refers to the titular character who has a female voice. Unnikrishnan is also the name of a singer.) is a 2015 Indian Malayalam language comedy film directed by K. B. Madhu. The film stars Suraj Venjaramoodu, Anoop Menon and Mahalakshmi in the lead roles along with Jagadish, Salim Kumar, Devan and Bijukuttan. The film is directed by K B Madhu, while the music is composed by Shaji Sukumaran. The screenplay is based on a story written by Sudheesh John.

== Plot ==
The film is about the story of a man named Unnikrishnan who has a female voice. He is insulted by the whole village because of his deformity. He tries many ways to overcome his problem but all goes in vain. Therefore, he is not able to move forward in society and achieve his ambitions. The film revolves around his self realisation. Later, his friend Dravyan, a marriage broker gets him married to a rich woman named Gowri, who is speech impaired. But Soon, he finds that she had been rendered speechless after an incident that also involved her cousin Hari. This makes a lot of changes in his life. This is portrayed in a very comical way in this film.

== Cast ==
- Suraj Venjaramoodu as Unnikrishnan
- Anoop Menon as Hari Nair
- Mahalakshmi as Gowri
- Salim Kumar as Thamarakulam Dravian
- Jagadish
- Biju Kuttan as Docomo Paapan
- Devan as Madhavan Nair
- Kalaranjini as Unni's mother
- Kulappulli Leela as Maid
- Dinesh Panicker as college priest
- Kochu Preman as Headmaster
- Kalabhavan Prajod as Warrier
- Niyaz Musaliar as Gowri's brother

== Production ==
The film was shot in Munnar, Thodupuzha and Vagamon. In 2010.

== Soundtrack ==
The film's music is composed by Shaji Sukumaran.

- "Ayalathe" – Rajalakshmi, Vijay Yesudas
- "Gopimurali" – K S Chitra
- "Gopimurali" – Josesagar
- "Kaathoram" – Jeethu Ramachandran
- "Konjathe" – Jassie Gift

== Reception ==
Veeyen of Nowrunning rated the film 1 1/2 out of 5 and wrote that "Female Unnikrishnan goes on a steady downward spiral, in spite of its characters trying real hard all along to make the plot work! A pretty flimsy film that hardly qualifies as substantial entertainment, Female Unnikrishnan is nothing more than a tough slog.
