= Ardhanaari =

2012 Indian Malayalam-language film

- Theatrical release poster
- Directed by: Santhosh Souparnika
- Written by: Santhosh Souparnika
- Produced by: M. G. Sreekumar
- Starring: Manoj K. Jayan; Mahalakshmi; Thilakan; Sukumari; Sai Kumar
- Cinematography: Hemachandran
- Edited by: Abhilash Viswanath
- Music by: M. G. Sreekumar
- Production companies: MG Sound & Frames Company
- Distributed by: MG Sound & Frames Release
- Release date: 23 November 2012 (Kerala)
- Country: India
- Language: Malayalam

Ardhanaari is a 2012 Indian Malayalam-language film about the life of transgender people in Kerala. The film is directed by Santhosh Souparnika and produced by M. G. Sreekumar under his production house MG Sound & Frames.

Manjula (Manoj K. Jayan), is a transgender hijra; her male physique and female behavioural traits lead to ridicule and snide remarks from her brother and others. The film concerns the rituals, customs, angst and preferences of hijra. The title of the film alludes to the half-male and half-female Hindu god Ardhanarishvara. Also starring in the film are Mahalakshmi, Maniyanpilla Raju, Thilakan, Sukumari and Sai Kumar. It was one of the last films featuring Thilakan, who died from a heart attack weeks before the release of the film.

Ardhanaari garnered mixed critical reviews, as did Jayan's performance.

== Plot ==
Manjula (Manoj K Jayan) attends school and falls in love with their male classmate. The feminine charms and effeminate ways of Manjula are ridiculed by many barring this one person, who promises to marry them once they are grown up and ready to face the world.

Years later, their romance is on in full swing, until Manjula and their quaint ways bring disgrace to their family. Thrown out of their home, they seeks refuge with a group of transvestites who welcome them into their clan with open arms. To make matters worse, they are spurned in love as well.

Manjula's trials and tribulations bring them face to face with a predicament related to their very identity that is no easy crisis to deal with. The realization that their distinctiveness renders them the cynosure of public attention is something that they eventually learn to live with, but the scars that are meted out to them in the process remain unhealed for life.

== Analysis ==
From the few films that have earlier had effeminate men playing the lead roles, 'Ardhanaari' is singular in that it doesn't make its hero fall in love with a girl. Issues of sexuality are more out in the open here, and Manjula assumes the role of a wife to a man who proclaims to be in love with him. Manjula chooses a man to live with, though she also confesses that she could fall in love with a woman.

The cliches that are bound to creep in into any film that discusses issues on sexuality enter 'Ardhanaari' too without fail. An older hijda (Maniyanpillai Raju) falls sick and as she is carried over to her pyre, lessons on the dangers of unsafe sex are put forward on a platter. No thought on sexuality seems complete without HIV barging in to make a statement.

== Cast ==
- Manoj K. Jayan as Manjula / Vinayan
- Mahalakshmi as Kokila
- Thilakan as Nayak
- Maniyanpilla Raju as Jameela
- Sukumari as the priest
- Sai Kumar as Manjula's Father
- Thesni Khan as Manjula's sister
- Kochu Preman as the school teacher
- Irshad as Manjula's brother
- Jayakrishnan as Balu Menon, Manjula's love interest
- Asha Sarath as Balu Menon's wife

== Awards ==
- Nominated—Filmfare Award for Best Actor – Malayalam - Manoj K. Jayan
- Nominated—SIIMA Award for Best Actor - Manoj K. Jayan
