= Pengalila =

Indian drama film

- Film poster
- Directed by: T. V. Chandran
- Written by: T. V. Chandran
- Produced by: Benazir
- Starring: Lal; Akshara Kishor
- Cinematography: Santhosh Thundiyil
- Edited by: V. T. Sreejith
- Music by: Score: Bijibal; Songs: Vishnu Mohan Sithara
- Production company: Benzy Productions
- Distributed by: Benzy Release
- Release date: 8 March 2019
- Running time: 111 min
- Country: India
- Language: Malayalam

Pengalila (lit. 'Sister leaf') is a 2019 Malayalam–language Indian drama film written and directed by T. V. Chandran. The film portrays the emotional bond between Radha (Baby Akshara Kishor), an 8-year-old girl and Azhagan (Lal), a 65-year-old daily wage worker who comes to clean up the backyard of Radha's house. The film started production in August 2018. It released on 8 March 2019.

== Cast ==
- Lal as Azhagan
- Akshara Kishore as Radhalekshmi
- Narain as Vinod
- Renji Panicker as Koshy Mathew
- Indrans
- Ineya as Rekha
- Basil Paulose as Thomas
- Thirunal
- Naushad
- Priyanka Nair as Dr. Radhalekshmi
- Telly Sebastian (Played younger age of Lal)
- Neethu Chandran
- Ambili Sunil
- Sheela Sasi
- Marina Michael
