= Anjali Nair =

Anjali Nair may refer to:

- Anjali Nair (actress, born 1988), Indian actress primarily in Malayalam films
- Anjali Nair (actress, born 1995), Indian actress in Tamil films
