= Money Ratnam =

Money Rathnam
- Movie poster
- Directed by: Santhosh Nair
- Written by: Anil Narayanan; Ajith C.Lokesh
- Produced by: Raju Mathew
- Starring: Fahadh Faasil; Nivetha Thomas; Renji Panicker
- Cinematography: Neil D`Cunha
- Edited by: Manoj
- Music by: Prashanth Pillai
- Distributed by: Century Films
- Release date: 26 September 2014
- Country: India
- Language: Malayalam

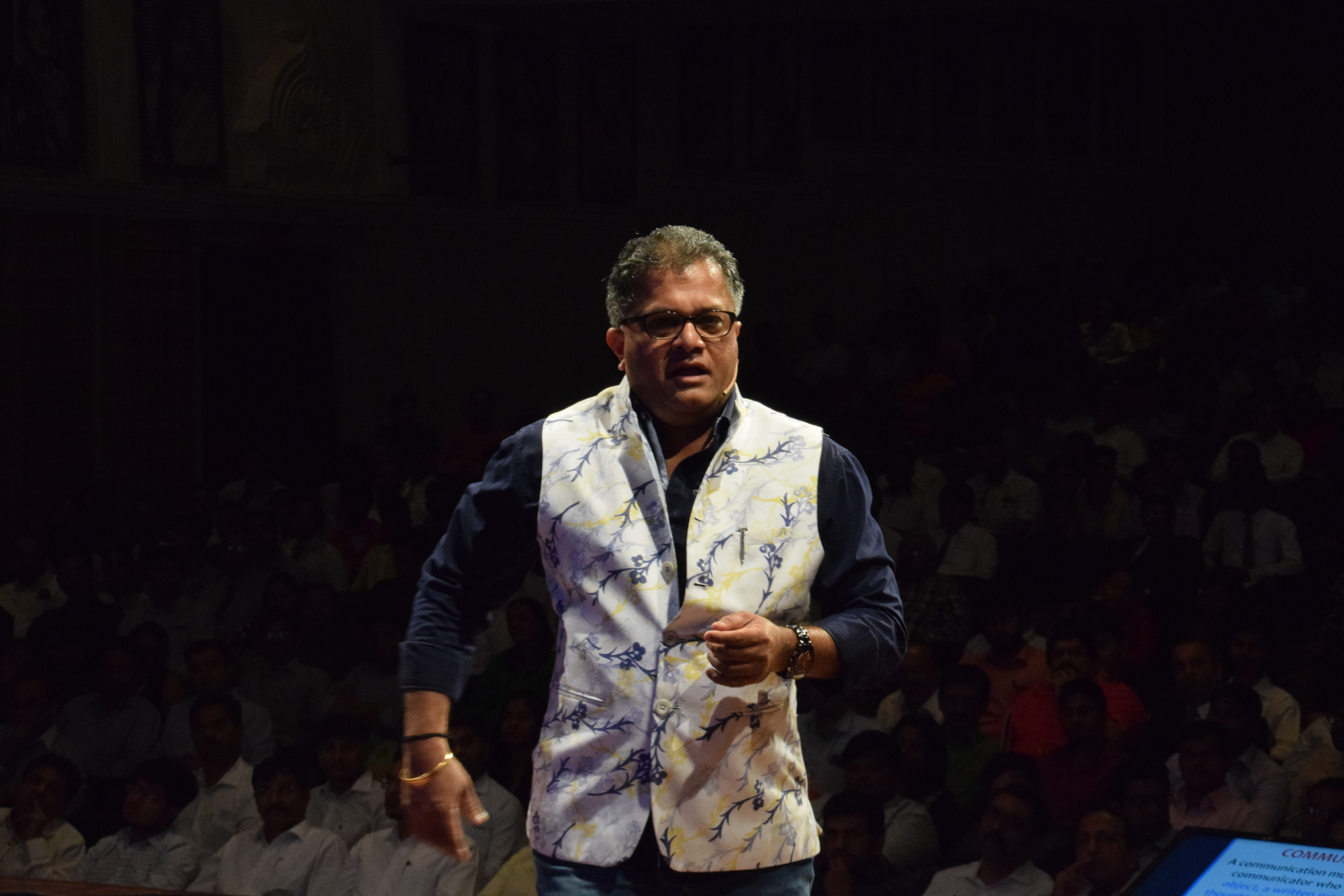
Santosh Nair at Mumbai in 2017

Money Ratnam (transl. Money Diamond; also a pun on the name of the Indian filmmaker) is a 2014 Indian Malayalam comedy thriller film, directed by Santhosh Nair (in his directorial debut). starring Fahadh Faasil and Niveda Thomas. Touted to be a road movie, which is loosely adapted from Hindi movie Ek Chalis Ki Last Local (2007), it narrates a story that happen in a 24-hour time frame during a journey from Munnar to Marayur. Scripted by Anil Narayanan and Ajith C. Lokesh, the music department was handled by Prashanth Pillai, while the camera was helmed by Neel D. Kunha. Money Ratnam is the 100th film of the production house Century Films. The film's locations include Udumalpet, Pollachi, Ernakulam, and Sholayar. It released on 26 September 2014 as an Onam release.

== Plot ==
Neil John Samuel is a showroom executive in Ernakulam. After the New Year party, fortunately Neel gets a bag of money. With the money, Neil reaches a village in Tamil Nadu. Four people with an intention to buy diamonds also arrive at the same spot. All are connected with the cash which is in the hands of Neil.

== Cast ==
- Fahadh Faasil as Neil John Samuel, sales manager in a Benz showroom
- Nivetha Thomas as Pia Mammen
- Renji Panicker as Isaac
- Chembil Ashokan as Joppan Kannamali
- Sasi Kalinga as Kareem
- Joju George as Makudi Das
- Sunil Sukhada as the astrologer
- Kochu Preman as Gopi
- Leema Babu as Divya
- Balu Varghese as Joppan's nephew
- Dinesh Prabhakar as Cleetus
- Sudhi Koppa as Cleetus' friend
- Sidhartha Siva as the taxi driver
- Jaffar Idukki as the Tempo driver
- Reena Basheer as Salomi, Issac's wife
- Aarthi as the scooty driver
- Navin Kumar as Kumar, Divya's love interest
- Nandhan Unni as Suni, Das' brother
- Dileep Shankar as Tony
- Archana Menon as Neil's mom
- Indira Thampy as the mother in the taxi

== Home video ==
Manorama Music released the VCD, DVD and Blu-ray of the movie on 5 December 2014.

== Critical reception ==
The Hindu wrote, "Money Ratnam has its moments, offers a few laughs, does not give you one of those splitting headaches and is your money's worth". The Times of India gave 3 stars out of 5 and wrote, "The film is not logically perfect, but it sure brings out the slapstick comedian in Fahad, hitherto untapped...the director shows good promise and the film is worth a watch, solely for the humour". Rediff gave 2.5 stars out of 5 and called the film "an above-average, unpretentious entertainer". The New Indian Express wrote, "Despite...minor hiccups, it is a comedy film, entertaining and engaging throughout".
