= Honey Bee (2013 film) =

- Film poster
- Directed by: Lal Jr.
- Written by: Lal Jr.
- Produced by: Siby Thottupuram; Jobi Mandamattom
- Starring: Lal; Asif Ali; Bhavana; Baburaj; Sreenath Bhasi; Balu Varghese; Archana Kavi; Assim Jamal
- Cinematography: Alby
- Edited by: Ratheesh Raj
- Music by: Deepak Dev
- Production company: SJM Entertainments
- Distributed by: Kalasangham Films
- Release date: 7 June 2013
- Running time: 138 minutes
- Country: India
- Language: Malayalam
- Box office: est. ₹12 crore (US$1.2 million)

Honey Bee (also known as Honey Bee: Its Tripping) is a 2013 Indian Malayalam-language romantic comedy-thriller film written and directed by Lal Jr. The film features an ensemble cast including Asif Ali, Bhavana, Lal, Baburaj, Sreenath Bhasi, Archana Kavi, Balu Varghese, Vijay Babu, Suresh Krishna and Assim Jamal in the lead roles.

The story revolves around two friends, Sebastian and Angel, who suddenly discover their love for each other. They elope on the eve of Angel's marriage, much to the chagrin of her brothers. The film essays the lovers' struggle for survival.

It was released on 6 June 2013 to mixed reviews from critics and succeeded at the box office.

== Plot ==
Sebastian (a.k.a. Seban), Abu, Ambrose Perera, Fernando d'Silva (a.k.a. Ferno), Angel and Sara are close friends in Fort Kochi. Angel's brothers HC Michael, Martin, Father Collin, and Antony, nicknamed "Punyalanmar", are dangerous businessmen. Angel's family brings in a proposal for her from the city SI George.

Angel asks Seban if he has feelings for her, to which he says he does not, before she admits that she had feelings for him. On the night before her marriage, a drunk Seban breaks into Angel's house with his friends and professes his love for her. He elopes with her that night with his friends' help. Ambrose, drunk and senseless writes a letter and leaves it in Angel's room to inform Punyalanmar, that they had helped Seban and Angel elope. The next day Sebastian wakes up to see Angel with him. He is shocked to see her since he doesn't remember the previous night's events. Punyalanmar goes in search of them, and they are on the run. Punyalanmar destroys Sebastian's house and burns Ferno's house.

Seban and Angel decide to escape through the harbor. Abu, Ambrose and Ferno planned to confront and surrender to buy Seban and Angel time to escape. Punyalanmar captures Abu but Ferno and Ambrose threaten to kill their wives. Ferno calls Seban (who is on a boat) and says they are going to sacrifice themselves, and Ferno is stabbed by Michael's goon. Seeing Angel's brothers coming after them, they decide to commit suicide. Seban and Angel kiss each other passionately. then it is revealed in the flashback that her brothers did not kill Seban's friends and that they were also there with her brothers in the boat they were coming after. But without knowing this Seban and Angel jump into the sea after kissing each other. Seban's friends jump into the sea to save them. The film has a happy ending in which all are praying together at Punyalanmar's father's tomb, and then heading for Seban's and Angel's wedding.

== Cast ==
- Lal as HC Mikhael Punyalan
- Asif Ali as Sebastian Kalathiparambil
- Bhavana as Angel Punyalan
- Baburaj as Fernando D'Silva
- Sreenath Bhasi as Abu Mohammed Dada
- Balu Varghese as Ambrose Perera
- Archana Kavi as Sara Perera
- Suresh Krishna as Father Cochin/Collin Punyalan
- Assim Jamal as Antony Punyalan
- Amith Chakalakkal as Martin Punyalan
- Vijay Babu as SI George
- Praveena as Lisa
- Melba Babu as Ancy
- Joy Mathew as Cleetus
- Ponnamma Babu as Ferno's mother
- Reena Basheer as Abu's mother
- Staton Edward as Danny, Gang Leader
- Ajay Natarajan as Simon
- Sushin Shyam as Jacob
- Staton Edward as Danny
- Pradeep Kottayam as Bevco Man
- James Parakkel as Bevco Man
- Sivan as Jose
- Siby Thouttupuram as James Mathew
- Baby Lulu as Clara
- Jemcy as Goon
- Liki as Goon
- Khais as Goon
- Sasi Kalinga as Punyalan (Photo Archive)
- Rayan Raj as Dance Actor (Cameo Appearance)
- Mythili (Cameo Appearance)

== Soundtrack ==
Honey Bee

Soundtrack album by Deepak Dev
- Released: June 2013
- Genre: Film soundtrack
- Length: 11:29
- Language: Malayalam

Deepak Dev chronology
Aaru Sundarimaarude Katha (2013)	Honey Bee (2013)	Ezhamathe Varavu (2013)

The film's soundtrack contains 3 songs, all composed by Deepak Dev. Lyrics by Kaithapram, Lal, Anu Elizabeth Jose.

Track listing
No.	Title	Singer(s)	Length
1.	"Machane Machane Machu"	Deepak Dev, Sreecharan, Vinod Varma	3:32
2.	"Ennalakale"	Lal, Job Kurian	3:58
3.	"Neeyo Neeyo"	Vinod Varma, Rajalakshmi Abhiram	3:59
Total length:			11:29

== Release ==
The filming was started in March 2013 and released on 7 June 2013 in 75 screens across Kerala.

=== Critical reception ===
The received mixed reviews from critics. Oneindia.in said, "Jean Paul Lal has chosen a good script, which is interesting. The director has tried to keep you engaged and glued to the screen throughout the movie. The suspense in the climax is also very interesting and sure to impress youth." Veeyen of Nowrunning.com rated the film 2.5 out 5 and said, "Honey Bee is a film to be savored like those quickie bites that you grab from a fast-food restaurant. Its damn fun while it lasts in your mouth and you swallow it without much of a thought, knowing all the while that it never had plans to offer you something to chew on."

== Sequel ==
The crew had announced the sequel of Honey Bee immediately after the release of the movie. Later Lal Jr. teamed up with Asif Ali for the psycho-thriller Hi I'm Tony, which had Lal in the title role. Due to some reasons, the sequel was delayed for two years. Later, the director announced that apart from the original cast, Sreenivasan and Lena would also be seen essaying vital roles in the film. The sequel was released on 23 March 2017.

A making story of the sequel, Honey Bee 2.5 was released which was directed by Shyju Anthikkad.
