= Assim Jamal =

Indian Regional Film Actor ( Malayalam Film Industry)

- Born: Thrissur, Kerala, India
- Occupations: Actor; dubbing artist
- Years active: 2008-present

Assim Jamal is an Indian actor who works in Malayalam films. He made his acting debut in the 2008 film Kurukshetra, which was directed by Major Ravi in which he appeared as a Pakistani official. He is known for his portrayal of villains. He did notable roles in Kurukshetra, Anwar, Casanovva, Honey Bee, Pakida, Lord Livingstone 7000 Kandi and Anarkali. His performance in Anwar earned him roles in Honey Bee and Pakida, which were largely appreciated.

== Filmography ==
Year	Title	Role	Notes
2008	Kurukshetra	Hydher	
2009	Ividam Swargamanu	Hotel Manager / Property Agent	
2010	Anwar	Saleem	
2011	The Way Home	Terrorist	
2012	Casanovva	Arun	
2012	Diamond Necklace	Venu's Roommate	
2012	Ustad Hotel	Moideen	
2013	Cowboy	Khalid	
2013	Honey Bee	Antony (Punyalan Brothers)	
2014	Pakida	Stephen	
2014	Rajadhi Raja	Gangster	
2015	Lord Livingstone 7000 Kandi	Banglore Brothers	
2015	Anarkali	SI Jamal Majnu	
2017	Honey Bee 2:Celebrations	Antony (Punyalan Brothers)	
2017	Georgettan's Pooram	Anil M	
2017	Varnyathil Aashanka	SI Binoy Mathew	
2017	Honey Bee 2.5	Himself	Cameo appearance
2017	Diwanji Moola Grand Prix	Ahmed	
2019	Allu Ramendran	Sathyan	
2019	Argentina Fans Kaattoorkadavu	Munir Koduvally	
2019	Anjaam Pathiraa	Commissioner Hashim Mohamed	
2022	Thallumaala	Abid	
2023	Romancham	Benny	Cameo appearance
2024	Abraham Ozler	DIG Prasad Rajan	
2026	Sambhavam Adhyayam Onnu	SI M.G.Ashokan	
