= Vichithram =

2022 Indian Malayalam-language film

- First look poster
- Directed by: Achu Vijayan
- Written by: Nikhil Ravindran
- Starring: Shine Tom Chacko; Balu Varghese
- Cinematography: Arjun Balakrishnan
- Edited by: Achu Vijayan
- Music by: Jubair Muhammed; Street Academics
- Production company: Joy Movie Productions
- Release date: 14 October 2022
- Country: India
- Language: Malayalam

Vichithram (transl. Unusual) is a 2022 Indian Malayalam-language mystery thriller film directed by Achu Vijayan, produced by Ajith Joy and Achu Vijayan under the banner Joy Movie Productions. The screenplay was written by Nikhil Ravindran. The film features Shine Tom Chacko, Balu Varghese, Lal, and Kani Kusruti. Arjun Balakrishnan is handling the cinematography and the music is composed by Jubair Muhammed along with the well known alternative hip-hop group Street Academics.

== Premise ==
The strange goings on at a palatial, old bungalow when a woman named Jasmine and her five sons move in is the basis of the plot. And each of the sons has a distinct personality. Jolly Chirayath portrayed the role of Jasmine.Her five sons Jackson, Joyner, Justin and twins, Stephan and Savio; are essayed by Shine Tom Chacko, Balu Varghese, Vishnu, and real-life twins Shihan and Shiyan respectively.

== Cast ==
- Shine Tom Chacko as Jackson
- Balu Varghese as Joyner
- Lal as Alexander
- Kani Kusruti as Marth
- Trisha Nair as Nathama
- Ketaki Narayan as Sanghamithra
- Vishnu Anand as Justin
- Abhiram Radhakrishnan as Jango
- Avantika Ajith as Diya
- Aryan Menon as Kuttu
- Manoj Nair as Ijay
- Sinoj Varghese as Chandi

== Reception ==
Anjana George, critic of The Times of India, gave 4 stars out of 5 and stated that "Watch into theatres to get chills and giggles out of you." S.R. Praveen, critic of The Hindu, wrote that "Thriller gives a clever twist to an overused horror trope". Padmakumar K, critic of Onmanorama, wrote that "Perhaps this could be the only prod to watch the movie. Sajin Shrijith, critic of Cinema Express, gave 4 stars out of 5 and appreciated the film. The critic from OTTplay said that "If you are a fan of slow-burn dramas about dysfunctional families, then the details and performances in Vichithram make it a good watch" and gave 3 out of 5.
