= Ponnamma Babu =

Indian film actress

- Born: 26 January 1964 (age 62); Bharananganam, Palai, Kottayam
- Occupation: Actress
- Years active: 1996–present
- Spouse: Babu
- Children: Deepthy James, Mathew Damien, Pinky Robin
- Parent(s): Mathai, Achamma

Ponnamma Babu is an Indian actress best known for her work in Malayalam cinema. She has acted in more than 300 films, TV serials and comedy shows. She made her debut in Padanayakan in 1996.

== Personal life ==
Ponnamma was born to Mathai and Achamma in Bharananganam, Pala, Kottayam. She has 3 younger siblings. She had her primary education at St George High School, Aruvithura. She made her debut in Padanayakan in 1996. While in school, she joined Nrithabhavan Balesangham, Poonjar and later Surabhila Drama troupe, Ettumaanur. She is married to Babu, the owner of Surabhila Drama troupe. Ponnamma's daughter, Pinky, is an up-and-coming actress who made her debut in Nakshathrangal, a 2014 Malayalam movie whereas the first film she acted in, Mr. Pavanayi 99.99, is not yet released.

== Filmography ==
=== 1990s ===
Year	Title	Role	Notes
1993	Sowbhagyam	Drama artist	
1993	Uppukandam Brothers	Pankajakshan's wife	
1996	Ishtamanu Nooru Vattam	Singer for interview	
1996	Padanayakan	Seetha's mother	
1996	Udyanapalakan	Shantha	
1996	Swarnakireedam	Padmavathi	
1996	Excuse Me Ethu Collegila	Gayathri's mother	
1996	Kaliveedu	Ramani	
1996	Kireedamillatha Rajakkanmar	Hostel warden	
1997	Asuravamsam	Jayamohan's mother	
1997	Snehasindooram	Nirmala	
1997	Karunyam	Indu's mother	
1997	Vamsam	Thommichan's wife	
1997	Nee Varuvolum	Revathy's mother	
1997	Manasam	Rajalakshmi's mother	
1997	Irattakuttikalude Achan	Anupama's mother	
1997	Adukkala Rahasyam Angaadippaattu	Indira Kaimal	
1998	Mayilpeelikkavu	Karthu	
1998	Manthri Kochamma	Padmavathi	
1998	Ennu Swantham Janakikutty	Janakikutty's mother	
1998	Oro Viliyum Kaathorthu	Karthyayani	
1998	Siddartha	Siddartha' mother	
1998	Ormacheppu	Jeevan's sister in law	
1999	Paava		
1999	Njangal Santhushtaranu	Women's Commission Member	
1999	Niram	Prakash's mother	
1999	Vazhunnor	Mary Chandni/Alice	
1999	Prempujari	Murali's mother	
1999	Ezhupunna Tharakan	Mathew's wife	
1999	Chandamama	Thresia	
1999	Sparsham	Mahesh's mother	

=== 2000s ===
Year	Title	Role	Notes
2000	Narasimham	Jayalakshmi teacher	
2000	Sahayathrikakku Snehapoorvam	Hostel warden	
2000	Varnakkaazhchakal	Subhadra	
2000	Vinayapoorvam Vidhyaadharan	Latha's mother	
2000	Mera Naam Joker	Vishalakshi	
2000	Swayamvara Panthal	Priya's mother	
2000	Life Is Beautiful	Anil's mother	
2000	Darling Darling	Padmaja's mother	
2000	Valliettan	Bava's wife	
2000	Daivathinte Makan	Soniya's mother	
2000	Cover Story	Advocate	
2000	Pilots	Cicily	
2001	Bhadra	Jayadevan's mother	
2001	Naranathu Thampuran	Sridevi's mother	
2001	Vakkalathu Narayanankutty	Kurien's wife	
2001	Praja	Minister Giirja	
2001	Bharthavudyogam	Sulochana	
2001	Nagaravadhu	Akkama Tharakan	
2001	Karumadikkuttan		
2001	Theerthadanam	Vinodhini's mother	
2002	Kanmashi	Anandavalli	
2002	Kunjikoonan		
2002	India Gate	Mrs. Viswanathan	
2002	Onnaman	Suhara's mother	
2002	Melvilasam Sariyanu	Anjali's mother	
2002	Pulival Kalyanam	Paramanandam's wife	
2002	Hariharan Pilla Happy Aanu	Ramani	
2004	Parayam		
2004	Mayilattam	Ponnamma	
2004	Swarna Medal	Jameela	
2004	Youth Festival	Arjun's mother	
2004	Kakkakarumban	Rameshan's stepmother	
2004	Kanninum Kannadikkum	Actress	
2004	Chathikkatha Chanthu	Vasumathi's relative	
2004	Freedom	Janaki	
2005	Deepangal Sakshi		
2005	Pauran	Dr. Ponnamma	
2005	Lokanathan IAS	Lokanathan's elder sister	
2005	Annorikkal	Myna's mother	
2005	Kochirajavu	Kunjamma	
2005	Athbhutha Dweepu	Arundhathi	
2005	Videsi Nair Swadesi Nair	Padmavathi	
2005	Ben Johnson	Madhavan Menon's wife	
2006	Yes Your Honour	Ravishankar's sister in law	
2006	Rashtram	MLA	
2006	Balram vs. Tharadas	Saleem's mother	
2006	Lion	Adv. Mercy Mathew	
2006	Thuruppugulan	Dance teacher	
2006	Kisan	Minister's PA	
2006	Pothan Vava	Antochan's wife	
2006	Baba Kalyani	Women's Commission member	
2007	Athishayan	Yunus Kunju's wife	
2007	Bharathan Effect	Karia's wife	
2007	Kaakki	Padmini	
2007	Changathipoocha		
2007	Panthaya Kozhi		
2007	Arputha Theevu	Arundhati	
2007	Nasrani	Guest	
2007	Nanma	Karuppakam	
2007	Black Cat	Susie's mother	
2007	Anamika	Rachel's mother	
2007	Inspector Garud	Women's Commission member, Malathy Varma	
2007	Detective	Reshmi's mother	
2008	Kabbadi Kabbadi	Panchayat President	
2008	Shakespeare M.A. Malayalam	Omana	
2008	Gopalapuranam	Kunjibeevi	
2008	Bullet	Gayathri's aunt	
2008	Aandavan	Prostitute	
2008	Twenty:20	Sobha	
2009	Black Dalia	Vivek's mother	
2009	Oru Black and White Kudumbam	Rahul's mother	

=== 2010s ===
Year	Title	Role	Notes
2010	Neelambari	Kannamma	
2010	Cheriya Kallanum Valiya Policum	Seelavathi	
2010	Pokkiri Raja	Mayor's wife	
2010	Advocate Lakshmanan - Ladies Only	Saramma	
2010	Marykkundoru Kunjaadu	Chantha Maria	
2011	Sarkar Colony	Colony resident	
2011	Teja Bhai & Family	Manikutty	
2011	Kottarathil Kutty Bhootham		
2011	Njaan Sanchaari		
2011	Kanakompathu	Hotel resident	
2011	Collector	Avinash's sister	
2011	Beautiful	Ammini	
2011	The Metro	Achayan's wife	
2011	Manushyamrugam	Lissy's mother	
2012	Vaadhyar	Teacher	
2012	Navagatharkku Swagatham	Actress	
2012	Padmasree Bharat Dr. Saroj Kumar	Neelima's friend	
2012	Doctor Innocentanu	Komalavalli	
2012	Mayamohini	Dr. Susamma Antony	
2012	Mr. Marumakan	Club member	
2012	Thanichalla Njan		
2012	Gruhanathan	Colony resident	
2012	Thappana	Annamma	
2012	Trivandrum Lodge	School principal	
2012	Naughty Professor	Karthika's mother	
2012	Run Baby Run	Benny's mother	
2012	Chettayees	Flat resident	
2012	Ajantha		
2012	101 Weddings	Bride	
2013	Honey Bee	Ferno's mother	
2013	Romans	Mathukutty's mother	
2013	Immanuel	Chandy's wife	
2013	Pullipulikalum Aattinkuttiyum	Soshamma	
2013	Sringara Velan	Aiswarya Rani	
2013	Hotel California	Susy's mother	
2013	Perunnal Nilavu	Roulath	
2013	Good Idea		
2013	Zachariayude Garbhinikal	Settu's wife	
2013	Pigman	Sister Maria	
2013	Kutteem Kolum	Kaimal's wife	
2013	Nadodimannan	Minister's wife	
2013	Malayala Nadu	Bharathi	
2013	Punyalan Agarbattis	Usha	
2014	Bad Boys		
2014	On the Way	Manju's mother	
2014	Nakshathrangal	Saraswathi	
2014	Kuruthamkettavan	Veroinca	
2014	Njannanu Party	Krishnakumar's mother	
2014	Salaam Kashmier	Lakshmi Kurup	
2014	Polytechnic	Health officer	
2014	Avatharam	Manimegha's aunt	
2014	Cousins	Poly's mother	
2015	3 Wikkattinu 365 Runs	Chandy's wife	
2015	Wonderful Jounrney		
2015	Uthara Chemmeen	Kochukkali	
2015	Aana Mayil Ottakam		
2015	Six	Nurse Mrinalini	
2015	Just Married	Shakeela's umma	
2015	Ivan Maryadaraman	Jayabharathi	
2015	Amar Akbar Anthony	Gouri's mother	
2016	Puthiya Niyamam	Anuradha	
2016	Anyarku Praveshanamilla	Mariya	
2016	Jalam	Secretary	
2016	Pa Va	Theyyamma	
2016	Popcorn	Janaki	
2016	Thodari	Srisha's mother	Tamil Movie
2017	Honey Bee 2: Celebrations	Ferno's mother	
2017	Achayans	Tony's mother	
2017	Punyalan Private Limited	Usha Thenginchodu	
2017	Basheerinte Premalekhanam	Teacher	
2017	Honey bee 2.5	Herself	
2017	Masterpiece	Sister Jacinta	
2018	Vikadakumaran		
2018	Naam	Molly John	
2018	Oru Pazhaya Bomb Kadha	Joseph's wife	
2018	Ennaalum Sarath..?	Sarath's mother	
2018	Laughing Apartment Near Girinagar	Thankam	
2018	Oru Kuttanadan Blog	Sharada	
2018	Chalakkudykkaran Changathy	Sharada	
2019	Poovalliyum Kunjadum	Achamma	
2019	Fancy Dress	Cicily	
2019	Mask	Mary	
2019	Old is Gold	Thaatha	
2019	Oru Yamandan Premakadha	College principal	
2019	Children's Park	Korah's wife	
2019	Brother's Day	Susanna George	
2019	Mr. Pavanayi 99.99	Eli	
2019	Edakkad Battalion 06	Shankaran's mother	
2019	Jack & Daniel	Padma Shenoy	

=== 2020s ===
Year	Title	Role	Notes
2020	Dhamaka	Valyammachi	
2021	Black Coffee	Sumi	
2021	Alice in Panchalinadu		
2023	Cheena Trophy	Lalitha	
2024	Oru Anweshanathinte Thudakkam	Alex's mother	
2024	Rifle Club	Shoshanna Punnoose	

== Television ==
Year	Title	Channel	Notes
2023-2024	Ammakkilikkoodu	Surya TV	as Bhanumati
2023	Mangalyam	Zee Keralam	as Padmavati (Guest appearance)
2023	Wife is Beautiful	Zee Keralam	as Padmavati (Guest appearance)
2021-2023	Mrs. Hitler	Zee Keralam	as Padmavathiyamma
2018-2019	Arayannangalude Veedu	FLOWERS TV	as Anna Ammachi
2016	Prekshakare Avashyamunde	Mazhavil Manorama	as Athidi
2014	Kochappy Tower Kottayam 18	Kaumudy TV	as Kochamma
2013	Nandhanam	Surya TV	
2011	Vallarpadathamma	Shalom (TV channel)	
2010	Veruthe Oru Bharthavu	ASIANET	
2009	Cinemala	ASIANET	
2008	Chilluvilakku	Surya TV	
2008	Priyamanasi	SURYA TV	
2007-2008	Sanmanassullavarkku Samadhanam	ASIANET	as Elikutty
2007	Manassariyathe	Surya TV	
2006	Ettu Sundarikalum Njanum	Surya TV	as Devaki
2005	Calling Bell	Surya TV	
2005	Santhanagopalam	Asianet	
2004	Kayamkulam Kochunni	Surya TV	as Keshu's wife
2004	Swantham	Asianet	
2004	Ladies Corner	Asianet	as Warden
2001	Valayam	DD Malayalam	
2000	Sreeraman Sreedevi	Asianet	
2000	Sthree	ASIANET	
1999	Samayam	Asianet	
1998	Iniyonnu Visramikkatte	DD Malayalam	
