= Tsunami (2021 film) =

2021 Indian film

- Theatrical release poster
- Directed by: Lal; Lal Jr.
- Written by: Lal
- Produced by: Alan Antony
- Starring: Balu Varghese; Innocent; Mukesh; Aju Varghese; Suresh Krishna; Aaradya Ann
- Cinematography: Alex J. Pulickal
- Edited by: Ratheesh Raj
- Music by: Yakzan Gary Pereira; Neha S.
- Production company: Panda Dad Production
- Distributed by: Panda Dad Release
- Release date: 11 March 2021
- Running time: 122 minutes
- Country: India
- Language: Malayalam

Tsunami is a 2021 Indian Malayalam-language romantic comedy film directed by Lal and Lal Jr. and written by Lal. The film stars Balu Varghese, Innocent, Mukesh, Suresh Krishna, Aju Varghese, and Aaradya Ann. The film follows Bobby, a young man who ends up in struggling situation with a women, which is followed by their marriage.

Tsunami was released on 11 March 2021 and was a box office failure.

== Plot ==
Bobby is a young man who goes to a seminary in Goa to become a priest, despite his family opposing it. But during his journey he ends up going to the bathroom while the bus stops for a break and by chance happen to enter a ladies toilet. Anna, a girl comes and opens the door when he had taken off his pants leaving the girl and Bobby both scared. Her relatives take her from there seeing her scared and shouting while her mother returns to the bathroom to see Bobby hiding his face and running from there. She pursue him to beat him up but he outrun her. Feeling sad, he ends up not going to seminary and return home. Bobby decided to marry Anna. Then the family decides to get him married according to their wishes. But the effect of the events of that journey do not leave him and he ends up in trouble after marriage.

== Cast ==
- Balu Varghese as Bobby Francis
- Aradhya Ann as Anna
- Innocent as Eapachan, Franicis's father
- Mukesh as Fr. Sylvester (Achankochapi), Bobby's uncle
- Suresh Krishna as Francis, Bobby's Father
- Nisha Joseph as Jacintha Eapen, Anna's mother
- Devi Ajith as Jolly Francis, Bobby's Mother
- Sminu Sijo as Molly
- Aju Varghese as Antony a.k.a. Andy, Bobby's cousin
- Shilpa Tulasi as Judy, Andy's Wife
- Valsala Menon as Grandmother
- Sinoj Varghese as Vasu
- Arun Cherukavil as CI Bernard, Anna's Uncle
- Surjith Gopinath

== Reception ==
The Times of India gave it a rating of 3 out of 5 stars. Samayam Malayalam gave 2.5 out of 5 stars. Dool News gave it negative reviews for its plot and adult humour.
