= Balu Varghese =

Indian film actor (born 1991)

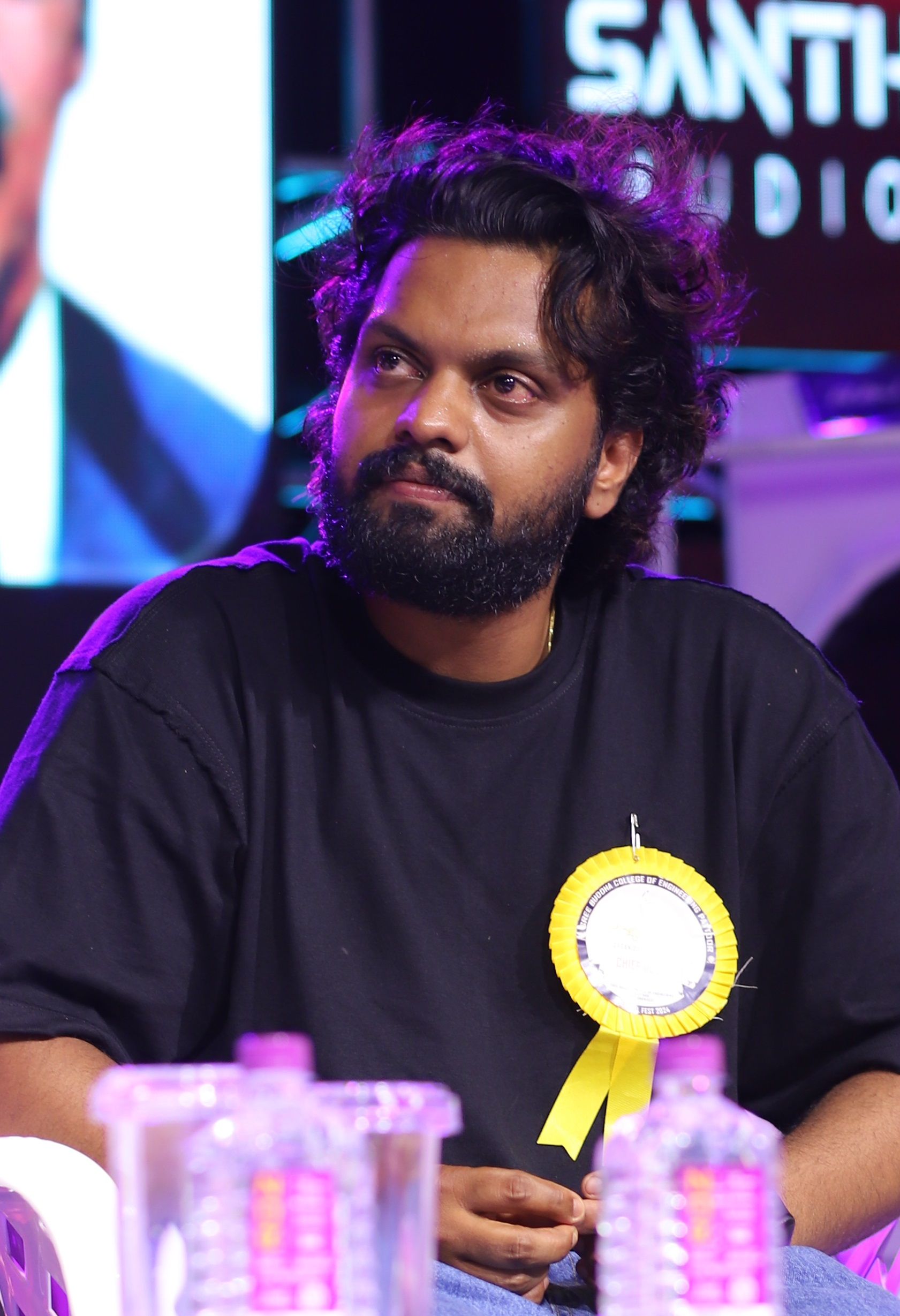
- Balu Varghese in 2024
- Born: 26 October 1991 (age 35); Kochi, Kerala, India
- Occupation: Actor
- Years active: 2005–present
- Spouse: Aileena Catherin (m. 2020)
- Relatives: Lal (uncle); Alex Paul (uncle); Lal Jr. (cousin)

Balu Varghese is an Indian actor and singer who predominantly works in the Malayalam film industry. He began his acting career as a child actor in Chanthupottu (2005).

== Early life and career ==
Balu Varghese was born in Kochi. He is the son of E. J. Varghese and Neena Varghese. He is also the nephew of Malayalam actor Lal and music director Alex Paul. He made his acting debut in 2005, by playing a child artist in Chanthupottu. He later starred in Lal Jr.’s directorial debut film Honey Bee.

== Personal life ==
He married Aileena Catherin Amon on 2 February 2020. They have a son named Ezekiel Amy Varghese, who was born on March 31, 2021

== Filmography ==
Key
| † | Denotes films that have not yet been released |

- All films are in Malayalam language unless otherwise noted.

| Year | Title | Role | Notes | Ref. |
|---|---|---|---|---|
| 2005 | Chanthupottu | Younger Kumaran | Child artist | |
| 2006 | Oruvan | Young Shivan | Child artist | |
| 2007 | Arabikkatha | Young Cuba Mukundan | Child artist | |
| 2008 | Thalappavu | Young S. Raveendran Pillai | Child artist | |
| 2010 | Kanmazha Peyyum Munpe | Ijas | Child artist | |
| 2010 | Paappi Appacha | Vijeesh | Child artist | |
| 2011 | Manikiakkallu | Basheer | Child artist | |
| 2011 | Arjunan Saakshi | Selvam | | |
| 2012 | Cobra | Young Kari | | |
| 2013 | Maad Dad | Young Eesho | | |
| 2013 | Honey Bee | Ambrose Perera | | |
| 2013 | Bicycle Thieves | | Cameo appearance | |
| 2014 | Happy Journey | Freddy | | |
| 2014 | Hi I'm Tony | Sameer | | |
| 2014 | Ithihasa | Vikki | | |
| 2014 | Money Ratnam | Joppa's son | | |
| 2015 | Namasthe Bali | Freakan Fakrudeen | | |
| 2015 | Onnam Loka Mahayudham | Bijesh | | |
| 2015 | Oru Second Class Yathra | Kumar | | |
| 2015 | Aana Mayil Ottakam | Ram | Lead role | |
| 2015 | Appavum Veenjum | Jithu | | |
| 2016 | Style | Prayagan a.k.a. Di Caprio | | |
| 2016 | King Liar | Antappan | | |
| 2016 | Darvinte Parinamam | Ravi | | |
| 2016 | Inspector Dawood Ibrahim | | Cameo appearance | |
| 2016 | Marubhoomiyile Aana | Martin | | |
| 2016 | Kavi Uddheshichathu..? | Karal | | |
| 2017 | Honey Bee 2 | Ambrose Perera | | |
| 2017 | Ezra | | | |
| 2017 | Sarvopari Palakkaran | Joymon | | |
| 2017 | Honey Bee 2.5 | Himself | | |
| 2017 | Chunkz | Romario | Lead role | |
| 2017 | Tharangam | Joy C | | |
| 2018 | Vallikkudilile Vellakkaran | Tom Joseph | | |
| 2018 | Premasoothram | Prakashan | Lead role | |
| 2018 | Ladoo | Rahul | | |
| 2019 | Vijay Superum Pournamiyum | Roshan | Also playback singer | |
| 2019 | Oru Kuprasidha Payyan | Jinesh | | |
| 2019 | Muhabathin Kunjabdulla | | | |
| 2019 | Janamaithri | Jack Daniels | | |
| 2019 | Under World | Frog catcher | Cameo Role | |
| 2019 | Happy Sardar | Iqbaal Moos | | |
| 2019 | Puzhikkadakan | Sebastian / Seban | | |
| 2021 | Operation Java | Anthony | Lead Role | |
| 2021 | Tsunami | Boby Francis | Lead Role; also playback singer | |
| 2021 | Ellam Sheriyakum | Sakhavu Nivin George | | |
| 2021 | Jan.E.Man | Monichchan | Lead Role | |
| 2021 | Sumesh and Ramesh | Ramesh | Lead Role | |
| 2022 | Vichithram | Joyner | | |
| 2023 | Charles Enterprises | Ravi | | |
| 2023 | Maharani | Renny | | |
| 2024 | Manjummel Boys | Sixon John | | |
| 2024 | Nadikar | Lenin | | |
| 2024 | Pallotty 90's Kids | Kannan | | |
| 2024 | Pushpaka Vimanam | | | |
| 2025 | Ennu Swantham Punyalan | Fr. Thomas | | |
| 2025 | Sumathi Valavu | Ambadi | | |
| 2025 | Lokah Chapter 1: Chandra | | Cameo appearance | |
| 2025 | Bha Bha Ba | Mahi | | |
| 2026 | Melcow Pondicherry | | | |
| TBA | 1 Princess Street † | TBA | | |
| TBA | Alankam † | TBA | | |
| TBA | Al Karama † | TBA | | |
| TBA | Operation Cambodia † | TBA | | |
