= Jean Paul Lal =

Indian film director

Lal Jr.
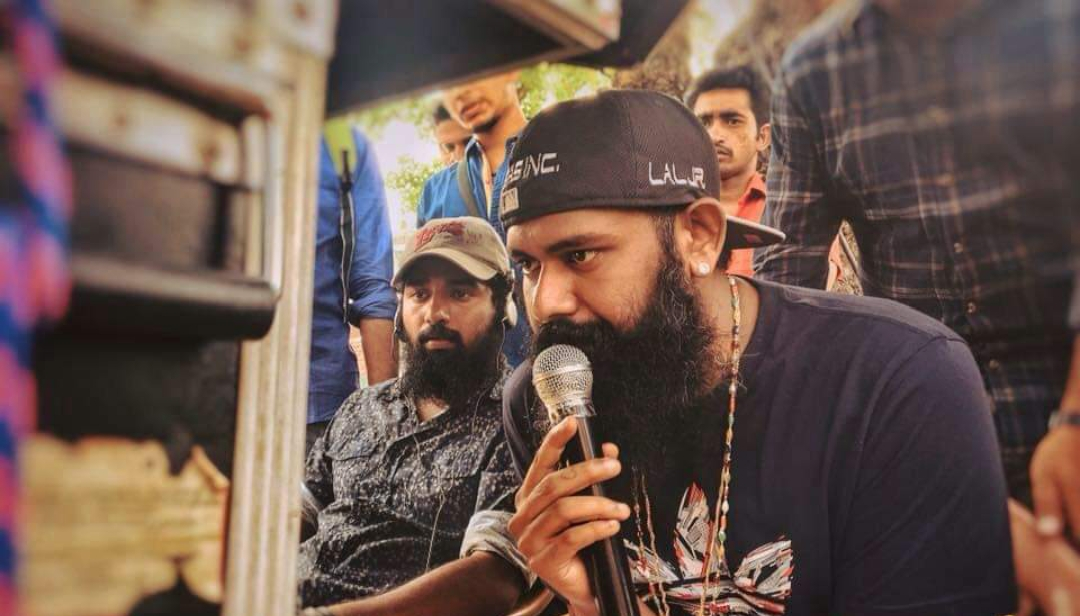
- Born: Jean Paul Lal; 2 June 1988 (age 38); Kochi, Kerala, India
- Education: New York Film Academy
- Occupations: Director; actor
- Years active: 2013–present
- Spouse: Blessy Jean (m. 2013; div. 2021)
- Parent(s): Lal (father); Nancy Lal (mother)
- Relatives: Balu Varghese (cousin)

Jean Paul Lal is an Indian film director and actor who mainly works in the Malayalam film industry. He is the son of actor-director Lal. His directorial debut movie was Honey Bee starring Asif Ali which was a hit. He also played his acting debut as Solomon main villain in the movie Under World. He played a significant role in 2023 Priyadarshan movie Corona Papers.

== Personal life ==
Jean Paul Lal was born to Lal and Nancy on 2 June 1988. He has a younger sister, Monica Lal, who completed her post-graduation studies in London. He studied filmmaking at the New York Film Academy. Jean Paul Lal married Blessy Susan Varghese on 26 December 2013 and they have a son. The couple divorced in 2021.

== Filmography ==
Key
†	Denotes films that have not yet been released

=== As director ===
Year	Film	Notes
2013	Debt	short film
2013	Honey Bee	
2014	Hi I'm Tony	
2014	Vekkada Vedi	short film
2017	Honey Bee 2: Celebrations	
2019	Driving License	
2021	Tsunami	
2024	Nadikar	

=== As actor ===
Year	Title	Role	Notes	Ref.
2012	Cobra	Archery	cameo in end credits, assistant to Lal	
2017	Honey Bee 2.5	Himself		
2019	Under World	Solomon		
2023	Corona Papers	Tony		
2024	Manjummel Boys	Siju		
2026	Karakkam	Jackson		
2026	Balan: The Boy	CPO/SI Pavithran K. S.		
2026	Sardar 2	Airah "Aala", Yogi’s brother.	Tamil Film	
