= Cobra (2012 film) =

2012 film directed by Lal

- Theatrical release poster
- Directed by: Lal
- Written by: Lal
- Produced by: Anto Joseph
- Starring: Mammootty; Lal
- Cinematography: Venu
- Edited by: V Saajan
- Music by: Alex Paul
- Production company: Emperor Cinemas
- Distributed by: Play House Release
- Release date: 12 April 2012 (India)
- Country: India
- Language: Malayalam

Cobra is a 2012 Indian Malayalam-language action black comedy film written and directed by Lal, starring Mammootty and himself in the lead roles. The songs were composed by Alex Paul, and background score by Deepak Dev.

== Plot ==
The film tells the story of two rich non-identical twin brothers Raja and Kari, who lives like friends. Both the brothers are a Delhi-based famous boxers who are nicknamed as Cobras (short form of co-brothers alias Kottayam Brothers). The two begin to seek brides to marry. Their marriages get fixed. But on the day of the marriages, one of the brides is late for the ceremony. Thinking that she has eloped, Raja cancels the marriage and they moves to Coimbatore.

They meet John Samuel, another freestyle Boxing champion who is looking for prospective buyers for his house. He needs money for the education of his daughters Sherly and Annie, who are doing their medical studies in Bangalore. While the Cobras are negotiating the deal, they see a picture of the two girls and they plan to marry them. Samuel wants to hide the news of selling the house from his daughters; he asks the Cobras to hide the news for another 6 months until their studies are over. The Cobras say that they will delay the registration until the 6 months have passed, and during that period they will stay at Samuel's house as tenants.

Meanwhile, Isaac and his brother Albert are trying to forcefully take Samuel's house and his hospital. Isaac tries to humiliate the Cobras on the day of the inauguration of his hospital. Samuel and Isaac get into a verbal fight and set a boxing match the next weekend with a deal that whoever wins will get the hospital. Isaac finds out that Raja has a twin brother named Shivadas Naidu, a Malaysian-based gangster. Isaac blackmails Raja saying that if he does not forfeit, he will bring Shivadas to Kari. Raja thinks that it will break Kari's heart, so he decides to back out from the fight. However, Kari and Samuel decide to carry on with the match.

Raja joins them. Even during the match Isaac tries to blackmail Raja showing him Shivadas standing near the venue. Initially, Raja does not fight back and gets badly beaten. Then Kari comes into the ring and beats Albert and he also gets badly beaten by Isaac. Seeing Kari getting beaten up, Samuel tells him to accept the defeat, but Kari refuses and tells that if he fails then Raja will also fail and he won't allow for it. On hearing this, Raja fights back and defeats Isaac, thus winning the match. Meanwhile, seeing the love between Raja and Kari, Shivadas leaves the scene without anyone noticing.

== Cast ==
- Mammootty in a dual role as:
  - Rajavembala (Raja) / King Cobra, a professional boxer
    - Musthafa as Young Raja
  - Sivadas Naidu, a Malaysian based gangster
- Lal as Karimoorkhan (Kari) / Black Cobra
  - Balu Varghese as young Kari
- Lalu Alex as John Samuel
- Babu Antony as Isaac
- Jagathy Sreekumar as Judgepaappan, Isaac's grandfather
- Salim Kumar as Gopalan
- Maniyanpilla Raju as Bralan (Balan)
- Padmapriya as Sherly
- Kaniha as Annie
- Ranjith Velayudhan as Albert
- Ramu as Raja's uncle
- Siddique as Alphonse
- Vijay Menon as Referee
- Sreejith Ravi as Gracy's husband
- Kalabhavan Navas as Rosy's husband
- Radhika as Rosy
- Leena Maria Paul as Gracy
- Indrans as Tea seller
- Pradeep Kottayam as Audience member
- Lal Jr. (cameo appearance)

== Production ==
The movie was shot at Ernakulam, Chalakudy, Trivandrum and Bangkok, Thailand.

== Music ==
The soundtrack album of the film was composed by Alex Paul and lyrics penned by Santhosh Varma.

Track #	Song	Artist(s)
1	"Ente Nenjinullile"	Lal, Kalabhavan Navas
2	"Vallathe Aashapettu"	Shyam Prasad, Kalpana
3	"Ettadiveerane"	Pradeep Babu, Alex Paul
4	"Pattu Pattu"	Vidhu Prathap, Rimy Tomy

== Reception ==
Sify.com's Moviebuzz rated the movie "average", saying it is "a botched up version of the conventional recipes".

Rediff.com rated the film two out of five stars, saying that "Cobra offers nothing much to the discerning viewer and just cashes in on the actors' star image".
