= Sminu Sijo =

Indian actress

- Born: 31 May 1979 (age 46); Kottayam, Kerala
- Occupation: Actress
- Years active: 2018–present
- Spouse: Sijo Ayyarukulangara

Sminu Sijo is an Indian actress who predominantly works in Malayalam films. She is noted for her performances in Rahel Makan Kora, Jo and Jo and Sundari Gardens.

== Filmography ==
Year	Title	Role	Notes
2016	School Bus		
2018	Njan Prakashan	Goplaji's wife	
2019	Kettyolaanu Ente Malakha	Anna	
2021	Operation Java	Antony's mother	
2021	Yuvam	Nurse	
2021	The Priest	Sheela	
2021	Tsunami	Molly	
2021	Nayattu	Maniyan's wife	
2021	Bhramam	Martha	
2022	Member Rameshan 9aam Ward	Rameshan's Mother	
2022	CBI 5: The Brain	Muthokkoya's sister	
2022	Jo and Jo	Lilly	
2022	Prakashan Parakkatte	Lalitha	
2022	Heaven	CPO Binimol	
2022	Priyan Ottathilanu	Vanitha	
2022	Sundari Gardens	Annamachi	
2022	1744 White Alto	Mahesh's mother	
2022	Shefeekkinte Santhosham	Safeera	
2022	Louis		
2022	Saudi Vellakka	Sminu	
2023	Theru	Janaki	
2023	Khali Purse of Billionaires	Vijay's mother	
2023	Janaki Jaane	Satyabhama	
2023	Neeraja	Neeraja's mother	
2023	Voice of Sathyanathan	Thresyakkutty	
2023	Vaathil		
2023	Rahel Makan Kora	Rahel	
2023	Sesham Mikeil Fathima	Beena	
2023	Maharani	Radhamani	
2024	Vivekanandan Viralanu	CPO Mercy Mathew	
2024	Thundu	Principal Dayana Jacob	
2024	Idiyan Chandhu	Manju	
2024	Memory Plus		
2024	Nadikar	Bala's mother	
2024	Vaazha – Biopic of a Billion Boys	Vishnu's mother	
2024	Gumasthan	Leela	
2024	Norris Oshana	John's mother	
2024	Oru Anweshanathinte Thudakkam	Judge	
2025	Sumathi Valavu	Shobha	
2025	Padakkuthira		
2025	Pongala		
