= Oruvan (2006 film) =

2006 film

- Directed by: Vinu Anand
- Written by: Reji Nair
- Screenplay by: Reji Nair
- Produced by: Ajith Varma; PK Sasheendra Varma
- Starring: Indrajith Sukumaran; Prithviraj Sukumaran; Meera Vasudev
- Cinematography: Jibu Jacob
- Edited by: Ranjan Abraham
- Music by: Ouseppachan
- Distributed by: Varma Film Corporation
- Release date: 8 December 2006
- Country: India
- Language: Malayalam

Oruvan is a 2006 Indian Malayalam-language film directed by Vinu Anand (in his directorial debut). The film stars Indrajith Sukumaran in the lead role alongside Prithviraj Sukumaran, Meera Vasudev, Lal and Salim Kumar plays supporting roles.

== Cast ==
- Indrajith Sukumaran as Shivan
  - Balu Varghese as Young Shivan
- Prithviraj Sukumaran as SI Jeevan
- Lal as Bharathan Aashan
- Souparnika Subhash as Geethu
- Meera Vasudev as Jaya
- Salim Kumar as Balan
- Mala Aravindan as Velayudhan
- Shamna Kasim as Devutty
- Shaalin Zoya as Remya mol
- Anoop Chandran as Ravi
- V. K. Sreeraman as Marakkar
- T. G. Ravi as Vilaganoor Aashan
- Gayathri as Jaanu
- Sreehari as Chandran
- Unnimaya as Meenukutty
- Anand as CI Madhavan
- Subair as Psychiatrist Stephen Koshy
- Sreejith Ravi- Cameo Appearance
- Tosh Christy - Cameo Appearance
- Sajeed Puthalath - Cameo Appearance
- Geetha Salam
- Ambika Mohan

== Production ==
The film was shot in Palghat.

== Reception ==
A critic from Nowrunning wrote that "director Vinu Anand and his team must be appreciated for having ventured to make a rather different kind of a movie with a very striking end, and that too in a fairly good manner for a maiden venture".
