= Pothan Vava =

- Directed by: Joshiy
- Written by: Benny P Nayarambalam
- Produced by: Lal
- Starring: Mammootty; Usha Uthup
- Cinematography: Sanjeev Sankar
- Edited by: Ranjan Abraham
- Music by: Alex Paul
- Release date: 21 October 2006
- Running time: 140 minutes
- Country: India
- Language: Malayalam

Pothan Vava is a 2006 Malayalam language action comedy film directed by Joshiy, starring Mammootty and Usha Uthup. Through this film, the famous Indian pop and Bollywood singer Usha Uthup made her first screen appearance, in which she played the role of the protagonist's mother. The film was released on October 21 coinciding with Diwali. Pothen Vava was credited for an excellent performance and commercial success.

== Plot ==
Vava, a villager, goes through many troubles as he is born to a Christian mother and a Brahmin father. However, he is determined to prove to society that love is what matters the most.

== Cast ==
- Mammootty as Kurisuveettil Pothan Vava
- Usha Uthup as Kurisuveettil Mariamma
- Nedumudi Venu as Meppattor Vishnu Narayanan Nampoothiri
- Gopika as Advocate Gladys (Voice-over by Sreeja Ravi)
- Bijukuttan as Mathai
- Rajan P. Dev as Vakkachan
- Spadikam George as Antochan
- Maniyanpilla Raju as Paulachan
- Sai Kumar as Sivankutty
- Samvrutha Sunil as Gayathri
- Kalasala Babu as Fr. Abraham
- Biju Pappan as Britto
- Augustine as Kurian
- Kunchan as Panikkar
- Baburaj as Michael
- Ponnamma Babu as Antochan's wife
- Nisha Sarang as Paulachan's wife
- Deepika Mohan
- Narayanankutty
- Lal as himself (Guest Appearance)

== Music ==
The score and soundtrack of the movie was composed by Alex Paul, with lyrics written by Vayalar Sarath Chandra Varma.

1. "Vave Makane" - Madhu Balakrishnan, Usha Uthup
2. "Vave Makane" - Afsal, Madhu Balakrishnan, Pradeep Palluruthy, Ramesh Babu
3. "Nerane Ellam Nerane" - Madhu Balakrishnan, Reju Joseph, Manjari
4. "Omkarathidambulla" - M. G. Sreekumar
5. "Manjadi Manimuth" - M. G. Sreekumar, Jyotsna
6. "Raga" (Bit) - Jyotsna, Chorus

== Box office ==
The film was a commercial success at the box office.
