= Suresh Krishna (actor) =

Film Actor from Kerala, India

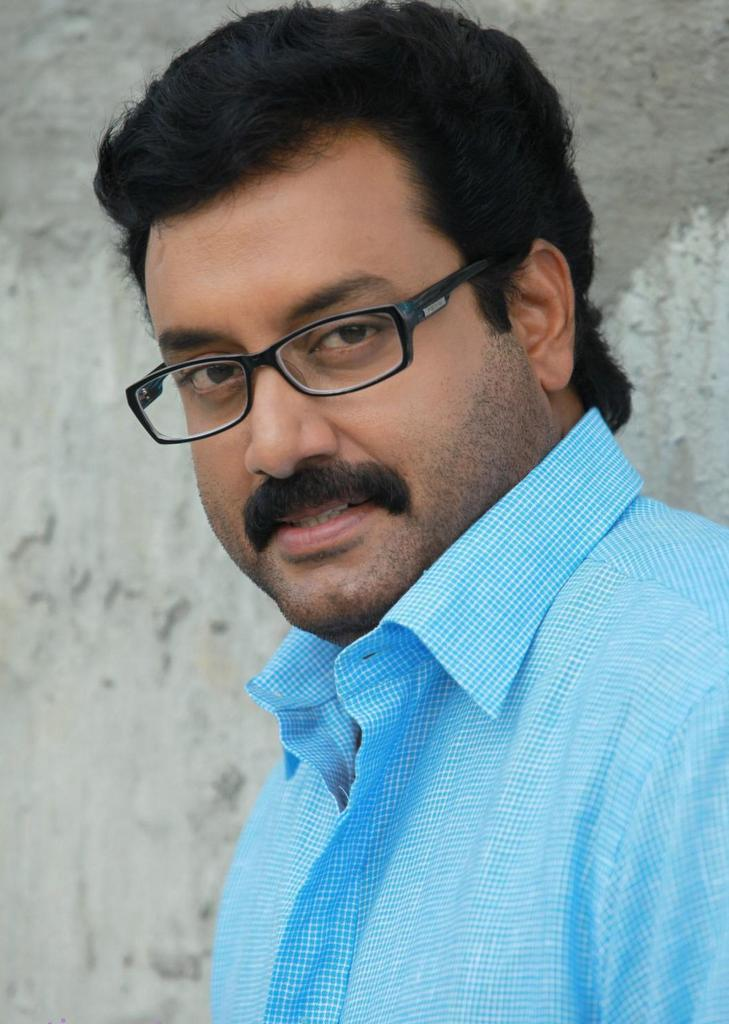
- Born: Suresh Kumar; April 5 Guruvayoor, Kerala, India
- Occupation: Actor
- Years active: 1993–present
- Spouse: Dr. Sree Lakshmi (m. 2006)
- Children: 2
- Parent(s): Balakrishna Panicker; Parvathy

Suresh Krishna (born 5 April) is an Indian actor who predominantly works in the Malayalam film industry, known for his various roles as supporting actor in earlier negative performances and character roles. He is noted for his performances in Christian Brothers, Praja, Manju Poloru Penkutti, Pazhassi Raja, Bethlehem Kudumba Unit and Kutty Srank.

== Personal life ==
Suresh Krishna was born on 5 April, the youngest of six children, to Balakrishna Panicker and Parvathy in the temple town of Guruvayoor in Thrissur district. His father was working with the Tamil Nadu Government in the irrigation department and the family migrated to Tamil Nadu. Suresh was educated in Chennai.

He is married to Dr. Sree Lakshmi, a professor, in Kochi with two children. Currently he resides at Thrippunithura with his family.

== Career ==
Suresh's first acting role was in a Tamil serial in Doordarshan, produced by Madhumohan in 1990. In 1995, Suresh's played the legendary Thiruvalluvar, earning him instant recognition across Tamil Nadu. He was working in Tamil films and television from Chennai when he was offered a chance to debut in Malayalam, acting in the serial Sthree Janmam. His next role was as Balashankar in K. K. Rajeev's Swapnam. His performance as the lovelorn husband fetched him numerous awards including the Asianet Cine Award for The Best Actor. He then played Surya, in Orma, which was aired on Asianet and went on to become one of his best works on the small screen.

=== Film career ===
In 1993, Suresh made his debut on the Malayalam big screen in Chamayam. Since then he has acted in a slew of Malayalam films with major directors and stars, including; Kamal (in Manju poloru Penkutty and Rapakkal ); Santhosh Sivan (in Ananthabhadram), Ranjith ( in Paleri Manikyam, Kerala Cafe and Indian Rupee), Joshiy (Christian Brothers ), Shaji N. Karun (in Kutty Srank ) and Hariharan in his film PazhassiRaja.

The character roles of "Kaitheri Ambu" from Pazhassi Raja and "Loni Aasan" from Kutty Srank were milestones in his career. His performance as Loni Asaan won him a Film Fare nomination for the Best Actor in a Supporting Role. Besides his roles as a supporting actor, he is noted for his strong negative characters starting with the villain "Shekarankutty" from Karumadikuttan, the lecherous stepfather "Mohan" from Manju Poloru Penkutti, the cruel "Kishanchand" from Banaras, the don "Paruthikkadan Shaji" from The Metro, the villainous "Manikunju" from Pappi Appacha and the scheming GeorgeKutty from Christian Brothers.

2014 saw him work with director Renjith in Njan in a role that showcased his abilities as an actor.

In 2024, he found sudden new popularity on social media, following a wave of memes highlighting the nature of deceit and manipulation done by the characters he had portrayed, branding him the title 'Convincing star'.

=== Producer ===
Suresh has also become a producer through Thakkali Films, along with actor Biju Menon, director Shajoon Kariyal, scriptwriter Sachi and cinematographer P. Sukumar. Their first release Chettayees starring Lal, Biju Menon, Suresh Krishna, P. Sukumar, Sunil Babu and Miya was released in November 2012. The movie marked a further exploration of his skills from villain style roles to comedy.

== Filmography ==
=== Films ===
Key
†	Denotes films that have not yet been released

- All films are in Malayalam language unless otherwise noted.

Year	Title	Role	Notes
1993	Chamayam		Uncredited Role
1996	Yuvathurki		Uncredited Role
2000	Pottu Amman	Prathmipadhi	Tamil debut
2001	Karumadikkuttan	Shekharan	Debut Film
2001	Rakshasa Rajavu	Mohammed Ibrahim	
2001	Praja	Unni Pisharodi	
2002	Kuberan	Sanjay	
2002	Chathurangam	Kozhuvanal Jose	
2002	Ee Bhargavi Nilayam		
2002	Onnaman	Ramanik	
2003	Pattanathil Sundaran	Sasidharan	
2003	War and Love	Major Rajendran	
2004	Vajram	Raghu	
2004	Manju Poloru Penkutty	Mohan	
2004	Sathyam	Mambilly Prakash Menon	
2005	Rappakal	Sudhi	
2005	Rajamanikyam	Ramesh	
2005	Maanikyan	Rajendran	
2005	Anandabhadram	Police Inspector	
2006	Rashtram	Mukundan	
2006	Thuruppu Gulan	Unnithan's Son	
2006	Chess	Adv. Raj Mohan	
2006	Yes Your Honour	A.C.P. Prakash	
2007	Flash	Bhadran	
2007	Sooryan	Cherian	
2007	Nadiya Kollappetta Rathri	Vijayabhanu	
2007	Paradesi	Ravi Tharakan	
2008	Thirakkatha	Doctor Shahid	
2008	Kanichukulangarayil CBI	James George	
2009	Ivar Vivahitharayal	Manager of MIF Group	Special Appearance
2009	Banaras	Kishanchand	
2009	Chemistry	Father Vattaparambil	
2009	T. D. Dasan Std. VI B	Ramankutty	
2009	Ee Pattanathil Bhootham	Robins	
2009	Kerala Cafe		In the Segment Nostalgia
2009	Kerala Varma Pazhassi Raja	Kaitheri Ambu	
2009	Paleri Manikyam: Oru Pathirakolapathakathinte Katha	D.Y.S.P. Madhavan	
2010	Thanthonni	Nelson	
2010	Kutty Srank	Loni Ashan	
2010	Again Kasargod Khader Bhai	Ameer Ajmal	
2010	Pramani	Mangattu Vikraman	
2010	Paappi Appacha	Manikunju	
2010	Kaaryasthan	Susheelan	
2011	The Metro	Paruthikkadan Shaji	
2011	Sahasram	Sudheer	
2011	Arjunan Saakshi	Salim Mamen	
2011	Christian Brothers	George Kutty	
2011	Venicile Vyapari	Chungathara Aniyappan	
2011	Mohabbath		
2011	Manikiakkallu		
2011	Indian Rupee	Chandrashekar Menon	
2012	Father's Day		
2012	Shikari	Abdulla	
2012	Kalikaalam	Gouthaman Nair	
2012	Mallu Singh	Ananthan	
2012	Ulakam Chuttum Valiban	Dhathan	
2012	Naughty Professor		
2012	Thappana	Chettiyar Sivan	
2012	Chettayees	Roopesh Krishna	
2013	Entry	Police Commissioner	
2013	Climax	Ramkumar(R.K.)	
2013	Ezhamathe Varavu	Forest Ranger	
2013	Ginger	Harinarayanan	
2013	Honey Bee	Father Collins	
2013	Kadal Kadannu Oru Mathukkutty	Soman and himself	Dual Role
2013	Memories	Vinod Krishna	
2014	Njaan	Achan	
2014	Praise the Lord	C.I. Balakrishnan	
2014	Villali Veeran	Gautaman Viswanathan	
2015	Loham	Shaji Bhaskar	
2015	Anarkali	Aatta Koya	
2016	Valleem Thetti Pulleem Thetti	Menon a.k.a. Bhagavaan	
2016	Thoppil Joppan	Roy	
2016	Swarna Kaduva	Divakaran	
2016	Leela	Devassi	
2017	Puthan Panam	Manager Ramana	
2017	Honey Bee 2: Celebrations	Father Collin's	
2017	Munthirivallikal Thalirkkumbol	Augustine	
2017	Sherlock Toms	Pradeep	
2017	Ramaleela	Theekuni Chandran	
2018	Uncle	Vishwan	
2018	Orayiram Kinakkalal	Abraham Mathan	
2018	Drama	Philip John Chako (Monichan)	
2018	Aanakkallan	C.I. Bruselee Rajan	
2018	Padayottam	Baba	
2019	Ganagandharvan	Shyamaprasad	
2019	Mamangam	Pokkar	
2019	Jack & Daniel	Jerald Mathew	
2019	Driving Licence	Actor Bhadran	
2019	Nalpathiyonnu (41)	Ravi Nambiar	
2021	One	M.L.A. Nilamel Rajan	
2021	Tsunami	Fransis	
2021	Marakkar: Arabikadalinte Simham	Moidu	
2022	Kotthu	Ninan Punnose	
2022	Pathonpatham Noottandu	Panikkasseri Parameswara Kaimal	
2022	Varaal	Gafoor Rowther	
2023	Vellari Pattanam	Alex Vettukala	
2023	Thrishanku	Biju	
2024	Nadikar	Paily Chettan aka PK	
2024	Super Zindagi	Da Vinci	
2024	Rifle Club	Dr. Lazar	
2025	Besty	Jabbar	
2025	Maranamass	Jithin Kumar/Jikku	
2025	Flask	Judge Venkatesh Balaji	
2025	Raveendra Nee Evide?		
2025	Odum Kuthira Chaadum Kuthira	Nidhi's father	
2025	Haal		
2026	Masthishka Maranam	Charlie	
2026	Bethlehem Kudumba Unit	Baiju Xavier	
2026	Law and Order	Divakaran	
2026	Titans	CI Vyasan	

=== Web series ===
Year	Title	Role	Notes
2024	Jai Mahendran	Aravindan	

== Awards and nominations ==
Nominations

- 2011 -Filmfare Awards South- Best Supporting Actor (Kutty Srank)

== Television serials ==
year	Title	Channel	Language	Notes
1998	Madhu Mohan's Serial	DD Chennai	Tamil	
1999	Thiruvalluvar	DD Podhigai	Tamil	
1998-2000	Sthree	Asianet	Malayalam	
2002	Sarada	Asianet	Malayalam	
2002	Abhayam	Surya TV	Malayalam	
2003	Swapnam	Asianet	Malayalam	Asian Paints Apex Ultima Asianet Family TV Awards 2005 for The best son-in-law role
2004	Megham	Asianet	Malayalam	
2004	Dambathya geethangal	Asianet	Malayalam	
2005	Kudipaka	Asianet	Malayalam	
2005-2006	Orma	Asianet	Malayalam	
2006	Minnaram	Asianet	Malayalam	
2006	Lakshyam	Asianet	Malayalam	
2007	Daya	Kairali TV	Malayalam	
2007	Thulabharam	Surya TV	Malayalam	
