= Anwar (2010 film) =

- Theatrical release poster
- Directed by: Amal Neerad
- Written by: Amal Neerad; Unni R. (dialogues)
- Produced by: Raj Zacharias; Rijo Zacharias
- Starring: Prithviraj Sukumaran; Prakash Raj; Mamtha Mohandas; Lal; Nithya Menen; Sampath Raj
- Narrated by: Mammootty
- Cinematography: Satheesh Kurup
- Edited by: Vivek Harshan
- Music by: Gopi Sundar
- Distributed by: Red Carpet Movies Limited
- Release date: 15 October 2010
- Running time: 134 minutes
- Country: India
- Language: Malayalam
- Budget: ₹4 crore

Anwar is a 2010 Indian Malayalam-language action thriller film written and directed by Amal Neerad. The film stars Prithviraj Sukumaran in the title role, alongside Prakash Raj, Mamtha Mohandas, Nithya Menen, Lal, and Sampath Raj in supporting roles. The music was composed by Gopi Sundar with cinematography by Satheesh Kurup and editing by Vivek Harshan. The film was released on 15 October 2010.

== Plot ==
The plot revolves around the 1998 Coimbatore bomb blast, where a special team under officer Stalin Manimaran arrests Babu Mather alias Babu Sait, a local community leader, as a suspect in the bomb blast case. One year later, Anwar, a Malayali/Tamil youth, is arrested while carrying hawala money and is sent to prison with Babu Sait and his team. Anwar is fascinated by Babu Sait's terrorist activities. Babu Sait helps Anwar get bail and involves him in his activities. Anwar successfully terminates two local drug dealers and becomes Babu Sait's most trusted and obedient right-hand man. He succeeds in planting a bomb in the police headquarters and is soon introduced to Basheer Bhai and his man Rana, who selects him to spearhead another dangerous project of chain blasts in Mumbai. Although Anwar follows through with their plans, Babu Sait shows pictures of the Coimbatore blast, which diverts Anwar to his past.

Past: Anwar is an NRI who returns from USA for his sister Asna's wedding in a rural area of Palakkad, where he meets and falls for Asna's best friend Ayesha, who later accepts his proposal. While Anwar and his family are shopping in Coimbatore, a sudden blast kills his whole family, leaving Anwar as the sole survivor, but Ayesha is later arrested for the blast. Anwar requests Stalin for her bail, but the latter refuses due to lack of evidence. Later, Anwar helps Stalin discover the terrorists and their nefarious activities and joins Babu Sait's gang to learn about their next attack.

Present: Anwar reveals to Stalin, in their secret meeting, that Babu Sait planned the bomb blasts, and Stalin also brings Ayesha so they can meet after a long time. When Babu Sait's men arrive, Stalin tells Anwar to act as if they were fighting, and one of Babu Sait's men shoots Stalin, thereby killing him, thinking that Anwar was fighting. Anwar is given the responsibility of transporting the deadly terrorists to Mumbai through a ship full of explosives and weapons. At first, Anwar makes them think that he is on their side, but he soon blasts the ship and kills all the terrorists. Anwar reveals his true face to Babu Sait and kills Basheer and Rana. Babu Sait becomes furious that Anwar cheated them.

Anwar reveals that his parents and many innocent people, who were true believers, got killed in the bomb blast planned by Babu Sait, and Anwar was the weapon used against him. Anwar tells that nobody will forgive Babu Sait's treachery. Defeated, Babu Sait commits suicide by shooting himself. Anwar calls Stalin's phone, which is under police custody, and tells them that the mission is accomplished. Stalin and his colleague receive bravery awards, but no one recognizes the near-death battle Anwar fought. Anwar and Ayesha are now living together in a small house in a quiet place.

== Cast ==
- Prithviraj Sukumaran as Anwar Ahmed
- Prakash Raj as DIG Stalin Manimaran IPS
- Lal as Babu Mather alias Babu Sait
- Mamta Mohandas as Ayesha Begum
- Assim Jamal as Salim
- Sampath Raj as Basheer Bhai
- Jinu Joseph as ACP Sathyanarayanan IPS
- Sudheer Karamana as Shaji
- Saikumar as Ahmed Haji, Anwar's father
- Geetha as Rasiya Begum, Anwar's mother
- Nithya Menen as Asna Begum, Anwar's sister
- Salim Kumar as Ashraf
- Sreejith Ravi as Ottappalam Rasheed
- Sasi Kalinga as Moideen
- Rajeev Pillai as Terrorist
- Vinay Forrt as Abu
- Mahanadi Shankar
- Ranjith Velayudhan
- Shane Nigam as a boy at Telephone booth

== Production ==
Since the film takes place in Coimbatore, Prakash Raj's character speaks in Tamil. Shoot for the film started in March 2010. The main location was Kochi.

== Soundtrack ==
Anwar

Soundtrack album by Gopi Sundar
- Released: 3 September 2010
- Genre: World Music

The soundtrack of the film, composed by Gopi Sundar, was released on 3 September 2010. The album features seven songs with lyrics by Rafeeq Ahmed, with 7 songs in Malayalam version and 5 songs in Tamil version of the film.

In the 2011 Vanitha Film Awards, the song Kizhakku Pookkum won three awards: Best Song, Best Female Playback (Shreya Ghoshal) and Best Lyrics (Rafeeq Ahamed).

Malayalam Version

No.	Title	Performer(s)	Length
1.	"Kizhakku Pookkum"	Shreya Ghoshal, Navin Iyer, Sabari Brothers and Raqueeb Alam	5:08
2.	"Njan"	Prithviraj, Mamta Mohandas, Reshmi, Priya and Asif Akbar	3:44
3.	"Kanninima Neele"	Shreya Ghoshal and Naresh Iyer	3:53
4.	"Vijanatheeram"	Sukhwinder Singh, Blaaze	3:46
5.	"Kavitha Pol"	Gopi Sunder and A V Uma	4:30
6.	"Kanninima Neele"	Shreya Goshal and Gopi Sunder	3:33
7.	"A Hero Will Rise"	Gopi Sunder, Navin Iyer, Sethu Thankachan and Sree Charan	3:30

Tamil Version

No.	Title	Performer(s)	Length
1.	"Kizhakku Pookkum"	Priya Hemesh, Navin Iyer, Sabari Brothers and Raqueeb Alam	4:30
2.	"Naan"	Prithviraj, Mamta Mohandas	3:44
3.	"Kanninimai Pole"	Priya Hemesh, Anand Aravindakshan	3:53
4.	"Namaru Veeram"	Sukhwinder Singh, Blaaze	3:46
5.	"A Hero Will Rise"	Gopi Sunder, Navin Iyer, and Sree Charan	3:30

Telugu Version

No.	Title	Performer(s)	Length
1.	"Kalike Nomuna"	Anjana Soumya, Navin Iyer, Sabari Brothers and Raqueeb Alam	4:30
2.	"What You Feeling"	Harshika, Raghu Kunche	3:44
3.	"Enni Gamakalo"	Raghu Kunche, Anjana Soumya	3:53
4.	"Dhikkule Pekulinchela"	Saket, Blaaze	3:46

== Awards ==
Filmfare Awards

won

- Best Music Director – Gopi Sundar
- Best Female Playback Singer – Shreya Ghoshal – "Kizhakk Pookkum"
- Best Lyricist – Rafeeque Ahmed – "Kizhakku Pookkum"

Nominated

- Best Actor – Prithviraj Sukumaran
- Best Negative role – Lal
