= Bhavana (actress) =

Indian film actress (born 1986)

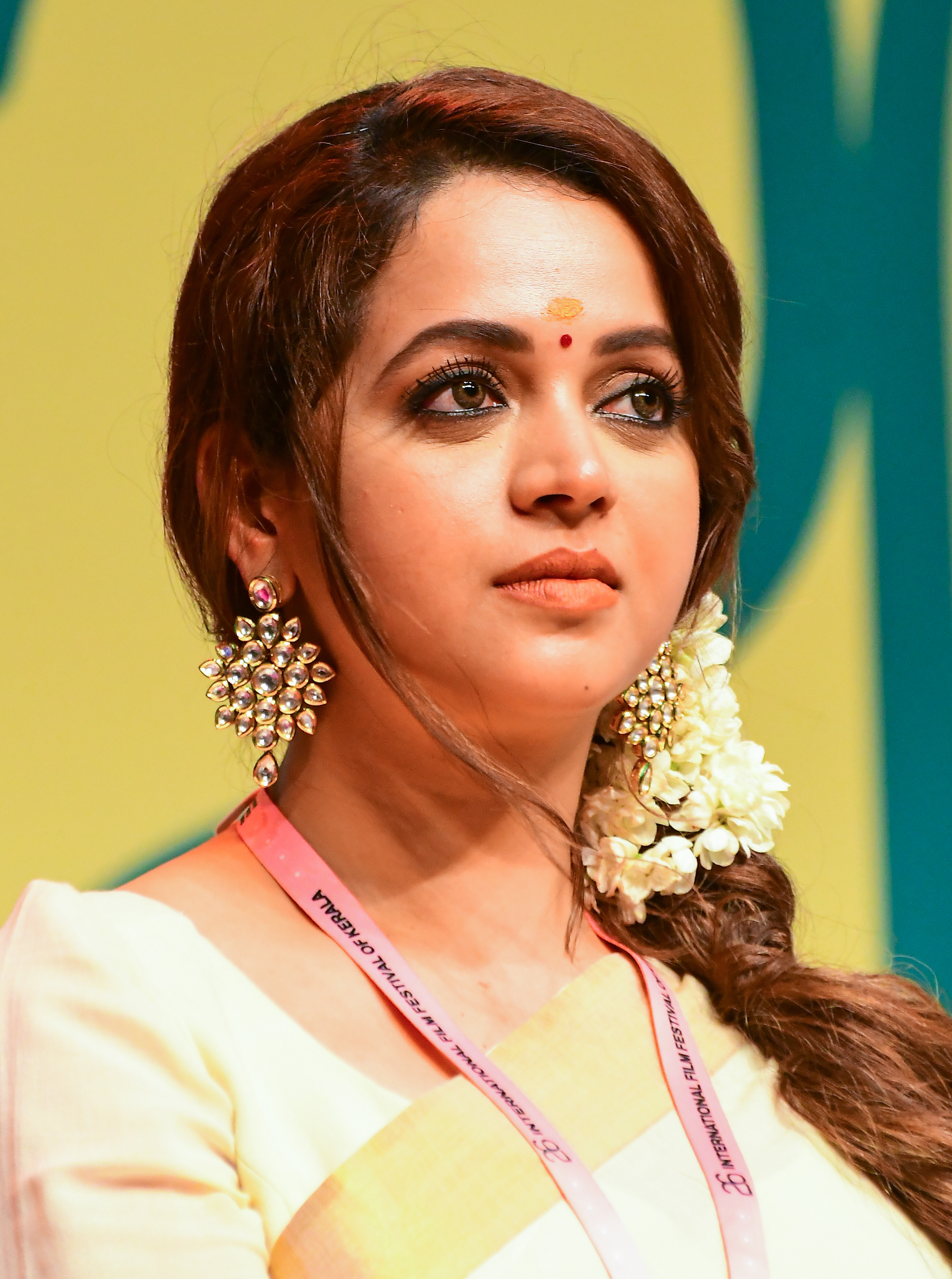
- Bhavana in 2022
- Born: Karthika Menon; 6 June 1986 (age 40); Thrissur, Kerala, India
- Occupations: Actress; dancer
- Years active: 2002–present
- Spouse: Naveen (m. 2018)

Karthika Menon (born 6 June 1986), known by her stage name Bhavana, is an Indian film actress who predominantly appears in Malayalam films. She made her acting debut at the age of 15 with the Malayalam film Nammal (2002).

== Early life ==
Bhavana was born as Karthika Menon on 6 June 1986 in Thrissur, Kerala. She is the daughter of assistant cinematographer G. Balachandran and Pushpa. She has an elder brother, Jayadev. She was educated at Holy Family Convent Girls School in Chembukkavu, Thrissur.

Bhavana has described herself as a restless person and someone who's "hard to handle". When she was young, she dreamed of becoming an actress. She was an 11th standard student when she got her break in a film career.

== Career ==
Bhavana made her acting debut in the Malayalam film Nammal (2002) at the age of 15. She portrayed the character Parimalam, and the role proved to be her breakthrough performance. The following year she had six releases, Thilakkam, Chronic Bachelor, C.I.D. Moosa, Swapnakoodu, Ivar and Valathottu Thirinjal Nalamathe Veedu failed at the box office. In 2005, she appeared in Hridayathil Sookshikkan, Police, directed by V. K. Prakash Banglavil Outha. and Daivanamathil. She then appeared in Chanthupottu, Naran and Bus Conductor.

In 2006, she made her debut in Tamil cinema with the release of Chithiram Pesuthadi. She then starred in Chinthamani Kolacase, Kisan, Chess, and despite having mixed reviews Kizhakku Kadarkarai Salai, Veyil, and Koodal Nagar. In 2007, she starred in Deepavali, Chotta Mumbai,Aarya, and Rameswaram In 2008, she was seen in the films, Vaazhthugal, Ontari which marks her Telugu debut film,Hero,Jayamkondaan, Twenty:20, Lollipop Sagar Alias Jacky Reloaded, Winter,Robin Hood, Mahatma, Happy Husbands, and Aasal.

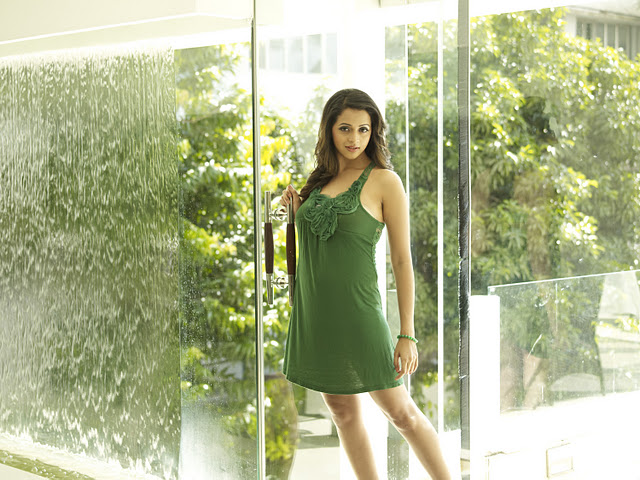
Bhavana during Celebrity Cricket League calendar shoot in 2012

In 2010, she was seen in the Kannada film alongside Puneeth Rajkumar, Jackie, Marykkundoru Kunjaadu with Dileep, Doctor Love, Kudumbasree Travels, The Metro, Oru Marubhoomikkadha, Vishnuvardhana, Nippu, Romeo, Ozhimuri, Trivandrum Lodge, Yaare Koogadali, Topiwala and Bachchan. Her next films were Honey Bee and Ezhamathe Varavu, She appeared in films such as Polytechnic, Koothara, Angry Babies in Love, Hello Namasthe and Kuttikalundu Sookshikkuka, all of which were poorly received.

She was a part of Ivide, Chowka, Honey Bee 2: Celebrations, Adventures of Omanakuttan, Vilakkumaram, Adam Joan. In 2018, she starred in Tagaru, and 99, In 2021, she appeared in a series of Kannada films, Inspector Vikram, SriKrishna@gmail.com, Govinda Govinda and Bhajarangi 2.

In 2022, it was announced that Bhavana would return to Malayalam cinema with Ntikkakkakkoru Premondarnn and the film was released in 2023.

She came back to Tamil cinema after 15 years, with the horror film The Door (2025).

== Abduction and sexual assault ==
In February 2017, she was kidnapped while returning home from a shoot and sexually assaulted by a group of men. In April 2017, media reports, citing statements by investigating police officials, alleged that actor Dileep had links to the main accused, Sunil N. S. (Pulsar Suni). In July 2017, Dileep was arrested by the investigating team, which said in its charge sheet that there was circumstantial evidence for Dileep's alleged conspiracy with the other accused men. He was released on bail in October 2017. In 2022, the police registered an additional case against Dileep and five others, alleging attempts to intimidate an investigating officer.

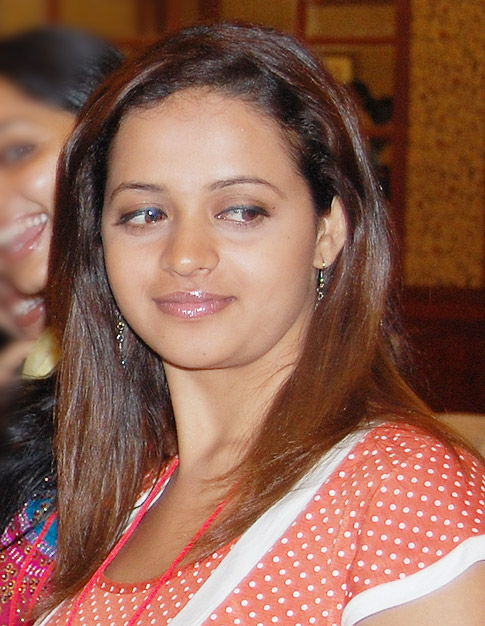
Bhavana in 2008

After the assault, Bhavana withdrew from the Malayalam movie industry for five years. Bhavana made her first comment about the case in 2022. She spoke of attempts to "humiliate, silence and isolate" her and said that the journey "from being a victim to becoming a survivor" had not been easy. Writing on her Instagram page, she vowed to keep striving for justice to ensure no one else had to endure such an ordeal.

Bhavana's assault partly contributed to the creation of Women in Cinema Collective and the formation of Hema Committee. A couple of months after Bhavana spoke out, the Kerala state assembly announced plans to implement legislation to protect women working in the Malayalam film industry.

The trial began on 8 March 2018 at a sessions court in Ernakulam and continued for eight years, with charges against 10 accused, including Dileep. On 8 December 2025, the Ernakulam Principal District and Sessions Court delivered its verdict, acquitting Dileep and three others, while convicting the main accused, Pulsar Suni, and five others. The convicted persons were sentenced to 20 years' imprisonment for gang rape, criminal conspiracy, and other offences. The court further directed that ₹5 lakh collected as fines be paid to Bhavana.

== Personal life ==
Bhavana and Kannada film producer Naveen were engaged in March 2017. The couple married on 22 January 2018.

== Media image ==
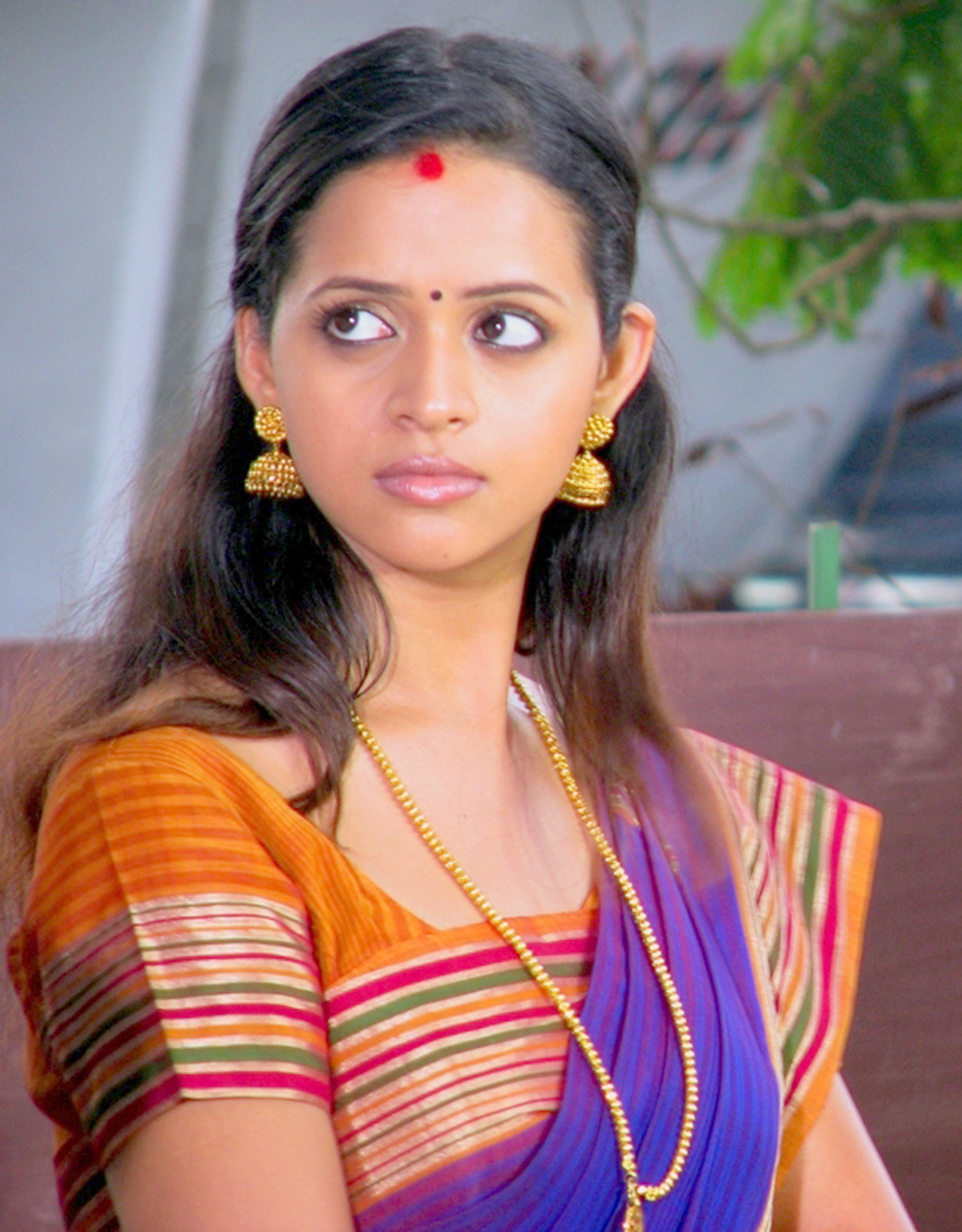
Bhavana in 2009

Bhavana was one among the highest-paid Malayalam actresses. In the Bangalore Times Most Desirable Women list, Bhavana was placed 27th in 2017, 23rd in 2019, and 30th in 2020.

== Filmography ==
=== Films ===
Key
†	Denotes films that have not yet been released

Year	Title	Role	Language	Notes
2002	Nammal	Parimalam	Malayalam	
2003	Thilakkam	Gauri	Malayalam	Cameo appearance
2003	Chronic Bachelor	Sandhya	Malayalam	
2003	C.I.D. Moosa	Meenakshi Patel	Malayalam	
2003	Swapnakoodu	Padma	Malayalam	
2003	Ivar	Nandhini	Malayalam	
2003	Valathottu Thirinjal Nalamathe Veedu	Sangeetha Varma	Malayalam	
2004	Parayam	Sudha	Malayalam	
2004	Chathikkatha Chanthu	Indira	Malayalam	
2004	Runway	Special appearance	Malayalam	Special appearance in the song "Osalama Ailasa"
2004	Youth Festival	Parvathy	Malayalam	
2004	Amrutham	Mridula	Malayalam	
2005	Hridayathil Sookshikkan	Amritha	Malayalam	
2005	Police	Sethulakshmi	Malayalam	
2005	Bunglavil Outha	Aswathy	Malayalam	
2005	Daivanamathil	Sameera	Malayalam	
2005	Chanthupottu	Rosie	Malayalam	
2005	Naran	Leela	Malayalam	
2005	Bus Conductor	Sugandhi	Malayalam	
2005	Udayananu Tharam	Gayathri	Malayalam	
2006	Chithiram Pesuthadi	Charumathi (Charu)	Tamil	Tamil Debut
2006	Chinthamani Kolacase	Chinthamani Warrier	Malayalam	
2006	Kisan	Kilimathi	Malayalam	
2006	Chess	Dr. Radhika	Malayalam	
2006	Kizhakku Kadarkarai Salai	Priya	Tamil	
2006	Veyil	Meenakshi	Tamil	
2007	Deepavali	Susi	Tamil	
2007	Koodal Nagar	Manimekalai	Tamil	
2007	Chotta Mumbai	'Parakkum' Latha	Malayalam	
2007	Aarya	Deepika	Tamil	
2007	Rameswaram	Vasanthi	Tamil	
2008	Vaazhthugal	Kayalvizhi Thirunavukkarasu	Tamil	
2008	Ontari	Bujji	Telugu	Telugu Debut
2008	Mulla	Mentally challenged lady	Malayalam	Cameo appearance
2008	Jayamkondaan	Annapurani	Tamil	
2008	Hero	Krishnaveni	Telugu	
2008	Twenty:20	Ashwathy Nambiar	Malayalam	
2008	Lollipop	Rosebella	Malayalam	
2009	Sagar Alias Jacky Reloaded	Aarathi Menon	Malayalam	
2009	Winter	Shyama Ramdas	Malayalam	
2009	Robin Hood	Roopa Lakshmi	Malayalam	
2009	Mahatma	Krishnaveni	Telugu	
2010	Happy Husbands	Krishnendu Mukundhan	Malayalam	
2010	Aasal	Sulabha Pillai	Tamil	
2010	Jackie	Lakshmi	Kannada	Kannada Debut
2010	Marykkundoru Kunjaadu	Mary Ittichan	Malayalam	
2011	Kudumbasree Travels	Aswathy	Malayalam	
2011	The Metro	Anupama	Malayalam	
2011	Doctor Love	Ebin	Malayalam	
2011	Vishnuvardhana	Bharathi	Kannada	
2011	Oru Marubhoomikkadha	Eliana Thomas	Malayalam	
2012	Nippu	Vaishnavi	Telugu	Cameo appearance
2012	Romeo	Shruti	Kannada	
2012	Ozhimuri	Balamani	Malayalam	
2012	Trivandrum Lodge	Malavika	Malayalam	
2012	Yaare Koogadali	Bharathi	Kannada	
2013	Topiwala	Suman Bedi	Kannada	
2013	Bachchan	Dr. Ashwini	Kannada	
2013	Honey Bee	Angel	Malayalam	
2013	Ezhamathe Varavu	Bhanu	Malayalam	
2014	Polytechnic	Ashwathi Nair	Malayalam	
2014	Koothara	Swathy	Malayalam	
2014	Angry Babies in Love	Sarah	Malayalam	
2015	Mythri	Herself	Kannada	Cameo appearance
2015	Ivide	Roshni Mathew	Malayalam	
2015	Open Your Mind	Sandhya	Malayalam	Short flim
2015	Kohinoor	Lilly	Malayalam	Cameo appearance
2016	Hello Namasthe	Priya	Malayalam	
2016	Mukunda Murari	Rukmini	Kannada	Special appearance in the song "Murari Lola"
2016	Kuttikalundu Sookshikkuka	Shahida Gautham	Malayalam	
2017	Chowka	Bhoomika	Kannada	
2017	Honey Bee 2: Celebrations	Angel	Malayalam	
2017	Adventures of Omanakuttan	Pallavi	Malayalam	
2017	Vilakkumaram	Aswathy Ananthakrishnan	Malayalam	
2017	Honey Bee 2.5	Angel / Herself	Malayalam	Guest appearance
2017	Oru Visheshapetta Biriyani Kissa	Kumari Kamalambika	Malayalam	Guest appearance
2017	Adam Joan	Shwetha	Malayalam	
2018	Tagaru	Panchami	Kannada	
2019	99	S. Janaki Nagaraj (Jaanu)	Kannada	
2021	Inspector Vikram	Bhavana	Kannada	
2021	SriKrishna@gmail.com	Malavika	Kannada	
2021	Bhajarangi 2	Chinminki	Kannada	
2021	Govinda Govinda	Padmavathi	Kannada	
2023	Ntikkakkakkoru Premondarnn	Nithya	Malayalam	
2023	Rani: The Real Story	Teacher	Malayalam	
2024	Case of Kondana	ACP Lakshmi	Kannada	
2024	Nadikar	Ann Bava	Malayalam	
2024	Hunt	Keerthi Jayarajan	Malayalam	
2025	The Door	Mithra	Tamil	
2026	Anomie	Zara Philip	Malayalam	
2026	Spark	Vaidehi	Kannada	
2026	Pink Note †	Bhavana / Akanksha	Kannada	Post-production
2026	Uttarakaanda †	Veeravva	Kannada	Filming
2026	Yours Sincerely Ram †	TBA	Kannada	Filming

=== Television ===
All shows are in Malayalam-language.

Year	Title	Role	Channel/ Platform(s)	Notes
2019	Sa Re Ga Ma Pa Keralam	Guest	Zee Keralam	
2021	Boom Rang Village	Bhavana	YouTube	
2021	Let's Rock N Roll	Guest	Zee Keralam	
2021	Manju Bhavangal	Guest	Zee Keralam	
2021	Super 4 Juniors	Guest	Mazhavil Manorama	
2022	Sa Re Ga Ma Pa Keralam Li'l Champs	Guest	Zee Keralam	
2022	Oru Kodi	Participant	Flowers TV	
2023	Star Singer Junior	Guest	Asianet	
2025	Star Singer	Guest	Asianet	
2026	Comedy Cooks	Judge	Asianet; JioHotstar	

== Accolades ==
- 2003: Kerala State Film Award – Special Mention for Nammal
- 2003: Kerala Film Critics Association Award for Best Female Debut for Nammal.
- 2003: Asianet Film Award for Best Supporting Actress for Nammal.
- 2006: Kerala State Film Award for Second Best Actress for Daivanamathil.
- 2006: Asianet Film Award for Best Supporting Actress for Daivanamathil.
- 2007: Filmfare Award for Best Actress – Tamil for Chithiram Pesuthadi.
- 2024: Filmfare Award South - Special Award
