= Athe Mazha Athe Veyil =

- Film poster
- Directed by: G. Manu
- Produced by: Shaji Edapal
- Starring: Anoop Menon; Lena
- Cinematography: Pradab Prabhakaran
- Edited by: Venugopal
- Music by: Rajesh Mohan
- Production company: Golden Fork Group Dubai
- Release date: 9 December 2011
- Country: India
- Language: Malayalam

Athe Mazha Athe Veyil is a 2011 Malayalam drama film directed by G. Manu and starring Anoop Menon and Lena in the lead roles.

== Cast ==
- Anoop Menon as Raghuraman
- Lena as Sreelakshmi
- Jagathy Sreekumar
- Madhupal
- Master Ashwin as Sreekuttan
