= Honey Bee 2: Celebrations =

- Theatrical release poster
- Directed by: Lal Jr.
- Written by: Lal Jr.
- Produced by: Lal
- Starring: Asif Ali; Bhavana; Baburaj; Sreenath Bhasi; Balu Varghese; Mamitha Baiju; Lal; Sreenivasan
- Cinematography: Alby
- Edited by: Ratheesh Raj
- Music by: Deepak Dev
- Production company: Lal Creations
- Distributed by: Adam's World of Imagination
- Release date: 23 March 2017
- Running time: 138 minutes
- Country: India
- Language: Malayalam

Honey Bee 2: Celebrations (also known as Honey Bee 2) is a 2017 Indian Malayalam-language romantic comedy film written and directed by Lal Jr. It is a sequel to the 2013 film Honey Bee and features an ensemble cast, including Asif Ali, Bhavana, Baburaj, Sreenath Bhasi, Balu Varghese, Lal, Sreenivasan, Mamitha Baiju, Lena, Suresh Krishna, and Assim Jamal. The film is produced by Lal under Lal Creations. Honey Bee 2: Celebrations released on 23 March 2017.

Angel's brothers decide to get their sister married to Sebastian. As the story moves closer to the wedding, the huge contrast in the cultures of both families leads to a conflict of opinion. The film generally received negative reviews as a result it became a disaster at the box office.

== Cast ==
- Asif Ali as Sebastian Thampi Antony (Seban)
- Bhavana as Angel
- Baburaj as Fernando de Silva (Ferno)
- Sreenath Bhasi as Abu
- Balu Varghese as Ambrose Perera (Ambrose)
- Sreenivasan as Thampi Antony
- Mamitha Baiju as Sisily, Thampi Antony's daughter and Seban's sister
- Lal as HC Michael
  - Telly Sebastian as Young Michael
- Lena as Ruby Thampi Antony
- Suresh Krishna as Father Cochin/Collin's
- Arun as Vineeth
- Assim Jamal as Antony
- Harisree Asokan as Kappal Ory
- Amith Chakalakkal as Martin
- Kavitha Nair as Lisamma (Replaced Praveena)
- Arya Rohit as Sara Perera (Replaced Archana Kavi)
- Krishna Praba as Ancy (Replaced Melba Babu)
- Joy Mathew as Cleetus
- Ponnamma Babu as Ferno's mother
- Prem Kumar as Chackochan, Thampi Antony's brother
- Ganapathi.S.Poduwal as Benny
- Sreelatha Namboothiri as Ammachi
- Sudhi Koppa
- Anjana Appukuttan as TV Serial actress
- Rithu Manthra

== Production ==
A sequel to Honey Bee was immediately announced after the release of the film in 2013. However, due to various reasons, the project was delayed for two years. Later, Lal Jr. announced that apart from the original cast, actors Sreenivasan and Lena would also be essaying pivotal roles in the film. The film's puja (blessing) ceremony was held on 7 November 2016 in Kochi.

== Soundtrack ==
Honey Bee 2

Soundtrack album by Deepak Dev
- Released: 11 March 2017
- Genre: Film soundtrack
- Language: Malayalam
- Label: Millennium audios

Deepak Dev chronology
King Liar (2016)	Honey Bee 2 (2017)

The film's soundtrack contains three songs, composed by Deepak Dev, and the lyrics were written by Santhosh Varma.

Track listing
No.	Title	Singer(s)	Length
1.	"Nerane Nummade Kochi"	Peethambar Menon, Thoppil Anto	3:24
2.	"Jillam Jillala"	Afsal, Rimi Tomy, Anwar	4:21
3.	"Kinavaano"	Deepak Dev	3:02

== Release ==
Honey Bee 2 was released on 23 March 2017 in 125 screens across Kerala. It was released alongside Take Off.
