= Nadikar =

- Theatrical release poster
- Directed by: Lal Jr.
- Written by: Suvin S. Somasekharan
- Produced by: Naveen Yerneni; Y. Ravi Shankar; Allan Antony; Anoop Venugopal
- Starring: Tovino Thomas; Divya Pillai; Balu Varghese; Suresh Krishna; Soubin Shahir; Shine Tom Chacko; Indrans; Anoop Menon; Bhavana
- Cinematography: Alby
- Edited by: Ratheesh Raj
- Music by: Yakzan Gary Pereira; Neha Nair
- Production companies: Godspeed Cinema; Mythri Movie Makers
- Distributed by: Aan Mega Media
- Release date: 3 May 2024
- Running time: 140 minutes
- Country: India
- Language: Malayalam
- Budget: ₹40 crore
- Box office: est.₹5.39 crore

Nadikar (transl. Actor) is a 2024 Indian Malayalam-language comedy drama film directed by Lal Jr. and written by Suvin S. Somasekharan. Jointly produced by Godspeed Cinema and Mythri Movie Makers, the film stars Tovino Thomas, Divya Pillai, Soubin Shahir, Balu Varghese, Suresh Krishna, and Bhavana. The film follows the life of a superstar film actor who is going through a rough patch.

The film was released in theatres on 3 May 2024. The film received mixed-to-negative reviews from critics and was a box office bomb.

== Plot ==
David Padikkal is a popular actor in the Malayalam film industry. He always has his manager Paily Kuruvilangad and his make-up man-cum-driver Lenin by his side. All of his previous films have been superhits and as a result, he lives off a superstar status in the industry. David is shown to be a very irresponsible and arrogant person, always partying with girls, and not showing up to shoot locations on time. Due to the same reasons, his last three films have flopped and the crew of his next film which is directed by Dhyan Sreenivasan aren't confident about the output of the film. Dhyan tries calling David but he doesn't pick the call as he is busy partying.

One day, David comes home and finds a script of a film in which he is supposed to star and is directed by Koshy, an acclaimed director who is very strict on-set. David goes to set the next day and acts with his co-actor Chandradas. Koshy lashes out on David due to his inability to communicate expressions on-screen during the shot and abuses him. An angry David storms out of the set and while going away in his car, injures one of the crew members of the film. This causes significant damage to David's image, so David, Lenin and Paily decide to leave to Dubai and stay there until the issue cools down. Koshy's film is eventually shelved.

After returning from Dubai, Paily suggests that David meet Bala, an acting coach, to help in pointing out his weak areas in acting and improve them so that his films can fare better. They meet Bala, who agrees to help David. The next day, Bala meets David in his caravan and tries to tell him how to perform his role, but David, who is intoxicated due to substance abuse, tells Bala that he can do it on his own and sends him out. During the shot, David is unable to act properly due to being intoxicated but when Bala goes to help him, David tells him to go away as he doesn't want anyone to know that he has hired an acting coach as it will damage his public image. He also tells his crew members that Bala is the driver that had driven the car the day he had injured the crew member on director Koshy's set, in order to hide the same fact. Later, after the shot is over, David cancels his contract with Bala in frustration and sends him back. David then calls his ex-girlfriend and former co-star Ann Bava and tells her that his career is declining. Ann tells him to stop going behind girls and using drugs and tells him to focus on his acting career instead. She also tells him to stop considering himself a superstar and consider himself an actor instead and listen to what the other crew members tell him to do.

After his call with Ann, David realizes his mistake and decides to get Bala back. Bala agrees to help him once again. Then, Bala helps David on the set of his films and his acting significantly improves. Then, at a press conference, David tells his fans that his films have been flopping lately and asks them about which one of his performances they think is his best to date. He realizes that they don't have an answer as none of his performances have been impactful in reality. Bala also tells David to forget about his superstar status and identity and start treating himself as an actor.

As the days go by, David gets a chance to act in a film directed by his mentor, S. Sasi. David goes to act in the film, but as the shoot progresses, a few locals come to the set and start creating a commotion. In the process, they attack the director and some other crew members. Shoot is called off for the day. Later, as they are sitting in their room, a drunk David yells at Bala and Lenin due to the frustration of all his films flopping and verbally abuses both of them. A heartbroken Bala cuts off all ties with David and leaves. Lenin also feels dejected due to David shouting at him and considers his love towards Lenin to be fake. Meanwhile, David starts to feel guilty about shouting at Bala and doesn't eat anything for a few days. Also, his guilt due to abusing Bala and the pain of his mother leaving him in his childhood surfacing back, he delivers one of his best performances in an emotional sequence new film. He tells Paily that he's done making bad films and that he wants a hit film somehow.

David then decides to mend things up with both Koshy and Bala. He goes to Koshy's house and apologizes for his behavior on Koshy's set earlier. That night, he decides to patch up with Ann and goes to her house with a cake. But as he opens a cake to cut it with her, he gets a call from one of his fans, who informs him that he is about to commit suicide due to love failure. David rushes to save his life. He reaches there and sees that the person hasn't jumped yet, but due to the excitement of seeing David, the person accidentally slips from the bridge and falls underwater. David also jumps underwater to save the person's life but that person ends up saving David's life instead due to the latter's inability to swim underwater. David then takes the person to his house and gives him a place to stay.

The next night, David goes to Bala's house to apologize to him. Bala tells him that he never had any grudge against David and treats him with a biriyani. David then tells Bala that he wants the latter to come back with him, to which Bala replies that there is no point in him coming back as his job with David is complete and he doesn't need anyone's help now. A few days later, David resumes shoot on director Koshy's film and nails the first shot, which impresses Koshy. The film ends with David telling Bala that their mission is accomplished.

== Cast ==
- Tovino Thomas as David Padikkal
- Divya Pillai as Stella Padikkal
- Bhavana as Ann Bava
- Soubin Shahir as Bala
- Balu Varghese as Lenin
- Suresh Krishna as Paily Kuravilangad
- Anoop Menon as Chandradas a.k.a. 'Kuttan'
- Devika Gopal Nair
- Maala Parvathy
- Althaf Salim
- Madhupal as S. Sasi, director
- Ranjith as Koshy, a film director
- Shaun Xavier as Director Shaunraj
- Dinesh Prabhakar
- Khalid Rahman
- Major Ravi
- Abhiram Radhakrishnan
- Abu Salim as Zachariah, a stunt master
- Sminu Sijo as Bala's mother
- Aiswarya Suresh as Nancy, Ann's cousin
- Rajith Kumar as Security

Cameo Appearance

- Lal as David's co-actor in the film "Love Jawan"
- Dhyan Sreenivasan as himself
- Ganapathy as David's friend
- Shine Tom Chacko as himself
- Indrans as David's co-actor in a film
- Manikuttan as David's co-actor in a film
- Vijay Babu as himself
- Chandu Salim Kumar as Manoj; David's fan
- Sushin Shyam as himself in the song "Kireedam"
- Chidambaram S Poduval as himself in the song "Kireedam"

== Production ==
Originally titled Nadikar Thilakam, the title of the film was officially changed to Nadikar in January 2024 at the request of fans of Tamil actor Shivaji Ganeshan who is known by that moniker. An event was conducted on 23 January 2024 to announce the name change and was attended by Prabhu Ganeshan, the son of Ganeshan.

Filming commenced on 11 July 2023. It was shot across 30 locations in Kochi, Munnar, Hyderabad, Dubai and Kashmir, lasting 110 days.

== Release ==
=== Theatrical ===
Nadikar was released on 3 May 2024.

=== Home media ===
After its theatrical release on 3 May 2024, Nadikar was initially reported to premiere on Netflix around 27 June 2024, in Malayalam, Tamil, Telugu, and Kannada languages. Later Netflix withdrawn from the film.

In July 2025, Saina Play later acquires the film and it starts to stream on 8 August 2025, ending the long await. While, Lionsgate Play and Amazon Prime Video also acquires the film and it later streamed on 24 October 2025 prior to Saina Play's OTT release.

== Reception ==
Arjun Menon of Rediff.com rated 2.5/5 stars and observed, "The film's focus lies in humanising a larger-than-life star and breaking down his celebrity, aimed at a simplistic takedown of the 'superstar' myth."

== Box office ==
This film was a Box-office disaster, only grossing ₹5 crore against a budget of ₹40 crore.
