= Thalappavu =

- Theatrical release poster
- Directed by: Madhupal
- Written by: Babu Janardhanan
- Produced by: Mohan
- Starring: Prithviraj Sukumaran; Lal; Atul Kulkarni
- Cinematography: Alagappan N
- Edited by: Don Max
- Music by: Alex Paul; Shyam Dharman
- Production company: Civic Cinema
- Distributed by: Lal Release
- Release date: 12 September 2008
- Country: India
- Language: Malayalam

Thalappavu (literal meaning: turban or headgear, which is a symbol of power, status and protection) is a 2008 Malayalam language period thriller film based on the events related to Naxal Varghese and Police Constable P. Ramachandran Nair, directed by Madhupal (in his directorial debut) and written by Babu Janardhanan. The film sympathetically portrays the social and political issues of the Naxalite era of the 1970s in Kerala. The film's cast includes Prithviraj Sukumaran, Lal and Atul Kulkarni. Produced by actor Mohan under the Civic Cinema banner and distributed by Lal's Lal Release, Thalappavu marks actor-cum-writer Madhupal's directorial debut.

The film released on 12 September 2008 (Onam) to critical acclaim. However, in the box-office it failed to recover the cost of production. The film got Kerala State Film Awards for Best Actor (Lal) and Best Debut Director (Madhupal), Kerala Film Critics Awards for Best Film, Best Director, Best Script writer, Amateur Little Theatre Award for Best Debutant Director, Sohan Antony Memorial Film Award for Best Director. The film was screened at the 13th International Film Festival of Kerala (IFFK) 2008 and Indian Habitat Film Festival 2009.

== Plot ==
The movie is based on a real-life confession of a police constable (P. Ramachandran Nair) about gunning down a Naxalite (Arikkad Varghese) in a fake encounter as per the order of his superiors in 1970. The screenplay by Babu Janardhanan uses the stream of consciousness flow to show the mental state of the constable who feels deranged after the incident. Constable Raveendran Pillai whose family life is ruined after the killing of Joseph (Prithviraj Sukumaran), a revolutionary leader fighting for the rights of the hapless farmers of Wayanad. Pillai is a misfit in the police force as he is not courageous or cruel as the others of his ilk. He is a family man to the hilt and dotes on his children. He befriends Joseph on the way while on duty. Joseph introduces him to the revolutionary ideas. Pillai takes instant liking for Joseph and roams in the forests with Joseph during his free time.

- P. Ramachandran Nair's confession was in Nov. 1998 to a magazine, whereas in the film the it takes place in the late 2000s to a television channel.

== Cast ==
- Prithviraj Sukumaran as Sakhavu Joseph (Sakhavu Varghese)
- Lal as Constable S. Raveendran Pillai (P. Ramachandran Nair)
  - Balu Varghese as Young Pillai
- Atul Kulkarni as Krishnadeva Saivar (Vasudeva Adiga)
- Dhanya Mary Varghese as Saramma
- Rohini as Karthyayani, Pillai's wife
- Sudheer Karamana as Nalinakshan
- Maniyanpilla Raju as Shivan Pillai
- Sreejith Ravi as Karunan
- Jagathy Sreekumar as Govinda Pillai
- Geetha Vijayan as Rosamma
- Saranya Sasi as Pillai's daughter
- Renjusha Menon as Narayani

== Production ==
His dream project Thalappavu was always there at the back of his mind, says Madhupal. "I was moved by the story of Varghese, a man who lived for others. More than his politics or his background, what attracted me was his willingness to help the most oppressed sections in society." Babu Janardhanan who wrote the script said he had carried out extensive research on the life of Naxal Arikkad Varghese before capturing it on paper. "The spark for the script came from the revelation made by Ramachandran Nair (the police constable) through television channels that he was forced to kill Varghese,” said Janardhanan. "The revelation struck me and I started to think about the mental agony he had to endure by suppressing the fact for nearly 30 years," he said. Janardhanan, the script writer, and Madhupal sketched the whole film, shot by shot. Madhupal says his stint with Rajiv Anchal in Hollywood, Los Angeles helped him polish the quality of the sound track of Thalappavu. "For them, natural sound is of utmost importance. They also use it as transitions. Sound will appear before the cut to lead you to the next scene. We have also used sound to enhance cuts and dissolves. Travelling sound also contributed in smoothening the transitions."

Parts of the film were shot in Alappuzha, Changanassery and in the rubber plantations near Kothamangalam. Paucity of funds did bog the production of the film and it was released on 12 September 2008.

The film was praised for its script (Babu Janardhanan), flawless treatment, acting (Lal) and cinematography (Azhagappan). That Thalappavu was Madhupal's crowning glory became clear when veterans like M. Mukundan and R. Sukumaran (Paadha Mudra and Rajashilpi) gave the film their stamp of approval. Litterateur M. T. Vasudevan Nair also expressed a desire to watch his film. However, Madhupal denied allegations that the film set against the backdrop of the Naxalite movement reflected his sympathies for the political ideology. "The film is not an attempt to show my sympathy or political views. It is a reminder to a society that has forgotten how to respond to the problems faced by human beings," he said. His new role of a director in Malayalam film industry has made Madhupal a much sought-after star, something that eluded him in his roles as actor, assistant director and scenarist. "While walking into a restaurant the other day, I overheard a few taxi drivers saying: "See, Madhupal, director of Thalappavu." Till then I had always been referred to as the serial actor Madhupal, villain Madhupal and so on...I am still getting used to this new avatar," says the actor-turned-director.

== Soundtrack ==
Music: Alex Paul, Shyam Darman, Lyrics: O. N. V. Kurup

- "Kanninu Kuliraam" - K. S. Chitra
- "Vananeelimayil" - Ramesh Babu
