= Lal (actor) =

Indian actor and filmmaker (born 1958)

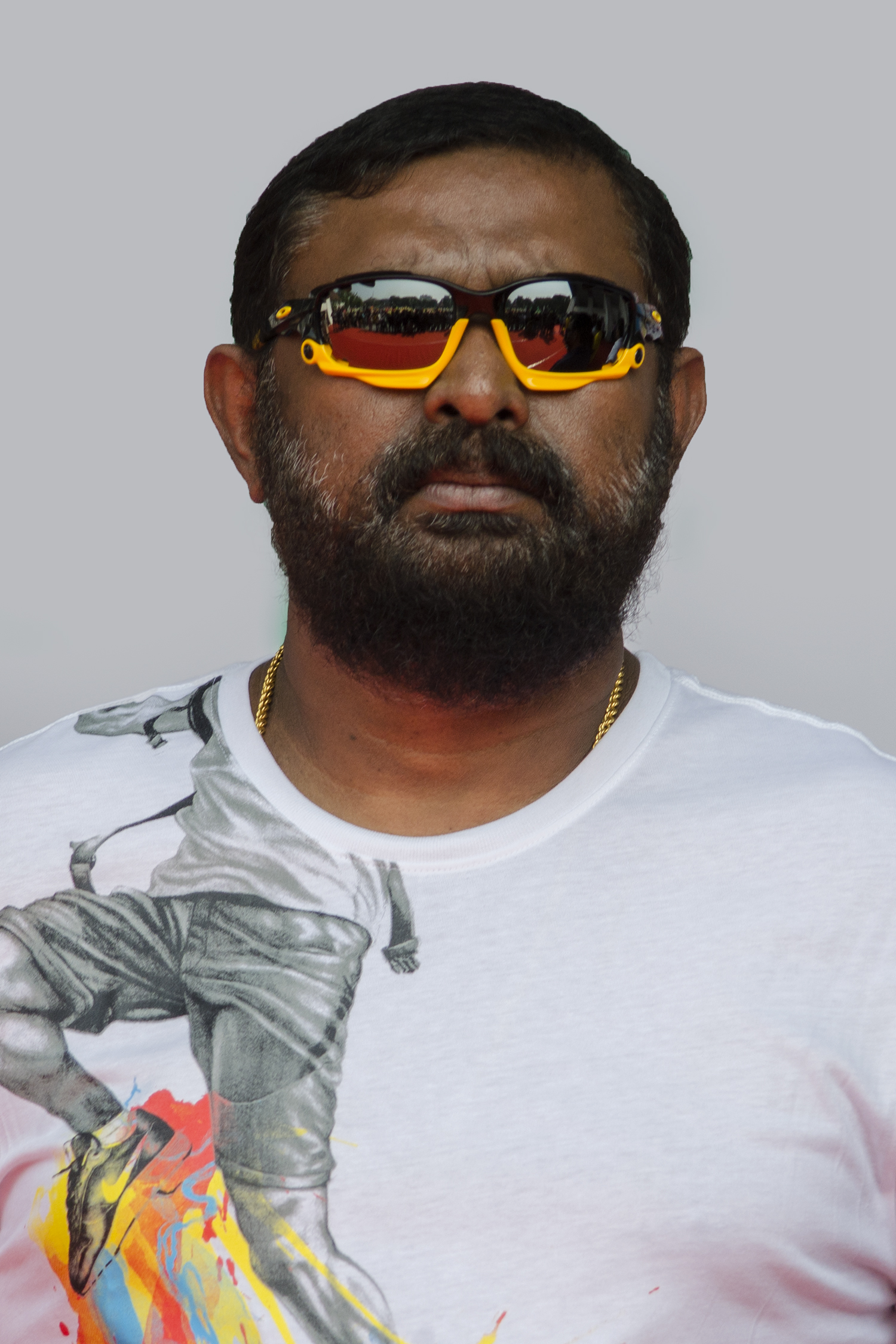
- Lal in 2015
- Born: M. P. Michael; 2 December 1958 (age 67); Kochi, Kerala, India
- Occupations: Actor; director; screenwriter; producer; distributor
- Years active: 1984–present
- Spouse: Nancy Lal (m. 1987)
- Children: 2 (including Jean Paul Lal)

M. P. Michael (born 2 December 1958), better known by his stage name Lal (pronounced [laːl]), is an Indian actor, director, screenwriter, producer and distributor who predominantly works in Malayalam and Tamil films and in a few Telugu films. Lal has won several awards, including a National Film Award – Special Mention for acting (2012), two Kerala State Film Awards for Best Actor (2008, 2013), and a Filmfare Award for Best Actor – Malayalam (2008). He is the owner of Lal Media Arts, a post-production studio.

== Early life ==
Lal was born as Michael to the late M. A. Paul and late Philomina, as their eldest son. He received his schooling at St. Augustine's High School, Ernakulam. His brother, Alex Paul is a music composer in the Malayalam film industry and his son, Jean is a movie director in the same industry. Lal's younger sister Neena's son, Balu Varghese is an actor in the Malayalam film industry.

== Career ==
He started his career as a mimicry artist in Kalabhavan, along with his childhood friend Siddique, who would later team up as Siddique-Lal to make many films. Lal and Siddique began their film career working as assistant directors to Fazil in Nokkethadhoorathu Kannum Nattu.

Siddique-Lal production had never been dependent on star value or superstar formula that was witnessed in those days in Malayalam cinema. They had always opted out from casting Mohanlal or Mammootty. Ultimately, both of them had changed their thoughts later and when their fourth production film was to get launched, Siddique-Lal had opted for Mohanlal and made Vietnam Colony (1992) which did wonders in the box office too. The duo again had combined in their fifth production and made Kabooliwala (1994), which was also a success.

After that, both decided to part ways as a director pair and Lal turned producer with the Siddique-directed Mammootty-starrer Hitler. Lal debuted in acting with a villain role as Paniyan in Suresh Gopi-starrer Kaliyattam, directed by Jayaraj. Kaliyattam was a new take on Othello, where Lal played Paniyan, the character standing for Iago. He runs a film post-production company named as Lal Media Arts, Kochi. The year 2009 saw his comeback again as a director. He directed the sequel to In Harihar Nagar named 2 Harihar Nagar, which got released and was declared a hit. For his performance in the 2012 film Ozhimuri, he won the National Film Award – Special Mention. He was won of Kerala State Film Award for Best Actor in Thalappavu (2008), Ayaal (2013) and Zachariayude Garbhinikal (2013). He later directed films like King Liar (2016), and Tsunami (2021).

Lal, who also plays an important role in Sulthan (2021) and also heaped praise on Mari Selvaraj for Karnan (2021). Despite being given the most uni-dimensional character in the story Taanakkaran (2022), the actor effortlessly carries the role and leaves arguably more impact than in his previous outing. He roped in to play the role of a warrior in Mani Ratnam’s Ponniyin Selvan: I (2022) and Ponniyin Selvan: II (2023).

He starred in the Malayalam web series Kerala Crime Files (2023) as Inspector which was released on Disney + Hotstar. and joined season 2 of Amazon prime series Suzhal.

== Personal life ==
Lal is married to Nancy and they have two children— a son Jean Paul Lal and a daughter Monica Lal. Jean Paul is a film director.

== Awards ==
List of Lal awards
Award	Year	Category	Film	Result
National Film Awards	2012	Special Mention for Acting	Ozhimuri	Won
Kerala State Film Awards	1991	Best Film with Popular Appeal and Aesthetic Value	Godfather	Won
Kerala State Film Awards	2008	Best Actor	Thalappavu	Won
Kerala State Film Awards	2013	Best Actor	Ayaal; Zachariayude Garbhinikal	Won
Filmfare Awards South	2008	Best Actor (Malayalam)	Thalappavu	Won
Asianet Film Awards	2010	Best Director	In Ghost House Inn	Won
Vanitha Film Awards	2012	Best Star Pair (shared with Shwetha Menon	Salt N' Pepper	Won

== Filmography ==
Key
†	Denotes films that have not yet been released

=== As an actor ===
==== Malayalam ====
List of Lal Malayalam film credits
Year	Title	Role	Notes
1994	Manathe Kottaram	Guest at the wedding	Cameo appearance
1997	Kaliyattam	Paniyan/Iago	
1998	Kanmadam	Johnny	
1998	Punjabi House	Sikkandar Singh	
1998	Daya	Kombanali	
1998	Chanchal	Jeevan	
1999	Friends	Man at the park	Cameo appearance
1999	Chandranudikkunna Dikhil	Parthan	
1999	Jananaayakan	Misra	
2000	Mazha	Chandran	
2000	Arayannangalude Veedu	Sukumaran	
2000	Nakshathragal Parayathirunnathu	Gowrishankar	
2000	Thenkasipattanam	Dasappan	
2001	Ee Nadu Innale Vare	Plappalli Sreedharan	
2001	Randam Bhavam	Mohammad Ibrahim	
2001	Unnathangalil	Shiva	
2001	One Man Show	Hari Narayanan	
2002	Ente Hridayathinte Udama	Pavitran	
2002	Kannaki	Manikyan	
2002	Krishna Gopalakrishna	Swamiji	
2002	Kalyanaraman	Thekkedathu Achuthankutty	
2003	Uthara	Ambi	
2003	Sinkari Bolona	Deva Sharma	
2003	Anyar	Raghavan	
2003	Pulival Kalyanam	Karunan	
2004	Chathikkatha Chanthu	Film Director Harikrishnan	
2004	Ee Snehatheerathu	Chinnappa Gounder	
2004	Black	Devin Carlos Padaveedan	
2005	Thommanum Makkalum	Sathyan	
2005	Banglavil Outha	Outha	
2005	Chanthupottu	Divakaran	
2006	The Don	Kasim Baba	
2006	Pothan Vava	Himself	Cameo appearance
2006	Oruvan	Bharathan	
2007	Panthaya Kozhi	Raghavan	
2007	Time	Dr. Srinivasa Iyengar	
2007	Rock N' Roll	Issac	
2008	Pachamarathanalil	Mohammed Ali	
2008	Thalappavu	S. Raveendran Pillai	
2008	Aayudham	Swami Antony Williams	
2008	Twenty:20	Radhakrishnan	
2009	Thirunakkara Perumal		
2010	Aagathan	Major George Joseph	
2010	April Fool	Dr. Mohana Chandran	
2010	Penpattanam	Inspector Antony	
2010	Anwar	Babu Sait	
2010	Shikkar	Dancer Eldho Aashaan	Cameo appearance in the song "Sembakame"
2010	Best Actor	Vandippetta Shaji	
2010	Kandahar		
2011	Payyans	James Varghese	
2011	Salt N' Pepper	Kalathipparampil Kalidasan	
2011	Bombay March 12	Nissar	
2011	Doctor Love	Himself	Cameo appearance
2011	Vellaripravinte Changathi	Himself	
2012	Father's Day	Seethalakshmi's suitor	
2012	Unnam	Sibi	
2012	Cobra	Kari (Karimoorkhan)	
2012	Ozhimuri	Thanupillai & Sivanpillai	
2012	Scene Onnu Nammude Veedu	Ottappalam Unni	
2012	Little Master		
2012	Husbands in Goa	Sunny	
2012	Chettayees	Jacob	
2013	Isaac Newton S/O Philipose	Isaac Newton	
2013	Maad Dad	Palachottil Geevargees Kuriyakose Easo	
2013	Shutter	Rasheed	
2013	10:30 am Local Call	Govindan, Nimmy's father	
2013	Kaattum Mazhayum	Hajiyar	
2013	Abhiyum Njaanum	Nandan Menon	
2013	Ayaal	Gurudasan	
2013	Honey Bee	HC Michael	
2013	Buddy	Michael Dominic Savio	
2013	Sringaravelan	Yesudas	
2013	Zachariayude Garbhinikal	Zacharia	
2013	Idukki Gold	Behnnan	
2013	Vishudhan	Mathew Pokkiriyachan	
2013	Kadhaveedu	Major Frederick Mukundan	
2014	Happy Journey	Gopikrishnan	
2014	God's Own Country	Mohammad	
2014	Hi I'm Tony	Tony Kurishingal	
2014	Iyobinte Pustakam	Iyob	
2014	Nagaravaridhi Naduvil Njan		
2016	Swargathekkal Sundaram	Maniyan	
2016	32aam adhyayam 23aam vaakyam	Ravi Uncle / R.K. Varma	
2016	King Liar	Anand Varma	
2016	Dum	Xavier	
2016	Pulimurugan	Balaraman	
2016	Kappiri Thuruthu	Kadalakka Ustad	
2017	Fukri	Ramzan Ali Fukri	
2017	Honey Bee 2 : Celebrations	Michael	
2017	Oru Cinemakkaaran	Thomas	
2017	Zacharia Pothen Jeevichirippundu	Saji	
2017	Chunkzz	Varkichan	
2017	Honey Bee 2.5	As Himself	
2017	Oru Visheshapetta Biriyanikissa	Abu Musaliyar Mowlavi	
2017	Njandukalude Nattil Oridavela	K C Chacko	
2018	Iblis	Shreedharan	
2018	Vallikudilile Vellakaaran	Joseph	
2019	Pengalila	Azhagan	
2019	Thelivu	Khalid	
2019	Helen	Paul	
2019	Thakkol	Metropolitan Archbishop	
2020	Al Mallu	Father Paul	
2020	Silencer	Eenasu	
2020	Anveshanam	Dr. Faris	
2020	Bhoomiyile Manohara Swakaryam		
2021	Nizhal	Vishwanathan	
2021	Kala	Raveendran	
2021	Jan.E.Man	Kochu Kunj	
2022	Panthrandu	Peelu	
2022	Mahaveeryar	Rudhra Mahaveera Ugrasena Maharaja	
2022	Vichithram	Alexander	
2023	Dear Vaappi	Tailor Basheer	
2023	2018	Mathachan	
2024	Nadikar	David's co-actor	Cameo appearance
2025	Azadi	Sivan	
2025	Nancy Rani	Akkaraparambil Chackochan	
2025	Odum Kuthira Chaadum Kuthira	Mathew Thalachirayil	
2025	Ambalamukkile Visheshangal	Alex John	

==== Tamil ====
List of Lal Tamil film credits
Year	Title	Role	Notes
2004	Engal Anna	Sundaralingam / Veerapandi	
2005	Sandakozhi	Kasi	
2007	Marudhamalai	Maasi	
2007	Oram Po	Bigil	
2007	Aalwar	Punniyamoorthy	
2007	Madurai Veeran	Mayandi	
2007	Deepavali	Chidambaram	
2007	Rameswaram	Vasanthi's father	
2008	Kaalai	Jeevanandham IPS	
2009	Thoranai	Chennai Police Commissioner	
2009	Anthony Yaar?	Michael	
2009	Azhagar Malai	Rathnavelu	
2010	Porkkalam	Aslam Bhai	
2013	Kutti Puli	Arjunan	
2015	Chandi Veeran	Thamarai's father	
2018	Antony	George	
2018	Seema Raja	Karikkada / Kaathadi Kannan	
2018	Sandakozhi 2	Kasi	Special appearance
2020	God Father	Marudhu Singam	
2021	Sulthan	Mansoor	
2021	Karnan	Yeama Raja	
2022	Taanakkaran	Eshwaramurthy	
2022	The Warriorr	Kumarappa	
2022	Ponniyin Selvan: I	Tirukoilur Malaiyaman	
2023	Ponniyin Selvan: II	Tirukoilur Malaiyaman	
2023	Maamannan	CM Sindhanai Rajan	
2023	Tamil Kudimagan	Sudalaiyandi	
2024	Singapore Saloon	Chacha	
2024	Star	Pandian	
2025	Kadhalikka Neramillai	Sid's father	
2025	Surrender	Periyasamy	
2025	Bison Kaalamaadan	Kandasamy	
2026	Leader	Sathyamoorthy	
2026	Scene	Stephen	
2026	Enemy of the Smuggler		

==== Telugu ====
List of Lal Telugu film credits
Year	Title	Role	Notes
2006	Khatarnak	Smuggler	
2006	Annavaram	Puranapool Ganga	
2009	Pistha	Vizag Police Commissioner	
2019	Saaho	Ibrahim	
2022	The Warriorr	Kumarappa	
2023	Veera Simha Reddy	Sidhappa	
2025	They Call Him OG	Ibrahim	Cameo Appearance

==== Other Languages ====
List of Lal film credits in other languages
Year	Title	Role	Language
2007	Before the Rains	Rajat	English
2009	Yuvah	Dhoni	Kannada
2019	Saaho	Ibrahim	Hindi
2024	Mahadev Ka Gorakhpur	-	Bhojpuri

==== Web Series ====
List of Lal web series credits
Year	Title	Role	Language	Platform	Notes	Ref.
2023-2025	Kerala Crime Files	CI SHO Kurian	Malayalam	Disney+ Hotstar	Season 1,2	
2024	Killer Soup	Charles Lucas	Hindi	Netflix		
2025	Suzhal: The Vortex	Adv. Chellappa	Tamil	Amazon Prime Video	Season 2	

=== Director, writer ===
List of Lal film credits as director or writer
Year	Title	Credited as		Notes
Year	Title	Director	Writer	Notes
1986	Pappan Priyappetta Pappan		Yes	
1987	Nadodikkattu		Story	
1989	Ramji Rao Speaking	Co-director	Yes	Directorial debut as Siddique–Lal
1990	In Harihar Nagar	Co-director	Yes	
1991	Godfather	Co-director	Yes	
1992	Makkal Mahatmyam		Story	
1992	Vietnam Colony	Co-director	Yes	
1993	Kabooliwala	Co-director	Yes	
1993	Manichithrathazhu	2nd unit		
1995	Mannar Mathai Speaking		Yes	Sequel to Ramji Rao Speaking
2009	2 Harihar Nagar	Yes	Yes	Debut as independent director
2010	In Ghost House Inn	Yes	Yes	Sequel to 2 Harihar Nagar
2010	Tournament – Play & Replay	Yes	Yes	
2012	Cobra	Yes	Yes	
2016	King Liar	Yes	Co-writer	
2021	Tsunami	Co-director	Yes	

=== Producer, distributor ===
List of Lal film credits as producer or distributor
Year	Title	Credited as
1996	Hitler	Producer
1997	Superman	Producer
1999	Friends	Producer
2000	Thenkasipattanam	Producer; Distributor
2001	One Man Show	Distributor
2002	Kalyanaraman	Producer; Distributor
2003	Swapnakkoodu	Distributor
2004	Chathikkatha Chanthu	Producer; Distributor
2004	Black	Producer; Distributor
2005	Thommanum Makkalum	Producer; Distributor
2005	Bunglavil Outha	Distributor
2005	Bharathchandran I.P.S.	Distributor
2005	Chanthupottu	Producer; Distributor
2006	Chinthamani Kolacase	Distributor
2006	Classmates	Distributor
2006	Pothan Vava	Producer; Distributor
2007	Panthaya Kozhi	Producer; Distributor
2007	Nivedyam	Distributor
2007	Kangaroo	Distributor
2008	Cycle	Distributor
2008	Thalappavu	Distributor
2009	2 Harihar Nagar	Producer; Distributor
2010	In Ghost House Inn	Producer; Distributor
2010	Elsamma Enna Aankutty	Distributor
2010	Tournament – Play & Replay	Producer
2011	Salt N' Pepper	Distributor
2011	Violin	Distributor
2017	Honey Bee 2: Celebrations	Producer

=== Other crew credits ===
- 1987: Manivathoorile Aayiram Sivarathrikal – Script supervisor and assistant director (as Siddique–Lal)
