= Hi I'm Tony =

- Directed by: Lal Jr.
- Written by: Lal Jr.
- Produced by: Sibi Thoottapuram; Joby Mundamattum; Sajin Jaffar
- Starring: Asif Ali; Lal; Miya; Biju Menon; Lena
- Cinematography: Alby
- Edited by: Ratheesh Raj
- Music by: Deepak Dev
- Production companies: Ideas Inc; SJM Entertainments
- Distributed by: RJ Films
- Release date: 25 July 2014
- Country: India
- Language: Malayalam

Hi I'm Tony is a 2014 Indian Malayalam-language psychological horror film directed by Lal Jr. The film stars Lal in the title role alongside Asif Ali and Miya playing the lead pair. Biju Menon and Lena also play significant roles in the film. The film was released on July 25 on the occasion of Eid-ul Fitr.

== Plot ==
The movie is based on events that happen over a single night in Bangalore.

Sameer (Asif Ali) and Tina (Miya) elope to Bangalore after their days of love. They live in a flat owned by Achayan (Biju Menon). One night, a man named Tony (Lal) comes to their flat after he had an encounter with them. Later, he befriends them and goes into their flat where he starts torturing Sameer and Tina when they are alone. He asks them questions based on his life.

It is revealed that Tony killed his wife and daughter and put them in a bag and Tony came to Sameer in search of his wife's extra-marital affair with the person whom she affectionately calls 'Uncle Sam'. As Sam is a short name for Sameer, he gets in a fight with Sameer and later he is sodomised and killed by Sameer. Later, Achayan comes to their flat and sees the flat destroyed and Tony killed. Achayan goes out and buries the body. It is later shown that the body which was buried isn't Tony's but Achayan's.

A flashback shows that when Achayan tries to bury Tony's body, he gets up and attacks Achayan. Now Tony is going to take revenge against Sameer when a truck hits Tony and he is killed.

Later, we see Achayan's house where his wife (Lenaa) and his sons were in front of a wedding anniversary cake of them. Their children ask her when will Dad come and she says he will come soon. The frame moves from their room and goes out of their house and finally to the name board of their house which says 'Doc Samson', revealing that Achayan was the culprit and the real person that Tony was after.

== Cast ==
- Asif Ali as Sameer
- Miya as Teena
- Lal as Tony Kurishingal
- Biju Menon as Samson James / Achayan
- Lenaa as Elizabeth Achayan
- Balu Varghese as Balu
- Shaun Xavier as Jacob
