= Manoj Nair =

Indian writer, musician and journalist

- Died: Fort Kochi, Kochi
- Occupation: Journalist

Manoj Nair was an Indian writer, musician and journalist. He had worked for various news portals such as The Indian Express, The Asian Age, The Economic Times, Outlook Magazine, and Hindustan Times.

== Early life ==
Manoj was from Irinjalakkuda, Thrissur district. He did his schooling from Patna.

== Career ==
Manoj was a musician, writer and journalist. He has worked for various news portals such as The Indian Express, The Asian Age, The Economic Times, Outlook Magazine, Hindustan Times. He worked with The Economic Times from August 2004 to January 2012. He was an event editor of Kochi Muziris Biennale.

== Death ==
At the age of 49, he was found dead at his residence in Fort Kochi.

== Books ==
- Pencil Sketches
- Between the Rock and a Hard Place (Unreleased)

== Novels ==
- Dictionary of an Alcoholic (unreleased)
