= Lenaa =

Indian actress, author, scriptwriter (born 1981)

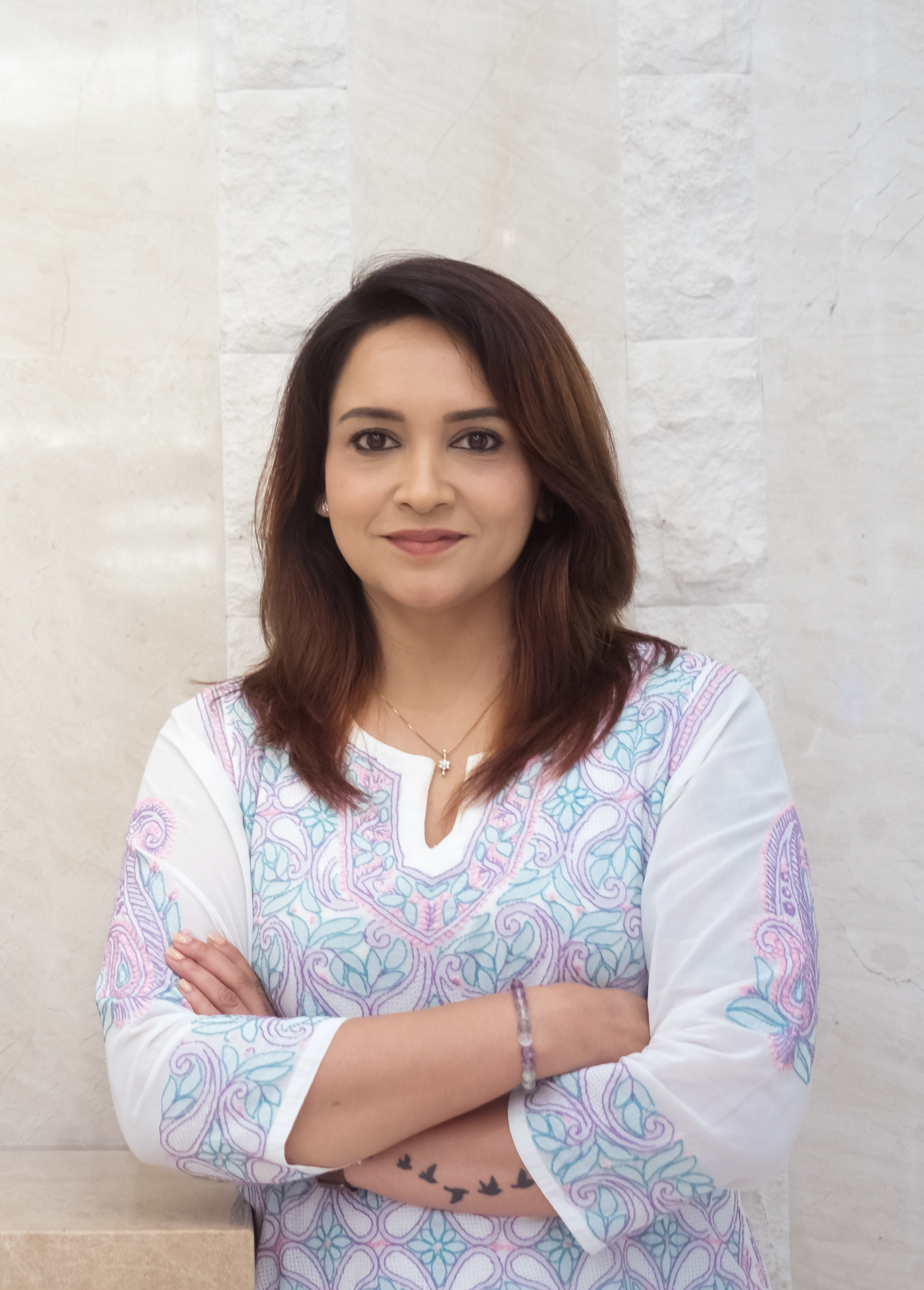
- Lenaa in 2022
- Born: Lena Mohan Kumar; 1981 (age 44–45); Kochi, Kerala, India
- Occupations: Actress; author; screenwriter
- Years active: 1998–present
- Spouse(s): Abhilash Kumar (m. 2004; div. 2013) Prasanth Balakrishnan Nair (m. 2024)
- Website: lenaalife.com

Lena Mohan Kumar (born 1981), known by her stage name Lenaa, is an Indian actress, author, and screenwriter who appears predominantly in Malayalam cinema and television apart from a few Tamil films.

== Early life ==
Lena was born to Mohan Kumar and Tina in Kochi, Kerala. Her mother Tina is a Catholic. Her father, who hails from Thrissur, was an officer in the State Bank of India. She has a sister named Tasha.

Lena had her primary schooling in Shillong. She then attended Seventh Day Adventist School and Hari Sri Vidya Nidhi School in Thrissur. Later she studied at Prajyoti Niketan College in Thrissur.

After securing a first rank in B.Sc. from the Calicut University, she did her post-graduation in Clinical Psychology in Mumbai. She later worked as a clinical psychology intern in Mumbai.

== Career ==
Lena made her debut in Jayaraj's Sneham, which was followed by critically acclaimed Karunam She had already established as a lead actress in the Malayalam television industry with serials like Omanathinkal Pakshi, Ohari, Malayogam and Thadankalpalayam before focusing on her film career. She is also a television host and manages the YouTube Vlogging channel – Lena's Magazine.

Some of her noted performances were in the critically acclaimed Traffic (2011) after which she acted in films such in Snehaveedu, Ee Adutha Kaalathu, Spirit, Left Right Left and Ennu Ninte Moideen in supporting roles. Lenaa will star alongside Adil Hussain (Parched, Hotel Salvation) in a British-Indian feature titled Footprints On Water, to be directed by Nathalia Syam.

In 2020, she said she had plans for a directorial debut as she confirmed the completion of the first draft of a new project.

In 2023, she published The Autobiography of God, a book about her life and views on mental health.

== Personal life ==
Lena was raised as a Christian; however, she embraced spirituality from 2004. She married her schoolmate Abhilash Kumar in 2004, whom she divorced in 2013. On 27 February 2024, she announced that she had married Group Captain Prasanth Nair, an astronaut designated for the Gaganyaan mission to space.

== Filmography ==
=== Malayalam films ===
List of Lena film credits
Year	Title	Role	Notes
1998	Sneham	Ammu	Debut Malayalam film
1999	Karunam	Nun	
2000	Oru Cheru Punchiri	Beena	
2000	Devadoothan	Annie Kurian	
2000	Indriyam	Sreedevi	
2000	Kochu Kochu Santhoshangal	Deepa	
2000	Shantham	Raghavan's wife	
2000	Varnakkazchchakal	Renuka	
2000	Manassu Muthal Manassu Vare		
2001	Randam Bhavam	Manikkutty	
2004	Koottu	Parvathi	
2007	Big B	Selina	
2008	De Ingottu Nokkiye	Julia	
2009	2 Harihar Nagar	Parvathi	
2009	Bhagavan	Maria	
2009	Daddy Cool	Adi's teacher	Cameo
2009	Robin Hood	Meera	
2009	Thirunakkara Perumal	Gracy	
2010	April Fool	Letha	Cameo
2010	Cocktail	Dr.Susan	Cameo
2010	In Ghost House Inn	Parvathi	
2010	Kaaryasthan	Saraswathi	
2010	Kanyakumari Express	Sneha Mohan	
2010	Raama Raavanan	Muthulakshmi/Malli	
2011	Athe Mazha Athe Veyil	Sreelakshmi	
2011	Khaddama	Zarina	
2011	Killadi Raman	Seethalakshmi	
2011	Snehaveedu	Lilly	
2011	Traffic	Shruthi	Won—SIIMA Award for Best Actress in a Supporting Role; Won—Filmfare Award for Best Supporting Actress – Malayalam; Won—Amrita Film Award for Best Supporting Actor (Female)
2011	Ulakam Chuttum Valiban	Annie	
2012	Asuravithu	Angel	
2012	Bachelor Party	Sheela Mathews Kattuparambil	
2012	Bavuttiyude Namathil	Sethu's friend	Cameo
2012	Chapters	Annie	
2012	Doctor Innocent Aanu	Adabia	
2012	Ee Adutha Kaalathu	Roopa Vasudevan	
2012	Matinee	Gayathri teacher	
2012	MLA Mani: Patham Classum Gusthiyum	MLA Lakshmi Priya	
2012	Naughty Professor	Tessa	
2012	Orange	Saritha	
2012	Spirit	ASP Supriya Raghavan	Won—Asianet Film Award for Best Supporting Actress
2012	Red Alert	Anu	
2012	Ustad Hotel	Fathima Abdul Razaq	
2013	101 Chodyangal	Sathi	
2013	Aaru Sundarimaarude Katha	Cyns Ria	
2013	Arikil Oraal	Aarathi	
2013	Ayaal	Devaki Antharjanam	
2013	Careebeyans	Ganga	
2013	Cowboy	Veena	
2013	David and Goliath	Jainamma	
2013	Left Right Left	Anitha	
2013	Kanyaka Talkies	Ancy	Won—Kerala State Film Award for Second Best Actress
2013	Tourist Home	Patient's wife	
2013	White Paper	Asha	
2013	Weeping Boy	Sreedevi Sahadevan	
2014	God's Own Country	Sereena	
2014	Happy Journey	Alice	
2014	Hi I'm Tony	Elizabeth Tony	
2014	Iyobinte Pustakam	Kazhali	
2014	London Bridge	Gracy	
2014	Njangalude Veettile Athidhikal	Maya	
2014	RajadhiRaja	Vidyalakshmi	
2014	Thomson Villa	Sheela Paul	
2014	Vellimoonga	Molly	
2014	Vikramadithyan	Lakshmi Nair	
2015	Alif	Fathima	
2015	The Reporter	Vinitha teacher	
2015	Ennum Eppozhum	Farah	
2015	Nee-Na	counsellor Pearl	
2015	Nirnnayakam	Government Pleader Nirmala	
2015	Love 24x7	Jayashree	
2015	Ennu Ninte Moideen	Pathumma	
2015	My God		
2015	Two Countries	Susan	
2016	Shajahanum Pareekuttiyum	Dr. Deepa Menon	
2016	Karinkunnam 6'S	IG Haritha Krishnan	
2016	Oru Muthassi Gada	Jean	
2016	Kavi Uddheshichathu..?	Gladys	
2017	Honey Bee 2: Celebrations	Ruby	
2017	Avarude Raavukal	Deepa Manoj	
2017	Honey Bee 2.5	Herself	
2017	Oru Visheshapetta BiriyaniKissa	Thaara	
2017	Thank You Very Much	Achyuth's mother	
2017	Adam John	Daisy	
2017	Ramaleela	Olga John	
2017	Vimaanam	Mable	
2017	Masterpiece	Minister Sethulakshmi Krishnadas	
2018	Aadhi	Rosy	
2018	Ira	Adv. Daisy	
2018	Bonsai	Mom	
2018	Suvarna Purushan	Mary	
2018	Johny Johny Yes Appa	S. Sujatha	
2018	Paviyettante Madhurachooral	Annie	
2019	Varikkuzhiyile Kolapathakam	Annie	
2019	Kodathi Samaksham Balan Vakeel	ADGP Indulekha	
2019	Athiran	Renuka	
2019	Oru Yamandan Premakadha	Diya's mother	
2020	Anveshanam	Sony	
2021	Sajan Bakery Since 1962	Betsy	
2021	Black Coffee	Ann	Sequel of the 2011 film Salt N' Pepper
2022	Bheeshma Parvam	Susan Anjoottikkaran	
2022	Twenty One Gms	SP Rachel	
2022	Two Men	Ameena	
2022	Monster	CI Mariyam George	
2022	Louis	Lakshmi	
2023	Ennalum Ente Aliya	Sulu	
2023	Oh My Darling	Jenny's and Jasmine's mother	
2023	Anuragam	Devika	
2023	Otta		
2023	Bandra	Hemaji	
2023	Dance Party		
2023	Khali Purse of Billionaires	Sakthi	
2023	Achanoru Vazha Vechu	Shalini Mithra	
2023	Olam	Huda Fukrudeen	Story, script and dialogues also by Lenaa
2023	Vanitha	SCPO Vanitha K S	
2023	Article 21	Thamarai	
2023	The Hope	Sara John	
2024	Qalb	Sauda	
2024	Idiyan Chandhu	Indu	
2024	Nunakkuzhi	Nancy	
2024	Pushpaka Vimanam		
2024	Kummatikali	Indira	
2025	Ouseppinte Osyath	Annie	
2025	Dominic and the Ladies' Purse	Lakshmi	
2025	Nancy Rani	Sister Clare	
2026	Valathu Vashathe Kallan	Theresa Samuel	
2026	Bouma	Jessy	

=== Other language films ===
List of Lena other language film credits
Year	Title	Role	Language	Notes
2015	Anegan	Dr. Radhika	Tamil	
2016	Airlift	Deepti Jayarajan	Hindi	
2017	Dr. Chakravarthy	Vandana Chakravarthy	Telugu	
2019	Kadaram Kondan	Kalpana	Tamil	
2020	Draupadi	Doctor	Tamil	
2022	O2	Manorama	Tamil	

== Television ==
List of Lena television credits
Year	Title	Channel	Role	Language	Notes
2002	Sneha	Asianet		Malayalam	
2005–2006	Omanathinkal Pakshi	Asianet	Jancy	Malayalam	
2006	Ohari	Amrita TV		Malayalam	
2006	Thadangal Palayam	Asianet		Malayalam	
2006–2007	Malayogam	Asianet	Revathi	Malayalam	
2007–2008	Chilluvilakku	Surya TV	Dr. Lekha	Malayalam	
2009	Aranazhika Neram	Amrita TV		Malayalam	
2009	Kanal Kireedam	Surya TV	Nandhini	Malayalam	
2010	Thulabharam	Surya TV	Shalini	Malayalam	
2010–2011	Alavudeente Albuthavilakku	Asianet	Mumthaz	Malayalam	
2011–2012	Pattukalude Pattu	Surya TV	Swapna	Malayalam	
2013–2014	Satyameva Jayate	Surya TV	Sherya Saran IPS	Malayalam	
2014	Manjuthirum Mumpe	DD Malayalam	Seetha Nandan	Malayalam	
2023	Shaitan	Disney+ Hotstar	Mary Joseph	Telugu	

== Independent projects and endorsements ==
=== As dubbing artist ===
- 2022 – K.G.F: Chapter 2 – voiceover for Raveena Tandon (Malayalam dubbed version)
- 2024 – Barroz – voiceover for Suneeta Rao
- 2025 – Identity – voiceover for Mandira Bedi

=== As host ===
- Your Choice (Asianet)
- Amul Sangeetha Mahayudham (Surya TV)
- Vivel Big Break (Surya TV)
- Lena's Magazine (YouTube)

=== Album ===
- Pranayam
- Pranayathin Ormakkayi
- Amma Manasam

=== Endorsements ===
- Grandma's
- MJ Foods
- Indulekha Bringa Hair Oil
- Maruthua Panja Jeerakam

== Awards ==
Year	Award	Category	Film	Result	Ref.
2008	Kerala State TV Awards	Best Actress	Aranazhika Neram	Won	
2008	Atlas Film Critics TV Award	Best Second Actress	Chilluvillakku	Won	
2011	Filmfare Awards South	Filmfare Award for Best Supporting Actress – Malayalam	Traffic	Won	
2011	Amrita Film Awards	Best Supporting Actress	Traffic	Won	
2011	Kerala Film Critics Association Awards	Second Best Actor (Female)	Traffic, Athe Mazha Athe Veyil	Won	
2012	Asianet Film Awards	Best Supporting Actress	Spirit	Won	
2015	Kerala Film Critics Association Awards	Second Best Actor (Female)	Ennu Ninte Moideen	Won	
2013	Kerala State Film Award	Second Best Actress	Left Right Left and Kanyaka Talkies	Won	
2013	South Indian International Movie Awards	Best Supporting Actor (Female)	Left RIght Left	Won	
2015	Asianet Film Awards	Best Character Actress	Ennu Ninte Moideen	Won	
2015	Vanitha Film Awards	Best Supporting Actor (Female)	Ennu Ninte Moideen	Won	
2015	South Indian International Movie Awards	Best Supporting Actor (Female)	Ennu Ninte Moideen	Won	
2015	Filmfare Awards South	Best Supporting Actor (Female)	Ennu Ninte Moideen	Won	
2015	1st IIFA Utsavam	Performance in a Supporting Role – Female	Ennu Ninte Moideen	Won	
2018	Master Vision International	Excellency Award	Many movies	Won	
2019	Toronto International South Asian Film Awards (TISFA)	Best Supporting Actress	Adam Joan & Vimaanam	Won	
2019	Janmabhoomi Legends of Kerala	Best Supporting Actress		Won	
2019	South Indian International Movie Awards	Best Supporting Actor (Female)	Aadhi	Won	
2022	Ramu Kariat Awards	Best Character Actress	Various films	Won	
