= Panthaya Kozhi =

- VCD cover
- Directed by: M. A. Venu
- Screenplay by: J. Pallasseri
- Produced by: Lal Creations
- Starring: Narain; Pooja; Rami Reddy
- Cinematography: Venugopal
- Edited by: V. Sajan
- Music by: Alex Paul
- Release date: 14 April 2007
- Country: India
- Language: Malayalam

Panthaya Kozhi is a 2007 Indian Malayalam drama film produced by Lal under the banner of Lal Creations. It is directed by M. A. Venu, who last did the critically acclaimed Chakoram in 1994. The film stars Narain, Pooja (in her debut of Malayalam film), Geetha and Rami Reddy. J.Pallassery wrote the screenplay for M.A Venu's story. The film was a success at the box office. The film was dubbed into Tamil under the same title.

== Plot ==
Nandagopal alias Nandu lives with his mother Madhavi and mute sister Maya at the mercy of his uncle. They learn that their late father Raghavan bought a bungalow in Kalikuthupalayam, Tamil Nadu. Nandagopal goes there to sell the property in order to overcome their financial difficulties. But it was not easy to sell the bungalow as Nachiappa Gounder, a cruel landlord refused the deal. Meanwhile, Nandu falls in love with Chembakam. Nandu's friends decide to bring his mother and sister to stay in the house. When Madhavi comes and sees the house, she gets shocked. For there is a story from the past that she remembers and that Nandagopal doesn't know. Finally, Nandu realises that Nachiappa's cruelty towards his family was only a part of enmity with roots in the past and he killed Raghavan in front of Madhavi. The rest of the movie is about how Nandagopal confronts Nachiappa and avenges Raghavan's death.

== Cast ==
- Narain as Nandagopal (Nandu)
- Pooja as Chembakam, Nandu's love interest
- Rami Reddy as Nachiyappa Goundar, the main antagonist
- Lal as DFO Raghavan Nair, Nandu's father
- Madhu as Abdu Rowther
- Geetha as Madhavi, Nandu's mother
- Remya Nambeesan as Maya, Nandu's sister
- Bose Venkat as CI Alex Antony
- Janardhanan as Sankaran Nair
- Rajan P. Dev as astrologer
- Cochin Haneefa as Parunthu Bhaskaran
- Sreejith Ravi as Seban
- Sudheesh as Balu
- Indrans as Rajappan
- Anoop Chandran as Musthafa
- Anil Murali as Anirudan
- T. P. Madhavan as Settu
- Mala Aravindan as Chakrapani
- Abu Salim as Constable Manikyam
- Lishoy as Dharmaraj, Chembakam's father
- Manka Mahesh as Bhanumathi

== Soundtrack ==
- "Elakozhiyum" - Biju Narayanan, Sujatha
- "Karimpanayude" - Pradeep, Reju Joseph
- "Sankatathinu" - Ramesh Babu, Vineeth Sreenivasan
- "Sankatathinu" - Liji Francis, Sangeetha Francis
- "Sundariye" - Swetha, Vidhu Prathap
