= Honey Bee 2.5 =

- Directed by: Shyju Anthikkad
- Screenplay by: Shyju Anthikkad
- Story by: Lal
- Produced by: Lal
- Starring: Askar Ali; Lijomol Jose; Asif Ali; Lal; Bhavana; Lena; Harisree Ashokan
- Cinematography: Antonio Michael
- Edited by: Ratheesh Raj
- Music by: Deepak Dev; A. M. Jose
- Production company: Lal Creations
- Release date: 18 August 2017
- Running time: 107 minutes
- Country: India
- Language: Malayalam

Honey Bee 2.5 is a 2017 Malayalam language romantic drama film produced by Lal under the banner of Lal Creations. It stars Askar Ali and Lijo Mol Jose in the lead roles along with Asif Ali, Lal, Bhavana, Lena, and Harisree Asokan. The film is directed by Shyju Anthikkad. The music is composed by A. M. Jose. The screenplay was based on a story written by Lal.

It was a derivative of Honey Bee 2: Celebrations. The peculiarity of the film is that it was shot during the break intervals of the set of Honey Bee 2: Celebrations.

== Plot ==
Vishnu, a youngster who has great potential to become an actor, is cast in a character role in the film, but for one or the other reason the character given to him slips out of his hand. He is not ready to give up and tries his best to take up the character. Meanwhile, Kanmani, actress Bhavana's make-up artist, falls in love with him and helps him realise the character.

== Cast ==
- Askar Ali as Vishnu
- Lijomol Jose as Kanmani
- Asif Ali as himself
- Lal as himself
- Sreenivasan as himself
- Bhavana as herself
- Harisree Asokan as himself
- Baburaj as himself
- Sreenath Bhasi as himself
- Arun as himself
- Jean Paul Lal as himself
- Sachy as himself
- Lena as herself
- Joy Mathew as himself
- Dileesh Pothan as Director Thomas George
- Ponnamma Babu as herself
- Balu Varghese as himself
- Indian Pallassery as Madhu
- Hareesh Perumanna as Usman
- Jayasurya as himself (cameo appearance)
- Vinayakan as himself (cameo appearance)

== Soundtrack ==
The music is composed by A M Jose.

- "Aminathatha"- Lal
