= Nisar Rahmath =

Indian film costume designer

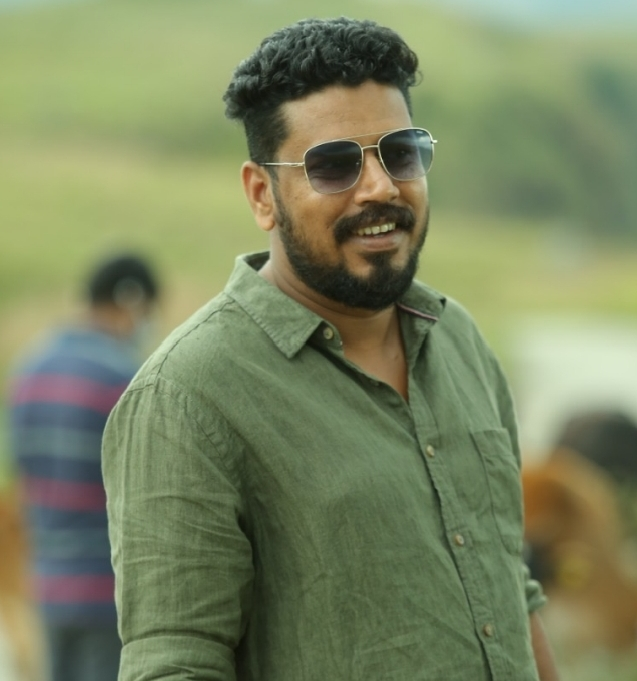
- Nisar Rahmath in 2025
- Born: Mannarkkad, Kerala
- Occupation: Costume designer
- Years active: 2008-present
- Awards: Kerala State Film Award for Best Costume Designer (2015)

Nisar Rahmath is an Indian costume designer working in the Malayalam film industry. He received the Kerala State Film Award for Best Costume Designer in 2015 for his work in Jo and the Boy.

== Career ==
Nisar Rahmath, originally from Mannarkkad, began his professional journey as a tailor before entering the film industry. His first full-time work in costume design was as an assistant on the 2010 film Kadaksham, under designer S.B. Satheeshan. He went on to work as a costume assistant in around 40 films.

He debuted as an independent costume designer with the 2015 Malayalam film Jo and the Boy. His work in the film earned him the Kerala State Film Award for Best Costume Designer.

Nisar later worked on films such as Avarude Raavukal (2017), where he created distinctive looks for each lead character.

In recent years, Nisar designed costumes for several notable productions including Kappela(2020), the award-winning drama Aattam (2023), the web series Nagendran's Honeymoons (2024), and the action film Mura (2024).

== Recognition ==
Nisar received the Kerala State Film Award for Best Costume Designer in 2015 for Jo and the Boy.

JC Daniel Foundation Film Award for Best Costume Designer in 2024 for Mura.

== Filmography ==
Year	Title	Director	Notes	Ref
2015	Jo and the Boy	Rojin Thomas	Debut as costume designer	
2017	Georgettan's Pooram	K. Biju		
2017	Munthirivallikal Thalirkkumbol	Jibu Jacob		
2017	Avarude Raavukal	Shanil Muhammed		
2018	Kuttanpillayude Sivarathri	Jean Markose		
2018	Thanaha	Prakash Kunjhan Moorayil		
2018	Vikadakumaran	Boban Samuel		
2019	Thottappan	Shanavas K Bavakutty		
2019	Kalikkoottukar	P.K. Baaburaj		
2019	Jimmy Ee Veedinte Aishwaryam	Raju Chandra		
2020	Kappela	Muhammad Musthafa		
2021	Kaaval	Nithin Renji Panicker		
2021	Ellam Sheriyakum	Jibu Jacob		
2022	Kochaal	Shyam Mohan		
2022	Aviyal	Shanil Muhammed		
2022	Mei Hoom Moosa	Jibu Jacob		
2022	Autorickshawkarante Bharya	Harikumar		
2023	Aattam	Anand Ekarshi		
2023	Higuita	Hemanth G Nair		
2023	Kunjamminis Hospital	Sanal V. Devan		
2023	Tha Thavalayude Tha	Francis Joseph Jeera		
2024	Nagendran's Honeymoons (Web Series)	Nithin Renji Panicker	6 episodes	
2024	Kondal	Ajith Mampally		
2024	Cup	Sanal V. Devan		
2024	Mura	Muhammad Musthafa		
2025	Detective Ujjwalan	Indraneel GK and Rahul G		
2025	Varaaham	Sanal Devan		
