= Vishnu Narayanan =

Indian cinematographer

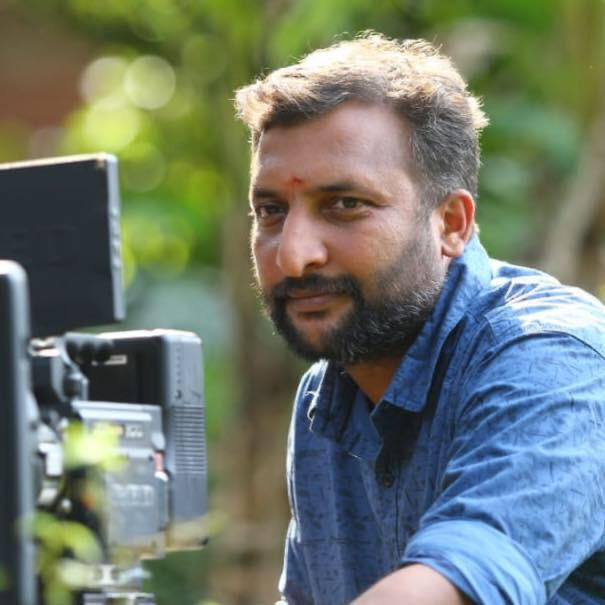
- Occupation: Cinematographer
- Years active: 2012–present

Vishnu Narayanan is an Indian cinematographer who works in Malayalam cinema, making his debut in 2012 with Asuravithu. Vishnu has collaborated with director Ranjith Sankar on Punyalan Private Limited (2017), Njan Marykutty (2018), and Pretham 2 (2018). His other notable films include Vellimoonga (2014), Aadu (2015), its sequel Aadu 2 (2017), Malikappuram (2022), and Anand Sreebala (2024).

== Filmography ==
Year	Title	Director	Ref.
2012	Asuravithu	A. K. Sajan	
2012	Simhasanam	Shaji Kailas	
2013	Zachariayude Garbhinikal	Aneesh Anwar	
2013	Mannar Mathai Speaking 2	Mamas K. Chandran	
2014	Vellimoonga	Jibu Jacob	
2015	Aadu	Midhun Manuel Thomas	
2015	KL 10 Patthu	Muhsin Parari	
2015	Urumbukal Urangarilla	Jiju Asokan	
2017	Avarude Raavukal	Shanil Muhammed	
2017	Punyalan Private Limited	Ranjith Sankar	
2017	Aadu 2	Midhun Manuel Thomas	
2018	Njan Marykutty	Ranjith Sankar	
2018	Pretham 2	Ranjith Sankar	
2019	Janamaithri	John Manthrickal	
2021	Oru Thathvika Avalokanam	Akhil Marar	
2021	Aanu	Sidhartha Siva	
2022	Mei Hoom Moosa	Jibu Jacob	
2022	Malikappuram	Vishnu Sasi Shankar	
2023	Boomerang	Manu Sudhakaran	
2024	Raastha	Aneesh Anwar	
2024	Ethire	Amal K Joby	
2024	Anand Sreebala	Vishnu Vinay	
"TBA"	Thanara	Haridas	
