= 44th Kerala State Film Awards =

Annual Indian film awards ceremony

- Awarded for: Best of Malayalam Cinema in 2013
- Date: 19 April 2014
- Location: Thiruvananthapuram
- Country: India
- Presented by: Kerala State Chalachitra Academy
- First award: 1969
- Website: http://www.keralafilm.com

The 44th Kerala State Film Awards, recognizing excellence in Malayalam cinema, were announced by Cinema Minister Thiruvanchoor Radhakrishnan on 19 April 2014.

== Superlatives ==
In the 45th Kerala State Film Awards, 85 films were considered and Ayaal won the maximum number of awards (5) followed by Zachariayude Garbhinikal (4).

== Winners ==
Most Awards

Number of Awards	Films
5	Ayaal
4	Zachariayude Garbhinikal
3	Artist, Nadan, Kanyaka Talkies

Name of Award	Awardee(s)	Name of Film	Remarks
Best Film	Sudevan; V. Achyuthanandan (Pace Trust)	CR No: 89	
Second Best Film	Anil Radhakrishnan Menon; Mukesh R. Mehta (E 4 Entertainment)	North 24 Kaatham	
Best Director	Shyamaprasad	Artist	
Best Film with Popular Appeal and Aesthetic Value	Jeethu Joseph; Antony Perumbavoor (Aashirvad Cinemas)	Drishyam	
Best Children's Film	Rojin Thomas, Shanil Muhammed; Vijay Babu, Sandra Thomas (Friday Film House)	Philips and the Monkey Pen	
Best Actor	Fahadh Faasil	Artist, North 24 Kaatham	
Best Actor	Lal	Ayaal, Zachariayude Garbhinikal	
Best Actress	Ann Augustine	Artist	
Second Best Actor	Ashok Kumar	CR No: 89	
Second Best Actress	Lena	Left Right Left, Kanyaka Talkies	
Best Child Artist	Baby Anikha	5 Sundarikal – Segment: Sethulakshmi	
Best Child Artist	Master Sanoop Santhosh	Philips and the Monkey Pen	
Best Comedian	Suraj Venjaramoodu	Daivathinte Swantham Cleetus, Pullipulikalum Aattinkuttiyum	
Best Debut Director	K. R. Manoj	Kanyaka Talkies	
Best Children's Film Director	Rojin Thomas, Shanil Muhammed	Philips and the Monkey Pen	
Best Cinematography	Sujith Vasudev	Ayaal, Memories	
Best Story	Aneesh Anwar	Zachariayude Garbhinikal	
Best Screenplay	Bobby–Sanjay	Mumbai Police	
Best Lyrics	Prabha Varma; Dr. Madhu Vasudevan	Nadan	"Ethu Sundara Swapna Yavanika" "Ottakku Paadunna Poonkuyile"
Best Music Director	Ouseppachan	Nadan	"Ottakku Paadunna Poonkuyile" "Ethu Sundara Swapna Yavanika"
Best Background Music	Bijibal	Balyakalasakhi	
Best Male Singer	Pradeep Chandrakumar	Orissa	"Janmantharangalil Nee En"
Best Female Singer	Vaikom Vijayalakshmi	Nadan	"Ottakku Paadunna Poonkuyile"
Best Dubbing Artist	Ambootti	Vasanthathinte Kanal Vazhikalil	for giving voice to Samuthirakani
Best Dubbing Artist	Sreeja Ravi	Ayaal	for giving voice to Iniya
Best Choreography	Kumar Shanthi	Orissa	
Best Costume Designer	Siji Thomas Nobel	Amen	
Best Makeup Artist	Pattanam Rasheed	Swapaanam	
Best Colourist	Raghu Raman, Riya Digital Solutions	Ayaal	
Best Film Editor	K. Rajagopal	Oru Indian Pranayakadha	
Best Sound Recordist	Harikumar Madhavan Nair	Kanyaka Talkies	Location Sound
Best Sound Recordist	Rajeevan Ayyappan	Kanyaka Talkies	Sound Design
Best Sound Recordist	N. Harikumar	Kanyaka Talkies	Sound Mixing
Best Art Director	M. Bawa	Amen	
Special Jury Award	Aneesh Anwar	Zachariayude Garbhinikal	Direction
Special Jury Award	Mridula Warrier	Kalimannu	Song "Lalee Lalee"
Special Mention	Afzal Yusuf	Immanuel, God for Sale	Music Direction
Special Mention	Kalabhavan Shajon	Drishyam	Acting
Special Mention	Sanusha	Zachariayude Garbhinikal	Acting
Special Mention	Suresh Unnithan	Ayaal	Direction
Best Book on Cinema	S. Jayachandran Nair	Kazhchayude Sathyam	
Best Book on Cinema	Vijayakrishnan	Indian Cinemayude 100 Varshangal	
Best Article on Cinema	V. Vijayakumar	Charithrathe Chalachithramakkiya Master	
Best Article on Cinema	I. Shanmukhadas	Daiva Narthakante Krodham	
J. C. Daniel Award (Lifetime Achievement Award)	M. T. Vasudevan Nair		

== See also ==
- 61st National Film Awards
