= Prejish Prakash =

Malayalam film editor

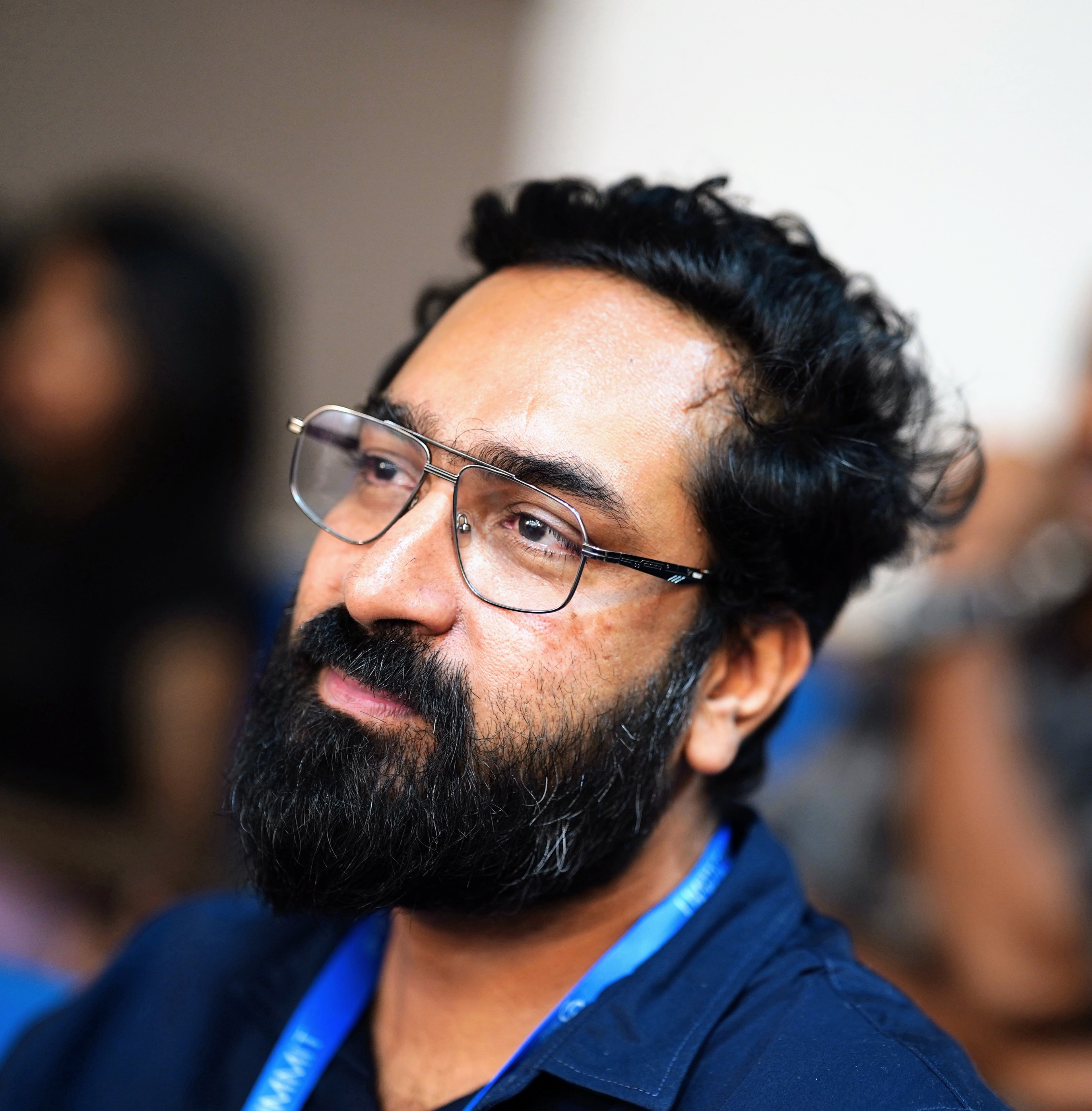
- Born: 24 February 1986 (age 40)
- Occupations: Film Editor; Entrepreneur
- Years active: 2009–present
- Spouse: Diana Prejish
- Children: 2

Prejish Prakash is an Indian film editor and entrepreneur known for his contributions to Malayalam cinema. He is best known for editing the National Award-winning film Home (2021 film), for which he received the Kerala Film Critics Association Awards for Best Editor. He is the founder of Peppino Studios and School of Editing, based in Kochi, Kerala.

== Early life and education ==
Prejish Prakash completed his schooling at Mount Bethany EHSS. He graduated with a degree in Multimedia from St. Joseph College of Communication in 2007.

== Editing career ==
Prejish Prakash began his professional career as a video editor with Yes Indiavision Satellite Communications in 2008. He later worked as a freelance editor on film trailers, advertisement films, short films, music videos, television programmes, and other video productions. He subsequently worked as an associate editor on several feature films before making his debut as an independent film editor withMullassery Madhavan Kutty Nemom P. O. in 2012.

He gained wider recognition with Philips and the Monkey Pen a Malayalam children's film directed by Rojin Thomas & Shanil Muhammed. The film was a commercial success and received several accolades, including the Kerala State Film Award for Best Children's Film, Kerala State Film Award for Best Child Artist and Kerala State Film Award for Best Children's Film Director.

In 2021, Prejish edited Home (2021 film) directed by Rojin Thomas. The film won the National Film Award for Best Feature Film in Malayalam while Prejish received the Kerala Film Critics Association Awards for Best Editor for his work on the film.

== Entrepreneurship ==
Prejish founded Peppino Studios and School of Editing in 2015. Peppino Studios is a post-production and creative media company that provides editing and digital media services. School of Editing, based in Kochi, Kerala, offers professional training in film and video editing.

== Filmography ==
=== Film Editor ===
Year	Film	Language	Director	Release date / Notes
2012	Mullassery Madhavan Kutty Nemom P. O.	Malayalam	Kumar Nanda	10 February 2012
2013	Philips and the Monkey Pen	Malayalam	Rojin Thomas and Shanil Muhammed	7 November 2013
2013	Vedivazhipadu	Malayalam	Shambhu Purushothaman	12 December 2013
2014	Raktharakshassu 3D	Malayalam	R Factor	28 February 2014
2014	1 by Two	Malayalam	Arun Kumar Aravind	19 April 2014
2017	Avarude Raavukal	Malayalam	Shanil Muhammed	23 June 2017
2020	Kilometers and Kilometers	Malayalam	Jeo Baby	31 August
2021	Home (2021 film)	Malayalam	Rojin Thomas	Released on Amazon Prime Video on 19 August 2021
2024	Checkmate	Malayalam	Ratish Sekhar	9 August 2024

=== Documentary editor ===
He edited the documentary "After Life" directed by Sanjeev Sivan, which was based on a real-life incident of a couple of Kerala fighting a legal battle to get access to their dead son's semen in hopes of producing an heir.

"Water Whatever" is another Documentary Film edited by Prejish which has become an official selection of the Stockholm Project Green festival is one of only seven films selected worldwide by festival co-hosts Nomad Films (US) and Sweden's GAP (Global Action Plan) The 35mm film recounts 3 stories based on a single theme, water scarcity. Directed by Sudip Joshiy, Shot in Ladakh, Rajasthan and Kerala by renowned cinematographer Amal Neerad

== Awards ==
Year	Award	Film
2021	Kerala Film Critics Association Awards	Home (2021 film) Best Editor
