= Kerala Film Critics Association Award for Best Popular Film =

Annual Indian film award

The Kerala Film Critics Association Award for Best Popular Film is an award presented annually at the Kerala Film Critics Association Awards of India to the most popular film in Malayalam. It was first awarded as a special prize in 1991. It has been a largely regular category at the annual awards since 2002.

== Winners ==
Year	Film	Director	Ref.
1991	Kilukkam	Priyadarshan	
1995	Mannar Mathai Speaking	Siddique–Lal	
1996	Sallapam	Sundar Das	
1997	Aniyathipravu	Fazil	
1998	Chinthavishtayaya Shyamala	Sreenivasan	
1999	Vasanthiyum Lakshmiyum Pinne Njanum	Vinayan	
2000	Narasimham	Shaji Kailas	
2001	Ravanaparabhu	Ranjith	
2002	Meesa Madhavan	Lal Jose	
2003	Balettan	V. M. Vinu	
2006	Classmates	Lal Jose	
2006	Rasathanthram	Sathyan Anthikad	
2008	Twenty:20	Joshiy	
2009	Neelathamara	Lal Jose	
2009	Passenger	Ranjith Sankar	
2010	Shikkar	M. Padmakumar	
2011	Indian Rupee	Ranjith	
2012	Ayalum Njanum Thammil	Lal Jose	
2013	Amen	Lijo Jose Pellissery	
2014	Vellimoonga	Jibu Jacob	
2015	Charlie	Martin Prakkat	
2015	Oru Vadakkan Selfie	G. Prajith	
2016	Pulimurugan	Vysakh	
2017	Ramaleela	Arun Gopy	
2019	Thanneer Mathan Dinangal	Girish A.D	
2020	Sufiyum Sujatayum	Naranipuzha Shanavas	
2021	Hridayam	Vineeth Sreenivasan	
2022	Nna Thaan Case Kodu	Ratheesh Balakrishnan Poduval	
2022	Malikappuram	Vishnu Sasi Shankar	

== See also ==
- Kerala Film Critics Association Award for Best Film
- Kerala Film Critics Association Award for Second Best Film
- Kerala State Film Award for Best Popular Film
