= V. J. James =

Indian author

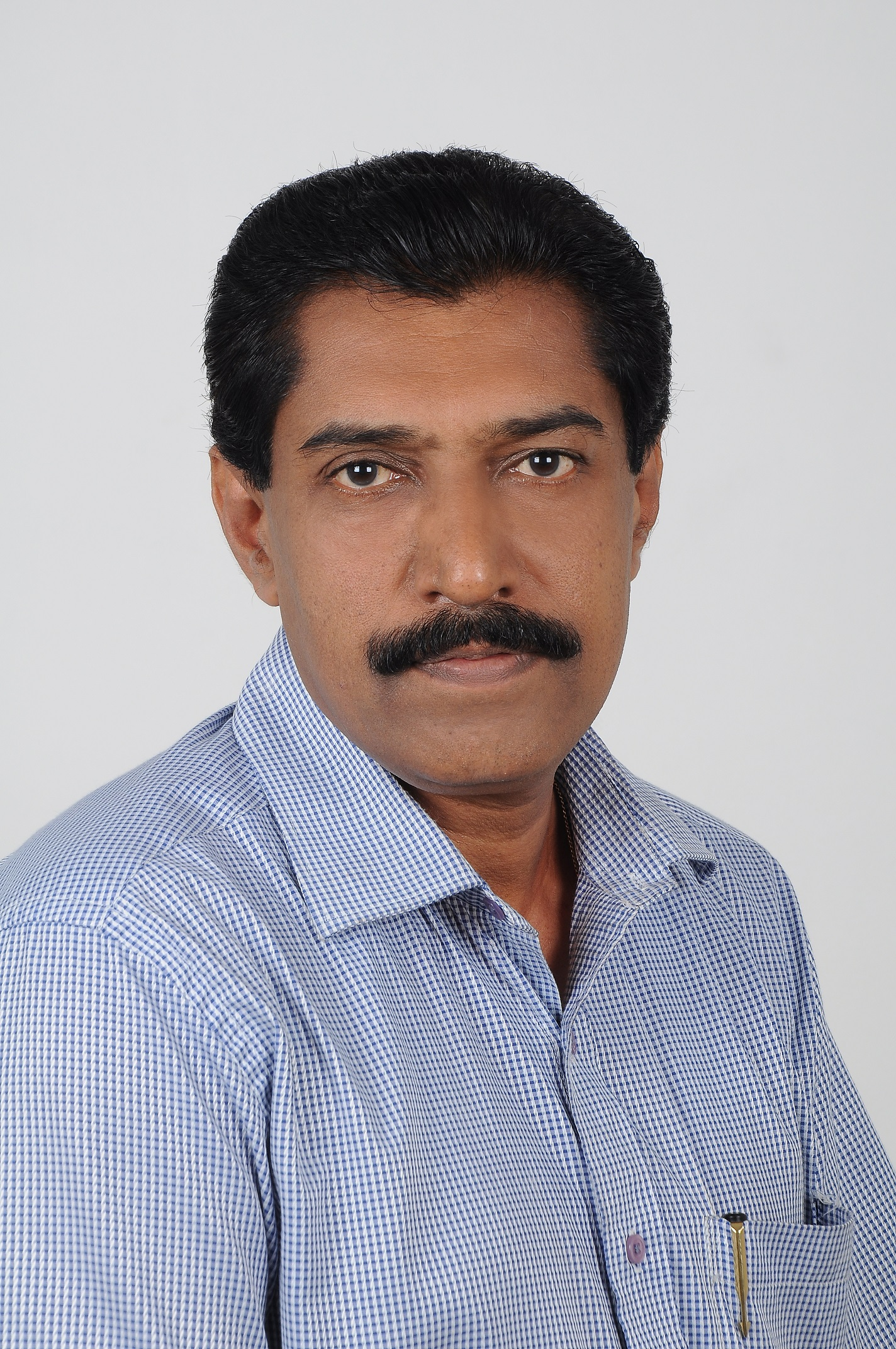
- Born: Vazhappally, Changanassery, Kottayam, Kerala, India
- Occupations: Writer, engineer
- Writing career
- Language: Malayalam
- Notable works: Purappadinte Pusthakam; Dathapaharam; Nireeshwaran; Pranayopanishath; Anticlock; Chorasasthram; Leika; Ottakkalan kakka
- Notable awards: 1999 DC Silver Jubilee Award; 1999 Malayattoor Award; Thoppil Ravi Award; 2015 Kerala Bhasha Institute Basheer Puraskaram; 2017 Kerala Sahitya Akademi Award for Novel; 2018 Thikkurissi Award; 2019 Vayalar Award

V. J. James is an Indian writer who primarily writes in Malayalam language. His first book, Purapaadinte Pusthakam, was published by DC Books as the winning work in the novel competition conducted as a part of its 25th anniversary celebration in 1999. His novel Nireeshwaran, which explores the clashes between theism and atheism, won several awards including the Kerala Sahitya Akademi Award and Vayalar Award.

== Life ==
V. J. James was born in Changanassery, Kottayam, Kerala, India. He attended St. Theresa's Higher Secondary School, Vazhappally and St. Mary's Higher Secondary School, Champakulam, before studying at St. Berchmans College, Changanacherry. He has a bachelor's degree in mechanical engineering from Mar Athanasius College of Engineering. An engineer by profession, he worked at the Vikram Sarabhai Space Centre, Thiruvananthapuram.

== Awards ==
- DC Silver Jubilee Award
- Malayattoor Prize (1999),
- Rotary Literary Award for Purappadinte Pusthakam
- Thoppil Ravi Award for Nireeshwaran
- Kerala Bhasha Institute Basheer Award (2015) for Nireeshwaran
- Kerala Sahitya academy (2017) for Nireeshwaran
- Basheer Puraskaram (2018) for Nireeshwaran
- Thikkurissi award (2018) for Anticlock
- O.V.Vijayan Award (2019) for Anticlock
- Vayalar Award (2019) for Nireeshwaran
- Shortlisted for the JCB Prize 2021 : Anti-Clock (Translated by Ministhy S)
- Shortlisted for Atta Galatta-Banglore Literature Festival Book Prize 2021 : Chorashasathram (Translated by Morley J Nair)
- Longlisted for the PFC VoW Book Award 2022 : Anti-Clock (Translated by Ministhy S)
- Malayatoor Foundation Literary Award (2022) for Anticlock
- Padmarajan Award (2022) for Velli Kash
- FOKANA Award for Literature 2023.
- Pravasi Kairali Sahitya Paraskaram2023
- IC Chacko Award 2025

== Writing ==
V. J. James has said that he observes everyday life closely, as it "helps him to narrate common man's life with authenticity". His novels are known for explaining serious subjects in simple language.

== Published works ==
=== Novels ===
- 1999 - Purappadinte Pusthakam (പുറപ്പാടിന്റെ പുസ്തകം)
- 2002 - Chorashasthram (ചോരശാസ്ത്രം)
- 2005 - Dathapaharam (ദത്താപഹാരം)
- 2006 - Leyka (ലെയ്ക)
- 2013 - Ottakkaalan Kakka (ഒറ്റക്കാലൻ കാക്ക)
- 2014 - Nireeshwaran (നിരീശ്വരൻ)
- 2018 - Anticlock (ആന്റിക്ലോക്ക്)

=== Short story collections ===
- Shavangalil Pathinaraman (ശവങ്ങളിൽ പതിനാറാമൻ)
- Bhoomiyilekkulla thurumbicha Vathayanangal (ഭൂമിയിലേക്കുള്ള തുരുമ്പിച്ച വാതായനങ്ങൾ)
- Vyakulamathavinte Kannadikkoodu (വ്യാകുലമാതാവിന്റെ കണ്ണാടിക്കൂട്)
- Pranayopanishath (പ്രണയോപനിഷത്ത്)
- VJ James kathakal (കഥകൾ – വി ജെ ജയിംസ്)
- Katha (കഥ)
- B Nilavara (ബി നിലവറ)
- White Sound (വൈറ്റ് സൗണ്ട്)

Munthirivallikal Thalirkkumbol, a 2017 Malayalam family drama film directed by Jibu Jacob, written by Sindhu Raj, and starring Mohanlal and Meena, is loosely based on James' Malayalam short story Pranayopanishath (പ്രണയോപനിഷത്ത്).

Children's literature

Kinnaram (കിന്നരം)

=== English Translations (Novels) ===
- 2021 - ANTI-CLOCK (Penguin Publishers)
- 2022 - NIREESWARAN (Penguin Publishers)
- 2022 - CHORASHASTRA :THE SUBTLE SCIENCE OF THIEVERY (Penguin Publishers)
- 2023 - DATAPAHARAM :CALL OF THE FOREST (Penguin Publishers)
- 2024 THE BOOK OF EXODUS (Penguin Publishers)
