= Arun Alat =

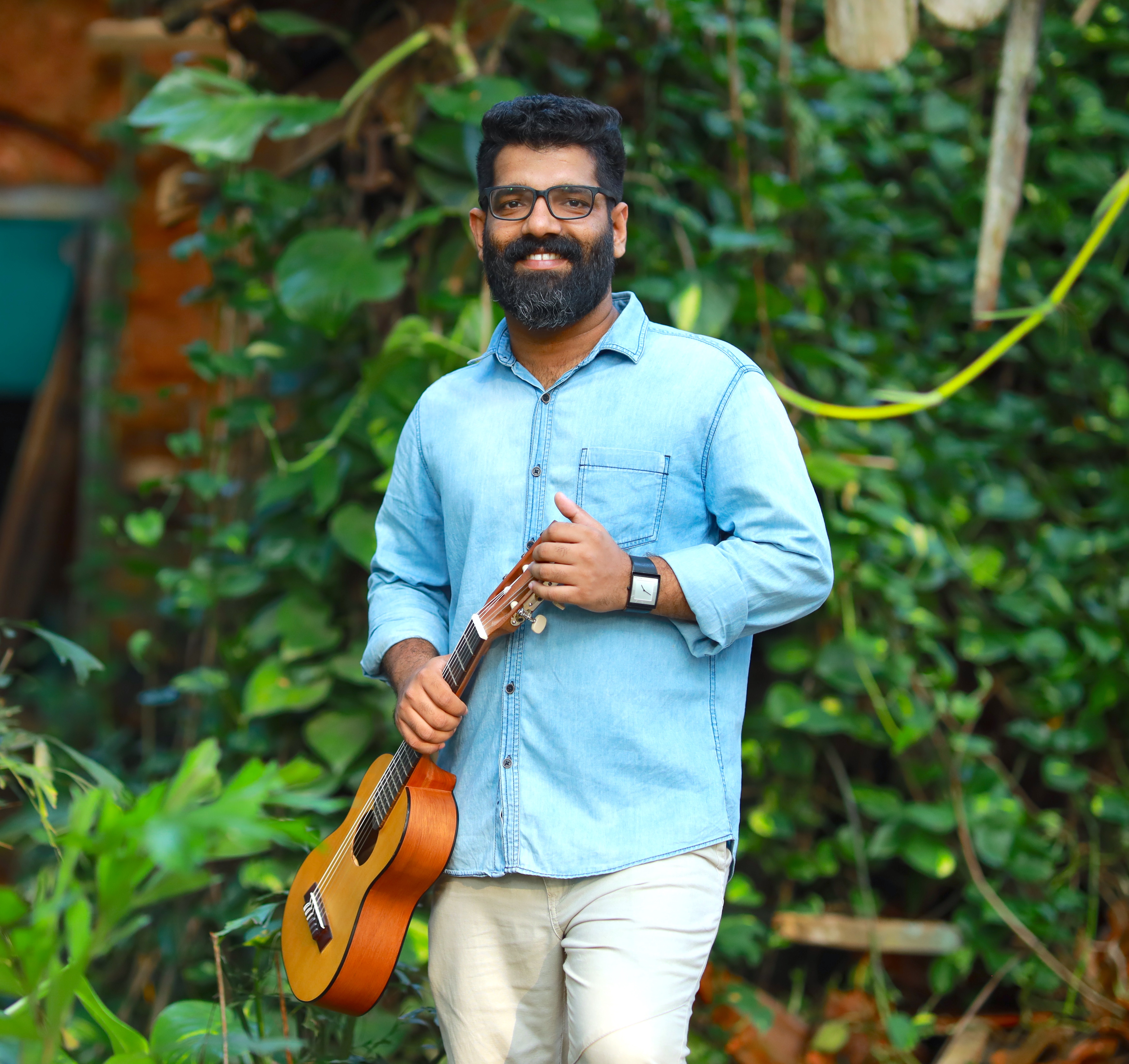

Background information
- Born: 6 October 1988 (age 37); Pilicode, Kasargod, Kerala, India
- Occupations: Singer; Lyricist; Guitarist; Composer
- Instruments: Guitar, vocals
- Years active: 2010–present

Arun Alat (born 6 October 1988) is an Indian playback singer, music composer and lyricist who made a space in Malayalam film industry as a singer with his debut song "Swapnamoru Chaakku" from the 2010 film Best Actor.

== Musical career ==
In 2010, soon after completing his Btech in Civil engineering at Mar Athanasius College of Engineering, Kothamangalam, He got into playback singing. National award-winning music director Bijibal introduced him through the song 'Swapnamoru Chakku'. After that He has been collaborating with many leading musicians in Malayalam for different film and non-film projects.

Arun Alat had worked as a Civil Engineer in an Architectural-Structural-project management company in Kochi [FormsIndia] for more than two years during the initial stage of his music career. In 2013, he left his engineering job aside to concentrate fully on his music projects.

== Discography ==
=== As singer ===
Year	Song	Film	Music director
2010	Swapnamoru chakku	Best Actor (film)	Bijibal
2011	Vinnin nenjil	Kadhayile Nayika	Thej Mervin
2011	Kaaalamonnu kaalal	Sevenes	Bijibal
2011	Kallippenne	Innanu Aa Kalyanam	Bijibal
2012	Namosthuthe	Thattathin Marayathu	Shaan Rahman
2012	Aakasham	Scene Onnu Nammude Veedu	Ratheesh Vegha
2013	Naatiloru koottam	Isaac Newton S/O Philipose	Bijibal
2013	Kunjaruvikal	Lokpal	Ratheesh Vegha
2013	Vayyente Shivane	God for Sale	Afsal Yusuf
2013	Vinnile Thaarakam	Philips and the Monkey Pen	Rahul subrahmanian
2013	Eesho	Punyalan Agarbattis	Bijibal
2014	MaGoBa	Mannar Mathai Speaking 2	Rahul Raj
2014	Kadha Parayana	On the Way	Sejo John
2014	Thaj Theerthoru	Monaayi Angane Aanaayi	Vinu Uday
2014	Akkare Akkare	Vazhiyariyaathe	Sai Balan
2014	Thaadi Paaattu	Tamaar Padaar	Bijibal
2014	Thammil Thammil	Mylanchi Monchulla Veedu	Afsal Yusuf
2015	Neelambalin	Oru Vadakkan Selfie	Shaan Rahman
2015	Haritha Nibida	Aadu	Shaan Rahman
2015	Azhakee	Wonderful Journey	S.P Varma
2015	Kaavaalam	ATM	Antony John
2015	Pinjomal	Jo and the Boy	Rahul Subrahmanian
2015	Marutha Song	Adi Kapyare Kootamani	Shaan Rahman
2015	Ente Maavum Poothe	Adi Kapyare Kootamani	Shaan Rahman
2016	Maayum Sandhye	AakashVaani	Rahul Subrahmanian
2016	Vayya Vayya Vayya	Ithu Thaanda Police	Sumesh Parameshwar
2016	Theeram	0-41*	Abhijith Unni
2016	Ulakathin	Karinkunnam 6'S	Rahul Raj
2016	Innaleyum	Kavi Uddheshichathu	Vinu Thomas
2016	Pokkuveyiline	Swarna Kaduva	Ratheesh Vegha
2017	Puthen Sooryan	Aby (film)	Bijibal
2017	Vaadathe Vezhathe	Avarude Raavukal	Shankar Sharma
2017	20 20 song	Rakshadhikari Baiju Oppu	Bijibal
2017	Chirakukalaayi	Oru Cinemakkaran	Bijibal
2017	Nenje Nenje	Kadam kadha	Deepankuran Kaithapram
2017	Aarini	Paippin Chuvattile Pranayam	Bijibal
2019	Aalam Niranjulla	Neeyum Njanum	Vinu Thomas
2019	Summa Summa	Maanasi (Tamil)	Shivram
2019	Ini raavum pakalum	Safe	Rahul Subrahmanian
2021	Itha Vazhimaari odunnu	Home (2021 film)	Rahul Subrahmanian
2022	En Kanavil	4 Years (film)	Sankar Sharma
2024	Ullamarinjavale	Turkish Tharkam	Ifthi

=== As lyricist ===
Year	Song	Film
2019	"Ee Veyil"	Safe
2021	"Mukilu Thodanai"	Home
2021	"Onnunarnnu"	Home
2022	"Pokam"	Shyam Singha Roy
2022	"Darshana"	Hridayam
2022	"Arike Ninna"	Hridayam
2022	"Sarvam Sadha"	Hridayam
2022	"Pen poove Then vande"	Sita Ramam
2022	"Kannil Kannil"	Sita Ramam
2022	"Oru kayarike"	Sita Ramam
2022	"Na dhir dhi"	Sita Ramam
2022	"Oru yugam"	Sita Ramam
2022	"Na Na Na"	Mike
2023	"Raave"	Thaaram Theertha Koodaram
2023	"En Roja Neeye"	Kushi (2023 film)
2023	"Aradhya"	Kushi (2023 film)
2024	"Mizhideepame"	Lucky Baskhar - (D)

=== As Composer ===
Year	Project	Project Category	Director
2021	Dreaming of Words	Documentary	Nandan

=== Indie Music ===
Year	Song	Artists featured	Language
2020	Thalolam	Sathyabhama	Malayalam
2021	Nava Malayalam	Arun Alat, Bhadra Rajin	Malayalam
2022	Deshadanam (#1MinMusic)	Arun Alat	Malayalam
2021	Premam (#1MinMusic)	Arun Alat	Malayalam
