= Munthirivallikal Thalirkkumbol =

2016 film by Jibu Jacob

- Theatrical release poster
- Directed by: Jibu Jacob
- Screenplay by: M. Sindhuraj
- Based on: Pranayopanishath by V. J. James
- Produced by: Sophia Paul
- Starring: Mohanlal; Meena
- Cinematography: Pramod K. Pillai
- Edited by: Sooraj E. S.
- Music by: Bijibal; M. Jayachandran
- Production company: Weekend Blockbusters
- Distributed by: Weekend Blockbusters
- Release date: 20 January 2017 (India)
- Running time: 155 minutes
- Country: India
- Language: Malayalam
- Box office: ₹50 crores

Munthirivallikal Thalirkkumbol (transl. When the grapevines sprout) is a 2017 Indian Malayalam-language domestic drama film directed by Jibu Jacob and written by M. Sindhuraj. It is loosely based on the Malayalam short story "Pranayopanishath" by V. J. James. Produced and distributed by Sophia Paul through Weekend Blockbusters, the film stars Mohanlal and Meena as panchayat secretary Ulahannan and his wife Annyamma. The soundtrack features songs composed by Bijibal and M. Jayachandran, and a film score by Bijibal. The film is about Ulahannan, a man having a midlife crisis, who rediscovers himself and overcomes boredom in his routine life.

Sindhuraj obtained the rights to adapt "Pranayopanishath" from James after it was first published in a Malayalam weekly. He developed a new story by setting it in a different background and adding additional characters, and by incorporating his own novelette Schoolilekku Poya Penkutty. In 2015, Paul was looking for a story for a film she was planning with Mohanlal in the lead role, and greenlit Sindhuraj's story. He began writing the screenplay that year and, Jacob was later hired to direct the film. Principal photography began on 15 July 2016 in Kozhikode, Kerala, where over eighty percent of the film was shot. Additional scenes were filmed at locations in Alappuzha; filming ended in Shimla in October.

Munthirivallikal Thalirkkumbol was scheduled to be released in India on 22 December 2016 during Christmas. Its release was delayed due to a strike in the Malayalam film industry, which halted the screening of Malayalam films in Kerala. The film's opening date was rescheduled, and it was released in India on 20 January 2017. It was well received at the box office, and Mohanlal received the National Film Award – Special Jury Award for his performance in the film.

== Plot ==
Ulahannan "Unnachan", a middle-aged secretary in Keezhattur panchayat, is bored with his monotonous life and no longer cares for his wife Annyamma. She feels the same and no longer shares his bed. Ulahannan's routine includes dozing on the bus ride to his office, where there are only loafers sitting around. He often encounters Lillykutty who flirts with him. Every night at home he sits on the terrace drinking alcohol with his neighbours—Venukuttan, Jacobettan, Monai, and Benny.

At the insistence of an old friend, Ulahannan attends his college alumni reunion, where he meets his ex-lover Indulekha. They recall their past college life when Ulahannan was a firebrand activist. Indulekha, finds it hard to recognize the old Ulahannan, and learns of his humdrum life and his unhappiness. Before he leaves, Indulekha advises him to reinvigorate himself. He decides to redeem his life with love, and seeks the help of Venukuttan, a philanderer, who deceives his wife into thinking he is a loving husband. Venukuttan promises to introduce him to some of his girlfriends and teach him some of his tricks.

In the meantime, he meets Julie, a seductive NRI girl at his office, and begins a relationship with her by messaging and calling every day. Venukuttan is envious as he finds Julie more attractive than any of his paramours. When her husband Augustine shows up, Ulahannan becomes nervous over his tryst with Julie. He learns that Julie is a flirt herself, and he is only one of the men she is contacting.

The next night, while drinking alcohol, Venukuttan teases Ulahannan that his relationship with Julie is in vain. Provoked, Ulahannan challenges him to call one of his girlfriends and gave the phone to him when she answers. After hesitating, Venukuttan makes the call. Ulahannan speaks in a romantic voice, and the woman asks if it is Ulahannan calling. Shocked, he realizes it is Annyamma on the line. He is furious and starts shouting at Venukuttan. A man with an attractive voice named Jacobettan comes on the line. He is watching a video of a recorded song, and Annyamma is singing in her kitchen. Jacobettan tells him that Annyamma is helping the kids with the songs for the annual gathering program of the colony members. Ulahannan is surprised as he has forgotten that Annyamma can sing. This reminds him of the young Annyamma.

The next morning, a disguised Ulahannan secretly goes to church to make an offering to God he promised when he was in trouble over Julie. After the prayer, Ulahannan smells his favourite woman's perfume. He cannot see her face as she is hooded with her sari. He tells Jacobettan how attractive she is and asks if he can see her. While walking away, someone calls her, she turns and Ulahannan can see the woman is Annyamma. He realizes he has a beautiful wife and that he has not bothered about her for a long time.

Late one day, Annyamma finds a gift in Jini's wardrobe. She tells Ulahannan about the gift and about recent changes in Jini's behaviour. He says that asking for more information about the gift will affect Jini's studies. Ulahannan and Annyamma ask Jini's school friend and learn Jini is close to a man who was introduced to her by mutual friends. Ulahannan and Annyamma's fear over him grows daily. One day Ulahannan waits in front of Jini's school and sees her going to a hotel on her bicycle. Disguised, he sits in the hotel and hears his daughter break up with her boyfriend saying that now is the time to study, and she will have enough time for love after marriage. Ulahannan hugs his daughter and says that he is not worried about her behavior. Jini says that her boyfriend does not know how to love like her father. That night Ulahannan tells Annyamma about the incident and promises to take the family to a vineyard to see the grapevines sprout. The film ends with Annyamma taking responsibility for their daughter's mistake, realising that children should grow up seeing their parents love and affection.

== Cast ==
- Mohanlal as Ulahannan "Unnachan"
- Meena as Annyamma "Aamy"
- Aima Rosmy Sebastian as Jini Ulahannan
- Sanoop Santhosh as Jerry Ulahannan
- Anoop Menon as Venukuttan
- Srinda Arhaan as Latha, Venukuttan's wife
- Neha Saxena as Julie Augustine Karukapally
- Alencier Ley Lopez as Jacob "Jacobettan", Telecom operator, Ulahannan's friend
- Kalabhavan Shajohn as Monai
- Reshmi Boban as Alice
- Bindu Panicker as Girija
- Lishoy as Dasan
- Suraj Venjaramoodu as Thilothaman
- Sudheer Karamana as Chalakan
- Sharaf U Dheen as Reji
- Manju Pathrose as Lillykutty
- Rajesh Paravoor as Benny
- Suresh Krishna as Augustine, Julie's spouse
- Rahul Madhav as Josemon, Younger brother of Annyamma
- Ganapathi as Jithin
- Sohan Seenulal as Babu
- Meghanathan as Prabhakaran
- Joy Mathew as Ulahannan's friend
- K. L. Antony as Ulahannan's father
- Bindu Ramakrishnan as Ulahannan's mother
- Thrissur Elsy as Reethamma
- Leena Antony as Annyamma's mother
- Reena Basheer as Ulahannan's friend
- Revathy Sivakumar as Priya
- Ambika Mohan as Priya's mother
- Asha Sarath as Indulekha (Cameo appearance)
- Nandu as Priya's father (Cameo appearance)
- Sasi Kalinga as Shivan, Venukuttan's uncle (Cameo appearance)

== Production ==
=== Development ===
Mohanlal announced an untitled film through his Facebook page on 26 June 2015, to be produced by Sophia Paul for Weekend Blockbusters, written by M. Sindhuraj, and directed by Jibu Jacob. At that point, the project was in its initial phase of development and the script was incomplete. The screenplay is loosely based on the Malayalam short story '"Pranayopanishath" by V. J. James. According to Sindhuraj he was inspired by the story, but the script is "not a page-to-page adaptation." According to Jacob, only the story's narrative thread has been used. Mohanlal plays a common character — a panchayat secretary named Ulahannan. "Pranayopanishath" tells the story of a middle-aged couple deciding to rekindle their romance after nineteen mundane years of married life.

The film was in development since 2015. Paul had Mohanlal's dates for a project and was looking for a story. After hearing about it, she liked Sindhuraj's story. Mohanlal agreed, and the project was greenlit. Sindhuraj saw a potential film when he first read "Pranayopanishath" and expressed his interest to James in adapting it into a screenplay. He envisioned a new story background, characters and living conditions, and developed it around Ulahannan and Aaniamma's circumstances. He also prepared the story by incorporating his own novelette Schoolilekku Poya Penkutty published in Vanitha. By this time, someone else had bought the film rights from James and drafted a screenplay. Sindhuraj told James that he would step back, but would still like to buy the rights if the other film did not materialise within a given time, which he eventually did. Sindhuraj thought of the film's tagline "My Life is My Wife" during his vacation in Sri Lanka, where he saw it written on an auto rickshaw. Jacob was hired to direct the film after the screenplay was drafted. At first he was not confident about directing the film, but he was moved after reading the short story published in Mathrubhumi Azhchappathippu magazine.

M. Jayachandran and Bijibal were signed as the film's composers, and Pramod K. Pillai as the cinematographer. Bijibal also composed the film's score. The film's title was announced in the middle of filming in September 2016. The title Munthirivallikal Thalirkkumbol (meaning: When the Grape Vines Sprout) was derived from the verses of the Song of Songs (Song of Solomon) in the Hebrew Bible. Paul also cites Padmarajan's 1986 film Namukku Parkkan Munthirithoppukal as an inspiration for the title. In a September 2016 interview, Paul described the film as a "fun-filled family drama," and said they were planning for a late-October release.

=== Casting ===
Ulahannan, the leading character was tailor-made for Mohanlal. As of June 2015, the filmmakers were in the process of casting actors for other roles. For the female lead, Ulahannan's neglected homemaker wife, Sophia Paul wanted "a classy beauty" and Vidya Balan was her first choice. The synopsis impressed Balan, but she could not commit to the film due to scheduling conflicts. In December, Weekend Blockbusters announced that Meena had been signed for the role. She was cast by Jacob, who had initially thought about casting a newcomer, but later felt Meena was the right choice because of her experience and the good chemistry between her and Mohanlal. They had already collaborated on several successful films.

In March 2016, Weekend Blockbusters released a cast list including (apart from Mohanlal and Meena): Biju Menon, Nedumudi Venu, Aju Varghese, Suraj Venjaramoodu, Kalabhavan Shajohn, and Sudheer Karamana. Biju Menon was said to be playing a government employee even though he, Nedumudi Venu and Aju Varghese were not part of the final cast. In June, Aima Rosmy Sebastian was confirmed in the role of Ulahannan's daughter, Jini, a class 12 student. Aju Varghese first informed her of a potential role in the film while they were working on Jacobinte Swargarajyam (2016), and asked her to set aside a few months for it. According to Aima, Jini somewhat resembled her, which helped her portray the role. Ulahannan's son Jerry's casting was yet to be finalised as of June. Finally, Sanoop Santhosh played his seven-year-old son.

In July, additional cast members Anoop Menon, Alencier Ley Lopez, and Srinda Arhaan were confirmed. Alencier plays Jacobettan, who lives in the same neighbourhood of Ulahannan and was to have his own subplot in the film. Anoop Menon plays Venukuttan, a government official, Ulahannan's neighbour and a close confidant; certain of his actions would alter Ulahannan's status quo. The film also revolves around the subplot of Venukuttan and his homemaker wife Latha, played by Arhaan. The couple lives a complete, happy life and shares the neighbourhood with Ulahannan. In August, Rahul Madhav was confirmed to appear in a cameo role as Ulahannan's brother-in-law. Neha Saxena was signed to play Julie, a non-residential Indian girl who becomes a turning-point in Ulahannan's family life. Paul offered her the role after recognising her performance in Kasaba. Sharaf U Dheen was also confirmed in August. Manju Sunil played Sicily, an LD clerk in Ulahannan's office, who has a crush on him. Asha Sarath made a cameo appearance as Indulekha, Joy Mathew and Suresh Krishna also appear in cameo roles.

=== Filming ===
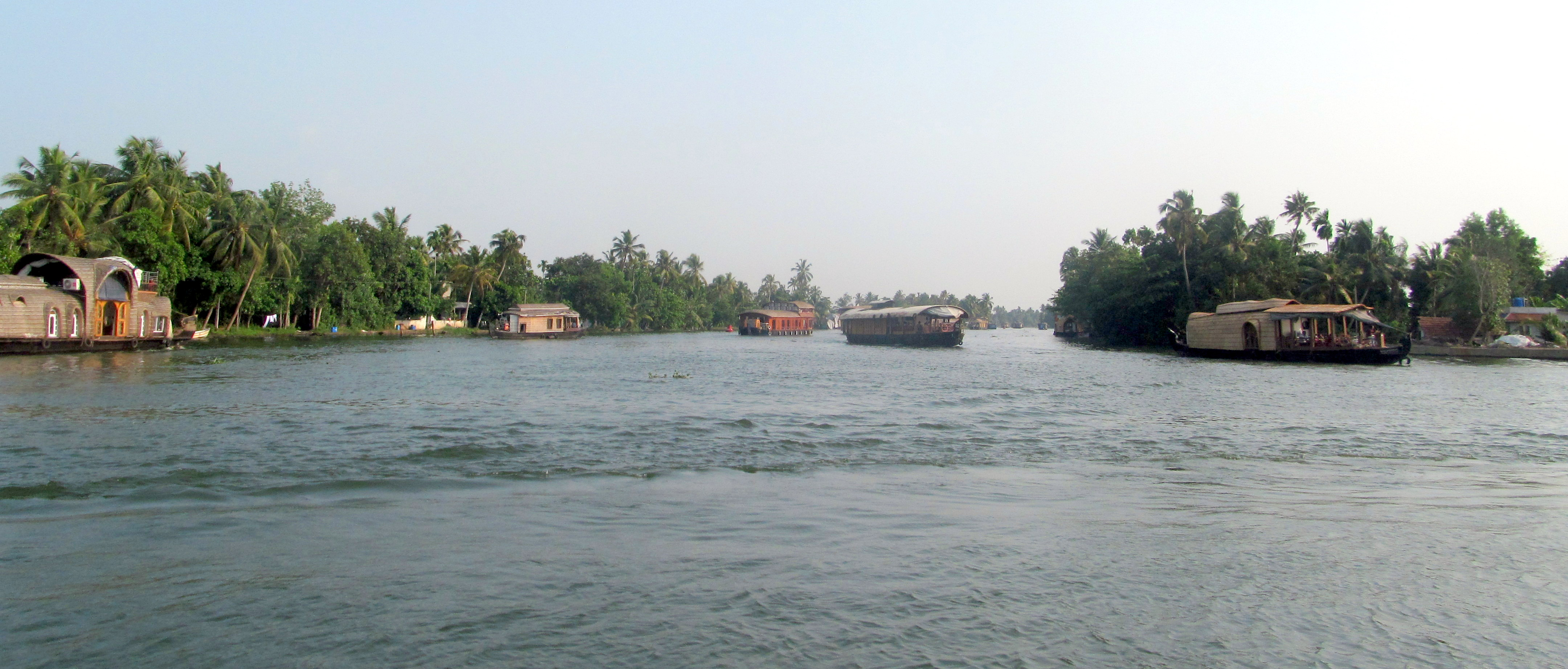
Alappuzha was the location for a song sequence.

The film was planned to start production as soon as the script had been finished. In May 2016, Sindhuraj announced that filming would commence on 20 June, right after Mohanlal completed his work on Oppam. Under the working title Production No:2, principal photography began on 15 July 2016 in Kozhikode, Kerala; a puja ceremony for the film was held that day. Most of the crew members from Jacob's debut and previous film Vellimoonga were retained for Munthirivallikal Thalirkkumbol. Mohanlal, Meena, Aima, Santhosh, and Madhav were present in the first shot. A fifty-day shoot was planned in Kozhikode. The schedule was expected to break after twenty-five days.

The film, which is set in the backdrop of a housing colony, was shot in the Bilathikulam housing colony in Kozhikode. Over eighty percent of the film was shot at Kozhikode. For the housing colony, the team searched across the state for one that is densely populated and found the Kesava Menon Nagar in the suburb of Bilathikulam in Nadakkavu, Kozhikode. Another location in Kozhikode was the Chelapram, which was renamed Keezhattur panchayat in the film. Apart from actors, many of the residents of the Kesava Menon Nagar appear in the film in a song sequence featuring Meena, and contributed to the filming process. Some scenes were shot in Chelambram. A scene was set at a bus terminus in Kozhikode, but when Mohanlal arrived, a large crowd of spectators gathered and caused a traffic jam, making it difficult to shoot. It forced them to shift the location, and the scene was later shot surreptitiously with hidden cameras at Thamarassery, Kozhikode. Madhav shot for four days, while Saxena had five days.

The first schedule ended by mid-August 2016 and after a schedule break, the second schedule began at the locations in Bilathikulam on 3 September. The filming continued until a break again during Onam festival. It was resumed shortly, and expected to be finished by early October. It was completed before October and for the next schedule, the crew moved to Alappuzha district where, in Kuttanad, Ulahannan and Annyamma's ancestral homes are situated in the film. The four-day long shoot in Kuttanad was for a song sequence. Filming in Kuttanad was over by 3 October. Filming next took place at Nedumudi, Kainakary, and in Alappuzha Beach. A song was also shot in Mankombu and Muppalam, Alappuzha city. The schedule in Alappuzha district was one week long. After completing the scenes in Kerala, a song sequence remained to be shot outside the state. It was filmed in an outdoor location at Narkanda in Shimla, Himachal Pradesh. The complete filming process took a total of sixty days.

== Soundtrack ==
Munthirivallikal Thalirkkumbol

Soundtrack album by Bijibal and M. Jayachandran
- Released: 4 December 2016
- Recorded: October 2016
- Studios: Muzik Lounge School of Audio Technology, Chennai
- Genre: Feature film soundtrack
- Length: 16:32
- Language: Malayalam
- Label: Enkore Entertainment
- Producers: Bijibal; M. Jayachandran

Bijibal chronology
Kuttikalundu Sookshikkuka (2016)	Munthirivallikal Thalirkkumbol (2016)	Aby (2017)

M. Jayachandran chronology
Marupadi (2016)	Munthirivallikal Thalirkkumbol (2016)	Kambhoji (2017)

Munthirivallikal Thalirkkumbol, the original soundtrack album of the film features songs composed by Bijibal, who also composed the score, and M. Jayachandran. Both of them composed two songs for the four song soundtrack—"Maarivillu" and "Oru Puzhayarikil" by Bijibal, "Punnamada Kayal" and "Athimara Kombile" by Jayachandran. The lyrics were written by Rafeeq Ahamed, Madhu Vasudevan, and D. B. Ajithkumar. The launch for the film's music was held at a function at the Taj Hotel in Kochi on 4 December 2016 in the presence of the film crew and other guests. The soundtrack was released for digital download by Enkore Entertainment on 25 January 2017.

The film's first music video, Punnamada Kayal debuted on YouTube on 16 December 2016. The song features Ulahannan and his family cheering for a vallam kali and their other family moments. The makers also released a "how-it-was-made" video of the song "Athimara Kombile" on the video-sharing site; it was sung by Shreya Ghoshal and Vijay Yesudas. Its music video was released on 25 January 2017, the song featured locales in Shimla.

Munthirivallikal Thalirkkumbol (Original Motion Picture Soundtrack)
No.	Title	Lyrics	Music	Performer(s)	Length
1.	"Athimara Kombile"	Rafeeq Ahamed	M. Jayachandran	Shreya Ghoshal, Vijay Yesudas	4:45
2.	"Oru Puzhayarikil"	Rafeeq Ahammed	Bijibal	Shweta Mohan	3:59
3.	"Punnamada Kayal"	Madhu Vasudevan	M. Jayachandran	Jithin Raj	4:42
4.	"Maarivillu"	D. B. Ajithkumar	Bijibal	Bijibal	3:06
Total length:					16:32

== Release ==
Munthirivallikal Thalirkkumbol was initially scheduled to be released on 4 November 2016 during Diwali. It was postponed by Sophia Paul to 22 December 2016 to release before Christmas, to avoid a clash with Mohanlal-starring films Oppam and Pulimurugan still running in theatres. The 154 minute long film cleared censoring by the Central Board of Film Certification on 19 December with no cuts. However, the projected release was delayed when the Kerala Film Producers Association (KFPA) announced an indefinite strike in Kerala from 16 December 2016, following a dispute with the Kerala Film Exhibitors Federation (KFEF) over revenue sharing, that halted the screening of Malayalam films. The dispute ended on 14 January 2017. The film was rescheduled and released in India on 20 January 2017 by Weekend Blockbusters.

Munthirivallikal Thalirkkumbol had the largest distribution for a Malayalam film in the country. It was released in 337 screens (exceeding 330 screens for Pulimurugan), with 185 screens in Kerala alone. The film released internationally from 9 February on, debuting in the United States and Canada. It released in the United Arab Emirates on 16 February. Distributed by PJ Entertainments, the film released in the Europe on 17 February, with 75 screens in the United Kingdom and 17 in Ireland. Srinda Arhaan won the Asianet Film Award for Best Supporting Actor - Female for this film in 2017.

== Reception ==
=== Box office ===
The film debuted with over ₹2.62 crore (₹26.2 million) gross collection on the opening day from the Kerala box office. It grossed ₹3.25 crore (₹32.5 million) on Sunday (day 3) taking its weekend total to ₹8.70 crore (₹87 million)—the second highest-grossing opening weekend at the Kerala box office (after Pulimurugan). It collected around ₹14 crore (₹140 million) in its opening week, to become the second-highest opening week at the Kerala box office, beating Oppam and second to Pulimurugan. By the tenth day, the film grossed a total of ₹19.65 crore (₹196.5 million) from the state and completed 5000 screenings, making it the second-fastest film to cross the ₹20 crore (₹200 million) mark after Pulimurugan. The film grossed ₹30 crore (₹300 million) nationwide in twenty-one days and completed 10,000 screenings in Kerala theatres alone. It completed more than 15,000 screenings in Kerala in one month, grossed ₹38 crore from India and ₹50 crore from the worldwide box office.

The film grossed US$646,993 on the opening weekend (16 – 19 February) in the United Arab Emirates from 47 screens, the second best opener that weekend. In six weekends, it grossed US$976,231 in the country. In the United Kingdom, the film grossed £81,577 in the opening weekend from 71 sites. It crossed the £100,000 mark in four days, becoming the second highest-grossing Malayalam film in the United Kingdom (behind Pulimurugan). It grossed £20,672 in the second weekend (24 – 26 February) from 60 screens, taking its total to £162,813 from two weekends. It grossed £175,499 from the United Kingdom and Ireland territories in four weekends. The film grossed US$50,800 in the opening weekend (10 – 12 February) from 11 screens in the United States. The film remained strong after two weekends according to trade analyst Taran Adarsh. It grossed US$29,376 in the second weekend from 11 screens for a total of US$95,143 from two weekends. From seven weekends in the United States, the film grossed US$145,836, with US$1,058 from the seventh weekend (24 – 26 March). The film grossed $NZ 4,624 from 2 screens in the opening weekend (24 – 26 February) in New Zealand.

=== Critical response ===
The film received positive reviews from critics. Anu James of the International Business Times wrote "Munthitivallikal Thalirkkumbol will make you fall in love with your spouse all over again ... it has an engaging storyline with many comedy elements that will make the audience remember the good old Malayalam movies," and praised Mohanlal, saying: "It's Mohanlal who shines throughout the movie with his charisma and natural performance. From an uninterested husband to the most lovable person, he convincingly transforms setting an example to everyone around him." The reviewer from Sify called the film a "super treat for families!" and wrote, "Munthirivallikal Thalirkkumbol is an engaging family saga that justifies its tagline 'My life is my wife' ... scenarist M. Sindhuraj has come up with a competent script, with honest intentions." The reviewer praised Mohanlal's performance, saying he "gets into the shoes of Ulahannan in a spectacular way. He is funny, genuine and brilliant, evoking memories of some of his acclaimed films," he also mentioned Menon's "impressive comic timing."

Rating the film 3.5 out of 5 stars, Sanjith Sidhardhan of The Times of India wrote, "Munthirivallikal Thalirkumbol is one of the better family-oriented movies to come out in Mollywood in a long time and is worth watching." He added, "the movie's strength is undoubtedly its script and dialogues written by M. Sindhuraj. There are so many times where you feel like the movie would go a predictable path or get preachy but the director and scriptwriter has ensured that they have kept things fresh...[.]" He also praised the Mohanlal's versatility. Manoj Kumar R. of The Indian Express described the film as "an extraordinary story of an ordinary family" and rated it 3.5 out of 5 stars, calling it a "slice of life film." He added, "without an iota of vulgarity or scenes that make the family audience uncomfortable, Jibu Jacob has dealt with the most controversial topic — infidelity — in the most charming way possible. Everyone in the film has given a convincing performance while Mohanlal and Meena have performed their roles with maturity and nuance."

Rating 3.5 stars out of 5, Mythili Ramachandran of the Gulf News wrote: "This family drama — a cocktail of humour, love, and emotion — wins with a simple and sincere story ... Sindhuraj's story is something many Indian women will connect with." She also praised the actors' performances. Writing for Malayala Manorama, Litty Simon awarded 3.25 on a scale of 5 and said: "Jibu [Jacob] has made the characters and their performance as real as it could be. With a great balance of subtle humor and striking reality, the movie appeals to the audience in the best possible way." Simon praised the cast's performance, especially Mohanlal's, and praised the technical side including the music, cinematography, and editing. She added that the film has a "neat narrative" and "perfectly explores the concept of romance from various angles." Firstpost critic Anna M. M. Vetticad rated the film 3 out of 5 stars and said: "Munthirivallikal Thalirkkumbol is a pleasant film, both charming and likeable. It is relatable, insightful and entertaining — a blend that is no mean achievement." She praised the casting, saying "even the littlest role seems to have been cast with care" and the actors' performances.

Aneesh K. Mathew of Mathrubhumi was enthusiastic about Mohanlal's performance. He felt the film was entertaining from the beginning to end, and Sindhiraj and Jacob have made a "best family film." V. G. Nakul of Kalakaumudi stated that the "film will reflect some of the characters and situations we are familiar with ... some events which could or can happen in a family, with a simple beginning and an end. In between it reminds us of some things, and it is the sweetness and beauty in it that makes this film different." He also praised Mohanlal's performance. Writing for Deepika, V. Sreekanth elaborated on how the film shows that the love that sprouts in a family is higher than any other love. He praised Mohanlal's performance, and the making, characterization and music, concluding that "the film is well entertaining."

=== Accolades ===
Mohanlal received the National Film Award – Special Jury Award for his performance in the film.
