= Sanusha =

Indian actress

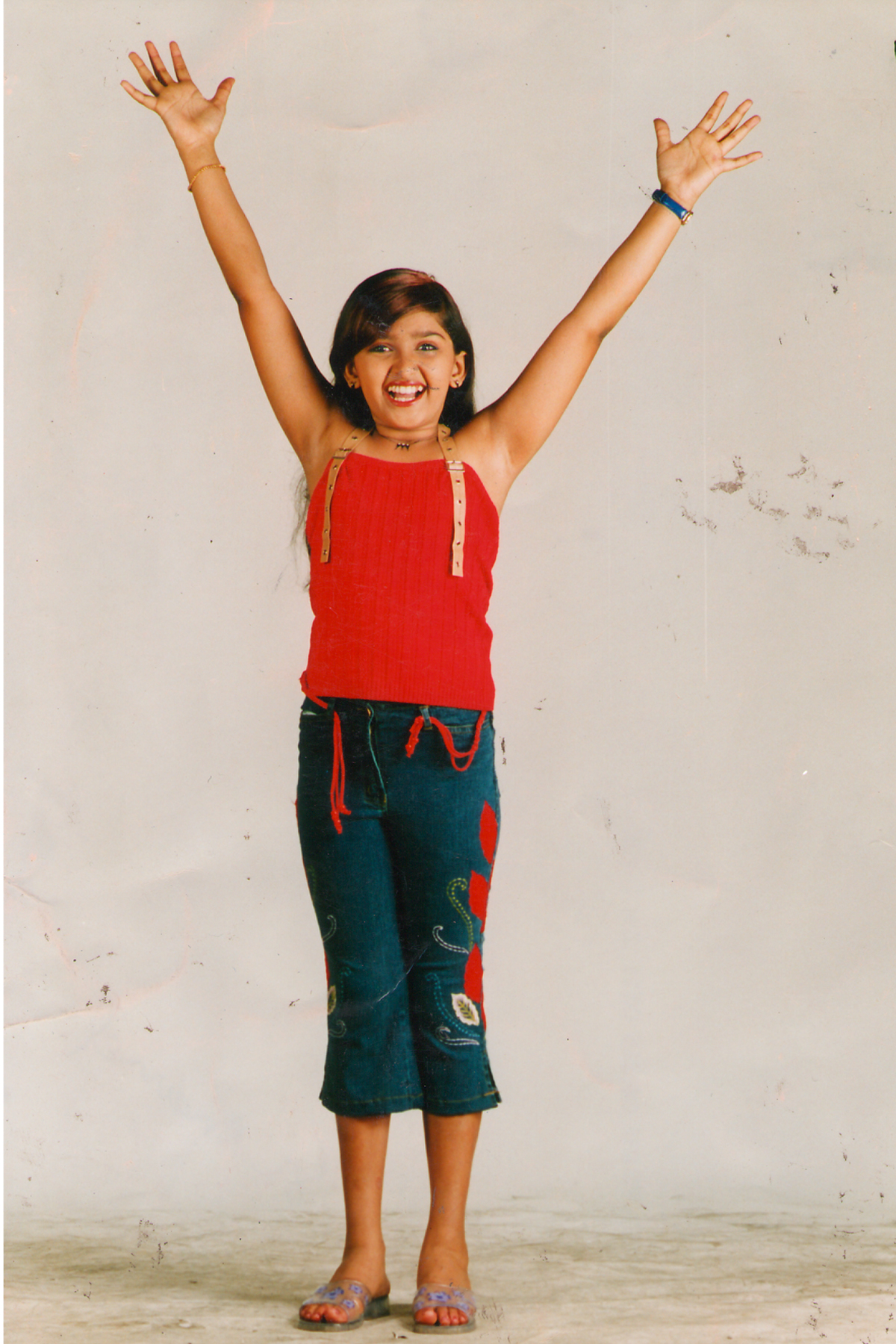
- Young Sanusha
- Born: Pallikkunnu, Kannur district, Kerala, India
- Education: S. N. College, Kannur; St. Teresa's College, Ernakulam
- Occupation: Actor
- Years active: 2000–present
- Relatives: Sanoop Santhosh (brother)

Sanusha Santhosh is an Indian actress who works predominantly in Malayalam cinema. She started her career as a child artist to leading actress and supporting character roles. She also appears in some Tamil, Telugu and Kannada films too.

== Early life ==
Sanusha was born in Pallikunnu, Kannur to Usha and Santhosh. She has studied at Sreepuram School, Pallikunnu Kannur. After her graduation in BCom from SN College, Kannur, she did MA in Sociology at St. Teresa's College. She also completed MSc in Global Mental Health & Society from University of Edinburgh, Scotland. Sanusha has a younger brother Sanoop Santhosh, who is a child artist, known for his acting in Philips and the Monkey Pen.

== Career ==
After performing in television serials, Sanusha started her film career in 2000 at the age of 5 with the movie Dada Sahib. She became a star in Malayalam films as baby Sanusha giving stellar performances in Meesa Madhavan, Kaazhcha, Mampazhakkalam etc. She won the Kerala State Film Award for Best Child Artist in 2004 for her performances in Kaazhcha and Soumyam. She debuted as a heroine in Tamil film Naalai Namadhe followed by demure roles in Renigunta, Nandhi and Eththan. In Malayalam she debuted as heroine opposite Dileep in Mr.Marumakan. In the Malayalam movie, Kuttiyum Kolum Sanusha acted against the midget actor Guinness Pakru, the role gave her rave reviews. In Tamil film Alex Pandian she did an item song with Karthi.

Sanusha won a Special Jury Mention at the 2013 Kerala State Film Awards for Zachariayude Garbhinikal.

== Filmography ==
Key
†	Denotes films that have not yet been released

List of Sanusha film credits
Year	Film	Role	Language	Notes
2000	Dada Sahib	Young Ayisha	Malayalam	Debut film as child artist
2001	Saivar Thirumeni	Krishnapriya	Malayalam	
2001	Karumadikkuttan	Janutty	Malayalam	
2001	Raavanaprabhu	Young Janaki	Malayalam	
2001	Meghamalhar	Malu	Malayalam	
2001	Ee Parakkum Thalika	Young Gayathri	Malayalam	
2001	Kasi	Younger Lakshmi	Tamil	
2002	Kanmashi	Kanmashi's friend	Malayalam	
2002	Meesa Madhavan	Young Rugmini	Malayalam	
2002	Sundhara Travels	Young Gayathri	Tamil	Scenes reused from Ee Parakkum Thalika
2002	Krishna Pakshakkilikal	Raji	Malayalam	
2003	Ente Veedu Appuvinteyum	Teena	Malayalam	
2003	War and Love	Mini	Malayalam	
2003	Malsaram	Ponnus	Malayalam	
2004	Manjupoloru Penkutti	Kani	Malayalam	
2004	Kaazhcha	Ambily	Malayalam	Winner, Kerala State Film Award for Best Child Artist
2004	Soumyam	Daughter	Malayalam	Winner, Kerala State Film Award for Best Child Artist
2004	Maampazhakkaalam	Mallu	Malayalam	
2006	Bangaram	Vindhya Reddy	Telugu	
2006	Keerthi Chakra	Kashmiri Child	Malayalam	
2007	Chotta Mumbai	Mercey	Malayalam	
2008	Bheemaa	Suji	Tamil	
2009	Renigunta	Unnamed mute girl	Tamil	
2009	Naalai Namadhe	Shanthi	Tamil	
2011	Nandhi	Karthiga	Tamil	
2011	Eththan	Selvi	Tamil	
2012	Mr. Marumakan	Rajalakshmi	Malayalam	Debut as Lead Actress
2012	Idiots	Athira	Malayalam	
2012	Genius	Sri	Telugu	
2013	Alex Pandian	Sneha	Tamil	
2013	Kuttiyum Kolum	Indu	Malayalam	
2013	Zachariayude Garbhinikal	Saira	Malayalam	Nominated – Filmfare Award for Best Supporting Actress – Malayalam; 3rd South Indian International Movie Awards for Best Actress in a Supporting Role
2014	Sapthamashree Thaskaraha	Annamma	Malayalam	
2015	Mili	Anupama	Malayalam	
2015	Nirnnayakam	Arya	Malayalam	
2016	Vettah	Uma Sathyamoorthi	Malayalam	
2016	Oru Murai Vanthu Parthaya	Ashwathy	Malayalam	
2016	Santheyalli Nintha Kabira	Loyi	Kannada	
2017	Kodiveeran	Parvathi	Tamil	
2019	Jersey	Journalist Ramya	Telugu	
2023	Jaladhara Pumpset Since 1962	Chippi	Malayalam	
TBA	Marathakam †	TBA	Malayalam	Post Production
TBA	Liquor Island †	TBA	Malayalam	Post Production

== Television career ==
List of Sanusha television credits
Year	Title	Role	Channel	Notes
	Fnsa The Great			TV serial (Child Artist)
2004	Swapnam	Young Gouri	Asianet	TV serial (Child Artist)
2005	Orma	Pavithra	Asianet	TV serial (Child Artist)
2006	Unniyarcha	Young Unniyarcha	Asianet	TV serial (Child Artist)
2006	Violin		Surya TV	TV serial (Child Artist)
2006–2007	Amma Manassu	Chakki Mol	Asianet	TV serial (Child Artist)
2016	Minute to Win It	Participant	Mazhavil Manorama	Game show
2017	Page 3	Model	Kappa TV	
2021	Super 4 Juniors	Mentor	Mazhavil Manorama	Reality show
2021	Super Power	Mentor	Flowers TV	Game show
2021-2022	Star Magic	Mentor	Flowers TV	Game show

== Awards and nominations ==
Kerala State Film Awards

- 2004 – Best Female Child Artist: Kaazhcha, Soumyam
- 2014 – Special Mention: Zachariayude Garbhinikal for her portrayal of Zaira, a pregnant girl.

61st Filmfare Awards South

- Nominated – Filmfare Awards South for Best Supporting Actress for Zachariayude Garbhinikal for her portrayal of Zaira a pregnant girl.

3rd South Indian International Movie Awards

- 3rd South Indian International Movie Awards for Best Actress in a Supporting Role – Zachariayude Garbhinikal

Kerala State Television Awards

- 2006 – Best Child Artist – Violin

Asianet Television awards

- 2007 – Best Child Actress – Unniyarcha
- 2008 – Best Child Actress – Amma Manassu

Asianet Film Awards

- 2004 – Best Child Artist Female – Kaazhcha
