= Ellam Sheriyakum =

2021 Malayalam language film

- Theatrical release poster
- Directed by: Jibu Jacob
- Written by: Sharis Mohammed
- Produced by: Thomas Thiruvalla; Dr. Paul Varghese
- Starring: Asif Ali; Rajisha Vijayan
- Cinematography: Sreejith Nair
- Edited by: E. S. Sooraj
- Music by: Ouseppachan
- Production companies: Thomas Thiruvalla Films; Dr. Paul's Entertainment
- Distributed by: Central Pictures
- Release date: 19 November 2021
- Running time: 174 minutes
- Country: India
- Language: Malayalam

Ellam Sheriyakum (Everything will be fine) is a 2021 Indian Malayalam-language political drama film directed by Jibu Jacob. The film stars Asif Ali, Rajisha Vijayan and Siddique. Set in central Travancore and parts of Kannur, the film revolves around a politician and his family and how politics plays a role in their personal lives. The film released in theatres on 19 November 2021 and became a box office failure.

== Cast ==
- Asif Ali as Party Loyalist Sakhavu Vineeth
- Rajisha Vijayan as Ancy Chacko, Chacko's daughter
- Siddique as MLA K. C. Chacko, Ancy's father
- Tulasi Shivamani as Mariyamma, Ancy's mother
- Indrans as dressmaker (tailor)
- Kalabhavan Shajohn as Adv. V. M Satheesan MLA
- Balu Varghese as Sakhavu Nivin George
- Sruthy Jayan as Sakhavu Ajitha Narayanan
- Sudheer Karamana as Sakhavu Vijayan (local committee secretary)
- Abhiram V as News Reporter (Visual Media)
- G. Suresh Kumar as UPF Chief Minister Sukumaran Nair
- Johny Antony as Johnson, Asst. of Chacko
- Anjali Nair
- Sreejith Ravi as LPF Party Leader
- Rajesh Sharma
- Kottayam Ramesh as Kerala Congress Leader and Current Revenue Minister K.M.Johny
- Ouseppachan as quarry owner
- Abdul Majeed as KPCC leader
- Abhiram V as News Reporter
- Monisha Arshak as Party officer staff member
- Sethulakshmi as Reethama
- Jordy Poonjar
- Kichu Tellas as Rony
- Neeraja Rajendran
- Jiffin George

== Release ==
The film was scheduled for release on 17 September 2021 but was postponed due to the COVID-19 pandemic. It was eventually released in theatres on 19 November 2021, distributed by Central Pictures.

== Reception ==
=== Critical response ===
The Times of India rated the film 4 on a scale of 5, noting that the film is "a thought-provoking political drama", and that the success of the film is in "how it does not support any ideology, but shows a mirror to the problems in both political parties, and is not pedantic while doing so." The Hindu's S. R. Praveen wrote that the director Jibu Jacob is "on the lookout for that perfect balance between a family drama and a political commentary" like in his earlier film Vellimoonga, but "take the light-heartedness, humour, and engaging script out of that film [Vellimoonga], and you would be left with Ellam Sheriyakum." Malayala Manorama rated the film 2.5/5 and wrote: "A stale plot, unconvincing situations and sloppy scripting is the bane of formulaic filmmaking. Ellam Sheriyakum, roughly translated as 'everything will be all right', fails to tackle all of these common errors." Sowmya Rajendran of The News Minute rated the film with 2 stars out of 5 and was critical of screenplay stating, "[it] is overstuffed with too many issues bordering on caricature". Rajendran felt that last 30 minutes of film were dull to the point that she had the urge to leave. Concluding, she wrote, "Maybe on paper everything sounded great, but what the audience witnesses and understands is a total misfire".

=== Box office ===
The film was a Box-office failure.

== Soundtrack ==
The soundtrack is composed by Ouseppachan on lyrics of B. K. Harinarayanan. It is Ouseppachan's 200th film. The first song "Pinnenthe" was released on 24 October 2021 by Satyam Audios.

Track listing
No.	Title	Singer(s)	Length
1.	"Pinnenthe"	K. S. Harisankar, Ouseppachan	4:40
2.	"Ilapeythu Moodumi"	Sithara Krishnakumar	1:56
3.	"Thanne Thanne"	William Francis	4:20
4.	"Election Song"	Rahul R Nath	3:51
