= Mullassery Madhavan Kutty Nemom P. O. =

- Film poster
- Directed by: Kumar Nanda
- Written by: Swathi Bhaskar
- Produced by: K S Chandran; Sam Varghese
- Starring: Anoop Menon; Sonal Devraj
- Cinematography: Sivakumar
- Edited by: Prejish Prakash
- Music by: Raveendran; Ratheesh Vegha
- Distributed by: Karthik Vision
- Release date: 10 February 2012
- Country: India
- Language: Malayalam
- Box office: ₹38 lakh (US$45,000)

Mullassery Madhavan Kutty Nemom P. O. is a 2012 Malayalam film by Kumar Nanda, starring Anoop Menon and Sonal Devaraj in the lead roles.

== Cast ==
- Anoop Menon as Mullaserry Madhavankuty
- Sonal Devraj as Sitamani, Madhavankutty's wife
- Esther Anil as Devu, Madhavankutty's daughter
- KPAC Lalitha as Mullassery Parvathy Amma, Madhavankutty's mother
- Innocent as Meenathethu Vikraman Nair
- Nishanth Sagar as Viswanathan
- Praveen Prem as Baiju Prathap
- T. P. Madhavan as Narayana Pisharody
- Suraj Venjaramood as Sharavanan
- Shiju as Prathapkumar
- Anoop as Kannan
- Nandu as Gulabdas
- Bala as Khalid
- Harisree Ashokan as Shasankan Pravachambalam
- Janardanan as Ambattu Balagangadhara Menon
- Sidhartha Siva as Shankar Nath
- Dinesh Prabhakar as Thevara Stephen
- Indrans as Lopez
- Sonia as Anupama
- Kalabhavan Shajohn as Monichen
- Kalpana as Maria
- Poojappura Ravi as movie actor
