= Mullamottum Munthiricharum =

- Theatrical release poster
- Directed by: Aneesh Anwar
- Written by: Biju K. Joseph
- Produced by: Mary Soman; Soman Pallatt
- Starring: Indrajith; Meghana Raj; Ananya
- Cinematography: Sujith Vasudev
- Music by: Mohan Sithara
- Production company: Jyothirgamaya
- Release date: 12 July 2012
- Country: India
- Language: Malayalam

Mullamottum Munthiricharum is a 2012 Malayalam film directed by Aneesh Anwar, starring Indrajith, Meghana Raj and Ananya in lead roles. Mohan Sithara is the music director of the film.

== Plot ==
Churatta Jose, a local goon and an expert snake catcher, is stabbed in his stomach by someone at night. A flashback reveals his early life.

== Cast ==
- Indrajith as Churatta Jose (Ousepp)
- Meghana Raj as Suchitra
- Ananya as Elizabeth (Ranimol)
- Thilakan as Vazhakkula Achan
- Ashokan as Tomichan
- Tini Tom as Sunnichan
- Kozhikode Narayanan Nair as Suchithra's and Sumithra's father
- Praveena as Sumithra
- Anil Murali as Arumukhan, Sumithra's husband
- Kochu Preman as Plaaparambil Kuriyakose (Kuriyachan), Ranimol's father
- Kalashala Babu as Thankappan
