= S. N. College, Kannur =

Post-graduate college in India

- Type: Public
- Established: 1960; 66 years ago
- Academic affiliations: Kannur University
- Principal: Dr. T. Shivadasan
- Location: Thottada, Kannur, Kerala, India; 11.85879°N 75.41010°E
- Website: sncollegekannur.ac.in

Sree Narayana College, Kannur is a post-graduate college affiliated to the Kannur University in India.

== Notable alumni ==
- P. Santhosh Kumar, Member of Parliament, Rajya Sabha
- Sahal Abdul Samad, Indian International footballer
- Prakash Bare, Indian film actor
- C. K. Vineeth, Indian footballer
- Manju Warrier, Malayalam film actress
- Rayshad Rauf, playback singer
- Sanusha, Malayalam film actress
- Sayanora Philip, playback singer
- A. P. Abdullakutty, Former MP

== Courses offered ==
- B.A
- B.Com
- B.Sc
- M.A. in Economics
- M.A. in English
- M.Com. With Accountancy and Finance
- M.Sc. Chemistry
- M.Sc. Physics
- M.Sc. Zoology(Parasitology)

== Ph.D. programs ==
- Zoology
- Chemistry
- Commerce
- Botany
