= Naalai Namadhe =

Naalai Namadhe may refer to:

- Naalai Namadhe (1975 film), an Indian Tamil-language masala film
- Naalai Namadhe (2009 film), a Tamil-language drama film
