= Puthan Panam =

2017 film by Ranjith

- First look poster
- Directed by: Ranjith
- Written by: Ranjith; P. V. Shajikumar ( Dialogues)
- Produced by: Ranjith; Abraham Mathew; Arun Narayanan
- Starring: Mammootty; Siddique
- Cinematography: Om Prakash
- Edited by: Manoj Kannoth
- Music by: Songs: Shaan Rahman; Score: Achu Rajamani
- Production company: Three Colour Cinema Cinema
- Distributed by: Phars Films; Tricolor Entertainment; Popcorn Entertainments
- Release date: 12 April 2017
- Country: India
- Language: Malayalam
- Box office: ₹8.3 crore

Puthan Panam (transl. New money) is a 2017 Indian Malayalam-language action thriller film written, directed and co-produced by Ranjith, based on the issue of black money and demonetisation. It stars Mammootty, Siddique, Mamukkoya, Hareesh Perumanna, Nirmal Palazhi and Swaraj Gramika in prominent roles.

The film follows the series of incidents that happened in Mangalore-based underworld don Nithyananda Shenoy (Mammootty)'s life, following the announcement of 2016 Indian banknote demonetisation on 8 November. Mammootty speaks Kasargod dialect in the movie. The film was released on 12 April 2017 two days before the Vishu holiday. The film was dubbed in Tamil as Cash back and Kannada as Demonetization.

== Plot ==
Nithyananda Shenoy, an infamous gangster and financier from Kasaragod, becomes embroiled in the chaos following the 2016 Indian banknote demonetisation. The sudden policy change forces Shenoy to navigate the treacherous waters of black money and corruption. As he attempts to safeguard his wealth, Shenoy encounters various characters, including Muthuvel, a young boy from the underprivileged sections of Kochi, and his mother Sundari. Their lives intersect with Shenoy's as they struggle to survive in a society upended by the demonetisation. Shenoy's journey is marked by ethical dilemmas as he confronts corrupt politicians, law enforcement, and fellow criminals.

== Cast ==
- Mammootty as Nityananda Shenoy
- Swaraj Gramika as Muthuvel
- Iniya as Sundari
- Mammukkoya as Awkku
- Siddique as C.I Habeeb Rahman
- Sai Kumar as Ex-Minister Chandrabhanu
- P Balachandran as Adv.M.K Pillai
- Baiju as Neutral Kunjappan
- Joy Mathew as Mahin Haji
- Jennifer Antony as Saradha, Shenoy's wife
- Sheelu Abraham as City Police Commissioner Sara Dominic IPS
- Niranjana Anoop as Miya
- Suresh Krishna as Manager Ramanna
- Hareesh Perumanna as Chandru aka Chandrahassan
- Anil Murali as Adv.Shihab
- Ravi Mariya as Narayanan
- Arun as Artist
- Parvathy Nambiar as Artist
- Vishak Nair as Sunil
- Kottayam Nazeer as Nagaraj
- Aadukalam Naren as Kumaravel
- Vijayakumar as Jamshad
- Ganapathi as Shine
- Abu Salim as Aravindan
- Kunchan as Bharathettan
- Saiju Kurup as Babu Rajesh
- Indrans as Kuruvi (Marthandan)
- Sohan Seenulal as Sathyan
- Biju Pappan as Ganeshan
- Prajin as Alen Mathew
- Renji Panicker as Iqbal Mether, Director General of Police/DGP, State Police Chief
- Nirmal Palazhi as Sharaf

== Production ==
=== Development ===
A film with Mammootty and Ranjith uniting was reported in April 2016. Ranjith later confirmed the news and said the title was not confirmed. In November, the title was revealed as Puthan Panam, with its subject reported to be of black money and a cast including Iniya, Renji Panicker, Sai Kumar and Siddique. A tagline, 'The New Indian Rupee', is suffixed to the title, coinciding with the situation when the ₹1000 and ₹500 banknotes were demonetised in India by the Central Government.

=== Filming ===
Filming began on 25 November 2016. Filming took place in Cochin, Calicut, Goa and Pollachi. Mammootty plays Nithyananda Shenoy, a middle-aged man who hails from Kumbala and speaks Kasargode dialect. Mammootty was trained in Kasargode accent with the guidance of dialogue writer P. V. Shajikumar. Ranjith called Shajikumar for writing dialogues in Puthan Panam as per the suggestion of Mammootty. Mammootty found Kumar on a WhatsApp group named 'Njatuvela' where both were members. When Shajikumar translated a poem, "Apolitical Intellectuals" by Otto René Castillo, in Kasargode dialect and posted on the group, Mammootty was impressed. Shooting lasted three months. Swaraj Gramika, a child artiste from a Thiruvananthapuram-based theatre group, who played a prominent role in the film, was selected after a casual meet with Ranjith in Kozhikode, whom he had earlier sent the details of his two short films and theatre productions. Shaan Rahman composed the soundtrack.

== Reception ==
=== Box office ===
The film got mixed to positive reviews from the critics. The film grossed ₹2.42 crore from first day of its release in Kerala box office. The film grossed ₹10.3 crore from 25 days in Kerala box office.

=== Critical response ===
Deepa Soman of The Times of India rated the film three out five and concluded, "If you go expecting to watch a wholesome film on the black money issue, you might not get your money's worth from this flick. But if all that you care about is to stay entertained through the length of the film, it is worth your ‘Puthan Panam’". Though appreciating Mammootty's characterisation saying, "You feel sorry for Mammootty, who plays his character with total dedication. He looks convincing and is his makeover is just brilliant," Moviebuzz of Sify stated, "Puthan Panam is lazily done and besides some casual references here and there, the connection with the demonetization drive is barely impressive. In short, after a good start, this one goes awry. Sad!"
