= Kumbasaram =

2015 film directed by Aneesh Anwar

- Directed by: Aneesh Anwar
- Written by: Aneesh Anwar
- Produced by: Niyas Ismail
- Starring: Jayasurya; Honey Rose; Vineeth; Priyanka Nair
- Cinematography: Alby
- Edited by: Renjith Touchriver
- Music by: Vishnu Mohan Sithara
- Production company: Frames Inevitable
- Distributed by: Frames Inevitable
- Release date: 22 May 2015
- Country: India
- Language: Malayalam

Kumbasaram: The Confession is a 2015 Indian Malayalam thriller film written and directed by Aneesh Anwar, starring Jayasurya, Honey Rose, Vineeth and Priyanka. The film features music composed by Vishnu Mohan Sithara. The music label was Muzik247. The film deals with the unexpected tragedies that befall the family of an autorickshaw driver. The movie is an unofficial remake of Serbian film Klopka with few little changes. It released on 22 May 2015.

== Plot ==
The movie begins with the confessions of Alby, an autorickshaw driver. He was leading a happy life with his wife Meera and their only son Jerry. Alby and Meera are extremely attached with Jerry and dream about his great future. But despite the expectations, Jerry falls critically ill; thus turning Alby and Meera's life upside down.

== Cast ==
- Jayasurya as Alby
- Honey Rose as Meera
- Aakash Santhosh as Jerry
- Vineeth as Rafi
- Shanavas as Paul Varghese/Abdulla
- Priyanka Nair as Ayisha
- Tini Tom as Producer Pattabhiraman
- Gourav Menon as Rasool
- Asha Aravind as School Teacher
- Lishoy as Doctor Prabhakaran
- Jayakrishnan as Meera's brother
- Anjana Jayaprakash as News Reporter
- Gawrie Sankarie as Malu, Jerry's friend

== Music ==
Kumbasaram

Soundtrack album by Vishnu Mohan Sithara
- Genre: Feature film soundtrack
- Language: Malayalam
- Producer: Vishnu Mohan Sithara

Composer Mohan Sithara's son and young music director Vishnu Mohan Sithara scored the music for the film. Vishnu, had debuted into music by singing in Aneesh's previous film Zachariyayude Garbhinikal.

== Reception ==
The Times of India gave a positive review, stating "Jayasurya and Honey Rose succeed in taking the viewers through their emotional upheaval and child actors do not disappoint. The film connects the missing dots at key points to keep them engaged. Though it unfolds at its own pace and tests the viewers' patience at times, Kumbasaram does have its moments."

Filmibeat.com also gave a positive review with a rating of 3/5, stating the films as "A perfect emotional thriller which impresses with a brilliant story, narrative and amazing performances by the actors."
