= Home (2021 film) =

2021 Indian film

- Official release poster
- Directed by: Rojin Thomas
- Written by: Rojin Thomas
- Produced by: Vijay Babu
- Starring: Indrans; Sreenath Bhasi; Naslen; Deepa Thomas; Manju Pillai; Johny Antony; Kainakary Thankaraj
- Cinematography: Neil D'Cunha
- Edited by: Prejish Prakash
- Music by: Rahul Subrahmanian
- Production company: Friday Film House
- Distributed by: Amazon Prime Video
- Release date: 19 August 2021 (India)
- Running time: 161 minutes
- Country: India
- Language: Malayalam

Home (also known as #Home) is a 2021 Indian Malayalam-language drama film directed and written by Rojin Thomas. The film stars Indrans, Sreenath Bhasi, Naslen, Deepa Thomas, Manju Pillai, Johny Antony and Kainakary Thankaraj. The film was released on Amazon Prime Video on 19 August 2021.

This film received widespread critical acclaim from critics. The story, background score, cinematography, social relevance, characterization and performances of the lead cast especially that of Indrans and Manju Pillai were critically acclaimed. In 2023, the film won the National Film Award For Best Feature Film In Malayalam.

== Plot ==
Oliver Twist, a technologically challenged 60-year-old man, lives with his retired nurse wife Kuttiyamma, his cognitively impaired father Appachan, and his younger son Charles, an teenager struggling to grow his YouTube channel. His elder son Anthony, a former architect turned screenwriter, lives in a messy apartment away from home. Following the success of his debut film two years earlier, Anthony faces severe writer's block and a tight one-week deadline for his second script. Overwhelmed by social media distractions and a tense relationship with his girlfriend, Priya, Anthony returns to his childhood home, hoping to find inspiration.

At home, Anthony remains easily distracted and frustrated. He frequently compares Oliver to Priya's accomplished father, Joseph, and openly rebukes him for his lack of professional success. Deeply hurt by Anthony's disdain for him, he quietly weeps. Later, he remembers an extraordinary event from his childhood that he attempts to share with Anthony, but the latter continuously brushes him off.

Desperate to meet his deadline, Anthony pitches a story to actor Vishal, who politely rejects the script as irrelevant. Returning home, an enraged Anthony goes on a extreme rant about Vishal. While trying to use a smartphone, Oliver accidentally broadcasts Anthony's outburst on FaceBook, triggering widespread online backlash against Anthony. Distraught over ruining his son's career, Oliver suffers from insomnia and seeks help through therapy and Tai Chi classes, eventually mastering the use of his smartphone.

At Joseph's insistence, Anthony decides to write a handwritten apology to Vishal. Taking advantage of the moment, Oliver finally tells Anthony his story: years earlier, Oliver and his friend, Suryan, risked their lives to rescue a critically ill child. They transported the child and the mother across a river filled with wild elephants inside a large cooking vessel, secured a vehicle, and narrowly prevented the car from rolling off a cliff before successfully reaching a hospital. Unimpressed, Anthony dismisses the tale as exaggerated. Fed up with both her sons constantly humiliating Oliver, Kuttiyamma angrily confronts Anthony and Charles.

At Joseph's 50th birthday celebration, Joseph's mother reveals the story behind a featured family photograph, recounting the exact rescue mission Oliver had described to Anthony. Realizing that the baby Oliver saved as a child was Joseph, Anthony experiences a profound change of heart. He recognizes the emptiness of seeking validation on social media and learns to appreciate the unconditional support of his family. Later, Joseph's mother vists Oliver's home to express her gratitude to Oliver and Suryan for saving her son's life, reuniting the family.

== Cast ==
- Indrans as Oliver Twist, a doting father who is approachable and kind; however, feels distant to his children due to their excessive use of technology. He sets out on a journey to discover more about using smartphones to get closer to his children but discovers its damaging effects and discovers himself in the meantime.
  - Minon as Young Oliver Twist
- Manju Pillai as Kuttiyamma Oliver Twist, a retired nurse who is the loving yet strong willed, strict and short-tempered mother to Antony and Charles and wife to Oliver Twist
- Sreenath Bhasi as Antony Oliver Twist, an upcoming filmmaker, who is also a writer and the director of the film "Stories" (In the movie). He is in a relationship with Priya and suffers from a serious phone addiction, and is always quite rude and arrogant to his family
- Naslen as Charles Oliver Twist, a teenager who is obsessed with becoming a social media star who apparently also suffers from a phone addiction but is not as arrogant as Antony
- Anoop Menon as Vishal, an actor
- Vijay Babu as Franklin, the psychologist
- Aju Varghese as Cinematographer
- Deepa Thomas as Priya Joseph Lopez, Antony's girlfriend
- Kainakary Thankaraj as Appachan, an old literary translator, who in his early years used to translate English literature into Malayalam, which led to him naming his kids after well-known literature characters.
- Johny Antony as Suryan, Oliver Twist's best friend from childhood. They remain close at this age. He is paranoid about being ill and dying.
  - Ashlin Joseph as Young Suryan
- Srikant Murali as Joseph Lopez, a wealthy and successful businessman and the father of Priya. Antony looks up to Joseph a lot and compares him to his father, Oliver Twist.
  - Alphonse Joseph as Young Joseph Lopez
- Asha Aravind as Joseph's wife
- K. P. A. C. Lalitha as Annamma, Joseph's mother, who is an artist.
  - Priyanka Nair as Young Annamma
- Pauly Valsan as Molly, Franklin's Attender
- Maniyanpilla Raju as Baby, the film producer
- Shaju Sreedhar as Mobile shop owner
- Kiran Aravindakshan as Justin
- Chithra as Justin's wife
- Geethi Sangeetha as Suryan's wife
- Fukru as Kichu, Priya's cousin
- Subrahmanian Unni as Sahib
- Dev Mohan as Film hero (cameo appearance in "Onnunarnnu Vannu Sooryan")

== Music ==
Rahul Subrahmanian is the music director of the movie. He has composed four songs for the film and also did the background scores for the movie.

Song	Singer	Lyricist	Ref.
Mukiluthodaanaayi	Madhu Balakrishnan	Arun Alat	
Itha Vazhi Maariyodunnu	Vineeth Srinivasan; Arun Alat	Shyam Muraleedharan; Arun Alat	
Onnunarnnu Vannu Sooryan	Karthik	Arun Alat	
Ra Thinkalin	Vijay Yesudas; Remya Nambeesan	Mamatha Seemanth	

== Release ==
The film was released on Amazon Prime Video on 19 August 2021.

== Reception ==
The Times of India rated 3.5 out of 5 and wrote, "The movie is a must watch entertainer that the whole family can laugh and cry happy tears all through together". The Free Press Journal said that thoughtfully written and directed by Rojin Thomas, Home is a film representing the present times when emotions get only expressed on digital mediums, forgetting or avoiding personal contacts. Hindustan Times commented that sometimes too sweets but most times heartwarming, Rojin Thomas brings to life a lovely family drama that is driven by Indrans' effortless performance. Firstpost rated 3 on 5 for the movie and wrote, "Parts of #Home feel stretched, and the film could have done with some scissoring, but when it works, it works so well that this complaint recedes into the background in the face of its overall endearing nature and loveable simplicity."
