= Santheyalli Nintha Kabira =

- ಸಂತೆಯಲ್ಲಿ ನಿಂತ ಕಬೀರ
- Directed by: lndra Babu
- Screenplay by: Indra Babu and Gopal Wajapeyi
- Story by: Original:Bhisham Sahni, Kannada adaptation: Gopal Wajapeyi
- Produced by: Kumaraswamy Pathikonda
- Starring: Shiva Rajkumar; Sanusha; Sarath Kumar
- Cinematography: Naveen Kumar
- Edited by: Vishwa
- Music by: Ismail Darbar
- Production company: Subrahmanyaa Productions
- Release date: 29 July 2016
- Country: India
- Language: Kannada

Santheyalli Nintha Kabira (transl. Kabira standing in market) is a 2016 Indian Kannada-language epic biopic-drama film adapted from Bhisham Sahni's Hindi play Kabira Khada Bazaar Mein. The film is directed Indra Babu of Kabbadi fame. Original story by Bhisham Sahni was adapted and the screenplay is written in Kannada by Indra Babu and Gopal Wajpeyi. Starring Shiva Rajkumar as the protagonist Kabir, the film is about the life of the mystic 15th-century poet. It also stars Sanusha and Sarath Kumar in other pivotal roles. The film was launched on the Ugadi festival day of 2015 and is slated to release on 29 July 2016.

== Cast ==
- Shiva Rajkumar as Kabir Das
- Sanusha as Loi
- Sarath Kumar as Sikandar Lodi
- Avinash as Kabir's father
- Sharath Lohitashwa
- Anant Nag as Ramananda
- Bhagirathi Bai Kadam as Kabir's mother
- Sunitha Ramachari
- Sanjjana as Sanjana
- Prashanth Siddi

== Production ==
After roping in Shivarajkumar for the protagonist role, director Indra Babu announced that actor Amitabh Bachchan would play the role of Ramanand, the teacher of Kabir. Om Puri was to feature in this movie but could not make it. Also Mithun Chakraborty was rumored to play an important role. However, later the idea was dropped to cast them. Music director Ismail Darbar was roped in to make his debut in Kannada films. The film was officially launched on the auspicious day of Ugadi festival at the Bangalore Palace grounds. Actors Puneeth Rajkumar and Raghavendra Rajkumar sounded the first clap for the shoot. Filming was planned at Mysore, Varanasi and the Himalayan region.

== Soundtrack ==
Santheyalli Nintha Kabira

Soundtrack album by Ismail Darbar
- Released: 27 November 2015
- Recorded: 2015
- Genre: Feature film soundtrack
- Label: Aananda Audio Video
- Producer: Ismail Darbar

Noted Bollywood composer, Ismail Darbar has composed the music for five songs and six Dohas. Gopala Vajpayee has written the lyrics for all the songs.

All lyrics are written by Gopal Wajpeyi.

Track list
| No. | Title | Singer(s) | Length |
|---|---|---|---|
| 1. | "Dharmikanalla Adharimakanalla" | Ramachandra Hadpad |
| 2. | "Naavu Premada Huccharu" | Anweshaa, Kavita Seth |
| 3. | "Baare Ninage Naanu" | Sonu Nigam, Anweshaa |
| 4. | "Maneyembodu" | Mohammed Irfan, Anweshaa |
| 5. | "Leelemayana Leeleyu" | Sukhwinder Singh |
| 6. | "Kalla Poojege" | Ramachandra Hadpad |
| 7. | "Avane Mahadeva" | Ramachandra Hadpad |
| 8. | "Vishwasadalli" | Javed Ali |
| 9. | "Shastravannodi" | Ramachandra Hadpad |
