= Rojin Thomas =

Indian film director

- Born: Rojin Philip Thomas; Thiruvananthapuram, Kerala, India
- Education: Indian Maritime University
- Occupations: Film director Scriptwriter; Editor
- Years active: 2013–present
- Awards: 69th National Award for Best film in Malayalam (2023), Kerala State Award For Award For Best Children's Film Director and Best Children's Film 2013

Rojin Thomas is an Indian film director and script writer who works in the Malayalam film industry.

== Career ==
He made his directional debut with Philips and the Monkey Pen (2013), directed along with Shanil Muhammed. His second film was Jo and the Boy (2015). His third film Home (2021) received widespread critical attention.

Philips and the Monkey Pen won three awards at 2013 Kerala State Film Awards for Best Children's Film, Best Child Artist for (Sanoop Santhosh) and Best Children's Film Director.

Jo and the Boy won two awards at 2015 Kerala State Film Awards for Best Choreography (Sreejith) and Best Costume Designer (Nissar).

== Filmography ==
Year	Film	Notes
2013	Philips and the Monkey Pen	
2015	Jo and the Boy	
2021	Home	
2026	Kathanar – The Wild Sorcerer	Also editor
