= P. V. Shajikumar =

Indian author

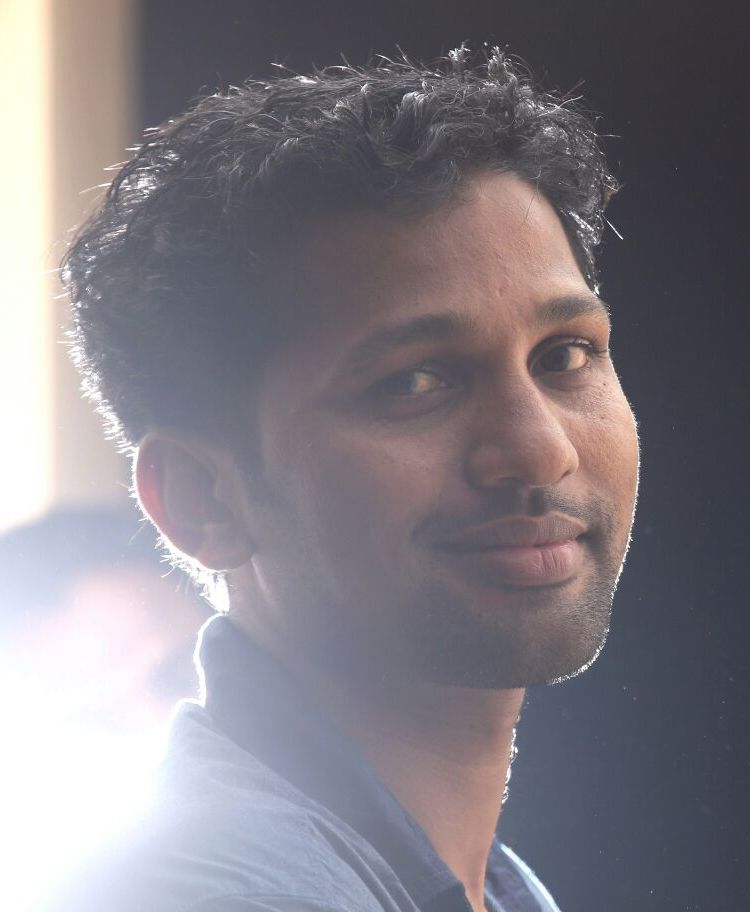
- Born: Kalichampothi, Madikai, Kasargod, Kerala, India
- Occupation: Writer
- Writing career
- Notable works: Sthalam, Kidapparasamaram, Take off

P. V. Shajikumar is a Malayalam author, screenplay writer and software engineer. He has won Kendra Sahitya Akademi's Yuva Award and Kerala Sahitya Akademi's Geeta Hiranyan Award.

== Biography ==
He married Maneesha Narayan. He ventured into writing during his college day and published his first short story collection ‘Janam’ at the age of 23. He wrote the screenplay for Kanyaka Talkies, based on his short story 18+, along with Ranjini Krishnan and K. R. Manoj The movie was screened at numerous film festivals and won award for the Best Screenplay at 14th Annual New York Indian Film Festival and the International Critics Prize (FIPRESCI Prize) for Best Malayalam Film at the 18th International Film Festival of Kerala. Forbes India magazine selected it as one among the five must watch Indian movies in 2014.

== Screenwriter ==
Title	Year	Co-writers	Notes
Kanyaka Talkies	2013	Ranjini Krishnan, K. R. Manoj	The Best Screenplay at 14th Annual New York Indian Film Festival; Selected for the competition section at the 15th edition of the Mumbai International Film Festival; Selected as the opening film at the 44th International Film Festival of India; Won FIPRESCI Award for The Best Malayalam Film at the International Film Festival of Kerala; Selected by Forbes India magazine as one of the five must watch Indian movies in 2014
Take Off	2017	Mahesh Narayan	
Puthan Panam	2017	Written by Ranjith, dialogues by P. V. Shajikumar	
The Teacher	2022	Vivek	Directed by Vivek

== Bibliography ==
Title	Year	Type	Publisher	ISBN
Janam	2006	Story	DC Books	ISBN 8126414006
Vellarippaadam	2009	Short Stories	DC Books	ISBN 9788126425150
Kalichampothiyilekku Oru Half Ticket	2011	Memoirs	Poorna Publications	
Kidapparasamaram	2012	Short Stories	Mathrubhumi Books	ISBN 978-81-8265-350-4
Ullal	2014	Short Stories	DC Books	ISBN 9788126451746
Itha Innumuthal Itha Innalevare	2017	Memoirs	DC Books	ISBN 9788126474899
Sthalam	2021	Short story	DC Books	ISBN 9789354323058
Kadhayum Kadhapathrangalum Sankalppikamalla	2021	Memoirs	Mathrubhumi Books	ISBN 9788126474899
GLP Uschool Keekamgot	2020	Stories	Chintha Publishers	
Kadha	2021	Stories	Sahithya Pravarthaka Co-operative Society Ltd.	
Janaki Undakkiya Kadhakal	2024	Children's Stories	Respond Books	
Maranavamsam	2024	Novel	Mathrubhumi Books	ISBN 9789359626284

== Awards and achievements ==
- 2023 : Abudhabi-Sakthi Award - Sthalam
- 2021 : WTP-LIve Award - Sthalam
- 2017 : Kerala Youth Icon-Literature
- 2015 : Anganam Award
- 2014 : 14th Annual New York Indian Film Festival Award for the Best Screenplay
- 2014 : C. V. Raman Smrithi Award - Kidapparasamaram
- 2013 : Kendra Sahitya Akademi's Yuva Award – Vellarippaadam
- 2012 : Vishwamalayala Mahotsavam Award
- 2009 : Kerala Sahitya Akademi's Geeta Hiranyan Award - Janam
- 2009 : Anganam-E.P. Sushama Endowment Award
