= Jo and the Boy =

- Theatrical release poster
- Directed by: Rojin Thomas
- Written by: Rojin Thomas
- Produced by: Alice George; Goodwill Entertainments
- Starring: Manju Warrier; Sanoop Santhosh; Kiran Aravindakshan; Lalu Alex; Kalaranjini
- Cinematography: Neil D'Cunha
- Edited by: Rahman Muhammed Ali
- Music by: Rahul Subrahmanian
- Distributed by: Anto Joseph Film Company
- Release date: 24 December 2015 (Kerala)
- Running time: 157 minutes
- Country: India
- Language: Malayalam

Jo and the Boy is a 2015 Indian Malayalam-language musical children's drama film directed by Rojin Thomas. It stars Manju Warrier and Sanoop Santhosh in lead roles. The music is composed by Rahul Subramaniam. The film won two awards at 2015 Kerala State Film Awards. Upon release, the film received mixed reviews.

== Plot ==
Joanne Mary a.k.a. Jo is interested in animation from childhood. Her dream is to become a well known animator and create an animation character that can interact with its fans. Her attempts to become successful in the animation field fails, but she doesn't give up. A boy named Criz shifts into the neighbourhood she stays in. She creates an animation character from Criz's mannerisms. The animation character that Joanne had created becomes popular worldwide. But problems start evolving in their friendship.

== Cast ==
- Manju Warrier as Joanne Mary a.k.a. Jo
- Sanoop Santhosh as Criz
- Kiran Aravindakshan as Appan, Jo's friend
- Lalu Alex as John Lawrence
- Kalaranjini as Mary John
- Sudheer Karamana as Tiger Bangla
- Pearle Maaney as Neethu, Jo's friend
- Rekha as Catherine
- Anil Narayan as CEO
- Rekha Menon as TV host

== Reception and Box-office ==
Jo and the Boy starring Manju Warrier and Sanoop Santhosh in lead roles did not get a strong opening in Kerala Box-office. When all other releases got at least decent start at box-office, this film failed miserably. After 6 days of run in Kerala, it was able to collect ₹2.88 crore only. After 14 days of running it collected around ₹5.63 crore with net ₹4.15 crore and ₹1.15 crore share.

== Songs ==
Music released by Muzik247

Song	Singer	Lyrics
"Ponveil Veezhave"	Haricharan	Santhosh Varma
"Do Do Do"	Manju Warrier and Sanoop Santhosh	Santhosh Varma
"Adivaraam"	Sayanora Philip	Santhosh Varma
"Pinjomal"	Arun Alat	Santhosh Varma
"Neeyen Kaataai"	Kavya Ajith	Anu Elizabath

== Rights ==
Satellite Rights : Surya TV

== Critical/Audience response ==
The film got mixed reviews from both critics and audience.

== Awards ==
2015 Kerala State Film Awards

- Won, Best Choreography - Sreejith
- Won, Best Costume Designer - Nisar Rahmath
