= Zachariayude Garbhinikal =

- Directed by: Aneesh Anwar
- Written by: Aneesh Anwar; Nizam Rawther
- Produced by: Sandra Thomas; Thomas Joseph Pattathanam; Vijay Babu
- Starring: Lal; Rima Kallingal; Sanusha; Geetha; Asha Sarath; Sandra Thomas; Aju Varghese
- Cinematography: Vishnu Narayanan
- Edited by: Renjith touchriver
- Music by: Songs: Vishnu-Sharreth; Background Score: Prashant Pillai
- Production company: Friday Film House
- Release date: 27 September 2013
- Country: India
- Language: Malayalam

Zachariayude Garbhinikal (transl. Pregnant Ladies of Zacharia) is a 2013 Indian Malayalam–language comedy-drama film written and directed by Aneesh Anwar. The film narrates the incidents in the life of a gynaecologist, and five women who come into his life. Lal appears as the gynaecologist while Rima Kallingal, Sanusha, Geetha, Asha Sarath, and Sandra Thomas play the roles of five pregnant women. Vijay Babu, Sandra Thomas, and Sandra's father, Thomas Joseph Pattathanam, produced this film under the banner of Friday Film House . The film started production in May 2013 in Kochi, Kerala.

The music track of a song in the film, "Veyil Chilla", became popular. The song has a similarity to Vangelis' theme "Conquest of Paradise". The film had a relatively new composer duo, Vishnu and Sharath, son and nephew of musician Mohan Sithara. The background score of the film was composed by Prashant Pillai.

The film won four awards at Kerala State Film Awards of 2013.Lal bagged Best Actor for the portrayal of Dr. Zacharia, Aneesh Anwar won Best Story and Special Jury Award for Best Director, and Sanusha won Special Jury Mention for her performance as Zaira.

== Plot ==
The film narrates the incidents in the life of a gynaecologist, Dr. Zacharia, and five women who come into his life, each with unconventional or illegitimate pregnancies. Lal portrays the gynaecologist and Asha Sarath the role of his wife. Sanusha plays the role of an eighteen-year-old girl who refuses to abort her child or reveal the child's father. In the end, she gives her baby to the gynaecologist and his wife who don't have children of their own. After a few months, she visits the doctor's house and leaves him a book. From reading one of the stories in the book that she specially marked, he figures out that she bore her father's child.

Rima's portrays the role of Fathima, a nurse, while Geetha plays an elderly woman who gets pregnant through artificial insemination. Aju Varghese appears as Ajmal who has strong feelings for Fathima. However, due to their height difference, he is unable to confide his love for her. Sandra Thomas plays the role of another expectant woman who bears her boyfriend's child, and she wants to deliver only if her husband dies. Joy Mathew acts as her husband.

== Cast ==
- Lal as Dr. Zacharia
- Sanusha as Zaira
- Asha Sarath as Susan
- Rima Kallingal as Fathima
- Geetha as Sister Jasmine Jennifer
- Aju Varghese as Ajmal aka Aju, Fatima's lover
- Sandra Thomas as Anuradha
- Shanavas as Gafoor, Zaira's father
- Devi Ajith as Laila, Zaira's Mother
- Joy Mathew as Shashankan, Anuradha's husband
- Unni Rajan P. Dev as Iqbal aka Ikku
- Raveendran
- Vijay Menon as Doctor Chandykunju
- Shivaji Guruvayoor as Cleetus, Sis. Jasmine's relative
- Rizabawa
- Kochu Preman
- Ponnamma Babu
- Sajid Yahiya as singer on the track "Veyil Chilla"

== Controversy ==
The film courted controversy for showing animation in the climax scene based on Padmarajan's short story, "Moovanthy". Following a complaint against the makers for copyright infringement, the court issued an order prohibiting the satellite telecast of the movie.
