= Aneesh Anwar =

Indian film director

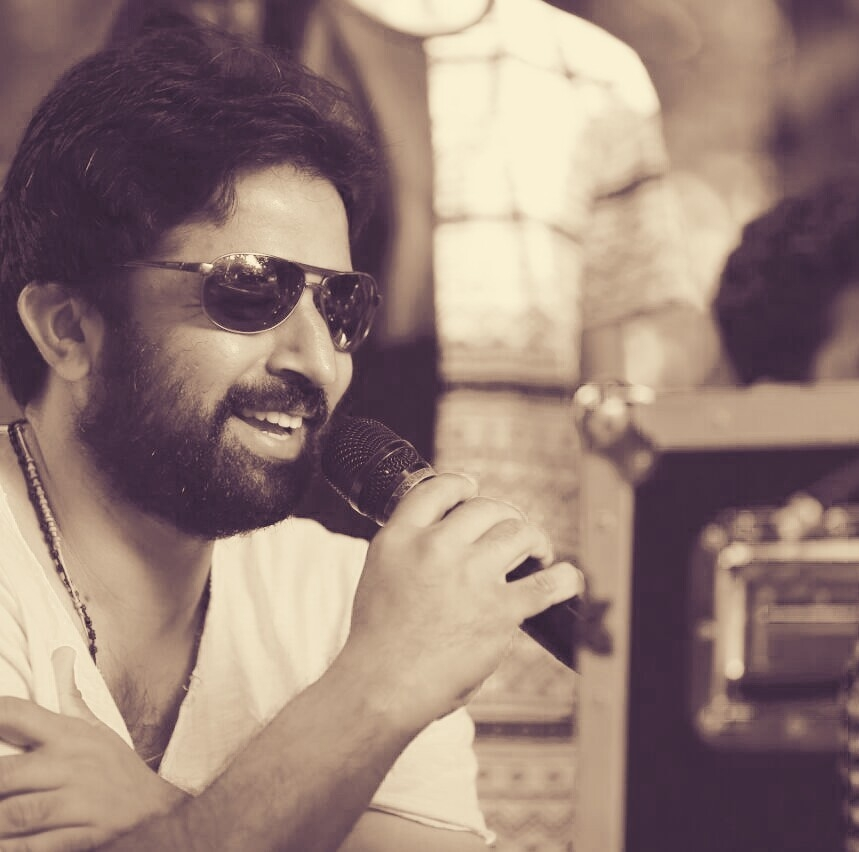
- Born: 30 June 1981 (age 45); Thalassery, Kerala, India
- Occupations: Director; screenwriter; lyricist
- Years active: 2000–present

Aneesh Anwar is an Indian film director, screenwriter and lyricist who works in Malayalam films.

== Early life ==
Anwar was born in Thalassery, Kerala. He completed his schooling in Jawaharlal Nehru GHSS, Mahe and graduated from Mahatma College in Thalassery.

== Career ==
Anwar started his film career in 2000 as an associate director with prominent filmmakers such as Joshiy and Bhadran. He started off with Joshiy's Dubai and went on to assist him for films such as Praja (2001), Mampazhakalam (2004), Runway (2004), and Naran (2005).

Anwar made his directorial debut with the film Mullamottum Munthiricharum (2012) starring Indrajith Sukumaran, Meghana Raj, and Ananya in the lead roles. The film was met with mostly negative reviews. He rose to higher acclaim with his second film, Zachariayude Garbhinikal (2013), which was well received by critics. The film received 4 awards at the Kerala State Film Awards that year. His third film, Kumbasaram, was released in 2015, and received mixed reviews. Jayasurya's performance in the film was applauded by critics.

== Filmography ==
Year	Film	Notes
2012	Mullamottum Munthiricharum	
2013	Zachariayude Garbhinikal	
2015	Kumbasaram	
2016	Basheerinte Premalekhanam	
2019	My Great Grandfather	
2023	Raastha	

== Awards and nominations ==
Year	Award	Film	Notes
2014	Kerala State Film Award for Best Story	Zachariayude Garbhinikal	
2014	Kerala State Film Award for Best Director (Special Jury)	Zachariayude Garbhinikal	
