= Kuttikalundu Sookshikkuka =

- Theatrical release poster
- Directed by: Kalavoor Ravikumar
- Written by: Kalavoor Ravikumar
- Produced by: Mohanan G.
- Starring: Sanoop Santhosh; Siddharth Ajith; Anoop Menon; Bhavana; Anumol
- Cinematography: P. Sukumar
- Edited by: Dileep Dennis
- Music by: Bijibal
- Production company: M. Star Satellite Communications
- Distributed by: AJ Film Company
- Release date: 2 December 2016 (India)
- Country: India
- Language: Malayalam

Kuttikalundu Sookshikkuka is a 2016 Indian Malayalam-language family thriller film written and directed by Kalavoor Ravikumar and produced by Mohanan G. It stars Sanoop Santhosh, Siddharth Ajith, Anoop Menon, Bhavana and Makarand Deshpande in lead roles.

== Plot ==
A family that contains commando Gautham Keshav (Anoop Menon), his wife Shahida (Bhavana) and two school-going children Niranjan (Sanoop Santhosh) and Neeraj (Siddharth Ajith). The peaceful existence of the family is ousted after Gautham is killed by a group of terrorists.

As Shahida puts on a brave front to lead a normal life for the children, the two children decide to retaliate for the demise of their dad after recognizing Kareem Ustad (Makarand Deshpande), the leader of the terrorists amid a school trip. During the terrorists case investigation, Merin (Anumol) helps the family out. The boys keeps Kareem hostage and tells him that they will get him revenge on Indian Independence Day. They put posters to remind him. During scenes, they cry over their dead father. They plan to hoist the flag and burn Kareem to death. They hoist the flag, ask him to say the line (Bharath Matha Ki Jai), then they salute the flag. But, Kareem tries to kill Niranjan. Then, Neeraj sprays a chloroform oxidised liquid onto Kareem's face. Merin and Shahida finds the boys and Kareem. Kareem gets arrested and they are presented with an award, and are congratulated by the ones present in the room, including their grandpa and grandma and Gautham. It ends with a salute to soldiers, for protecting our nation.

== Cast ==
- Sanoop Santhosh as Niranjan Keshav Khadar
- Siddharth Ajith as Neeraj Keshav Khadar
- Anoop Menon as Major Gautham Keshav
- Bhavana as Shahida Keshav
- Anumol as ACP Merin Mathew IPS
- Makarand Deshpande as Kareem Ustaad
- Sadiq as Abdul Khadar
- Shaju Sreedhar as Chandramohan
- Sohan Seenulal as Nandakumar
- Zhinz Shan as Usman

== Production ==
The film began production in July 2016, with Kalavoor Ravikumar opting to direct the film, produced by Mohanan G and starring Anoop Menon in the lead role.

Choreographer of this movie is Sajnanajam.

== Soundtrack ==
Music is composed by Bijibal.

1. "Himagiri" - Prabha Varma
2. "Dhoore Vaanil" - Prabha Varma
