= Mei Hoom Moosa =

2022 film directed by Jibu Jacob

- Theatrical release poster
- Directed by: Jibu Jacob
- Written by: Rubesh Rain
- Produced by: CJ Roy; Thomas Thiruvalla
- Starring: Suresh Gopi; Hareesh Kanaran; Ashwini Reddy; Poonam Bajwa; Saiju Kurup; Srinda
- Cinematography: Vishnu Narayanan
- Edited by: Sooraj E. S.
- Music by: Sreenath Sivasankaran
- Production companies: Confident Group; Thomas Thiruvalla Films
- Release date: 30 September 2022
- Running time: 138 minutes
- Country: India
- Language: Malayalam

Mei Hoom Moosa (transl. I am Moosa) is a 2022 Indian Malayalam-language satire comedy film directed by Jibu Jacob and written by Rubesh Rain. Produced by Dr. Roy C. J. and Thomas Thiruvalla under the banners of Confident Group and Thomas Thiruvalla Films, the film stars Suresh Gopi in the lead role while Poonam Bajwa and Saiju Kurup play prominent supporting roles. Sreenath Sivasankaran composed the film's music, and the cinematography was handled by Vishnu Narayanan.

Principal photography commenced in April 2022. Mei Hoom Moosa was released in cinemas on 30 September 2022. The film received positive reviews upon its release and also a theatrical success.

== Plot ==
Lance naik Muhammad Moosa, an Indian army soldier returns to his hometown in Kerala, after spending nineteen years in a Pakistani jail. On his homecoming, he finds that the entire world has presumed him to be dead during the Kargil War. How Moosa sets about to prove his identity while also trying to come to terms with everything that has happened around him during his time behind bars, forms the plot of the story.

== Cast ==
- Suresh Gopi as Lance Naik Muhammad Moosa, later Honorary Captain
  - Mohammed Shariq as Young Moosa
- Hareesh Kanaran as Thaami
- Ashwini Reddy as Lexi
- Poonam Bajwa as Kunjipaathu
- Saiju Kurup as Meeran
- Srinda as Suhara
- Salim Kumar as Adv. Manoharan
- Mithun Ramesh as Basheer
- Major Ravi as DSC Officer Raveendran
- Sudheer Karamana as SI Anto Sunny
- Jubil Rajan P. Dev as CI Ullas Kumar
- Veena Nair as P. P. Pankajam
- Arunsol as Ambrose
- Saran S Raj as Ikru
- Jijina as Amina
- Pramod Kozhikode as Captain Raju

== Production ==
Principal photography of the film commenced on 21 April 2022 at Kodungallur, Kerala. It was reported that an initial filming had also been completed in North India. Filming had taken place across Kargil, Poonch, Delhi, Jaipur, Ponnani, Malappuram and the Wagah border in Punjab. The entire filming was completed by July 2022.

== Release ==
=== Theatrical ===
The film has its theatrical release on 30 September 2022. It was subsequently acquired by ZEE5 for a digital release on November 11, 2022.

== Reception ==
=== Critical reception ===
S.R. Praveen, critic of The Hindu, stated that, " Suresh Gopi caught in lacklustre treatment of a decent subject." Princy Alexander, critic from Onmanorama, wrote that, "Saiju Kurup as Moosa's younger brother and Major Ravi as an Army official put up a good performance."
