= Sandra Thomas =

Indian film producer and actress

- Born: Kottayam, Kerala, India
- Occupations: Film producer; Actor
- Years active: 2011–present
- Known for: Friday Film House
- Spouse: Wilson John Thomas
- Children: 2

Sandra Thomas is an Indian film producer and actress. She is best known for her roles in Amen and Zachariayude Garbhinikal, also as the producer of Zachariayude Garbhinikal and Philips and the Monkey Pen.

Sandra, along with producer Vijay Babu founded the film-production company Friday Film House, but she got in conflict with Vijay Babu and withdrew from Friday Film House and started her own production company named Sandra Thomas Productions.

== Personal life ==
She married Wilson John Thomas in July 2016. The couple welcomed twin daughters in 2018.

== Friday Film House ==
The film Friday (2012) was the crux of Sandra's career and also turned to be for Friday Film House, owned along with actor Vijay Babu. Though the company got established after the release of Friday, the movie is considered as the first production venture of Friday Film House.

On 3 January 2017, the founders had a quarrel with each other in their office after which Sandra filed a case against Vijay Babu. Later both declared that it was a misunderstanding and that Sandra had taken a break from the industry. She started her own production company named Sandra Thomas Productions.

== Filmography ==
Year	Film	Credited as			Notes
Year	Film	Actor	Producer	Role	Notes
1991	Nettippattam	Yes			
1991	Mimics Parade	Yes			
1991	Cheppukilukkana Changathi	Yes			
1993	O' Faby	Yes			
1996	Kanjirappally Kariachan	Yes		Lisymol	
1999	Olympian Anthony Adam	Yes			
2012	Friday		Yes		First production venture.
2013	Kili Poyi	Yes		Radhika	
2013	Amen	Yes		Mariyamma	
2013	Zachariayude Garbhinikal	Yes	Yes	Anuradha	
2013	Philips and the Monkey Pen		Yes		
2014	Peruchazhi	Yes	Yes	Sunny's wife	
2015	Aadu	Yes	Yes	Menaka Kanthan	
2015	Adi Kapyare Kootamani		Yes		
2016	Aakashvani	Yes		Mariya	
2016	Mudhugauv		Yes		
2022	Kallan D'Souza		Yes		
2023	Nalla Nilavulla Rathri	No	Yes		

- 2016 : Theatrical Rights/Distribution - Theri

== Television career ==
List of television appearances

Year	Title	Channel	Notes
2013	I Personally	Kappa TV	Herself
2014	Page 3	Kappa TV	Model
2014	Hello Namasthey	Mazhavil Manorama	Herself
2014	Cinema Company	Kaumudy TV	Herself
2015	Big Screen	Kairali TV	Herself
2015	Ivide Ingananu Bhai	Mazhavil Manorama	Herself
2015	Take it Easy	Mazhavil Manorama	Herself
2015	Onnum Onnum Moonu	Mazhavil Manorama	Herself
2015	Adi Kapyare Koottamani Christmas Special	Mazhavil Manorama	Herself
2015	Star Jam	Kappa TV	Herself
2016	Home Minister	Amrita TV	Producer; Mentor
2016	JB Junction	Kairali TV	Herself
2016	Star Ragging	Kairali TV	Herself
2017	Day with a Star	Kaumudy TV	Herself
2017	Dream Drive	Kaumudy TV	Herself
2019	Vakku Maruvakku	Amrita TV	Herself
2020	Star Magic	Flowers TV	Mentor
2020	Real to Reel	Kaumudy TV	Herself
2020	Mr. & Mrs.	Zee Keralam	Mentor
2021	Onanilavum Thangakolusum	24 News	Herself
2021	Sandramayi Onam	Asianet News	Herself
2022	Njangalude Malakhamar	Janam TV	Herself

== Awards ==
Kerala State Film Awards

- 2014 – Special Jury Award for Philips and the Monkey Pen
- 2013 – Kerala State Film Award for Best Children's Film
