= Sanoop Santhosh =

Indian actor

- Born: Kannur, Kerala, India
- Occupation: Actor
- Years active: 2013–2018(child artist); 2026–present
- Parents: Santhosh; Usha
- Relatives: Sanusha (Sister)

Sanoop Santhosh is an Indian actor from the Malayalam film industry.

Sanoop made his acting debut in Philips and the Monkey Pen, a 2013 Malayalam language experimental & children's film. He played the role of Ryan Philip, the movie turned out to be a decent hit.

Sanoop was born to Santhosh and Usha on 12 December 2003 in Pallikkunnu in Kannur. He attended Sreepuram English Medium And Junior College, Kannur. He is the younger brother of actress Sanusha.

== Filmography ==
Year	Title	Role	Notes
2013	Kutteem Kolum		Debut film
2013	Philips and the Monkey Pen	Ryan Philip	
2014	Peruchazhi	Ryan Philip	Guest appearance
2015	Bhaskar the Rascal	Aadi	
2015	Jo and the Boy	Criz	
2016	Kuttikalundu Sookshikkuka	Niranjan Keshav	
2017	Munthirivallikal Thalirkkumbol	Jerry	
2018	Johny Johny Yes Appa	Adam	
2026	Kathanar – The Wild Sorcerer †	TBA	

== Awards ==
Year	Ceremony	Category	Film	Result
2014	2013 Kerala State Film Awards	Best Child Artist	Philips and the Monkey Pen	Won
2014	Kerala Film Critics Association Awards	Best Child Artist	Philips and the Monkey Pen	Won
2014	South Indian International Movie Awards	SIIMA Award for Best Debutant(Male)-Malayalam	Philips and the Monkey Pen	Nominated
2014	South Indian International Movie Awards	Best Child Actor	Philips and the Monkey Pen	Won
2014	Asiavision Awards	Best Child Actor	Philips and the Monkey Pen	Won
2014	Asianet Film Awards	Best Child Artist - Male	Philips and the Monkey Pen	Won
2014	Vanitha Film Awards 2014	Best New Face	Philips and the Monkey Pen	Won
