= Avarude Raavukal =

Avarude Ravukal
- Theatrical release poster
- Directed by: Shanil Muhammed
- Written by: Shanil Muhammed
- Produced by: Ajay Krishnan
- Starring: Asif Ali; Unni Mukundan; Vinay Forrt; Honey Rose; Milana Nagaraj; Nedumudi Venu; Lena
- Cinematography: Vishnu Narayan
- Edited by: Prejish Prakash
- Music by: Sankar Sharma
- Distributed by: Sopanam Entertainments
- Release date: 23 June 2017
- Country: India
- Language: Malayalam

Avarude Ravukal is a 2017 Indian Malayalam-language film written and directed by Shanil Muhammed (in his directorial debut). It features Asif Ali, Unni Mukundan, Vinay Forrt, Honey Rose, Milana Nagaraj, and Nedumudi Venu. It was produced by Ajay Krishnan under the banner of Ajay entertainments. The film was released on 23 June 2017 to mixed reviews.

== Plot ==
The film follows three youngsters from different places and their search for a new life in Cochin City. Ashik, Sidharth, and Vijay stay together in the house of an old man named Scobo Jones for free by solving a puzzle. How Jones teaches them that there are two ways to approach any problem and that often only one path, that too with repetitive effort, will turn struggling events into unexpected bliss forms the plot of the movie.

== Cast ==
- Asif Ali as Aashik Pattavayal / Aashiq Abu
- Unni Mukundan as Siddharth Gopan
- Vinay Forrt as Vijay Krishnan
- Nedumudi Venu as Scobo Jones
- Honey Rose as Shivani Jayan, senior manager at Blue Seven Star
- Lena as Deepa Manoj
- Milana Nagaraj as Meghna
- Aju Varghese as Vinod Mannarkkad, A Junior Artist
- Mukesh as Manoj Kuruvila, film director
- Kochu Preman as Dr.Jayamurugan, psychiatrist at JM Clinic
- Vinitha Koshy as Mareena
- Nisha Sarang as Bindhu Jayamurugan
- Ambika Mohan as Siddharth's mother
- Prashanth Alexander As Buji Pattavayal
- Sudhi Koppa As Assistant Director
- Kiran Aravindakshan as Advocate
- Aishwarya Chandran
- Sunny Wayne as Sunny (Cameo)
- Shine Tom Chacko as Shine (Cameo)
- Sanju Sivram as Sanju (Cameo)
- Gokulan As Pattavayal Sasi
- Anand Gopinathan As Sam
- Santosh Sleeba As Cricket Commentator
- Jithan V Soubhagom as Library Buji

== Production ==
In 2015 Shanil Muhammed, who earlier directed the Malayalam children's film, Philips and the Monkey Pen, announced the film titled Avarude Ravukal with Asif Ali, Unni Mukundan, and Honey Rose in the lead roles. The shooting of the film held at Kochi, Salem, Attappadi, Munnar and Vagamon.

The film's producer, Ajay Krishnan, committed suicide on 24 April 2016, a month before the scheduled release of the film. It was widely reported that the producer was unhappy after watching the preview of the film and was also having some financial problems. Ajay's girlfriend Vineetha Nair also committed suicide a week after Ajay's death. Ajay's untimely death delayed the release of the film and it was released one year later on 23 June 2017.
