= Vellimoonga =

- Theatrical release poster
- Directed by: Jibu Jacob
- Written by: Joji Thomas
- Produced by: Shashidharan Ullattil; Ex-Producer Sonu Singh
- Starring: Biju Menon
- Narrated by: Lal Jose
- Cinematography: Vishnu Narayanan
- Edited by: Sooraj E. S.
- Music by: Bijibal
- Production companies: Ullattil Visual Media Release and Indian movies uk & Tricolor Entertainments
- Distributed by: Manorama Music Entertainment
- Release date: 25 September 2014; (India)
- Running time: 130 minutes
- Country: India
- Language: Malayalam
- Budget: ₹2.8 crore
- Box office: ₹20 crore

Vellimoonga (transl. Barn Owl) is a 2014 Indian Malayalam-language political satire film directed by Jibu Jacob (in his directorial debut) and written by Joji Thomas. It stars Biju Menon in the lead role with Aju Varghese, Nikki Galrani, Tini Tom, K. P. A. C. Lalitha, Sasi Kalinga, Saju Navodaya, Kalabhavan Shajon, Veena Nair, and Siddique in supporting roles. Asif Ali appears in a cameo role. The music was composed by Bijibal.

The film was released on 25 September 2014 in 60 centres across Kerala. It became one of the highest-grossing Malayalam films of 2014 with ticket sales estimated at ₹20 crore (US$2.1 million). The movie was remade in Tamil in 2016 as Muthina Kathirika.

== Plot ==
Mamachan is an unmarried politician in his forties. He works in a relatively unknown party based in North India that barely has any presence in Kerala. He is subject to taunts and retorts to this though he is the national leader of the party he belongs to.

Well known for his cunning and slimy tactics, Mamachan has his share of haters in the village, Karthikapuram. Mamachan eventually decides to get married and visits a prospective bride, only to be chased away by the bride's father Wareed as Mamachan and the bride's mother Mollykutty were classmates and friends during their teens and Mamachan had slapped Wareed once when he tried to woo Mollykutty.

Mamachan in an attempt to get serious in life decides to progress his political career after he is taunted for being a good-for-nothing lazing around in a party without any scope or future. He visits Delhi and is instructed to stand in elections with the understanding that if he loses his election deposit in Kerala, he will be elevated to a role in the center which is viewed with jealousy by his colleague, Gopi.

Gopi decides it is better to let Mamachan win in Irikkur constituency and stay as a legislator rather than lose and move to Delhi for a better role. Gopi subsequently rallies all of Mamachan's rivals together to work for Mamachan's victory so that they can prevent him from going to Delhi which results in Mamachan's victory in the polls. Only after the elections, it is revealed that everything was Mamachan's plans to win the election as a legislator, making others work for his victory, and that there was nothing for him in Delhi.

Mamachan's prospective bride's alliance is fixed with a guy from Mumbai named Charlie who disappears on the day of the wedding. To save the bride and her family's honor, Mamachan is requested by the village elders and priest to marry her. After the marriage, Charlie appears and reveals he was Mamachan's friend and his disappearance was a part of a plan by Mamachan to marry her. Both are shown to be happily married and moving on after that.

The story is based on some real-life observations written by Joji Thomas who is a native of Karthikapuram.

== Cast ==
- Biju Menon as MLA C.P. Mamachan
  - Rohith Menon as Young Mamachan
- Asif Ali as Charlie/Jose Kutty Pala
- Aju Varghese as Tony Vakkathanam/Pachan
- Nikki Galrani as Lisa Wareed
- Tini Tom as V.P. Jose, Panchayath Vice-president
- K. P. A. C. Lalitha as Annakutty, Mammachan's mother
- Siddique as Kunnel Wareed
- Lena as Mollykutty Wareed
- Veena Nair as Sholi Mathew, Udayagiri Panchayat president
- Sunil Sukhada as Father Paulouse Karakkunam
- Saju Navodaya as Mathew / Kochappi
- Sasi Kalinga as Velayudhan
- Kalabhavan Shajon as Gopi
- Dr. Midhula Sebastian as Manju Pappan
- Anu Joseph as Sally Cherian P.
- Basil as Tom Cherian
- Geetha Salam as K.P. Joseph
- Chembil Ashokan as Maniyanikuttichan
- Shivaji Guruvayoor as Communist party leader
- Baby Rachael as a young girl
- Mukesh as a voter (archived footage)

== Reception ==
Vellimoonga received positive reviews upon release. Nowrunning.com gave 4.5/5 and called it a "surprise winner".

Sify reported that Vellimoonga had a good opening and called the film an "instant hit". The film became one of the highest grossing Malayalam film of the year, with a box office collection estimated at ₹20 crore (US$2.1 million). It also earned ₹4.5 crore (US$470,000) from satellite rights.

The film won the Kerala Film Critics Association Award for Best Popular Film in 2014. Tini Tom won the Asianet Film Award for Best Supporting Actor for this film in 2014.

The film was remade in Tamil as Muthina Kathirika by Sundar C

== Soundtrack ==
Vellimoonga

Soundtrack album by Bijibal
- Released: 21 September 2014
- Recorded: 2014
- Genre: Film soundtrack
- Language: Malayalam
- Label: Manorama Music
- Producer: Bijibal

Track	Song title	Lyricist	Singer(s)
1	"Vellimoonga"	Santhosh Varma	Lola, Daya, Thamanna, Swathi, Dev
2	"Punchiri Kannulla"	Rajeev Nair	Ganesh Sundaram
3	"Mavelikku Shesham"	Santhosh Varma	Najim Arshad
4	"Punchiri Kannulla"	Rajeev Nair	Vijay Yesudas
