= Philips and the Monkey Pen =

- Theatrical release poster
- Directed by: Rojin Thomas; Shanil Muhammed
- Screenplay by: Rojin Thomas
- Story by: Shanil Muhammed
- Produced by: Sandra Thomas; Vijay Babu
- Starring: Sanoop Santhosh; Jayasurya
- Cinematography: Neil D'Cunha
- Edited by: Prejish Prakash
- Music by: Rahul Subrahmaniam
- Production company: Friday Film House
- Distributed by: Friday Tickets & PJ Entertainments Europe
- Release date: 2 November 2013
- Running time: 140 minutes
- Country: India
- Language: Malayalam

Philips and the Monkey Pen is a 2013 Indian Malayalam language coming-of-age comedy drama film written by Rojin Thomas and directed by Rojin Thomas and Shanil Muhammed (in their directorial debut). The film stars Sanoop Santhosh, Jayasurya and Remya Nambeesan.

The film revolves around a ten-year-old called Ryan Philip (Sanoop Santhosh) and his adventures with a magical pen called the Monkey Pen. The film was produced by Vijay Babu and actress Sandra Thomas under Friday Film House banner. Neil D’Cunha is the cinematographer and the music has been scored by Remya Nambeesan's brother, Rahul Subrahmaniam.

The film released on 2 November 2013 coinciding with Diwali in Kerala. The film completed 111 days in theaters and was a commercial success at the box-office. The film won Kerala State Film Award for Best Children's Film and Kerala State Film Award for Best Child Artist (Sanoop Santhosh).

The character Ryan Philip and his team reappeared in the 2014 film Peruchazhi.

== Plot ==
Ryan Philip is a smart cute school boy who has problems understanding maths. As he struggles to escape from doing his maths homework, he resorts to mischievous acts, including stabbing his classmate named Decimal, using a pencil, in an ego clash. He is not realizing the trouble he is making. He has a good relationship with his dad Roy Philip and mother Sameera and Ryan's grandfather Richard Philip, who is an antique collector. On visiting his grandfather's house, Ryan gets a magical pen called monkey pen. This monkey pen does his maths homework and soon changes his whole life.

After many circumstances and the death of Ryan's girlfriend Joan in a school bus accident, Ryan's life changes in a surprising way. The hatred relationship between his maths teacher Pappan and him changes when he does the homework regularly and he and his friends try hard for a maths exhibition and fail. Pappan gets a transfer because of Ryan's doing earlier to trap him. But he regrets later and confess to the teacher at the farewell. At last, Ryan understands that the one who had been doing his maths homework was not the monkey pen but his father. In the credits scene, it is shown Ryan studying the multiplication table.

== Cast ==
- Sanoop Santhosh as Ryan Philip
- Jayasurya as Roy Philip
- Remya Nambeesan as Sameera Philip
- Joy Mathew as Captain Richard Philip
- Mukesh as Principal Charles Leon
- Innocent as God
- Diya as Joann Joseph
- Gourav Menon as Jahangir R (Jugru)
- Aakhash Santhosh as Rama Ramana Rajeeva Nandanan (Raman)
- Antony Elrin D'Silva as Innocent P. Varghese
- Nidheesh Boban as Decimal K John
- Augen as Kannan (7up)
- Mathew Joy as Rahul
- Vijay Babu as Padmachandran (Pappan)
- Pradeep Kottayam as Pavithran
- Kiran Aravindakshan as Joan's Father
- Dean Rowlins as Robert Bristow
- Sudheer Karamana as John, Decimal's Father
- Sasi Kalinga as Moorthy
- Nikhita Naiyer as Joan's friend
- Chemban Vinod Jose as SI Varghese (cameo appearance)

== Critical reception ==
Philips and the Monkey Pen got very much positive reviews from critics and other audiences.

Deccan Chronicle gave 3.5/5 rating and said, "This, to date, must surely rate as the year's top contender of the prestigious Swarna Kamal for the Best Children's Film. It lights up the righteous path without being preachy. When a son says to his father, "I thought the truth would pain you", the wise one smiles, inspiringly, "The truth isn't bitter; it is the lies that are excessively sweet"."

== Awards ==
- Kerala State Film Award for Best Children's Film
- Kerala State Film Award for Best Children's Film Director- Rojin Thomas and Shanil Muhammed
- Kerala State Film Award for Best Child Artist - Sanoop Santhosh
- Kerala Film Critics Award for Best Child Artist
- Kerala Film Critics Award for Best Children Film

== Soundtrack ==
The film's soundtrack contains 6 songs, all composed by Rahul Subrahmanian. Lyrics by Anu Elizabeth Jose, Sibi Padiyara, and Mamtha Seemanth.

#	Title	Singer(s)
1	"Vinnile Thaarakam"	Arun Alat
2	"En Kanimalare [F]"	Neha Venugopal
3	"Baalyathil"	Remya Nambeesan
4	"En Kanimalare [M]"	Sachin Warrier
5	"It's Just Another Day"	Shaan Rahman
6	"Kanavukalil"	Najim Arshad
