= Jibu Jacob =

Indian cinematographer and director

- Born: Njarackal, Kerala, India
- Occupations: Cinematographer; director
- Years active: 2002–present
- Notable work: Vellimoonga (2014); Munthirivallikal Thalirkkumbol (2017)

Jibu Jacob is an Indian cinematographer and director working in Malayalam film industry. He debuted as a cinematographer in 2002 with the crime film Stop Violence. After a decade long career as a cinematographer, he made his debut as a director in 2014 with the political satire film Vellimoonga. His most recent directorial Mei Hoom Moosa released in September 2022.

== Film career ==
After a short stint as an assistant cinematographer in Malayalam film industry, he made his independent debut in cinematography with the 2002 crime film Stop Violence directed by A. K. Sajan. Later he worked in a number of Malayalam films as a cinematographer until 2013. He debuted as a director with the comical political satire film Vellimoonga (2014) starring Biju Menon, which was both a critical and commercial success. His second directorial was Munthirivallikal Thalirkkumbol, starring Mohanlal. It is a comedy family film released in January 2017, it became one of the highest-grossing Malayalam films of all time. He has acted in 2015 movie, Ben in a character role.

== Filmography ==
Key
†	Denotes films that have not yet been released

Year	Title	Credited as	Notes	Ref.
2002	Stop Violence	Cinematographer		
2005	Deepangal Sakshi	Cinematographer		
2005	The Campus	Cinematographer		
2005	December	Cinematographer		
2005	Boy Friend	Cinematographer		
2005	Thaskaraveeran	Cinematographer		
2006	Raashtram	Cinematographer		
2006	Oruvan	Cinematographer		
2007	Anaamika	Cinematographer		
2007	Pranayakalam	Cinematographer		
2007	Heart Beats (film)	Cinematographer		
2008	De Ingottu Nokkiye	Cinematographer		
2008	Shakespeare M.A. Malayalam	Cinematographer		
2009	Oru Black and White Kudumbam	Cinematographer		
2009	Kanmazha Peyyum Munpe	Cinematographer		
2010	Sakudumbam Shyamala	Cinematographer		
2010	Rama Ravana	Cinematographer		
2010	Oru Small Family	Cinematographer		
2011	Mohabbath	Cinematographer		
2012	Cinema Company	Cinematographer		
2013	Rebecca Uthup Kizhakkemala	Cinematographer		
2013	Bharya Athra Pora	Cinematographer		
2014	Vellimoonga	Director		
2017	Munthirivallikal Thalirkkumbol	Director		
2019	Adhyarathri	Director		
2021	Ellam Sheriyakum	Director		
2022	Mei Hoom Moosa	Director		
2023	Kurukkan	Cinematographer		

== As an actor ==
Year	Title	Role	Notes
2015	Ben		
2019	Vattameshasammelanam		
2021	Sara's	Producer	
2023	Pappachan Olivilanu	C.I Sebastian Paul	
2024	Thaanara		
