= List of Malayalam films of 2002 =

== List of released films ==
Title	Director	Cast
Punyam	Rajesh Narayanan	Lakshmi Gopalaswamy, Boban Alummoodan
Kayamkulam Kanaran	Nissar	Kottayam Nazeer, Jagathy Sreekumar, Janardhanan
Krishna Pakshakkilikal	K. J. Abraham Lincoln	Sai Kumar, Master Amal Mohan
Thirunelliyile Penkutty		
Neythukaran	Priyanandanan	Murali, Vijayaraghavan, Sona Nair
Jagathy Jagadeesh in Town	Nizar	Jagathy Sreekumar, Jagadish
Yaamam		
Kakke Kakke Koodevide	P. Rajashegharan	Vijaya Raghavan, Geethu Mohandas
Kakki Nakshatram	Vinay P. Nayar	Nishanth Sagar, Jagadish, Charmila
Mazhathullikkilukkam	Akbar Jose	Dileep, Navya Nair, Bharathi, Sharadha
Malayali Mamanu Vanakkam	Rajasenan	Jayaram, Prabhu, Roja, Kalabhavan Mani
www.anukudumbam.com	O. S. Gireesh	Suresh Gopi, Jagathy Sreekumar
Adheena	Krishnadas	Kasthuri, Janardhanan, Indrans
Phantom	Biju Varkey	Mammootty, Malavika, Lalu Alex, Manoj K Jayan
Kuberan	Sundardas	Dileep, Samyukhtha Varma, Uma Shankari
Oomappenninu Uriyadappayyan	Vinayan	Jayasurya, Kavya Madhavan, Indrajith
Pakalppooram	Anil Babu	Mukesh, Geethu Mohandas, Salim Kumar
Krishna Gopalakrishna	Balachandra Menon	Balachandra Menon, Manoj K. Jayan, Geethu Mohandas
Kanmashi	V. M. Vinu	Vineeth Kumar, Nithya Das, Kalabhavan Mani
Onnaman	Thampi Kannamthanam	Mohanlal, Ramya Krishnan, Kavya Madhavan, Biju Menon
Bhavam	Sathish Menon	Murali Menon, Jyothirmayi, Siddique
Puthooramputhri Unniyarcha	P. G. Vishwambharan	Kunchako Boban, Vani Viswanath, Jomol
Savithriyude Aranjanam	Mohan Kupleri	Harisree Asokan, Aswathy
Mankolangal		
Shivam	Shaji Kailas	Biju Menon, Nandini, Sai Kumar
Kashillatheyum Jeevikkam	Jose Puthussery	Manuraj, Jagathy Sreekumar
Kanal Kireedam	K. Srikuttan	Napoleon, Sangeetha
Meesa Madhavan	Lal Jose	Dileep, Kavya Madhavan, Jagathy Sreekumar, Indrajith
Avarkkai Aruldas		
Chirikkudukka	Saji T. S.	Jayachandran, Jagadeesh, Deepthi Prasad, Cochin Haneefa
Thandavam	Shaji Kailas	Mohanlal, Kiran Rathod, Jagathy Sreekumar
India Gate	T. S. Saji	Vani Viswanath, Jagadish
Desam	Biju V. Nair	Premkumar, Madhupal, Anitha
Ellam Ninakku Vendi		
Snehadooth	D. Madhu	Madhupal, Sarath
Nizhalkuthu	Adoor Gopalakrishnan	Oduvil Unnikrishnan, Narain, Sukumari
Nakshathrakkannulla Rajakumaran Avanundoru Rajakumari	Rajasenan	Prithviraj, Gayatri Raghuram, Kalabhavan Mani
Kaiyethum Doorath	Fazil	Fahadh Faasil, Nikitha, Revathi
Sesham	T. K. Rajeev Kumar	Jayaram, Geethu Mohandas, Biju Menon
Ente Hridayathinte Udama	Bharath Gopi	Lal, Vani Viswanath, Jagathy Sreekumar
Bamboo Boys	Ali Akbar	Kalabhavan Mani, Harishree Ashokan, Cochin Haneefa
Kunjikkoonan	Sasisankar	Dileep, Navya Nair, Manya
Thilakam	Jayaraj	Saji Soman, Jagathy Sreekumar, Uma Shankari
Pranayamanithooval	Thulasidas	Vineeth Kumar, Jayasurya, Gopika
Stop Violence	A. K. Sajan	Prithviraj, Chandra Lakshman, Vijayaraghavan
Swapna Halliyil Orunaal	Gopalji	Krishnakumar, Narendra Prasad
Aabharanacharthu	I. V. Sasi	Sarath, Narendra Prasad, Indrans
Kattuchembakam	Vinayan	Jayasurya, Charmy Kaur, Anoop Menon
Ee Bhargavi Nilayam	Benny P. Thomas	Vani Viswanath, Suresh Krishna
Valkannadi	Anil Babu	Kalabhavan Mani, Geethu Mohandas
Yathrakarude Sradhakku	Sathyan Anthikkad	Jayaram, Soundarya, Innocent
Chathurangam	K. Madhu	Mohanlal, Naghma, Navya Nair, Sai Kumar, Lalu Alex
Kalyararaman	Shafi	Dileep, Navya Nair, Lal, Kunchakko Boban, Jyothirmayi
Nandanam	Ranjith	Prithviraj, Navya Nair, Revathi, Kaviyoor Ponnamma, Aravind Akash
Nammal	Kamal	Jishnu Raghavan, Siddharth, Bhavana, Renuka Menon, Suhasini
Videsi Nair Swadesi Nair	Poulson	Jagadish
Snehithan	Jose Thomas	Kunchacko Boban, Preetha Vijaykumar, Nandana
Kalachakram	Sonu Sisupal	Shiju, Devan, Siddhique, Jagadeesh, Yogesh Kilam, Neelam, Benzy Mathews,

Title	Director	Cast
Aala		
Aalinganam		
Aalolam Kili		
Akhila		
Anuraagam		
Asurayugam		
Bheri	Kaviyoor Sivaprasad	K. P. A. C. Lalitha, Vani Viswanath, Ashokan, Madhupal
Diana		
Dr Prema		
Eden Thottam		
Ente Archana		
Horse Power		
Indraneelakkallu		
Kalachakram		
Kanavu		
Kuttappan Sakshi		
Level Cross		
Lovely		
Maanasa		
Madhuram		
Manivarnathooval		
Mayamohini		
Miss Suvarna		
Mohacheppu		
Mohaswapnam		
Moonnaam Yaamam		
Ms Sugandhavalli		
Namukkoru Koodaram		
Neelakaasham Niraye		Kalabhavan Navas, Rehana Navas
Nilaathooval		
Niramulla Swapnangal		
Njan Rajavu		
Pranaya Shalabhangal		
Prema Sallapam		
Pushpasharam		
Randu Penkuttikal		
Shambho Mahadeva		
Sisiram		
Sneha		
Soundarya Lahari		
Sthree Vesham		
Suvarna Mohangal		
Thamaasha Veeran		
Tharalam		
Vanibham		

== Dubbed films ==
Title	Director(s)	Original film		Cast	Ref.
Title	Director(s)	Film	Language	Cast	Ref.
Kaarmegham	SP Rajkumar	Karmegham	Tamil	Mammootty, Rajan P. Dev	
Hrudyaanjali	Raghurami Reddy	Hrudayanjali	Telugu		
