= Baburaj (actor) =

Indian actor, director, and screenwriter

- Born: Baburaj Jacob; Aluva, Kerala, India
- Education: Union Christian College, Aluva; Maharaja's College, Ernakulam; Government Law College, Ernakulam
- Occupations: Actor; director; producer
- Years active: 1994–present
- Spouse: Vani Viswanath (m. 2002)
- Children: 4

Baburaj Jacob, mononymously known as Baburaj, is an Indian actor, director, and screenwriter who works predominantly in Malayalam cinema and has also appeared in Tamil films. He began and established his career in cinema by playing antagonistic roles and graduated to comedic and character roles after the 2011 film Salt N' Pepper.

== Personal life ==
Baburaj married twice. He has two sons from his first marriage. His second marriage is to South Indian actress Vani Viswanath. The couple has four children. On 14 February 2017, Baburaj was stabbed by one of his neighbours in Idukki following an argument.

== Film career ==
Baburaj started his acting career as a junior artist. His debut in Malayalam was Bheesmacharya (1994), directed by Cochin Haneefa, where he played a notorious villain. He also acted as a villain in the Hindi movie, Hulchul (2004), which was a remake of the 1991 Malayalam blockbuster, Godfather. He produced four Malayalam movies and one Tamil movie.

In 2009, he debuted as a director in the Malayalam movie Black Dalia, starring Himself and Suresh Gopi in lead. He also directed the movie Manushyamrugam, starring Himself and Prithviraj Sukumaran in lead. His wife produced the movie.

In 2011, he did a comedy role in Salt N' Pepper, directed by Aashiq Abu. With this comedy role in Salt N' Pepper, he became one of the busiest actors in Malayalam cinema. He did one of the lead role in the crime thriller Manushyamrugam after the success of Salt N' Pepper. He did comedy roles in films such as Ordinary and Mayamohini. Apart from this, he was a lead actor in films such as Naughty Professor and DYSP Sankunni Uncle. Baburaj did a lead role in the 2017 comedy movie Honey Bee 2: Celebrations followed by Thrissivaperoor Kliptham, where he did the antagonist role. Baburaj's true potential to do the character roles was revealed with the film Koodasha. In this suspense revenge thriller film, he played the role of a father who seeks revenge against the persons killed his daughter. Baburaj's performance as Panakkal Jomon in the crime drama Joji (2021) was highly appreciated by the critics.

In 2021, he directed the comedy movie Black Coffee, which is a spin-off to Salt N' Pepper.

== Awards and nominations ==
Year	Award	Category	Film	Result	Ref.
2011	Kochi Times Film Awards	Best Actor in a Comic Role	Salt N' Pepper	Won	
2011	Asiavision Awards	Best Comedy Artist	Salt N' Pepper	Won	
2011	Vanitha Film Awards	Best Comedy Artist	Salt N' Pepper	Won	
2011	South Indian International Movie Awards	Best Comedy Artist	Salt N' Pepper	Won	
2011	Filmfare Awards South	Best Supporting Actor	Salt N' Pepper	Nominated	
2012	South Indian International Movie Awards	Best Comedian	Mayamohini	Nominated	
2012	Vanitha Film Awards	Best Comedy Artist	Mayamohini	Won	
2013	Asianet Film Awards	Best Comic Role	Mayamohini	Won	
2013	Amrita Film Awards	Best Comedian	Honey Bee	Won	
2014	South Indian International Movie Awards	Best Comedian	Honey Bee	Nominated	
2019	Kerala State Film Awards	Best Actor	Koodasha	Nominated	
2022	South Indian International Movie Awards	Best Actor in a Supporting Role	Joji	Won	

== Filmography ==
=== As actor ===
==== Malayalam films ====
Year	Title	Role	Notes
1994	Beeshmacharyara		
1994	The Porter	Karimpattakaran Kochekkan	
1994	Kambolam		
1994	Mimics Action 500	Ramesh Thamban	
1995	Street	Gunda	
1995	Arabikadaloram	Shaji	
1995	Kaattayile Thadi Thevarude Aana	John Danny	
1995	Thumboli Kadappuram		
1995	Peter Scott	Gunda	
1995	Special Squad	Chandrappan	
1995	Mazhavilkoodaram	College Gunda	
1995	Kalyanji Anandji	Kidnapper	
1995	Ezharakoottam		
1995	Three Men Army	Gunda	
1995	Thirumanassu	Albert Pereira	
1996	Ishtamanu nooruvattam		
1996	Manthrika Kuthira	Kondotty Jaffar	
1996	Naalaamkettile Nalla Thampimaar	Cleetus	
1996	Mimics Super 1000	Aniyan Kurup	
1996	KL 95 Ernakulam North	A.Z. Stanley	
1996	Kanjirapally Kariachan	Kalloorkaadan Stanley	
1996	Padanayakan		
1996	Swapna Lokathe Balabhaskaran		
1996	Dilliwala Rajakumaran		
1996	Kudamattam		
1996	Swarna Kireedam		
1997	Kottappurathe Koottukudumbam	Antony	
1997	Gajarajamanthram		
1997	Shibiram		
1997	Vamsham	SI Scaria	
1997	Ranger	Baburaj	
1997	Adukkala Rahasyam Angaadi Paattu	Adv. Babu Thomas	
1998	Ormacheppu	Police Officer	
1998	Oru Maravathoor Kanavu	Devassy	
1998	Harikrishnans	Prem Kumar	
1999	Chandamama		
1999	Red Indians	Jumbo Sankar	
2000	The Gang	Joe	
2000	Mera Naam Joker	Rajasekharan	
2000	Sathyameva Jayathe	Sivaratnam	
2000	Rapid Action Force	Alex Fernandez/Kargil Ghouse	
2000	Saivar Thirumeni	Ayyappan	
2001	Dhosth	Charlie Varkey	
2001	Randam Bhavam	Shetty	
2001	Naranathu Thampuran	Vikraman	
2001	Raavanaprabhu	Natesan	
2001	Nariman	Ajayan	
2001	Sraavu	Shivan	
2001	Praja	DIG Joseph Madacherry IPS	
2002	Stop Violence		
2002	Jagathy Jagadeesh in Town	Rajaji	
2002	Kuberan	Giri	
2002	Onnaman	Prathapan	
2002	Shivam	Ashokan	
2002	Chathurangam	SI Thankaraj	
2002	Valkannadi	Jayapalan	
2003	Kilichundan Mampazham	Hamsa	
2003	Chakram	Sudhakaran	
2003	Kaliyodam		
2004	Kusruthi	Ramabhadran	
2004	Sathyam	Mattancherry Martin	
2004	Amrutham		
2005	Athbhutha Dweepu	Captain Mohammad	
2005	Isra	Bhadran	
2005	Thaskaraveeran	Malayil Peter	
2005	Rappakal	Manikantan	
2005	Lokanathan IAS	CI Unnithan	
2005	Nerariyan CBI	Poopparathy Vasu	
2005	Rajamanikyam	CI Vikraman	
2006	Highway Police	Vikram	
2006	Bada Dosth	Bhaskaran	
2006	Prajapathi	CI Salim	
2006	Ravanan	Jamal	
2006	Mahasamudram	Mattakara Rajan	
2006	Kilukkam Kilukilukkam	Vishnu	
2006	Chacko Randaaman	Karibadam Kannan	
2006	Thuruppugulan	Mahi	
2006	Pachakuthira	Himself	
2006	Chinthamani Kolacase	Isra Qureshi	
2006	Chess	CI Sarath	
2006	The Don	Abdu	
2006	Pothan Vava	Michael	
2007	Black Cat	Philipose	
2007	Ali Bhai	Koya	
2007	Abraham & Lincoln	Ameen	
2007	Avan Chandiyude Makan	Sonychan	
2007	Pranayakalam	Gunda	
2007	Chotta Mumbai	Satheeshan's henchman	
2007	Time	Damodharan Kartha	
2007	Athisayan	Parunthu Johnny	
2007	Mission 90 Days	Major Deepak	
2007	Sooryan	Kattiparaban	
2007	Nadiya Kollappetta Rathri	Lakkidi Manikantan	
2007	Nagaram	Lawrence	
2007	Indrajith	Hamid	
2007	Nasrani	Sayed	
2008	Aayudham	C. I. Rappayi	
2008	Twenty:20	Nazar	
2009	My Big Father	Chacko	
2009	Black Dalia	CI Anwar Ali	
2009	Daddy Cool	CI Soman	
2010	Pramani	Sibichan	
2010	Thanthonni	Ummachan	
2010	Pokkiri Raja	Unnithan	
2011	Salt N' Pepper	Babu Raj	
2011	Manushyamrugam	Tipper Johnny	
2012	Asuravithu	Fr. Ambarra Shaji	
2012	Second Show	Chaver Anthony & Chaver Vavachan	
2012	Vaidooryam		
2012	Thalsamayam Oru Penkutty	Thomas	
2012	Ordinary	Vakkachan	
2012	Mayamohini	Adv. Laksmi Narayanan	
2012	Naughty Professor	Professor Viswambaran	
2012	Cinema Company	Sabu, a movie-loving thug	
2012	Jawan of Vellimala	Chacko	
2012	Mr. Marumakan	Adv. K.V. Panikkar	
2012	Idiots	Freddy	
2013	Entry	ACP Rishikesh	
2013	Kammath & Kammath	Driver Gopi	
2013	Honey Bee	Fernando d'Silva	
2013	Policemamman	Sankaranunni	
2013	Ithu Manthramo Thanthramo Kuthanthramo	S. S. Nair	
2013	Pigman	GM Veera Swamy	
2013	Blackberry		
2013	Sringaravelan	Mahalingam	
2014	Ulsaha Committee	Chopra	
2014	Peruchazhi	Pottakkuzhy Jabbar	
2014	Tamaar Padaar	Jumper Thambi and Khalid Qureshi	
2014	Mylanchi Monchulla Veedu	Dr. Shajahan	
2015	8th March	Abdul Khader	
2016	Poyi Maranju Parayathe	Ananthan	
2016	Wonderful Journey		
2017	Honey Bee 2: Celebrations	Fernandez d'Silva aka Ferno	
2017	Honey Bee 2.5	Himself	Cameo
2017	Thrissivaperoor Kliptham	Joy Chembadan	
2018	Kaly	Thangal	
2018	Sketch	"Royapuram" Kumar	
2018	Neeli	Prabhakaran	
2018	Koodasha		
2019	My Great Grandfather	Shivadas	
2019	Vikruthi	CI Siju Varkey	
2021	Black Coffee	Cook Babu	
2021	Joji	Panachel Jomon	
2021	Power Star		
2021	Marakkar: Arabikadalinte Simham	Puthumana Panicker	
2022	Kooman	CI Harilal Dev	
2022	Gold	CPO Rakesh Manjappra	
2023	Nalla Nilavulla Rathri	Kurien	
2023	Kunjamminis Hospital	Maala Varkey	
2024	Anweshippin Kandethum	P. V. Pailo	
2024	Little Hearts	Pushpakandam "Baby"	
2025	Lovely	Simon	
2025	Hridayapoorvam	Captain Manoj	
2025	Karam	Rosario	
2025	Pongala		
2026	Varavu		
2026	Udumbanchola Vision		

==== Tamil films ====
Year	Title	Role	Notes
1998	Thayin Manikodi		
2002	Jaya		
2003	Parasuram		
2004	Jana	Chinnapandi	
2008	Ellam Avan Seyal	Ravi Kishore	
2018	Sketch	"Royapuram" Kumar	
2022	Veeramae Vaagai Soodum	Nedunchezhiyan	
2025	Thug Life	Inspector Samuel Royapan	
2025	Coolie	Simon's Enemy	

==== Other language films ====
Year	Title	Role	Language	Notes
2004	Hulchul	Rowdy	Hindi	
2025	Kingdom	Odiyappan	Telugu	

=== As director, producer and writer ===
Year	Film	Director	Producer	Story	Screenplay	Dialogue	Notes
1997	Gajarajamathram	No	Yes	No	No	No	
1997	Adukkala Rahasyam Angadipattu	No	No	Yes	No	No	
1998	Kulirkaattu	No	Yes	No	No	No	
2000	The Gang	No	Yes	Yes	Yes	Yes	
2006	Thantra	No	Yes	No	No	No	
2009	Black Dalia	Yes	No	Yes	Yes	Yes	
2011	Manushyamrugam	Yes	No	Yes	Yes	Yes	
2012	Naughty Professor	No	No	Yes	Yes	Yes	Also lyricist for "Jig Jinga" and "Thalam Thiruthalam"
2021	Black Coffee	Yes	No	Yes	Yes	Yes	

=== Playback singing ===
- Maamaa Maamaa as Police Maman (2013)

== Television ==
- Comedy stars season 2 (Asianet) as Judge
- Lunars Comedy Express (Asianet Plus) as Judge
- Kadamattathu Kathanar (Asianet)
- kudipaka-(Asianet)
