= Madhupal =

Indian actor and director

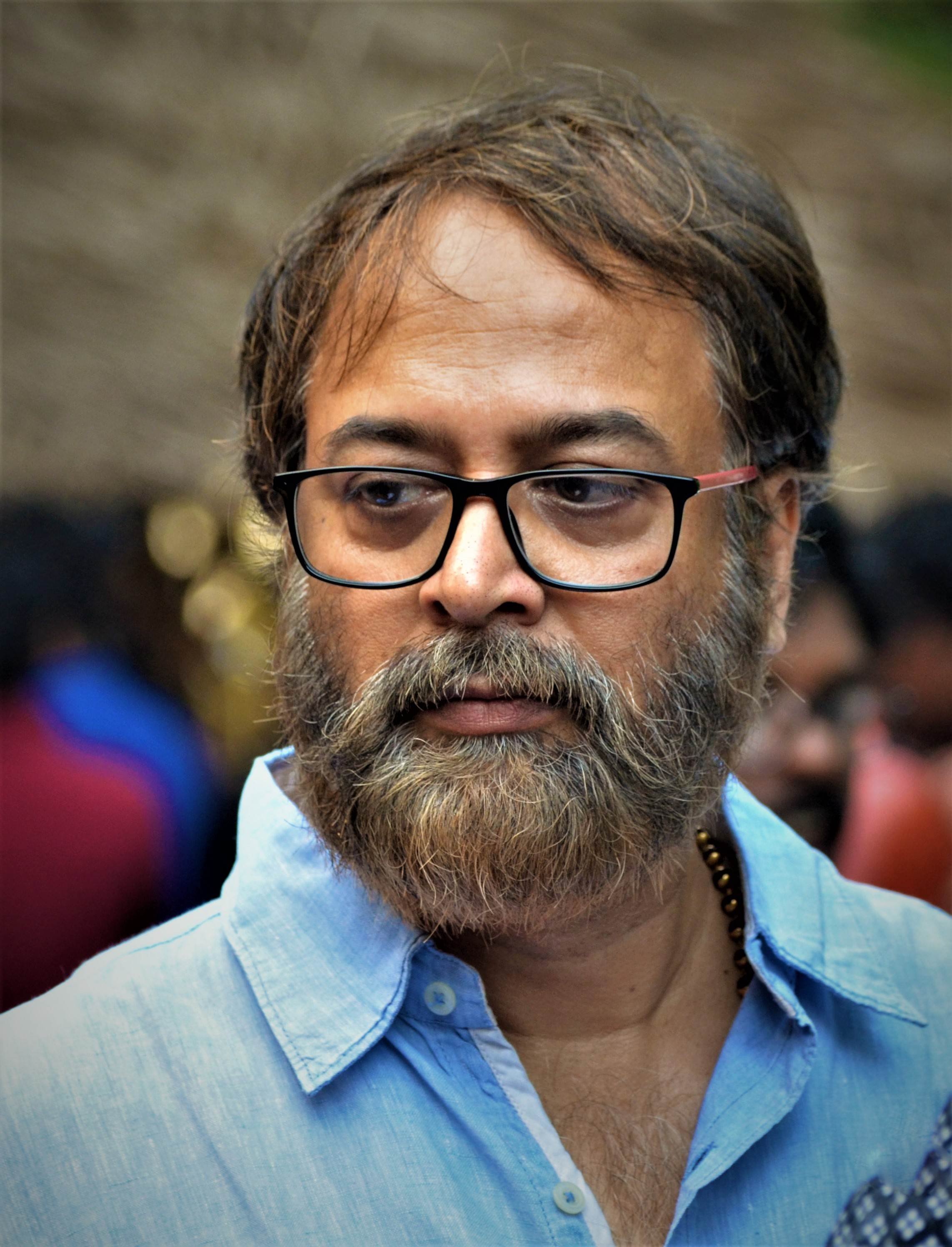
- Madhupal at the International Film Festival of Kerala (IFFK), 2017
- Born: 1963 (age 62–63); Kozhikode, Kerala, India
- Occupations: Actor, film director, producer, screenwriter

Madhupal Kannambathu (born 1963), known mononymously as Madhupal, is an Indian actor, film director, and screenwriter who works in Malayalam cinema. He made his acting debut with Kashmeeram (1994) and his directorial debut with Thalappavu (2008), a film based on the life of Arikkad Varghese, which received several awards.

== Biography ==
Madhupal was born to C. Madhava Menon from the Chengalath family, a native of Kannur, and K. Rugmani Amma from the Kannambathu family, who is from Kozhikode. He is the eldest of five children, with three younger brothers and a sister. Madhupal got his family name, Kannambathu, through matrilineal succession.

A native of Kozhikode, Madhupal completed a postgraduate degree in Commerce. His association with cinema began during his childhood in Palakkad, where his father operated a cinema theatre. He began his film career as an assistant director under filmmakers Bharat Gopy and Rajiv Anchal. As an assistant director, he worked on films including Butterflies, Kashmeeram, Guru (India's official submission to the 70th Academy Awards), Nothing but Life, and Yamanam, the latter of which received the National Film Award.

Madhupal made his acting debut in 1994 with Kashmeeram, portraying a negative role that led to similar character roles in subsequent films. He received the Critics' Award for Best Debut Actor for his performance in Kashmeeram and later won the Second Best Actor award for portraying Hari in Kazhcha, a television adaptation from the Manorathangal series broadcast on Amrita TV.

He also worked as an assistant director on the television serial Shararandal, written by National Film Award-winning writer P. F. Mathews and directed by Jude Attipetty. In addition, he wrote the screenplay and dialogues for the Malayalam film Bharatheeyam (1997).

Madhupal made his directorial debut in television with Akashathile Paravakal, which aired on Kairali TV. His feature film directorial debut in 2008 with Thalappavu, received the Kerala State Film Award for Best Debut Director, along with several other honours. His second feature film, Ozhimuri, was selected for the Indian Panorama section and screened at the International Film Festival of Kerala. The film won the Kerala State Film Award for Second Best Film.

In addition to his work in cinema, Madhupal is a Malayalam short story writer. He has published seven short story collections, and his works have been translated into English, Hindi, and Tamil. His writings have appeared in Malayalam periodicals including Mathrubhumi, Madhyamam, and Bhashaposhini.

Following the 2004 Indian Ocean earthquake, Madhupal participated in relief and rehabilitation initiatives. He has been associated with Santhigiri Ashram, Thiruvananthapuram, serving as Assistant General Convener of its Advisory Committee.

Madhupal has served as a member of Kerala State Chalachithra Academy, Kerala Folklore Academy, and Kerala Children's Film Society. He has also served on the board of directors of the Kerala State Film Development Corporation (KSFDC). He was subsequently appointed Chairman of the Kerala State Cultural Activists Welfare Fund Board.

== Awards and recognitions ==
- Kerala State Television Awards 2018 for Best Director (Kaligandaki)
- Kerala State Government Film Award for Second Best Film of the Year 2012 (Ozhimuri)
- Best Film 2012 Pearl Award Qatar Kerala Film Producers (Ozhimuri)
- Best Director Award Jaihind Television 2012 (Ozhimuri)
- Best Director Award Doordharsan Nirav (Ozhimuri)
- Second Best Film Kerala Film Critics Award 2012 (Ozhimuri)
- Best Actor Special Jury National Award Government of India to Lal (Ozhimuri)
- Director of Excellence Award from Indonesia Film Festival 2013 film (Ozhimuri)
- Kerala State Government Television Awards for Best Director 2012 (Daivaththinu Swantham Devootty)
- Kerala State Film Award for Best Debut Director Kerala State Government (Thalappavu)
- Best Director 2008 Kerala Film Critics Award 2008 (Thalappavu)
- Best Director 2008 Sohan Antony Memorial Award 2008 (Thalappavu)
- Best Debut Director 2008 Jesy Foundation Award (Thalappavu)
- Best Debut Director 2008 ALA Award (Thalappavu)
- Best Director 2001 TV Serial Aakaasaththile Paravakal Kerala Film Critics Award
- Best Director 2001 TV Serial Malayalam Television Viewers Association Award

Awards for published books

- Kairaly Atlas Saahithya Award 2006 for the story "Velicham Nizhanlinu Velippedum" (published in Bhaashaaposhini)
- Vaikom Muhamed Basheer Puraskaram 2019 to the book Katha 2019 published by Sahithya Pravarthaka Sahakaranasamgham NBS Kottayam
- Indian Truth Sahithya Puraskaram 2019 to the book Katha Published by NBS Kottayam

== Filmography ==
=== As an actor ===
==== 1990s ====
Year	Title	Role	Notes
1994	Kashmeeram	Aashiq Quais	
1994	Vardhakya Puranam	Vysaakhan	
1995	Ezharakoottam	Balu	First lead role
1995	Maanthrikam	Willy	
1995	Thacholi Varghese Chekavar	Venu	
1995	Sreeragam	Gopu	
1995	Saadaram	Nazar	
1995	Arabia	Salim	
1995	Oru Abhibhashakante Case Diary	Reji	
1996	Mr. Clean	Harikrishnan	
1996	Ishtamanu Nooruvattom	Manu	
1996	Kanchanam	Siddhu	
1996	Azhakiya Ravanan	Himself	Cameo
1996	Mayooranritham	Jayadevan	
1996	Kaathil Oru Kinnaram	Ajith	
1996	Sathyabhamakkoru Premalekhanam	Indrajith	
1996	Pallivathuckal Thommichan	Sunny	
1996	Ammuvinte Aangalamar		
1996	Swapna Lokathe Balabhaskaran	Johnnie	
1996	Excuse Me Ethu Collegila		
1997	Snehadoothu	Mahendran	
1997	Kilukil Pambaram	Chithrapuram Mohana Varma	
1997	Asuravamsam	Moosa Settu's son	
1997	Guru	Ramanagan	
1998	Bharatheeyam	Jose the father of Sheenaz	
1998	Aaghosham	Titto	
1998	Mayilpeelikkavu	Sreeharan	
1998	Sooryavanam	Syam	
1998	Samaantharangal	Jamal	
1999	Pallavur Devanarayanan	Poojari	
1999	Stalin Sivadas	Sukumaran	
1999	Rishivamsham		
1999	Captain	David	
1999	Deepasthambham Mahascharyam	Dinesh	
1999	Agni Sakshi		
1999	Aakasha Ganga	Devan Thampuran	

==== 2000s ====
Year	Title	Role	Notes
2000	Mister Butler	Madhu	
2000	Ival Draupadi	Ameer Khan	
2000	Vinayapoorvam Vidhyaadharan	Ashique	
2000	Pilots		
2000	Susanna	Rameshan	
2000	Mark Antony	Parel Pappachan	
2000	Dada Sahib	Ravi	
2001	Goa	Simon	
2001	Chandanamarangal		
2001	Nalacharitham Nalam Divasam		
2001	Raavanaprabhu	Hari Narayanan	Cameo
2001	Ee Naadu Inale Vare	T. K. Vijayan	
2002	Kayamkulam Kanaran		
2002	Kanal Kireedam		
2002	Desam	Vijayakrishnan	
2002	Kanmashi		
2002	Chirikkudukka	Nandakumar	
2002	Stop Violence	Antony	
2003	Achante Kochumolu	Chandu	
2003	Saphalam	Antony	
2003	Ammakilikkoodu	Company Manager	
2003	Valathottu Thirinjal Nalamathe Veedu	Suresh	
2003	Margam		
2003	Manassinakkare	Benny Kompanakkaattil	
2004	Maratha Naadu	Majeed	
2004	Thalamelam		
2004	Wanted		
2004	Nothing but Life	Johnny	
2005	Isra	Balu	
2005	Deepangal Sakshi		
2005	Made in USA	Johny	
2005	Oru Naal Oru Kanavu	Sekhar	Tamil film
2005	Five Fingers	Sunnychan	
2005	Lessons	Father	
2006	Eakantham	Vishwanathan	
2006	Pathaaka	Pratheesh Nambiar	
2006	Prajapathi	Vijayan - Film Director	
2006	Lion	Mathew Kurien	
2006	Chess	Adv. Mathews	
2006	Vaasthavam	Joseph	
2007	Valmeekam		
2007	Detective	Jose	
2007	Paradesi	Adv. Pradeep	
2007	Sooryan	Divakaran	
2007	Nadiya Kollappetta Rathri	Dr. Ajayaghosh	
2008	Kovalam	Ali Khan	
2008	Twenty:20	Shekharan Kutty	
2009	Parayan Marannathu		
2009	Aayirathil Oruvan	Dineshan	

==== 2010s ====
Year	Title	Role	Notes
2010	Kadaksham	Padmanabhan Thampi	
2010	Nakharam		
2011	Athe Mazha Athe Veyil		
2012	Red Alert		
2012	Little Master		
2012	Aakasmikam		
2013	Tourist Home	Mammotty	
2013	Teens		
2013	Radio Jockey		
2013	Memories	Dr. Sukumaran Nair	
2014	To Noora with Love		
2015	Saradhi	JP	
2015	Haram	Dr. John	
2015	Perithondhan		
2015	Saigal Padukayanu		
2015	Anarkali	Madhu	
2016	White Paper		
2016	Inspector Dawood Ibrahim	Ambanattil Rahim Haji	
2018	Oru Kuprasidha Payyan		Cameo
2018	Pretham 2	Mathew Emmanuel	

==== 2020s ====
Year	Title	Role	Notes
2020	Paapam Cheyyathavar Kalleriyatte	George	
2021	Kaalchilambu		
2021	The Priest	Dr. Muralidharan	
2022	In	D.Y.S.P. Ayyappan K	
2023	Nila		
2024	Anweshippin Kandethum	Fr. Thomas	
2024	Nadikar	Director S. Sasi	
2024	Sree Muthappan		
2024	Ajayante Randam Moshanam	Edakkal Rajavu	
2025	Haal		
2026	I, Nobody	CI Jomon	
2026	Bouma		
2027	Harivarasanam †	TBA	

=== As a dubbing artist ===
1. Aakasha Ganga (1999) for Riyaz as Unnikrishna Varma Thampuran

=== As a director ===
Year	Film	Notes
2008	Thalappavu	Kerala State Film Award for Best Debutant Director; Kerala Film Critics Award for Best Film; Kerala Film Critics Award for Best Director; Kerala Film Critics Award for Best Scriptwriter; Amateur Little Theatre Award for Best Debutant Director; Sohan Antony Memorial Film Award for Best Director
2012	Ozhimuri	Selected for Indian Panorama - 43rd IFFI 2012; Selected for Indian Panorama - 17th IFFK 2012; Kerala State Government Film Award Second Best Film Award 2012; Kerala Film Producers Association - Pearl Award 2013 Best Film and Best Actor; Director of Excellence from Indonesia Film Festival 2013; Jaihind Television Film Award 2013 Best Director; DadaSahab Phalke Janambhumi Purasakar Noteworthy Film 6th Nashik International Film Festival 2014
2017	Crossroad	Segment: Oru Rathriyude Kooli
2018	Oru Kuprasidha Payyan	Best Actress Award Nimisha Sajayan Kerala State Film Award

== Published works ==
- Ee Jeevitham Jeevichu Theerkkunnathu
- Hebrewil Oru Premalekhanam
- Jainimettile Pashukkal (co-authored with Joseph Marien)
- Pranayinikalude Uthyaanavum Kumbasaarakoodum
- Kadal Oru Nathiyude Kathhayaanu
- Madhupaalinte Kathhakal (2010, published by Mathrubhumi Books)
- Facebook (novel) (2012, published by Mathrubhumi Books)
- Vaakkukal Kelkkaan Oru Kaalam Varum - Memories (2015, published by Green Pepper Books)
- Avan (Maar) Jaaraputhran (short story collection, 2016, published by DC Books Kottayam, Second edition published by Mathrubhumi books 2020)
- "Katha" 2019 published by - Sahithya Pravarthaka Sahakaranasamgham NBS Kottayam
- "Pallaand Vaazhka My Micro Kathakal" 2021 (published by Paper Publica Thiruvananthapuram)
- "Athbuthangal kaanum jeevithaththil" short stories 2022 (published by Macbeth publication, Calicut)
- "Irukarakalkkidayil oru Buddhan" short stories 2023 (published by Mathrubhumi books)

== Television serials ==
As actor

- Pavitra Jaililanu (Asianet)
- Dream City (Surya TV)
- Sree Mahabhagavatham (Asianet)
- Rachiyamma (Dooradarshan)
- Niramala (Dooradarshan)
- Deivathinte Swantham Devootty (Mazhavil Manorama)
- Kali Gandaki (Amrita TV)
- CBI Diary (Mazhavil Manorama)

As director

- Aakasaththile Paravakal (Kairali)
- Deivathinte Swantham Devootty (Mazhavil Manorama)
- Kali Gandaki (Amrita TV)
- Jeevithanizhalpaadukal Vaikomk Muhammed Basheer's novel for PRD Kerala State
- M K Sanoo A documentary for PRD Kerala State

== Other works ==
He acts as a judge on the popular reality show Yuvatharam, telecast on Jaihind TV.
