= Swami Gururethnam =

Indian spiritual leader

Swami Gururetnam
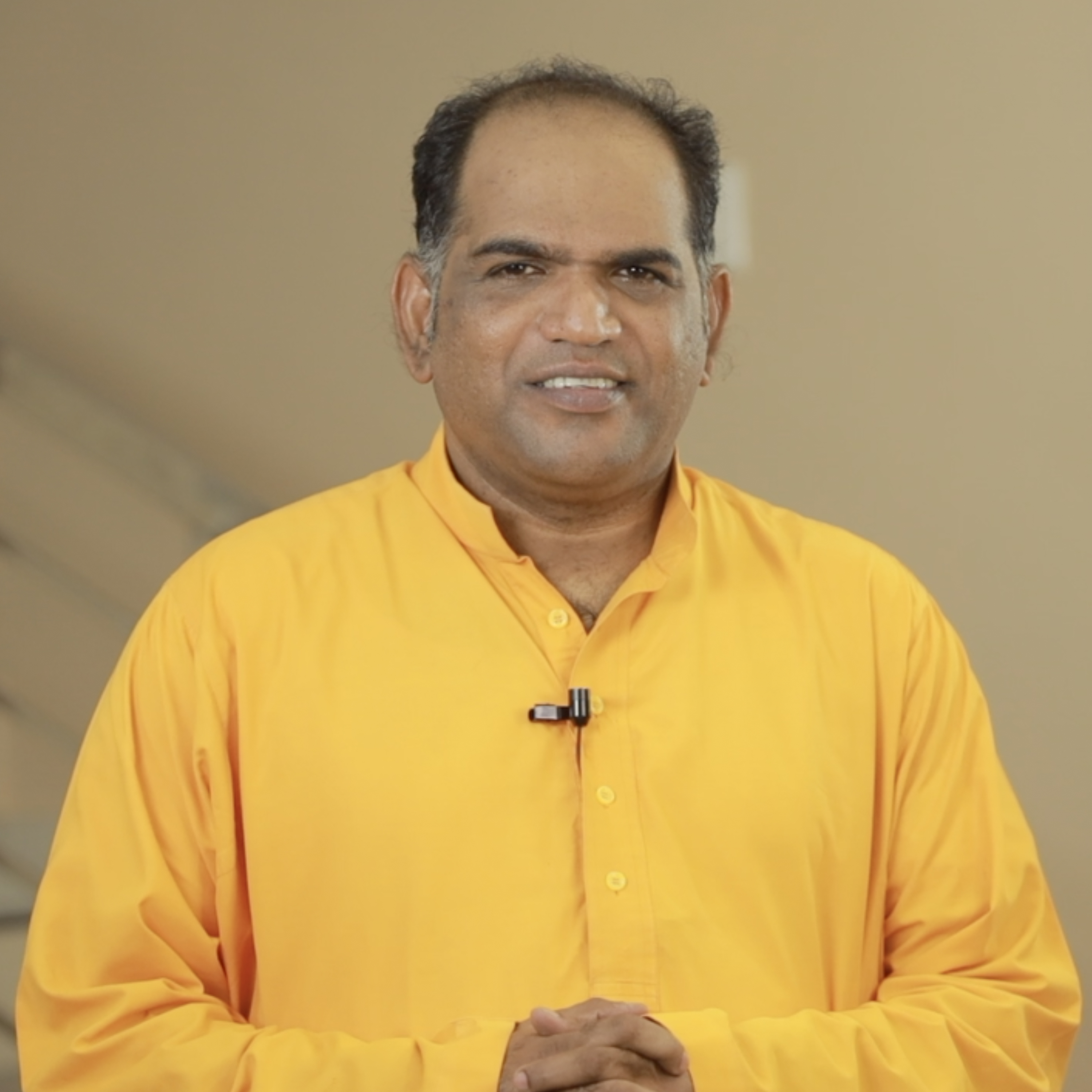

Personal life
- Born: May 1974 Cherthala, Alapuzha, Kerala, India

Religious life
- Religion: Guru Parampara

Senior posting
- Teacher: Karunakara Guru

Swami Gururethnam (born 30 May 1974 ) also known as Swami Gururethnam Jnana Thapaswi is an Indian spiritual leader and General Secretary of Thiruvananthapuram Shantigiri Ashram founded by Karunakara Guru.

== Biography ==
Swami Gururethnam was born on 30 May 1974 in Cherthala. He completed his education at SB College Cherthala . In 1995, he worked as the Ernakulam District Head of Trio Pharma in Ahmedabad.During this time that he met Navjyotishri Karunakara Guru, which was a major turning point in his life In 1999, he chose the celibate life before the ascetic life.

== Ashram Activities ==
In 1997, Swami Gururethnam started his ashram life as a partner in the medicine supply chain of Shantigiri Ashram. Involved in youth welfare activities of the Shantigiri Ashram. After his ordination, Swami made the health sector of Shantigiri more active by prioritizing the field of emergency services and philanthropy. It was during this period that Shantigiri's Siddha Medical College in Thiruvananthapuram and Ayurveda Medical College in Palakkad were established. Swami Gururetnam has been a member of the Ashram Board of Directors since 13 September 2003. From May 2009, he was the organizing secretary of the ashram. Since September 6, 2019, he has been managing the Ashram activities as the General Secretary.
