= Guru (1997 film) =

1997 film directed by Rajiv Anchal

- Poster
- Directed by: Rajiv Anchal
- Written by: C. G. Rajendra Babu
- Story by: Rajiv Anchal
- Produced by: Janasammathi Creations
- Starring: Mohanlal; Suresh Gopi; Madhupal; Kaveri; Sithara; Sreenivasan; Nedumudi Venu
- Cinematography: S. Kumar
- Edited by: B. Lenin; V. T. Vijayan
- Music by: Ilaiyaraaja
- Production company: Janasammathi Creations
- Distributed by: Janasammathi Release
- Release date: 12 September 1997
- Running time: 160 minutes
- Country: India
- Language: Malayalam
- Budget: ₹3 crore

Guru (transl. Teacher / master) is a 1997 Indian Malayalam-language fantasy drama film directed by Rajiv Anchal and written by C. G. Rajendra Babu from a story by Rajeev. Mohanlal plays the lead role, while Suresh Gopi, Madhupal, Sithara, Kaveri, Sreelakshmi, Nedumudi Venu and Sreenivasan appears in supporting roles, and Nassar in a cameo appearance.

The original musical score and songs were composed by Ilaiyaraaja. The score was conducted and performed by the Budapest Symphony Orchestra, Hungary. This was the first time in Indian cinema, the background score of a film was recorded completely outside the country. Guru was selected as India's official entry to the Oscars for the Best Foreign Language Film category, but was not nominated. Guru is the first Malayalam film submitted by India for the Oscars.

== Plot ==
Raghuraman is the son of a local Hindu temple priest in an idyllic village where Hindus and Muslims live harmoniously. When ambitious politicians’ goons, disguised as Muslims, cause trouble at the local temple, tensions between the communities escalate into widespread religious riots. After his family is killed, Raghuraman joins a Hindu extremist gang to seek revenge by attacking Muslims sheltering in a Guru’s ashram. After infiltrating the ashram, he meets Vaidehi, who suggests that he meditate. During meditation, he enters an altered state of consciousness and finds himself transported to another world.

In this world, everyone is blind and believes sight to be a lie; even speaking about it is considered blasphemy. Children are taught from an early age that sight does not exist. Raghuraman befriends Ramanagan, whom he saves from death, and insists that a world of sight exists and that he can see. The people refuse to believe him and warn that such claims could lead to his execution by the king and elders.

As he lives among them, Raghuraman learns their culture and observes how their society has adapted to life without sight. He discovers that newborn babies are immediately given the juice of a special fruit. Ramanagan explains that the fruit comes from a sacred tree given to the valley by a goddess after newborns began dying. Curious, Raghuraman climbs the tree and eats its highly addictive fruit, known as Ilama pazham (Ilama fruit), whose poisonous seeds are commonly eaten as a delicacy. He becomes blind and is captured by the king’s soldiers, who sentence him to death by forcing him to eat the seeds, a rare and cruel punishment.

After consuming the seeds, Raghuraman is left to die but awakens hours later with his sight restored. Realising that the seeds cure blindness, he convinces Ramanagan and his family to eat them, restoring their sight. The knowledge spreads rapidly, and more people begin following Raghuraman.

The king and his advisers arrest him, prompting a rebellion. The people storm the palace armed with weapons, but Raghuraman urges them not to use violence. At the same moment, in the real world, he drops his weapon and awakens. As the extremist group begins attacking the refugees in the ashram, Raghuraman rushes to protect them, regardless of their religion.

== Cast ==
- Mohanlal as Raghuraman
- Suresh Gopi as King Vijayanta
- Madhupal as Ramanagan
- Kaveri as Princes Syamantaga
- Sithara as Vaidehi
- Sreelakshmi as Sitalakshmi
- Sonia as Queen, King Vijayanta's Wife
- Charuhasan as Raghuraman's father
- N. F. Varghese as MLA John Kuruvila
- Murali as Sahib Abdullah
- Sreenivasan as Sravanan
- Nedumudi Venu as Teacher
- Captain Raju as Old King (King Vijayanta's father)
- Reena as Old Queen (King Vijayanta's mother)
- Mohan Raj as Senadhipan
- Kochu Preman
- Chandni Shaju as Princes Syamantaga's Thozhi
- K. B. Ganesh Kumar
- Shankar as Singer (cameo appearance)
- Nassar as The culprit (cameo appearance)

== Production ==
Rajiv Anchal cites his influence for the film to H. G. Wells's short story The Country of the Blind, which tells the story of a man who finds himself in a valley of blind men. Anchal first read the book during his college education. He was awestruck by its story and the description of the valley of the blind. He used the Wellsian theme in the film to picturise the human condition, that of "darkness overpowering the soul". Anchal is a disciple of the spiritual leader Karunakara Guru, founder of Santhigiri Ashram in Pothencode, Thiruvananthapuram. The idea for the film came when he met Guru seven years ago (before the release). The film is based on the Guru and tells the message Guru strives to convey to the materialistic world. The fund for the film was raised by 60 of the disciples in the Santhigiri Ashram, including Anchal. The film was made on a production cost of ₹3 crore. The dream land was shot completely in and around an abandoned magnesite mine located near Yercaud in Tamil Nadu. According to the film's art director Muthuraj, "The total expenses were just Rs.24 lakh and for a scene involving a miniature of a hill the expenditure was just Rs.350".

== Soundtrack ==
The film's soundtrack contains six songs, all composed by Ilaiyaraaja and lyrics by S. Ramesan Nair. The orchestration for the film's original songs and background score were composed and conducted by Ilaiyaraaja and performed by the Budapest Symphony Orchestra, Hungary. The audio cassette of the soundtrack was presented by Mammootty.

Guru (Original Motion Picture Soundtrack)
No.	Title	Singer(s)	Length
1.	"Arunakirana Deepam"	K. J. Yesudas, Radhika Thilak	6:09
2.	"Devasangeetham Neeyalle"	K. J. Yesudas, Radhika Thilak	6:33
3.	"Gurucharanam Saranam"	Lali Anilkumar, G. Venugopal & Chorus	5:18
4.	"Minnaram Maanathu"	Sujatha Mohan	5:09
5.	"Thatharam"	M. G. Sreekumar	5:34

== Accolades ==
Guru was selected as India's official entry to the Oscars for the Best Foreign Language Film category for the 70th Academy Awards. Guru was the first Malayalam film submitted by India for the Oscars.

Kerala State Film Awards

- Best Production Designer – T. Muthuraj
- Best Makeup Artist – Pattanam Rasheed
- Best Costume Designer – S. B. Satheeshan

Kerala Film Critics Association Awards

- Best Feature Film Promoting National, Social and Environmental Values
- Best Cinematographer - S. Kumar
- Best Art Director - Muthuraj
- Best Lyricist - S. Ramesan Nair

Screen Awards

- Best Actor (Malayalam) – Mohanlal
- Best Cinematography (South) – S. Kumar
- Best Director (Malayalam) – Rajiv Anchal

== See also ==
- List of submissions to the 70th Academy Awards for Best Foreign Language Film
- List of Indian submissions for the Academy Award for Best Foreign Language Film
