= Chinthamani Kolacase =

- Directed by: Shaji Kailas
- Screenplay by: A. K. Sajan
- Story by: A. K. Sajan
- Produced by: M. Renjith
- Starring: Suresh Gopi
- Cinematography: Raja Rathinam
- Edited by: Don Max
- Music by: Music; Ishaan Dev; Score; C.Rajamni
- Production company: Rejaputhra Visual Media
- Release date: 31 March 2006
- Country: India
- Language: Malayalam

Chinthamani Kolacase (transl. Chinthamani Murder Case) is a 2006 Indian Malayalam-language vigilante legal thriller film directed by Shaji Kailas. This film was later remade in tamil as Ellam Avan Seyal. The film stars Suresh Gopi in the lead role alongside Thilakan, Biju Menon, Kalabhavan Mani, Sai Kumar, Prem Prakash and Vani Viswanath in supporting roles while Bhavana appears in cameo as the title character. This film narrates the story of Lal Krishna Viradiyar / L.K, an infamous criminal lawyer and a murderous vigilante, who provides verdict in his style of law enforcement for the criminals after the court sessions.

The style of the movie is non-linearity that is maintained throughout the entire film. The basic story-telling style of Shaji Kailas is spun on and off by the writer A. K. Sajan. It was remade in Telugu as Sri Mahalakshmi and in Tamil as Ellam Avan Seyal. The core storyline was also used in the Kannada movie Aptha.

== Plot ==
Lal Krishna Viradiyar alias L.K. is a psychotic and ruthless criminal lawyer with an even more enigmatic mission. Lal Krishna assists hardened criminals to escape from the courts by efficiently managing the case, and highlighting lack of evidence. Post-acquittal, he pursues and takes them out in a bizarre show of vigilante justice. Isra Khureshi, an LLB graduate, who is accused of killing his teacher Rasiya, invites Lal Krishna as his lawyer, asking him to join for a party at his farmhouse for celebrating the success. Lal Krishna arrives at the spot and kills Khureshi, claiming that it is his duty to wipe out evil forces to maintain law and order. Later, Lal Krishna kills David Rajarathnam, a Pondicherry-based gangster, who was accused of assaulting his daughter.

ASP Jagannivasan, is suspicious of Lal Krishna's moves, and has been closely observing him for a long time. Lal Krishna takes up the case of the Mirchi girls, a band of spoilt, 9 rich NRIs, who are accused in the ragging and murder of Chinthamani, their college mate and an innocent girl from a conservative background. Chinthamani's father Veeramani Warrier is fighting hard for justice and is represented by a public prosecutor Kannayi Parameshwaran, who is famous for his unique style of argument. After a long court battle, Lal Krishna succeeds in bringing the judgement in favor of Mirchi Girls. Lal Krishna finds out that Kannayi Parameshwaran and college principal Dr. Kim Sudarshan are actually Chinthamani's killers. Kannayi is a silent partner in the private medical college, who killed Chinthamani.

Chinthamani was sent to Sudarshan's house by her conniving hostel warden Volga and was asked to withdraw her admission from the medical college, where she resists to comply, but Kannayi kills her by assaulting her, and place charges on the Mirchi Girls for the inhumane act. Kannayi had other major business interests, through selling the medical seats of Mirchi Girls, presumed to be vacated by them during the course of the investigation and trial of the case - to a potential buyer charging an exorbitant sum of ₹50 lakh (US$52,000) per seat. In his self-styled violent methods, Lal Krishna kills Volga,Kannayi and Sudarshan to deliver justice to Chinthamani and Veeramani Warrier. Though aware of the entire scenario, Jagannivasan is unable to arrest Lal Krishna, due to lack of evidence and leaves him with a small admiration for the latter.

== Cast ==
- Suresh Gopi as Adv. Lal Krishna Viradiyar (L.K)
- Thilakan as Veeramani Warrier
- Biju Menon as ASP Jagannivasan IPS
- Kalabhavan Mani as CI Ayyappadas
- Sai Kumar as Adv. Kannayi Parameswaran
- Prem Prakash as Dr. Kim Sudarshan
- Vani Viswanath as Adv. Devi Pattammal
- Maniyanpilla Raju as CI Bava
- Vijayakumar as Soolapani Warrier
- Anil Murali as Satheeshan
- Balachandran Chullikkadu as Sathyan Master
- Vinayakan as Uchandi
- T. P. Madhavan as Adv. Manishankar Iyer
- Jibin Thomas (achayan)
- Rekha as Gajalakshmi
- Poornima Anand as Volga Madasheri
- Aishwarya Ajit as Natasha
- Deepika Mohan as Shreya
- Jisna Ali as Thara Shanmughan
- Biju Pappan as Shanmughan
- Baburaj as Isra Khureshi
- Bheeman Raghu as David Rajarathnam
- Bhavana as C. V. Chinthamani Warrier (cameo appearance)
- Srividya as Balamani Warrier (in portrait)
- Murali as LK's father (in portrait)

== Reception ==
Chinthamani Kolacase was released a few months after the success of Shaji Kailas - Suresh Gopi's film The Tiger. It went on become one of the biggest money grosser of the year 2006. This film also reaffirmed the chair of Shaji Kailas and Suresh Gopi in Malayalam cinema. The script of this film was done by A. K. Sajan, who had earlier done films like Butterflies, Janathipathyam, Crime File and Stop Violence.

=== Box office ===
The film was a commercial success. The film ran for 100 days in major centres of its release.

== Remakes ==
It was remade in Telugu as Sri Mahalakshmi starring Srihari and remade in Tamil as Ellam Avan Seyal with same director. Newcomer RK plays Lal Krishna and actress Bhama plays Chinthamani in the Tamil version and Srihari plays L.K. and Poorna plays Sri Mahalakshmi in the Telugu version, while Thilakan plays the latter's father in the Telugu version, reprised his role as Chinthamani's father from the original Malayalam film. The core storyline was also used in the Kannada movie Aptha.
