= Chandiroor =

- village
- Location in Kerala, India Chandiroor (India)
- Coordinates: 9°50′53″N 76°18′27″E
- Country: India
- State: Kerala
- District: Alappuzha

Languages
  - Official: Malayalam, English
- Time zone: UTC+5:30 (IST)
- PIN: 688547
- Telephone code: 0478
- Vehicle registration: KL-04 and KL-32
- Nearest city: Kochi
- Lok Sabha constituency: Alappuzha
- Vidhan Sabha constituency: Aroor

Chandiroor is a village in Alappuzha district, Kerala, India. It is situated on National Highway 66 (India) between Eramalloor and Aroor. It is part of the Aroor Assembly constituency and the Alappuzha Parliamentary constituency. Historically, it was located in the Travancore kingdom. Chandiroor is the birthplace of Navajyothy Sree Karaunakara Guru founder of Santhigiri Ashram

== Location ==
It is located at .

NH66 is the main connectivity and backwaters also.

== Economy ==
Sea food processing is the main industry. Shrimp farming, pisciculture and coir products manufacture are also means of livelihood.

== Notable people ==
- Karunakara Guru, founder of Santhigiri Ashram
- Mammootty, Malayalam cinema actor

== Schools ==
- Chandiroor GHSS
- Our Lady Of Mercy HSS
- Al Ameen Public School
- Jamia Milliyya Arabic college
- Heavens Qur'anic Pre-school

== Politics ==
- The main front is LDF. K.R Gauriamma represented this constituency until last term from the birth of Kerala. She belongs to JSS. Now Daleema represents the constituency.
