= Rajiv Anchal =

Indian film director and sculptor

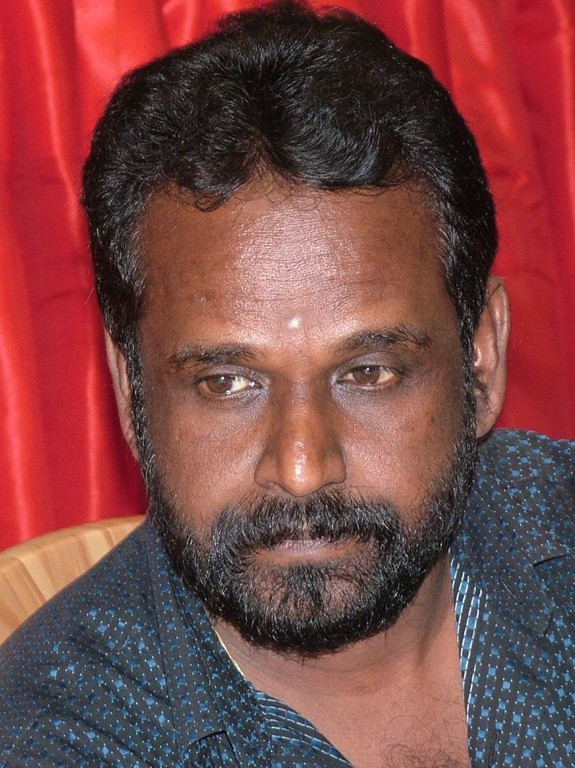
- Born: 20 December 1956 (age 69); Kerala, India
- Occupations: Filmmaker, sculptor
- Notable work: Guru (1997); Beyond The Soul (2003)

Rajiv Anchal (born 20 December 1956) is a film director, screenwriter, and sculptor who works in Malayalam cinema. In 1997, he made Guru, India's official submission for the Academy Award for Best Foreign Language Film. His first English language film was Beyond The Soul (2003).

== Sculptor ==
He contributed to the construction of the Parnashala at the Santhigiri Ashram and the large Jatayu bird sculpture in Jatayu Earth’s Center, Chadayamangalam, Kollam.

== Filmography ==
- Butterflies (1993)
- Kashmeeram (1994)
- Guru (1997)
- Rushy Vamsam (1999)
- Pilots (2000) (also as writer)
- Beyond the Soul (2002) (also as writer and producer)
- Nothing But Life (2004) (also as writer) / Made in USA
- Paattinte Palazhy (2010)
