= Aptha =

- VCD cover
- Directed by: Sanjeev Kumar
- Written by: Sanjeev Kumar
- Produced by: Dharmalingam; Megoti Sanjeev Kumar
- Starring: Pooja Gandhi; Neeraj Sham; Sadhu Kokila
- Music by: Skar Mario
- Distributed by: Rihan Enterprises
- Release date: 25 February 2011
- Country: India
- Language: Kannada

Aptha is a 2011 Indian Kannada thriller film directed by Sanjeev Kumar and starring Pooja Gandhi and Neeraj Sham in the lead roles. The film was released on 25 February 2011. The core storyline was inspired by the 2006 Malayalam movie Chinthamani Kolacase.

== Cast ==
- Pooja Gandhi as Anjali
- Neeraj Sham as Vijay
- Sadhu Kokila
- Pragna
- Poonam
- Bhavyakala
- Manasi Vasudevan
- Bullet Prakash
- Gaurav Saudagar
- Ajinkya Saudagar
- Santosh Balaji as Guna

== Reception ==
=== Critical response ===
A critic from The Times of India scored the film at 3 out of 5 stars and says "While Pooja Gandhi, who comes only in the second half, impresses with matured acting, Neeraj has a long way to go as a hero. Balaji makes for an impressive villain. Music by Escar Mario and cinematography by P S Baba fail to make an impression".
