= Dhruvam =

1993 Malayalam film

- Promotion poster
- Directed by: Joshiy
- Written by: Story: A. K. Sajan; Screenplay & Dialogues: S. N. Swamy
- Produced by: M. Mani
- Starring: Mammootty; Jayaram; Suresh Gopi; Vikram; Tiger Prabhakar
- Cinematography: Dinesh Babu
- Edited by: K. Sankunny
- Music by: S. P. Venkatesh
- Distributed by: Sunitha Productions
- Release date: 27 January 1993
- Running time: 145 minutes
- Country: India
- Language: Malayalam

Dhruvam (transl. Pole) is a 1993 Indian Malayalam-language action drama film directed by Joshiy, story and dialogue by S. N. Swamy and A. K. Sajan, respectively, and screenplay by S. N. Swamy. It stars an ensemble cast, including Mammootty in the lead with Jayaram, Suresh Gopi, Vikram, Janardhanan, Gauthami, and Tiger Prabhakar. The musical score and songs were composed by S. P. Venkatesh. It was Vikram's debut in Malayalam cinema and his fifth movie.The film was a blockbuster and ran for 200 days in theatres. It is considered to be one of the best movies in Mammootty 's career.

== Plot ==
An araachar (hangman) from Tamil Nadu is hired by the prison authorities to hang Hyder Marakkar, a notorious gangster with terrorist links. However, the hangman is killed in a road accident. DIG Marar smells foul play as the hangmen are either murdered, bribed, or threatened. Marar's efforts to bring the hangmen from other states are also in vain as all of them are simply too afraid to hang Marakkar. He goes to Kamakshipuram along with a young police officer named Jose Nariman, to meet Narasimha Mannadiar, a revered feudal lord and member of the royal family who had once ruled the hamlet and is worshipped and revered by his villagers. Mannadiar is known for his generous and fearless attitude, and his thirst for justice and peace for his village has made him an enemy in the eyes of politicians and a certain group of cops. While searching for the state's hangman, Mannadiar and Marar luckily meet the hangman's brother, Kasi, who agrees to hang Marakkar. Upon Nariman's request, Mannadiar's secretary, Ponmani, shares a few stories from Mannadiar's life that made him popular. One among them was shared with his younger brother, Veerasimha Mannadiar.

Veeran was in love with Maya and had informed Mannadiar about it. A few days before the marriage, a young man named Bhadran arrives at Mannadiar's house and tells him that he is in love with Maya. He also adds that her parents had agreed to the marriage without Maya's consent. Mannadiar calls off Veeran's marriage and gets Maya and Bhadran married. Bhadran was a gang member of Marakkar, who did not want to kill the DIG. Hence, Bhadran was a target of the gang. Veeran saves Bhadran and the latter is appointed as Mannadiar's driver. Marakkar kills Marar's son and also kills Veeran as he would have been an eyewitness. From that day onwards, Mannadiar waits for the chance to avenge his brother's death. Upon hearing the story, Nariman decides to help Mannadiar. Although convicted by the court for execution, Marakkar tries every possible way to escape. Mannadiar and Bhadran get themselves taken to the prison where Marakkar is kept. While transferring Marakkar to another prison, Mannadiar, along with Bhadran, kidnaps him with Nariman's assistance. Marakkar challenges Mannadiar to a fair fight in which he initially overpowers Mannadiar, who soon gets the better of him. In order to save Mannadiar from a bomb thrown by Marakkar's associates, Nariman catches the bomb and falls on it, which explodes, killing him. Mannadiar kills Marakkar's associates with a gun and hangs Marakkar from a tree to death. At the court, Mannadiar takes full responsibility for the murders, thereby making Bhadran a pardoned-witness and Mannadiar receives a death sentence from the court.

== Cast ==
- Mammootty as Narasimha Mannadiar
- Jayaram as Veerasimha Mannadiar
- Suresh Gopi as SI Jose Nariman
- Vikram as Bhadran
- Gautami as Mythili, Mannadiar's wife
- Rudra as Maya. Bhadran's wife
- Tiger Prabhakar as Hyder Marakkar (voiceover by Shammi Thilakan)
- Janardhanan as DIG Marar IPS
- T. G. Ravi as Kasi, new hangman
- Vijayaraghavan as SP Ramdas IPS
- Shammi Thilakan as Ali, Marakkar's brother
- Santhosh as Hassan, Marakkar's brother
- K. P. A. C. Azeez as Nambiar
- Babu Namboothiri as Ponmani
- M. S. Thripunithura as Kunjikkannan, Maya's father
- P. K. Abraham as Chidambaram, Mythili's father
- Delhi Ganesh as Ramayyan
- Appa Haja as Prathapan, Marar's Son
- Kollam Thulasi as MLA Chekutty
- Subair as doctor
- Ravi Vallathol as Circle Inspector
- Aliyar as doctor

== Production ==
Joshiy cast Vikram after seeing his photo in a Tamil magazine. The film was shot in Thiruvananathapuram.

== Music ==
The songs and background score were composed by S. P. Venkatesh.

Song	Duration	Artist	Lyricist
"Karukavayal Kuruvi" (Female Version)	04:04	K. S. Chithra	Shibu Chakravarthy
"Karukavayal Kuruvi" (Duet Version)	04:02	K. S. Chitra, G. Venugopal	Shibu Chakravarthy
"Thumbippenne" (Male Lead)	05:09	KJ Yesudas, Sujatha Mohan	Shibu Chakravarthy
"Thumbippenne" (Female Lead)	04:59	KJ Yesudas, Sujatha Mohan	Shibu Chakravarthy
"Varavarnnini"	01:22	K. S. Chitra	Shibu Chakravarthy

== Release ==
The film was released on 27 January 1993 and was a blockbuster at the box office.
