= Chakram (2003 film) =

- Promotional poster
- Directed by: A. K. Lohithadas
- Written by: A. K. Lohithadas
- Produced by: Krishnaraj
- Starring: Prithviraj Sukumaran; Meera Jasmine; Vijeesh Parthasarathi; Chandra Laxman
- Cinematography: Rajeev Ravi
- Edited by: Raja Mohammad
- Music by: Raveendran; Rajamani (Score)
- Production company: Kittu Ammini Arts
- Distributed by: Mudra Arts
- Release date: 27 December 2003
- Running time: 135 minutes
- Country: India
- Language: Malayalam

Chakram (transl. Wheel) is a 2003 Indian Malayalam-language action thriller film written and directed by A. K. Lohithadas. The film stars Prithviraj Sukumaran, Meera Jasmine, Binoy, Vijeesh, and Chandra Laxman, who had acted alongside Prithviraj in Stop Violence (2002).

== Premise ==
Chandrahasan, a truck driver, falls in love with Indrani and marries her. His life takes an unexpected turn when his best friend Giri kidnaps Indrani and he sets out to rescue her.

== Cast ==
- Prithviraj Sukumaran as Chandrahasan
- Meera Jasmine as Indrani
- Chandra Lakshman as Madhuri
- Vijeesh Parthasarathi as Premkumar
- Binoy as Giri
- Aniyappan as Manoharan
- Machan Varghese as Maniyannan
- Meghanathan as Cheetu Gopalan
- Baburaj as Sudhakaran
- Manju Pathrose as Deepa
- Santhosh Keezhattoor as Satheeshan
- Geetha Nair as Chandrahasan's mother
- Ambika Mohan as Madhuri's mother
- Shaju Sreedhar as Sebastian
- Priyanka as Kusumam, Maniyan's wife
- Kalabhavan Shajohn as Velu

== Production ==
The film was originally planned with Mohanlal, Dileep and Vidya Balan in the lead roles, with Kamal as the director. After few days of filming, the project was shelved. Chakram was supposed to be the acting debut of Vidya Balan.

== Music ==
The film's soundtrack contains 6 songs, all composed by Raveendran with lyrics by Gireesh Puthanchery.

#	Title	Singer(s)
1	"Koothu Kummi"	Vijay Yesudas, Subharanjini
2	"Koothu Kummi(F)"	Subharanjini
3	"Parannu Parannu Paarum"	K. J. Yesudas, K.S Chithra
4	"Pattam Kanakkinu"	M.G. Sreekumar
5	"Doore Puzhayude"	K. J. Yesudas
