= Parnasala of Santhigiri =

Monument in Santhigiri Ashram, India

Coordinates: 08°37′56″N 76°53′50″E

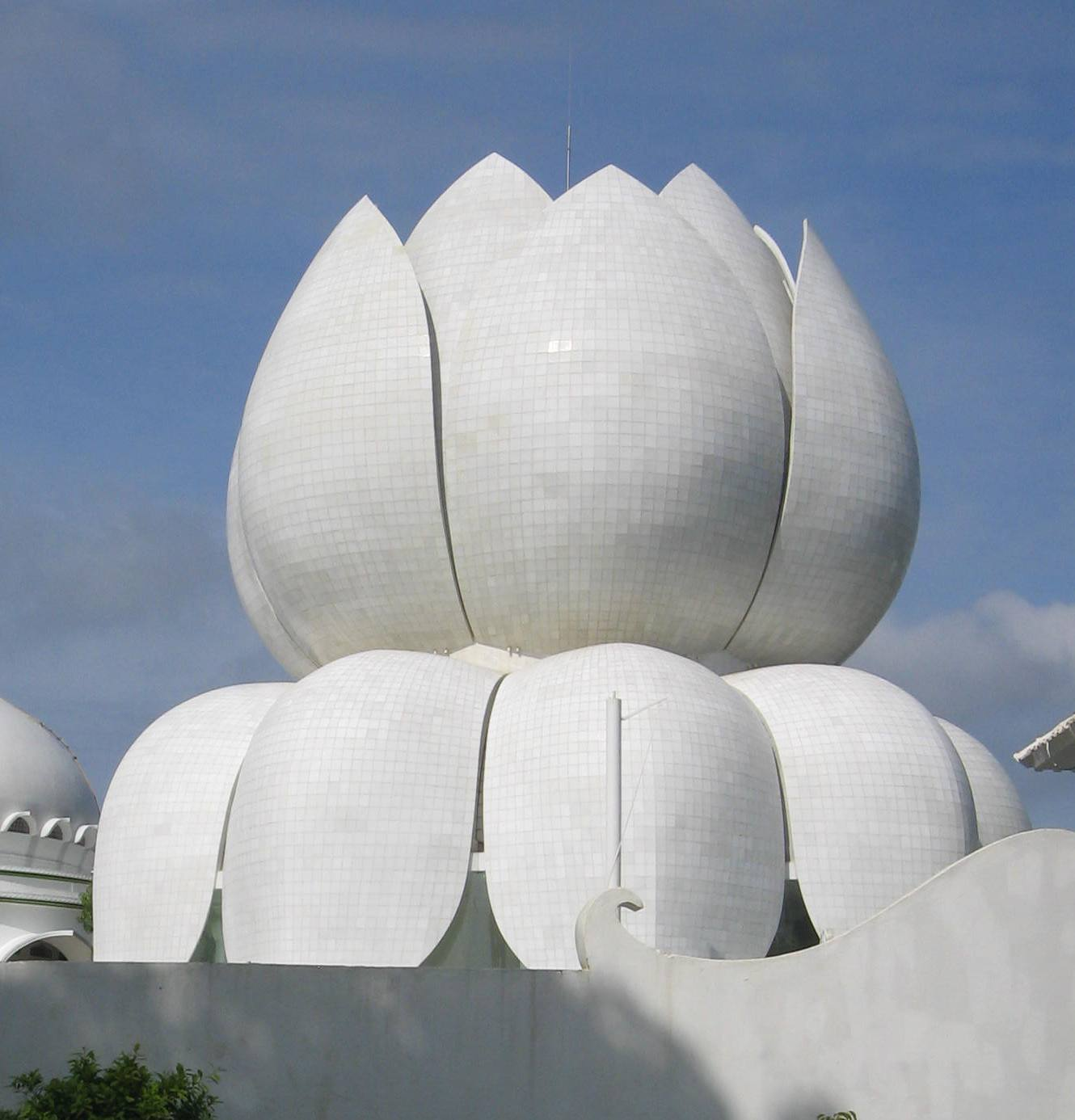
Santhigiri Ashram

Parnasala is a monument in the shape of a full bloomed lotus in white marble, located at Santhigiri Ashram, 21 km from Kerala's capital Thiruvananthapuram. The monument is at the final resting place of Navajyothisree Karunakara Guru (1927–99), the founder of Santhigiri Ashram.

The Parnasala, which rises to a height of 91 ft., was inaugurated by the then President of India, Pratibha Devisingh Patil, on 13 August 2010. It was opened to the public on 12 September 2010.

== History and significance ==
Navajyothisree Karunakara Guru was born on 1 September 1927, in a simple family in Chandiroor village in the Alappuzha district of Kerala.

The foundation stone for the Lotus Parnasala was placed on 17 November 1999. The construction work went on uninterrupted for ten years.

== Design and dimensions ==
The Parnasala is not designed by a professional architect. Its shape and structure were conceived by the head of Santhigiri Ashram, Sishyapoojitha Amritha Jnana Thapaswini, in inner visions. Nearly 100,000 Sq. Ft. of the milky white marble was specially mined at Makrana in Rajasthan and transported to Santhigiri Ashram for the Parnasala. The world-famous Makrana marble has been the stone of choice for use in renowned monuments such as the Taj Mahal. Black granite was specially mined in Chamrajnagar district in Karnataka for the Parnasala. The Parnasala consists of 21 marble overlaid petals supported on 21 pillars. While 12 petals, signifying the 12 zodiac divisions, are located in the upper layer, 9 petals, signifying the 9 planets, unfurl in the lower layer. Similarly, there are nine inner and 12 outer pillars. There is a passage for the movement of devotees between the inner and outer pillars. At the heart of the Parnasala is a cubicle in the shape of a lotus bud, which is carved out of teak wood and has the inner walls encased in brass plates. The Guru’s sacred body has been placed in a marble casket inside this wooden sanctum. A life-size image of Guru, sculpted in gold, has been placed in the sanctum atop a platform made of black granite. Eleven steps, also made of black granite, lead to the platform. The Parnasala rises to a height of 91 ft. and is 84 ft wide. The inner circle has a width of 64 ft. The 12 upward petals measure 41 ft. each while the 9 downward petals measure 31 ft. The teak wood sanctum has a height of 27 feet and 21 ft. diameter. A parasol with a diameter of 36 ft. shades over the sanctum. In front of the sanctum is a ceremonial platform with intricate wooden carvings and artwork.

== Dedication and opening ceremonies ==
The Lotus Parnasala was formally dedicated to humanity by the President of India, Pratibha Devisingh Patil, at a special function at Santhigiri Ashram on 13 August 2010. Kerala's Governor, Sri R. S. Gavai, presided over the function, which was also attended by Kerala's Home Minister, Sri Kodiyeri Balakrishnan and Member of Parliament Shashi Tharoor. Speaking on the occasion, the President described Navajyothisree Karunakara Guru as a great visionary who believed in a casteless society based on strong family values. The lotus-shaped Parnasala is a befitting tribute to the Guru, who always said the religion he believed is that of love, tolerance and fraternity, she added.

=== Parnasala dedication programmes ===
The President also inaugurated a month-long Parnasala Dedication Celebration which included events such as an ‘International Conference on Global Warming, Climate Change, Sustainable Development and Secular Spirituality, which was inaugurated by the President of East Timor and the 1996 Nobel Peace Laureate, Mr. Jose Ramos-Horta. Other events included a ‘National Spiritual Congress’, an Arts and Cultural Festival called ‘Kalanjali’, a national products and crafts exhibition called ‘Santhigiri Expo’, ‘Edu. Fest’ for school and college students, a Middle East Health and Research Seminar and a Media Seminar.

=== Opening day ===
‘Prakashathinte Divasam’ (The Day of the Supreme Light) was celebrated by Santhigiri Ashram on 12 September 2010, the 84th birthday of Navajyothisree Karunakara Guru, to mark the opening of the Parnasala for public worship by Sishyapoojitha Amritha Jnana Thapaswini. India’s Defence Minister, A. K. Antony, was the first national leader to offer flowers in the monument on that day [15].
