= Black Coffee (2021 film) =

2021 Malayalam film

- Directed by: Baburaj
- Written by: Baburaj
- Produced by: Sajeesh Manjeri
- Starring: Baburaj; Lal; Sunny Wayne; Oviya; Shwetha Menon
- Cinematography: James Chris
- Edited by: Sandeep Nandakumar
- Music by: Bijibal
- Distributed by: Vishwadeepti films
- Release date: 19 February 2021
- Country: India
- Language: Malayalam

Black Coffee is a 2021 Indian Malayalam-language comedy-drama film directed by Baburaj and produced by Sajesh Manjeri.[1] The film is a loose sequel to the 2011 movie Salt N' Pepper.[2][3] It marked the return of Oviya to Malayalam cinema after a gap of 10 years.

== Synopsis ==
Following the events of Salt N' Pepper, cook Babu is staying with Kalidas and Maya. Due to some misunderstanding with Maya, Babu leaves their place and goes to Kochi. There, he meets a woman named Ann Mary Cheriyan who asks him to buy a drink. She takes him to the flat where she stays with 3 other women, Malu, Gayathri and Kshema and Babu, stays with them as their cook. The women face some problems, which Babu's help sorts out. The rest of the movie deals with the consequences and how it is handled by the others.

== Cast ==
- Baburaj as Cook Babu
- Lal as Kalidasan
- Sunny Wayne as Davis
- Oviya as Marina Louis (Malu)
- Shwetha Menon as Maya
- Lena as Ann Mary Cheriyan
- Rachana Narayanankutty as Gayathri
- Orma Bose as Kshema
- Shiyas Kareem as Roshan
- Sruthi Vipin as Manju
- Pradeep Kottayam
- Idavela Babu
- Subeesh Sudhi
- Sudheer Karamana as James
- Salu Kuttanadu as Flat Security
- Saju Kodiyan as Flat Caretaker
- Ambika Mohan
- Thesni Khan as Raasathi Tamannah
- Sunil Sainudeen as Abdul
- Urmila Unni as Susy
- Spadikam George
- Ponnamma Babu
- Molly Kannamaly
- Naseer Sankranthi
- Kelu Mooppan
- Ratheesh Nambiar as Food Delivery Boy

== Reception ==
Times of India gave a rating of 3 out of 5 for Black Coffee.
