= Black Dalia =

- Directed by: Baburaj
- Written by: Baburaj
- Produced by: M. K. Muhammed
- Starring: Vani Viswanath; Baburaj
- Cinematography: P. Sukumar
- Edited by: Don Max
- Music by: Sayan Anwar
- Release date: 30 April 2009
- Country: India
- Language: Malayalam

Black Dalia is a 2009 Indian Malayalam film directed by Baburaj (in his directorial debut). The film stars Suresh Gopi, Vani Viswanath and Baburaj with Cherrie Minhas, Tami Dushyantha, Suja Naidu, Teena Ponnamma, Ruksha, Jisna Ali, Althara, Kavitha Nair, Pavithra and Thegika in other important roles. This film was dubbed in Telugu as Anthima Theerpu. This movie is inspired from 1997 American slasher movie I know What You Did Last Summer.

In the film, Suresh Gopi's character is named after the character he played in the Tamil film Dheena (2001).

== Plot ==
A student of Sacred Heart Medical College is found murdered in mysterious circumstances. Police begin the investigation but soon two more girls are found murdered in the college campus. DIG Daisy Wilfred, IPS takes charge of the investigation.

== Cast ==
- Suresh Gopi as Dr. Aadikesavan (cameo appearance)
- Vani Viswanath as DIG Daisy Wilfred IPS
- Baburaj as CI Anwar Ali
- Sai Kumar as Sirajuddin
- Jagathy Sreekumar
- Vijayaraghavan as IG Mathew K. John IPS
- Devan as Raveendren
- Arun as Vivek Aravindakshan
- Abu Salim
- Kollam Thulasi as Kariyachan
- Sadiq as James
- Saju Kodiyan
- Seema
- Kalasala Babu as Sibi Kuruvila
- Urmila Unni
- Geetha Vijayan
- Mythili Roy as Dalia
- Anil Murali as Alex
- Nawab Shah as Robert
- Pavithra as Linda Disuza
- Suja Naidu as Jessica
- Tami Dushyantha as Sameera Daniel
- Teena Ponnamma as Srada C.K.
- Ruksha as Maria Mary John
- Jisna Ali as Rashida
- Althara as Aathira Nair
- Kavitha Nair as Jasmine
- Thegika as Avanthika
- Cherrie Minhas as Samantha
- Gomathy Mahadevan as Dr.Sherly Thomas
- Lakshmi Gopalaswamy
- Chali Pala as DYSP Ramachandran Kurup
- Nishan K. P. Nanaiah
- Shritha Sivadas

== Reception ==
Sify.com wrote "It may not have the kind of finesse or the brilliance that is seen in many of the well-taken mystery thrillers, but still this one can easily be classified as a watchable fare. Go without much expectation and chances are that you may find it enjoyable". Paresh C Palicha from Rediff.com wrote "Suresh Gopi appears sincere in the couple of scenes he is allotted, as if he is carrying the film on his shoulders. Vani Vishvanath gets a big chunk of screen-time and she devours it. Babu Raj is good as the bad guy, the subordinate of Vani Vishvanath. However, the final verdict is that this Black Dahlia withers away before it can even blossom".
