= Manushyamrugam =

Manushya Mrugam
- Film poster
- Directed by: Baburaj
- Written by: Baburaj
- Produced by: Vani Viswanath
- Starring: Prithviraj Sukumaran; Kiran Rathod; Oviya; Baburaj
- Cinematography: K. V. Suresh; Dilshad. V. A.
- Edited by: Don Max
- Music by: Sayan Anwar
- Production company: VB Creations
- Release date: 15 July 2011
- Country: India
- Language: Malayalam

Manushya Mrugam (Trans. Anthropomorphic Man) is a 2011 Indian Malayalam-language mystery film written, directed and starring Baburaj in the lead role and Prithviraj Sukumaran in Police office Role. It was produced by his wife Vani Viswanath; the film co-stars Kiran Rathod, and Oviya. The story is about sexual exploitation of young girls. The film was released on 15 July 2011. It was dubbed and released in Tamil as Police Rajyam (2017) and in Hindi as Police Raaj (2020).

== Plot ==
Johnny is a lorry driver with an insatiable sex drive. Married to Lissy, he has an eye for a young girl Sophie who has come to stay with them. He repeatedly tries to goad her to marry him, but she doesn't comply and Lissy gets angry on his behaviour and scolds him. In a fit of rage, he kills Lissy with a knife and rapes and kills Sophie and his eleven-year-old daughter Jeena. He is arrested and sent to the jail where he gets tortured by his jail mates.

Crime Branch Officer David J Mathew goes probing into the case and finds out that Johnny killed another person during the crime. When David and his men questions him, Johnny tells that the 4th person whom he killed was Kamal Pasha, a young man who hails from Bangalore. He reveals that he didn't kill his family and Pasha was the one who killed them. He reveals that Pasha was in love with Lissy but she didn't accept it and he was arrested for a false case made by her father Kochupaulose for loving her. Lissy didn't tell Johnny about Pasha as she didn't want Pasha to be killed by Johnny and she wants to live with him and Jeena. Johnny overhears the conversation between them. He also hears that Lissy was pregnant with Pasha's child and the child was Jeena. He tries to tell her that Jeena is his daughter but she says that Jeena is Johnny's daughter. Pasha wanted to take Lissy with him but she refuses. Angrily, Pasha goes to their house and kills Sophie and Jeena. When Lissy finds them dead, she slashes him on his hand with a knife and in a fit of rage, Pasha kills Lissy. In revenge, Johnny kills Pasha and throws his body to the river.

He tells the police that he killed his family as he considered it as a punishment of him planning to marry Sophie and for Lissy who planned a new life. He tells David to not tell the truth to anyone. David and his men report to the media that Johnny killed Pasha and his family when Lissy planned to marry Sophie to Pasha, to save her from Johnny and he couldn't tolerate it. He plans to reveal the truth once when they find Pasha's corpse.

== Cast ==
- Prithviraj Sukumaran as Crime Branch SP David J. Mathew IPS
- Baburaj as Tipper Johnny
- Kiran Rathod as Lissy, Johnny's wife
- Oviya as Sophie
- Kalabhavan Mani as CI K. Rajeev
- Jagathy Sreekumar as Fr. Isaac Chacko
- Aishwarya as Charayam Mary
- Adithya as Kamal Pasha
- Vijaya Rangaraju as Para Vasu
- Indrans as Sexton Jackson
- Abu Salim as Prisoner Salim
- Bheeman Raghu as (Song appearance)
- Kollam Thulasi as Jail SP Rasheed
- Harisree Ashokan as Advocate Shamsuddin Valiyaveettil
- Devan as Olikkal Kochupaulose, Lissy's father
- Spadikam George as DYSP George Jacob
- Mammukoya as Tea Shop man Anthony
- Majeed as Magistrate
- Chali Pala as Prosecution Advocate (voice dubbed)
- Kalashala Babu as Andrews, quarry Owner
- Seema as Paramada Janu, Vasu's wife
- Ponnamma Babu as Lissy's mother
- Kulappulli Leela as Thressiamma
- Baby Anusree as Jeena, Johnny's daughter

== Production ==
Manushya Mrugam is the second directorial of actor Baburaj, scripted by himself and produced by his wife Vani Viswanath. The film is not related to the 1980 Malayalam film of the same name. The film features music composed by Sayan Anwar, while the lyrics were penned by Vayalar Sarath Chandra Varma.

== Soundtrack ==
1. Ashwaroodanaya – Jassie Gift

2. Aalin Kombil – Manjari

3. Nerinu Verulla – Benny Dayal
