= Kashmeeram =

- VCD cover
- Directed by: Rajiv Anchal
- Written by: A. K. Sajan
- Produced by: Menaka
- Starring: Suresh Gopi; Sharada; Priya Raman; Lalu Alex; Ratheesh; Krishna Kumar; Tej Sapru
- Cinematography: Saloo George
- Edited by: N. Gopalakrishnan
- Music by: M. G. Radhakrishnan; S. P. Venkatesh (Score)
- Production company: Revathy Kalamandhir
- Release date: 1994
- Country: India
- Language: Malayalam

Kashmeeram is a 1994 Indian Malayalam-language action film directed by Rajiv Anchal, written by A. K. Sajan and produced by Menaka under Revathy Kalamandhir. Starring Suresh Gopi, Sharada, Priya Raman, Lalu Alex, Ratheesh and Tej Sapru, it was dubbed and released in Telugu as Kaashmir.

== Plot ==
The film starts in New Delhi where NSG Captain Shyam, leader of a Black Cat Commando Team, captures a wanted terrorist named Jagmohan Pandey for murdering a high ranking police officer. Usha Varma, a judge of the Supreme Court and the older sister of Home Secretary Rajagopal "Rajan" Varma, presides over Pandey's trial. In retaliation for Pandey's arrest and trial, Pandey's close friend Lakan Abbas Qureshi, an infamous terrorist leader, kills Usha's son Unnikrishnan in a bomb blast, but his family or police wouldn't know of the victim's identity until later.

However, following this incident the Home department puts up Z Category protection detail for Usha and her family. Deputy Inspector General Balram gives the assignment to a commando team led by Shyam. Usha and her daughter Manasi Varma, both don't approve of the security cover. They show their dislike by behaving rudely towards the entire team, especially Shyam whose no-nonsense attitude makes things worse. Further, Shyam ends up being humiliated and scoffed at a number of times by Usha Varma's family. A servant at the judge's residence, Sukhram, is found to be a spy and reveals under interrogation that it was Unni who has been assassinated in the earlier bomb explosion. However, Rajan and Balram decide to keep the news a secret. Later Shyam reveals the truth about Unni's death to Usha's housekeeper Mariya Singh to ensure her cooperation with his duty to protect the judge.

When Shyam and his commando team inadvertently kill Manasi's boyfriend Nathuram for trying to trespass into Usha's house, Manasi's anger towards Shyam is intensified. Usha removes Shyam's team from duty with intentions to put Shyam on trial for Nathuram's death. However, this backfires horribly as Manasi, while without any protection detail, ends up being kidnapped by her colleague Sanjay who is working for Qureshi. Sanjay remorsefully confesses to Manasi about Unni's death and that Nathuram is actually Qureshi's son Aashiq Quais who was sent to infiltrate Usha's house and assassinate her. With these horrible revelations and being subjected to threats by an angry Qureshi, Manasi becomes completely distressed.

Qureshi then makes a call to Usha, informing that he has kidnapped Manasi and issues an ultimatum: Usha must drop all charges against Pandey and set him free, otherwise Manasi will be executed. Around the same time, Rajan and Balram comes open to Usha and the rest of the family about Unni's death and Nathuram's identity. Shattered by these horrible revelations, Usha apologizes to Shyam and asks for his team to be her security detail until she gives the verdict in Pandey's case. Sanjay tries to rectify his actions by secretly calling Balram, but gets caught and killed by Qureshi. Rajan, Shyam and Balram then formulate a plan for action: Usha will release Pandey and have him sent back to the terrorist group and during the exchange, Shyam will pose himself as Pandey to fool Qureshi and the terrorists into releasing Manasi.

Though the plan for the exchange was a success, Pandey escapes and signals Qureshi and the terrorists about the 'switch', causing a firefight between the Black Cat Commandos and the terrorist group. The commandos are able to hold back the terrorists as Shyam rescues Manasi. However, Balram is shot dead by Pandey in the fight. The fight ends soon with Shyam killing both Qureshi and Pandey and most of the terror group killed.

The film ends with Usha's family at an airport coming across Shyam who is now commanding the security detail for the Governor of Kashmir. A grateful Manasi apologizes to Shyam for her rude behavior towards him with a warm gaze which Shyam seems to accept with a subtle smile.

== Cast ==
- Suresh Gopi as Captain Shyam Mohan Varma, an NSG Officer
- Sharada as Justice Usha S. Varma, Judge of the Supreme Court
- Priya Raman as Manasi Varma, Usha's daughter and Rajan's niece
- Lalu Alex as Rajagopal "Rajan" Varma IAS, Home Secretary of India and Usha's brother
- Ratheesh as DIG Balram IPS
- Sukumari as Mariya Singh, Usha's housekeeper
- Suchitra as Mithra R. Varma, Rajan's daughter
- Krishna Kumar as Unnikrishnan "Unni" Varma, Usha's son and Rajan's nephew
- Tej Sapru as Lakan Abbas Qureshi, an infamous terrorist leader
- Madhupal as Aashiq Quais (Nathuram), Abbas's son posing as an NRI video producer
- Bobby Kottarakkara as Kuttan Chatterji, Usha's chef
- Nandu as Sanjay, drama school student and a terrorist ally

== Soundtrack ==
All lyrics are written by Gireesh Puthenchery; all music is composed by M. G. Radhakrishnan.

No.	Title	Artist(s)	Length
1.	"Masthikiye Rath"	Malgudi Subha, Murali Krishna
2.	"Novumidanenchil"	M. G. Sreekumar
3.	"Poru Nee Vaarilam" (Female)	K. S. Chithra
4.	"Poru Nee Vaarilam" (Male)	M. G. Sreekumar
