= A. K. Sajan =

Indian film director

- Born: Kerala, India
- Occupations: Film director; Screenwriter
- Years active: 1989 – present
- Relatives: A. K. Santhosh (brother)

A. K. Sajan is an Indian screenwriter and film director who is best known for his directorial debut Stop Violence (2002). The film stars Prithviraj Sukumaran and Chandra Lakshman. He is also known for scripting many movies in the industry. His notable works include Dhruvam (1993), Butterflies (1993), Kashmeeram (1994), Crime File (1999), Chinthamani Kolacase (2006), Nadiya Kollappetta Rathri (2007) and Puthiya Niyamam (2016).

His brother A. K. Santhosh is also a scriptwriter and have scripted various movies like Sooryaputhran, Minnaminuginum Minnukettu and a Tamil-Malayalam bilingual movie Vandae Maatharam. Sajan's last movie was Pulimada (2023) starring Joju George, which was a flop.

== Career ==
Began his film career as a story writer for some movies in late 1980s. In the early 1990 he pitched the story idea of Dhruvam (1993), and began to pen the script. By mid 1991 with the completed draft he approached Joshiy, and the film started to roll. His next movie Butterflies (1993) with Mohanlal also turned out to be a blockbuster.

In 1994, Kashmeeram (1994) with Suresh Gopi in the lead emerged as a super hit which reaffirmed stardom for Suresh Gopi. From there on, they both established as a pair and later worked on several films together. Their notable films were Kashmeeram (1994), Crime File (1999), Chinthamani Kolacase (2006) and Nadiya Kollappetta Rathri (2007).

His directorial debut was in 2002 with the movie Stop Violence starring Prithviraj Sukumaran in the lead. The movie depicted the life of dark underworld prevailed in the city of Kochi. Upon its release it garnered critical acclaim for its bold and realistic approach in making.

== Filmography ==
Year	Film	Credited as				Notes
Year	Film	Director	Screenplay	Story	Dialogue	Notes
2026	Varavu	✗	✓	✗	✗	
2023	Pulimada	✓	✓	✓	✓	Also Editor
2018	Neeyum Njanum	✓	✓	✓	✓	
2017	Sathya		✓	✓	✓	
2016	Puthiya Niyamam	✓	✓	✓	✓	
2013	Veedi Kumaranthe Kadha		✓	✓	✓	
2012	Asuravithu	✓	✓	✓	✓	
2012	Osho	✓	✓	✓	✓	
2010	Dhrona 2010		✓	✓	✓	
2010	Pampa	✓	✓	✓	✓	
2009	Red Chillies		✓	✓	✓	
2007	Nadiya Kollappetta Rathri		✓	✓	✓	
2006	Lanka	✓	✓	✓	✓	
2006	Chinthamani Kolacase		✓	✓	✓	
2004	Aparichithan		✓	✓	✓	
2002	Stop Violence	✓				
2001	Sharja To Sharja		✓	✓	✓	
1999	Crime File		✓	✓	✓	
1998	Meenathil Thalikettu		✓		✓	
1998	Sooryaputhran		✓	✓	✓	
1997	Janathipathyam		✓	✓	✓	
1995	Manikya Chempazhukka		✗	✓	✗	
1994	Kashmeeram		✓	✓	✓	
1993	Butterflies		✓	✓	✓	
1993	Dhruvam			✓	✓	
