= Nothing but Life =

- Malayalam version poster
- Directed by: Rajiv Anchal
- Written by: Bobby Nair
- Produced by: Naveen Chathappuram
- Starring: R. Madhavan; Neha Pendse; Kaveri; Nassar; Sreenivasan
- Cinematography: Keith Gruchala
- Edited by: Ajoy Varma
- Music by: Vidyasagar; Biju Kurian; Ouseppachan
- Production company: Golden Wings Studio
- Distributed by: Mudra Arts
- Release dates: 25 December 2004 (English); 6 May 2005 (Malayalam)
- Running time: 120 minutes
- Languages: Malayalam; English

Nothing but Life is a 2004 Indian Malayalam language film and directed by Rajiv Anchal. The experimental film featured actors R. Madhavan, Neha Pendse, Kaveri, Nassar and Sreenivasan. The film was made simultaneously in Malayalam and released later on as Made in USA on May 6, 2005.

== Plot ==
Roby Thomas migrates to the U.S. with the help of a priest and works as a barman in a casino in Las Vegas. Roby is a simple youngster who believes in helping people in distress but he has a suicidal tendency. The film focuses on the inner turmoil of a youngster who seems to have a positive attitude towards life and emphasizes the importance of inter-personal relationship and friendship.

== Cast ==
| Cast (English) | Cast (Malayalam) | Role |
|---|---|---|
| R. Madhavan | | Roby Thomas |
| Kaveri | | Vandhana |
| Neha Pendse | | Rachel |
| Thampi Antony | | Colonel Abdullah |
| Nassar | Sreenivasan | Doctor Maddy |
| Innocent | | Prof. Ponnachan PhD |
| Babu Antony | | Omar (special appearance) |
| Madhupal | | Johnny |
| John Weltz | Nassar | Rachel's father |

== Production ==
Madhavan signed the film in June 2004 and began shooting for the film almost immediately. The film was initially titled Life in Las Vegas, before the makers decided on different titles in English and Malayalam. Actress Kaveri as heroine and actress Neha Pendse made her debut in South Indian films, whilst Nassar and Sreenivasan reprised the roles of the doctor alternatively in the English and Malayalam versions respectively. The film was shot within 40 days in Las Vegas, Albuquerque and New Mexico in the United States, whilst scenes were later recorded in New York City. The movie was shot using high-density television camera with cine lenses instead of a TV lens.

== Soundtrack ==
The soundtrack for this film was composed by Vidyasagar and Biju Kurian. Biju Kurian has composed a song for the film, Vidyasagar has composed the remainder. Lyricists were O. N. V. Kurup and Rajiv Alunkal. The background score for this film was recorded by Ouseppachan.

Made in USA

Soundtrack album by Vidyasagar
- Released: 2005
- Genre: World Music
- Producer: Vidyasagar

Vidyasagar chronology
| Chanthupottu (2005) | Made in USA (2005) | Kochirajavu (2005) |

| # | Title | Singer(s) | Composer | Lyricist |
|---|---|---|---|---|
| 1 | "Chirapuraathana" | K. J. Yesudas | Vidyasagar | O. N. V. Kurup |
| 2 | "Ilamaan Azhake" | Aparna Rajeev | Biju Kurian | Rajeev Alunkal |
| 3 | "Punnellin Kathirola" | Aparna Rajeev | Vidyasagar | O. N. V. Kurup |
| 4 | "Punnellin Kathirola" | P. Jayachandran | Vidyasagar | O. N. V. Kurup |
| 5 | "Thaazhunna Sooryane" | Sujatha | Vidyasagar | O. N. V. Kurup |

== Release ==
The English version played across film festivals such as at the Kerala International Film Festival. The Malayalam version of the film opened to audiences in Kerala on 6 May 2005 gathering mixed reviews. Whilst one reviewer cited that "given the present crisis in Malayalam films where good themes are in short supply, "Made in USA" is certainly a welcome change"; another cited that the movie "left audience confused", describing the film as "plainly mediocre". The film became a financial failure at the Kerala box office, gaining poor collections.

The English version prepared for a release in India in August 2006, with director indicating that the film will be released across multiplex cinemas nationwide. The film won Surya S. Nair a Kerala State Award for her dubbing work in the Malayalam version of the film. The film was later dubbed in 2008 into Tamil and released as Ananda Punnagai, and then in Telugu as Anjali in America.
