= Asuravithu (2012 film) =

- Theatrical release poster
- Directed by: A. K. Sajan
- Written by: A. K. Sajan
- Produced by: Shaji Thanaparambil
- Starring: Asif Ali; Samvrutha Sunil; Baburaj; Lena; Siddique
- Cinematography: Vishnu Narayanan
- Edited by: Renjith Touchriver
- Music by: Alphons Joseph; Rajesh Mohan; Govind Menon
- Production company: Leela Creations
- Distributed by: Leela Media Release
- Release date: 6 January 2012; (India)
- Running time: 142 minutes
- Country: India
- Language: Malayalam

Asuravithu (transl. Demon Seed) is a 2012 Indian Malayalam-language action thriller written and directed by A. K. Sajan, starring Asif Ali and Samvrutha Sunil in the lead roles. The film is a sequel to the 2002 Malayalam-language thriller Stop Violence, starring Prithviraj Sukumaran in the leading role. The film opened to mixed reviews and was a box-office flop. This was the debut film of actor Mammootty's nephew Maqbool Salmaan. The movie was dubbed in Hindi as Duniya Meri Mutthi Mein.

== Plot ==
Don Bosco is a soft-spoken and religious young man who is studying in a seminary. He takes upon himself the task of bringing to heel the (Pathaam Kalam) gang, who killed his father years ago. Don meets head on with the Cochin underworld kings, and rechristens himself as Don Daveed. Henceforth his operations start bearing the brand of the D Company. The movie also has acid's son in the plot. He accompanies Don in the D company. It is shown that Don Bosco is the son of Daveed a.k.a. Satan.

== Cast ==
- Asif Ali as Don Bosco/ Don Daveed (Asuravithu), Satan Daveed's son
- Samvrutha Sunil as Marty, Don's love interest
- Maqbool Salmaan as Messy
- Aparna Nair as Veronica
- Jiya Irani as Aaron
- Vijayaraghavan as Abbaji
- Becky Thomas as Vanessa
- Jayashree Sivadhas as Siddique’s Daughter
- Vidyalakshmi as Ameera
- Rony David as Danny
- Siddique as ASP Shaikh Muhammed IPS
- Lena as Angel Daveed, Don's mother
- Baburaj as Father Ambarra Shaji
- I. M. Vijayan as Valarpadam Kurudhu Musthafa
- Anil Murali as DYSP Somashekharan
- Chali Pala as Lopez
- Seema G. Nair
- Mehul James
- Ganapathi S Poduval as Zacharia Samuel
- Gayathri
- Vishnu Unnikrishnan as Anand
- Jagannatha Varma as Bishop
- Harisree Ashokan as Father Mullu Murikan

== Soundtrack ==
The film's soundtrack includes the following songs:

Title	Composer	Lyricist	Singer(s)
Aashaamarathin Mele	Rajesh Mohan	Kaithapram	Vijay Yesudas
I Have Got You	Govind Menon	Ranjini Menon	Piyush Kapur
Kodunkaattaay	Rajesh Mohan	Santhosh Varma	Benny Dayal
