= Nadiya Kollappetta Rathri =

- Directed by: K. Madhu
- Written by: A. K. Sajan
- Produced by: K. Madhu
- Starring: Suresh Gopi; Kavya Madhavan; Siddique
- Cinematography: Anandakuttan
- Edited by: P. C. Mohanan; Vineeth Mohanan
- Music by: Rajamani
- Production company: Dream productions
- Release date: 27 July 2007
- Running time: 160 minutes
- Country: India
- Language: Malayalam

Nadiya Kollappetta Rathri (English: Night of Nadiya's Murder) is a 2007 Indian Malayalam-language thriller film by K. Madhu starring Suresh Gopi and Kavya Madhavan in lead roles. The film's plot is inspired by the 2007 Thai movie Alone which itself is loosely based on Agatha Christie's novel Elephants Can Remember.

== Plot ==
Internationally famous Indian sharp shooter Nadiya Mether, famous dancer Thulasimani, and television reporter Shreya Maria are all murdered in the same car on the Sauparnika Express between Chennai and Mangalore.

The other occupants in the car were: actress Priya Rose with her mother Rajamma and father; four doctors traveling together; Tamil Novelist Seetharaman; Palakkad Railway Police Superintendent Alexander Chempadan; Madhavan Master, his wife and their mentally unstable son Balu; the conductor; and the steward. As the train reaches Madukarai station, Nadiya is discovered and one of the doctors reports that Balu is holding a scalpel. Shreya is missing only to be later found dead beside the tracks near the city of Salem. Thulasimani is found hanging from the ceiling of her compartment which was locked from the inside. Investigators fail to solve the mystery and the case is turned over to DIG Sharafuddeen Taramasi, an IPS officer of the Tamil Nadu Cadre, presently posted as chief of the specialized unit for dealing with unsolved crimes and emergencies in railways, the Railway Anti-Criminal Task Force (RACT).

The conductor tells Sharafuddeen about seeing an additional passenger that night—Lakkidi Manikandan, a killer disguised as a police constable. After intense questioning Mani admits killing the reporter. She was tailing Superintendent Chempadan who was smuggling gold. Shreya followed him onto the train and into the car. However, Alexender had overheard Shreya on her mobile and had looked at her identity card. He arranged for Mani to board and throw her off the train near Salem, killing her.

Sharafuddeen examines Balu during drug-enhanced hypnosis. Balu recalls leaving his compartment to meet Priya, his crush from college. He finds Nadiya stabbed and the scalpel left behind. Balu picked it up just as the doctor saw him.

Priya's mother tells Sharafuddeen that she had borrowed a surgical blade from the doctors to slice mangoes. When it is revealed that the same blade was used to stab Nadiya, the mother says that she noticed someone entering Thulasimani's compartment. In an identification parade she picks out the steward. Upon questioning, he confesses murdering Thulasimani on the orders of his boss, division manager Vijayabhanu. Vijaybhanu was madly in love with Thulasi. He approached her many times but she rejected him, threatening to go public. She also secretly married her boyfriend, so Vijayabhanu killed her before she reached home.

Nadiya was brutally assaulted with teeth marks on her body and stab wounds at the base of her skull injuring her cerebellum. Sharafuddeen discovers that Nadiya and her identical twin sister Nadira were orphaned years earlier when he and a special team killed the twins' father, a thug and arms dealer. Eminent dancer Janaki Iyer raised the twins. Nadira grew up to be a professional dancer. Nadiya, holding a grudge against Sharaufuddeen for killing her father before her eyes, became an acclaimed shooter. Janaki arranged a marriage between Nadira and internationally acclaimed musician Zia Musafir, son of Janaki's devoted disciple Ustad Ghulam Musafir.

Sharafuddeen discovers that the train made a two-and-a-half hour service stop at Coimbatore station and wonders why Nadiya didn't travel the 35 minutes from the station to her academy. Earlier, in her home, someone had attacked Nadira from behind and she had bitten the attacker's hand hard. Sharafuddeen warns Nadira that her life is at risk now. The investigation discovers Nadiya had called the academy hours before being attacked. They find out that someone had entered Coimbatore station car park in the academy's official car. Sharafuddeen decides to take all the suspects and witnesses to Chennai by train. Onboard, he speculates to Nadira that Zia Musafir must have attacked Nadiya. Nadira defends Zia, getting so excited her nose bleeds. Sharafuddeen reveals that the woman standing before him is Nadiya, not Nadira. His right-hand man had attacked her in her home in order to get a bite sample from her. This sample matched the bite marks on Nadira.

Nadiya was infatuated with Zia, though he only loved Nadira. Nadira's boasts about Zia's love for her enraged Nadiya. Deciding to kill Nadira, Nadiya asked her to pick her up at Coimbatore Station. When Nadira arrived and boarded the train to fetch Nadiya, Nadiya stabbed her, bit Nadira's body to fake an assault, then switched clothes with her.

Soon after she confesses, she jumps from the moving train and kills herself. Months later, Zia takes the comatose Nadira to the US for advanced treatment hoping that she will recover.

== Cast ==
- Suresh Gopi as DIG Sharafuddeen Tharamasi IPS, head of Railway Anti-Criminal Task Force
- Kavya Madhavan in dual role as:
  - Nadiya Mether (Shooter)
  - Nadira Mether (Dancer)
- Siddique as Usthad Ghulam Musafir "G. M."Loyalist of Janaki Iyer
- Rajan P. Dev as Retired SI Mayilvahanam Kathireshan, Tamil Nadu Police
- Shammi Thilakan as Sudarshan, an investigator and Sharafuddeen's personal assistant
- Joju George as Selvan, an investigator and Sharafuddeen's personal assistant
- Suraj Venjarammoodu as TTR Thathamangalam Muthuraj
- Madhupal as Dr. Ajayghosh
- Suresh Krishna as Vijayabhanu, the Railway Division Manager
- Vijayakumar as Balachandran (Balu) Madhav
- Vandana Menon as Shreya Mariya, NDTV Reporter
- Suja Karthika as Thulasi Mani, a famous classical dancer
- Urmila Unni as Aadilakshmi, principal of Mudrapeetham
- Kollam Thulasi as Madhavan Master, Balu's father
- Anoop Chandran as Sundareshan (Kambili Sundaran), coach attender
- Alexander Prasanth as Dr.Govind
- Bindu Panikkar as Rajamma
- Subair as Alexander Chempadan IPS, Railway SP of Palakkad
- Vijay Menon as Kalpathi Seetharaman, a novelist
- Sajitha Beti as Dr. Mathangi Varma
- Suja Menon as Priya Rose, an actress and daughter of Rajamma
- Deepika Mohan as Balu's mother
- Baburaj as Lakkidi Manikantan, a fake policeman
- Prithviraj Sukumaran as Zia Musafir, Ghulam Muzafir's son (cameo appearance)
- Srividya as Janaki Iyer (Photo presence only)

== Release ==
The movie was released on 27 July 2007. Upon its release, the film received positive reviews from critics and was a box office success. The film ran for 100 days in Thiruvananthapuram and Ernakulam.

The film was remade in Tamil by Shaji Kailas and released in 2017 as Vaigai Express. Nadiya Kollapetta Rathri become established carrier graph of Suresh Gopi

== See also ==
- Elephants Can Remember
- Geethaanjali
- Vaigai Express
