= Jagathy Jagadeesh in Town =

- Directed by: Nissar
- Written by: Titus Maju
- Screenplay by: Titus Maju
- Starring: Jagathy Sreekumar, Jagadish
- Cinematography: C.M Muthu
- Edited by: G.Murali
- Music by: S P Venkitesh
- Release date: 11 January 2002
- Country: India
- Language: Malayalam

Jagathy Jagadeesh in Town is a 2002 Indian Malayalam film, directed by Nissar, starring Jagathy Sreekumar and Jagadish in the lead role, both of them playing dual roles. The comedy flick revolves around pairs of twin brothers born to the same family, with exchanged identities.

== Plot ==
Devaki Amma gave birth to twins twice and Nurse Santha Devi got one among each of them at the time of the deliveries. Rajamma's husband was a thief . They were brought up under his guidance. Devaki Amma's children are brought up in an affluent family that enabled them to become efficient cops in the future, while among the other two kids, one becomes a thief while the other, an artist.

After years, the four of them meet. What happens next forms the rest of the film.

== Cast ==
- Jagathy Sreekumar in a dual role as:
  - CI Balakrishnan
  - Jagatheendran
- Jagadish in a dual role as:
  - SI Unnikrishnan
  - Jagadish Chandran
- Innocent as City Police Commissioner Neelakandan
- Rajan P Dev as Minister Viswanathan
- Charmila as Geetha, Balakrishnan's love interest
- Indrans as Moosa
- Lavanya as Dr. Rasika, Unnikrishnan's love interest
- Mala Aravindan as Bhaskaran
- Ragasudha as Rekha, Viswanathan's daughter
- Kaviyoor Renuka as Devaki Amma, twin pairs mothers (Balakrishnan, Jagathindran, Unnikrishnan, Jagadeesh Chandran mother)
- Santhakumari as Rajamma, nurse
- TP Madhavan as Amar Baba Sett
- Kottayam Nazeer as Govind Sett, Babasett's son
- Harisree Ashokan as Udakku Chembakaraman
- Narayanankutty as Hameed
- Kalabhavan Mani as Malleeswaran, Jagadish Chandran's friend
- Priyanka Anoop as Police Constable Srilatha
