= Butterflies (1993 film) =

1993 film by Rajiv Anchal

- Poster
- Directed by: Rajiv Anchal
- Written by: A. K. Sajan
- Produced by: Menaka
- Starring: Mohanlal; Nassar; Aishwarya; Jagadish
- Cinematography: J. Williams
- Edited by: N. Gopalakrishnan
- Music by: Raveendran; S. P. Venkatesh (Score)
- Production company: Revathy Kalamandhir
- Distributed by: Surya Cini Arts; Sudev Release
- Release date: 9 July 1993
- Country: India
- Language: Malayalam

Butterflies is a 1993 Indian Malayalam-language comedy drama film directed by Rajiv Anchal (in his directorial debut) and written by A. K. Sajan. It was produced by Menaka and was the debut film of their production house Revathy Kalamandhir. The film stars Mohanlal, Aishwarya, Nassar, and Jagadish. The film was extensively shot in Bangalore. The songs were composed by Raveendran Master, while S. P. Venkatesh provided the background score.

The film was a box office hit and Mohanlal's role as Prince became popular in 1993

== Plot ==
Prince is an amateur race car driver and the son of industrialist Bharathan Menon and Sreedevi Menon. He lives a happy-go-lucky life style spending time racing cars, entertaining his nephews in his farm house and hanging out with his friend Vettikkal Sadashivan. He is also involved in fights with the local goons in Bangalore, which lands him in trouble with local police. His brothers Jayan Menon IAS and Dr. Balan Menon, though openly criticize him, come to his aid to release him from the police station. His father disapproves his lifestyle and seeks a suitable alliance for him.

One day, Sadasivan introduces Prince to his relative Pavithran, who seeks help in kidnapping his girlfriend for them to elope. In a comedy of errors, Prince and Sadasivan sedate and kidnap another girl with the same name, Anju. On realizing the mistake the next morning, Prince drops the girl back at her hostel. The ladies' hostel matron does not allow Anju to continue her stay there after her disappearance. Anju returns to Prince's farm house for abode, it becomes difficult for Prince and Sadasivan to handle. Prince's entire family learn that Anju lives on the farm house and they desert Prince.

One morning, Sadasivan and Prince find an obituary in the newspaper with the photo of Anju. They trace the news reporter responsible for the obituary. The news reporter Das and his wife Maya reveal that Anju is the daughter of Colonel Devan Nambiar and that the dead girl was her twin sister, Manju. Two years ago in Ooty, Manju was raped by a few men taking her father as a hostage. After that, she killed herself in front of her father.

Later, Nambiar killed her daughter's rapists and he was sentenced to death by the court. Anju plans to kill herself at the same time her father is executed, but Prince prevents this. Prince gets a mercy petition for Nambiar and his death sentence is reduced to life imprisonment. Anju and Prince confess their love at the end.

== Cast ==
- Mohanlal as Prince
- Jagadish as Vettikkal Sadashivan
- Aishwarya as Anju Nambiar and Manju Nambiar
- Nassar as Colonel Devan Nambiar
- Prem Kumar as Dineshan, Member of Parliament
- N. F. Varghese as Balan Menon
- Ramu as Jayan Menon
- Maniyanpilla Raju as Krishnan Eradi
- Kalpana as Parukkutty
- K. P. Ummer as Bharathan Menon
- Sukumari as Sreedevi Menon
- Nandu as Pavithran
- Rudra as Maya Das
- K. B. Ganesh Kumar as Das
- Mubarak as Pappu

== Production ==
Rajiv Anchal and Mohanlal were supposed to make a film titled Australia. Based on a script by P. Balachandran, it was the story of a car racer who meets an accident and suffers serious burns on one side of his face. Filming began at Sriperumbudur with a Formula One car race sequence featuring Mohanlal that was shot with six cameras. After a week's shoot the project was dropped, reportedly due to budget constraints. However, in a TV show in 2020, Anchal recalled that the film was cancelled due to superstitious reasons when some people persuaded Mohanlal to opt out from the film supposing that the role of a disfigured person may bring jinx, Mohanlal eventually opted out, dropping the film altogether. His character in Australia was inspired by Formula One race driver Niki Lauda.

The car race scenes shot for Australia was later used in the opening titles of Butterflies (in the song "Minnaminni Koodum Thedi"). Principal photography took place in Bangalore, where there was a 60-day long shoot. Aishwarya had worked in Priyadarshan's Gardish, the same crew was working in Butterflies and Aishwarya was also invited for the film. In fact, Aishwarya was keen on working with Mohanlal and was a fan of his work.Some of the challenging shots in action scenes by the late cinematographer J. Williams have received recognition.

== Soundtrack ==
The film has six songs composed by Raveendran. All songs except 'Aha manoranjini' were written by K. Jayakumar. The songs were distributed by the label, Lahari. The film score was composed by S. P. Venkatesh.

Track list

1. "Aaha Manoranjini": M. G. Sreekumar. Lyrics : Raveendran
2. "Minnaminni Koodum Thedi": Unni Menon, K. S. Chithra
3. "Kanyasudha": M. G. Sreekumar, Sujatha Mohan
4. "Pon Thidambu": Mohanlal, Raveendran, Pradeep
5. "Koottinilam Kili": Unni Menon, K. S. Chithra
6. "Paal Nilavile": S. P. Balasubrahmanyam
