= Pilots (film) =

2000 Malayalam drama film

Pilot
- Directed by: Rajiv Anchal
- Screenplay by: Rajiv Anchal; V. R. Gopalakrishnan (Dialogues)
- Story by: Rajiv Anchal
- Produced by: Menaka
- Starring: Suresh Gopi; Praveena; Sreenivasan
- Cinematography: M. J. Radhakrishnan
- Edited by: B. Ajithkumar
- Music by: M. G. Radhakrishnan; Mohan Sithara (Background score)
- Production company: Revathy Kalamandhir
- Distributed by: Kalavirunnu; Shenoys Entertainments
- Release date: 2000
- Country: India
- Language: Malayalam

Pilots is a 2000 Indian Malayalam-language drama film written and directed by Rajiv Anchal and produced by Menaka under Revathy Kalamandhir. The film stars Suresh Gopi, Sreenivasan, and Praveena.

== Plot ==
Bobby comes to high range as a helicopter pilot working for Robinson. His job is to spray copper sulphate (thurisu) in the rubber plantations. He is assisted by Venkidi and other workers. He faced some resistance from local workers like Chacko. He also had to save Robinson from many troubles.

In a nearby convent he sees Sr. Cindrella and was shocked to realise that she is actually Megha Mathew, the sister of his bestfriend, of whose murder Bobby is currently accused of. Megha is the only witness who can prove Bobby's innocence. He fakes a helicopter malfunction and lands the copter in the convent so as to meet Megha in person. But Megha refuses to admit her identity to Bobby. She was not aware that her brother actually gave word to Bobby to give her hand to Bobby. Meanwhile, the murderers of her brother came in search of Megha. Bobby in the end rescues her from the villains and wins Megha.

== Cast ==
- Suresh Gopi as Bobby Nair
- Sreenivasan as Robinson "Robby" Cruso
- Praveena as Sister Cindrella / Megha Mathew
- K. B. Ganesh Kumar as Vinayachandran
- Sukumari as Mother Superior
- Jagathy Sreekumar as Anto
- Janardhanan as Shekharan
- Maniyanpilla Raju as Venkidi
- Tej Sapru as Samar Khan
- Ponnamma Babu as Cicily
- T. P. Madhavan as Fr. Stephen Abraham
- Kanakalatha
- Jyothirmayi as Bobby's Sister
- Indrans as Itty
- Poojappura Ravi as Chandy
- Nandu as Reji
- Valsala Menon
- Bobby Kottarakkara as Dinakaran
- P. Sreekumar as Thomas
- Keerthy Suresh as a church kid (Uncredited Role)

== Soundtrack ==
Track	Song	Singer(s)	Lyricist
1	" Poo Poothu Minni Thennum Yaamam"	K. J. Yesudas, KS Chithra	Gireesh Puthenchery
2	" Navarasa Saarasa Nadanam"	K. J. Yesudas	Gireesh Puthenchery
3	"Doore Pooppambaram"	M. G. Sreekumar	Gireesh Puthenchery
4	"Lilypoovin Naavil Ponnum Thenum"	Sujatha	Samuel Koodal
5	"Lilypoovin Naavil Ponnum Thenum (M)"	MG Sreekumar	Samuel Koodal
6	" Doore Pooppamparam"	Suresh Gopi, Dr Sam	Gireesh Puthenchery
