= Chandra Lakshman =

Indian actress

- Born: Chandra Lakshman; Thiruvananthapuram, Kerala, India
- Other names: Chandra Laxman, Chandra Lekshman
- Occupation: Actress
- Years active: 2002–present
- Spouse: Tosh Christy (m 2021)
- Children: 1

Chandra Lakshman is an Indian actress. She debuted in the 2002 Tamil film Manasellam and has since then appeared in various Malayalam and Tamil films and TV series. She is probably best known for her performances as Sandra Nellikadan, Rini Chandrasekhar, Ganga and Divya in the TV series Swantham, Megham, Kolangal and Kadhalikka Neramillai, respectively.

== Personal life ==
She is married to actor Tosh Christy. She gave birth to a baby boy in October 2022.

== Career ==
Chandra Lakshman was born to Lakshman Kumar and Malathi into a brahmin family in Thiruvananthapuram. Later family shifted to Chennai, where she also did her schooling and graduation. She had her education from J. N School, Chennai, M.G.R Institute of Hotel Management and Madras University. A trained bharatanatyam dancer, she was doing her hotel management training, when director Santhosh saw her and decided to cast her in his film Manasellam.

She made her acting debut with the 2002 Tamil film Manasellam, enacting the sister character of the film's lead actor Srikanth. Her performance in the film made possible her entry into the Malayalam film industry, landing the lead female role in the action thriller Stop Violence (2002) alongside Prithviraj Sukumaran. Subsequently, she starred in a number of supporting roles in Malayalam-language films like Chakram, Balram vs. Taradas and Khaki.

She shot into limelight through her appearances in TV series. She first appeared in the series Swantham, in which she played Sandra Nellikadan, a villainous character, which was highly appreciated by critics and made her a household name. She then starred in series like Devi, enacting a multi-dimensional character, Stree, playing a homely character and Jwalayayi alongside Nedumudi Venu, playing also a villainous character. For her portrayal of Rini Chandrasekhar in Megham, she also received rave reviews and several awards. In Tamil, she rose to fame after her performance as Ganga, again a character with negative shades, in the famous Kolangal-series, in which she starred alongside Devayani. She is also well known for her performance as Divya and Akhila in the popular series Kadhalikka Neramillai and Vasantham, respectively. She has appeared in some advertisements also. She has won several accolades including Asianet Television Awards for best negative role (2005, 2006).

== Filmography ==
Year	Film	Role	Language	Notes
2002	Manasellam	Bala's sister	Tamil	
2002	Stop Violence	Angelina	Malayalam	
2002	April Maadhathil		Tamil	Deleted/Edited scenes
2003	Chakram	Madhuri	Malayalam	
2005	Kalyana Kurimanam	Kasthuri	Malayalam	
2005	Boy Friend	Khader's daughter	Malayalam	Special appearance in the song
2005	Aadhikkam	Priya	Tamil	
2006	Balram vs. Taradas	Shanimol	Malayalam	
2006	Pachakuthira	Film heroine	Malayalam	Guest role
2007	Payum Puli	Moosa Bhai's daughter	Malayalam	
2007	Kaakki	Meenakshi	Malayalam	
2010	Thillalangadi	Shreya Das	Tamil	

== Television ==
TV series

Year	Title	Role	Channel	Language	Notes
2003	Swantham	Sandra Nellikadan	Asianet	Malayalam	Television Debut
2003	Kumkumam		Kairali TV	Malayalam	
2003	Alakal	Ponnambili	DD Malayalam	Malayalam	
2004	Megham	Rini Chandrasekhar	Asianet	Malayalam	
2004	Kadamattathu Kathanar	Kadambari	Asianet	Malayalam	
2005	Devi	Devi	Surya TV	Malayalam	
2006	Unniyarcha	Thumbolarcha	Asianet	Malayalam	
2006	Sthree 2	Sophia	Asianet	Malayalam	
2006	Veendum Jwalayayi	Sona	DD Malayalam	Malayalam	
2006-2007	Kolangal	Ganga	Sun TV	Tamil	
2006-2007	Swantham Suryaputhri	Ganga	Asianet	Malayalam	
2007	Trikarthika			Malayalam	
2007	Jalam		Surya TV	Malayalam	
2007	Swami Ayyappan		Asianet	Malayalam	
2007-2008	Annu Peytha Mazhayil	Gouri	Asianet	Malayalam	
2007-2008	Kadhalikka Neramillai	Divya	Star Vijay	Tamil	
2008-2012	Vasantham	Akhila	Sun TV	Tamil	
2008	Minnal Kesari		Surya TV	Malayalam	
2009	Mazhayariyathe	Meera	Surya TV	Malayalam	
2009-2011	Magal	Shakthi	Sun TV	Tamil	
2010-2011	Poovum Pottum	Uma	Jaya TV	Tamil	
2011-2014	Mamathala Kovela	Shakthi	Gemini TV	Telugu	
2011-2013	Thulasi	Thulasi	Zee Tamil	Tamil	
2012-2013	Sondha Bandham	Shakthi	Sun TV	Tamil	
2014–2016	Pasamalar	Thamarai	Sun TV	Tamil	
2015	Sitakokachilaka	Nithya	MAA TV	Telugu	
2020–2023	Swantham Sujatha	Sujatha	Surya TV	Malayalam	
2021	Manasinakkare	Sujatha	Surya TV	Malayalam	Guest appearance
2022	Bhavana	Sujatha	Surya TV	Malayalam	Cameo appearance in promo
2023-2024	Guppedantha Manasu	Anupama	Star Maa	Telugu	
2024	Kayal	Rajalakshmi	Sun TV	Tamil	
2025	Kolangal 2	Rohini	Sun TV	Tamil	

TV shows

Year	Title	Role	Channel	Language	Notes
2008	Jodi No.1 season 3	Contestant	Sun TV	Tamil	Reality show
2012	Ko Aante Koti	Contestant	Gemini TV	Telugu	Game show
2019	Onnum Onnum Moonu	Guest	Mazhavil Manorama	Malayalam	Chat show
2020	Ruchiyathra	Herself	Surya TV	Malayalam	Christmas special Episode
2021	Anjinodu Injodinju	Promo Anchor	Surya TV	Malayalam	Game show
2021	Onamamankam	Herself	Surya TV	Malayalam	Onam Special show
2021	Aram+Aram =Kinnaram	Mentor	Surya TV	Malayalam	Reality show
2022	Red Carpet	Mentor	Amrita TV	Malayalam	Reality show
2022	Day with a Star	Guest	Kaumudy TV	Malayalam	
2023	Flowers Oru Kodi	Participant	Flowers	Malayalam	Reality show
