= Karunakara Guru =

Founder and spiritual guru of Santhigiri Ashram (1927–1999)

Navajyothi Sree Karunakara Guru
- Born: 1 September 1927; Chandiroor, Alappuzha, Kerala, India
- Died: 6 May 1999 (aged 71); Pothencode, Trivandrum, Kerala, India
- Other name: Navajyothi Sree Karunakara Guru,

Navajyothi Sree Karunakara Guru (1 September 1927 – 6 May 1999), also known as Navajyothi Sree Karunakara Guru, was an Indian spiritual leader and founder of Santhigiri Ashram in Pothencode, Kerala, India.

In 1968, Navajyothi Sree Karunakara Guru founded Santhigiri Ashram in Pothencode, Kerala. The ashram began as a simple retreat but grew into a larger spiritual center. With the guidance of Sufi saint Khureshia Fakir, Guru reported having several visionary experiences, which influenced the development of his teachings and mission. Santhigiri Ashram attracted followers from diverse backgrounds, and many visited Karunakara Guru for spiritual guidance. His presence and teachings led to a growing community that continues to sustain the ashram and its activities.

After reportedly attaining "spiritual completion" in 1973, Karunakara Guru promoted a worship system centered on the concept of Brahman, a universal deity. His teachings encouraged unity across religious lines and promoted spiritual practices open to people of all faiths. He also addressed social and family issues while providing counsel to his followers.

== Early life and education ==
Born on 1 September 1927, Navajyothi Sree Karunakara Guru showed an early interest in spirituality. At 14, he left his family home to join the Advaita Ashram in Aluva, which was associated with the Sivagiri Mutt founded by Narayana Guru. Karunakara Guru spent 17 years at Sivagiri Mutt and its affiliated branches, immersing himself in spiritual studies and practices. In 1957, he departed from Sivagiri and moved to a small hut nearby to pursue an independent spiritual path.

== Legacy and death ==
Karunakara Guru died on 6 May 1999. His legacy is preserved by his followers, who uphold his teachings and conduct annual events to commemorate his life. The ashram has expanded its activities to include social and educational projects.

=== Santhigiri Ashram ===
Santhigiri Ashram, located in Pothencode, near Thiruvananthapuram, serves as a center for spiritual practice and community service. It continues to host events, programs, and ceremonies based on Karunakara Guru's teachings.
