= Stop Violence =

- Film Poster
- Directed by: A. K. Sajan
- Written by: A. K. Santhosh
- Produced by: A. Rajan
- Starring: Prithviraj Sukumaran; Chandra Lakshman; Vijayaraghavan
- Narrated by: A. K. Lohithadas
- Cinematography: Jibu Jacob
- Edited by: Bhoominathan
- Music by: Johnson; Raveendran
- Production company: Vrindavan Pictures
- Distributed by: Vrindavanam Pictures Release
- Release date: October 25, 2002 (India)
- Running time: 111 minutes
- Country: India
- Language: Malayalam

Stop Violence is a 2002 Indian Malayalam-language action film directed by A. K. Sajan. The film stars Prithviraj Sukumaran, Vijayaraghavan, and Chandra Lakshman, in her debut. Stop Violence was the second released film of Prithviraj, though made after Nandanam, which was released two months after its release. The movie performed well at the box office, largely drawing youth audience to the theatre. The movie is considered as Prithviraj's notable performance in his early movies. The sequel to the film, Asuravithu, starring Asif Ali, was released on 6 January 2012.

== Plot ==
Stephen is the circle inspector in charge of the anti-goonda squad, but he himself is a gangster who rules over the city with his henchmen Acid and Sathan. Angelina, a nun who was raped and became pregnant, is fighting a legal battle with help from Pauly Anthony advocate and her friend Ambili to get back into the convent she was expelled from. Stephen's rival Kishanbhai's gang is hired by Anthony, Pauly's husband, to silence and defame Angelina to avoid a controversy. Pauly hires Sathan's gang to protect Angelina. This results in escalation of rivalry between both gangs. Sathan cuts up Kishanbhai but kishan's henchman rapes Ambili in retaliation.

Ambili agrees to become Stephen's mistress in return for protection from Kishanbhai's gang. Stephen sends Sathan to become Angelina's bodyguard until the things blow over. Stephen and Acid beats up Kishanbhai and rapes his wife and make a video of the crime to keep him silent. But Kishanbhai's wife commits suicide and in anger his men kills Acid and tries to kill Sathan. Sathan escapes and kill one of Kishanbhai's men but they manage to attack and nearly kill Stephen and Ambili. Sathan kills one of the main members of Kishanlal's gang, but Stephen is dissatisfied by the slow progress after knowing that he has gone soft and have developed feeling for Angelina. Sathan finally manages to kill kishanlal. Stephen shares the news with Ambili during this Stephen reveals to her that it was Sathan who raped Angelina. New CI Shekharan who took charge of goonda squad cracks down on Stephen's gang Stephen snatches him to be killed, but Sathan helps him to escape after remembering things Angelina had told him previously. And when Stephen is suspended from the department because of this, his anger towards Sathan tenfolds and beats him up and kick him out of the gang while not killing him to know where Angelina is. Sathan meets Angelina at the church, where she is hiding. There Sathan reveals that it was he who raped her. After the revelation, they leave the church. Stephen and the police chase and arrest Sathan. Stephen plans to kill Saathan by beating him up and throwing him on the railway tracks. But Sathan gathers last of his strength and grabs Stephen's leg, and the train crushes them both to death. Angelina escapes dressing up as a Nun and is later seen raising Sathan's son.

All through the story's narrative, we hear the voice of the director A. K. Lohithadas as the narrator, by the end of the film, we know that Lohithadas was actually researching for a new movie script, when we finally see Angelina as a single mother to a son fathered by Saathan. The movie closes with a street side poster of Lohithadas's new movie, which is based on Saathan's life.

== Cast ==
- Prithviraj Sukumaran as Saathan aka Daveed (as revealed in sequel, Asuravithu)
- Vijayaraghavan as C.I Gunda Stephen
- Chandra Lakshman as Angelina
- Thara Kalyan as Adv. Pauly Anthony
- Sadiq as C.I Shekharan
- Saji Soman as Acid
- Madhupal as Antony
- A. K. Lohithadas as Himself
- Vinayakan as Montha
- Ambika Mohan

== Controversy ==
The film was initially titled Violence. However, due to objection raised by the censor board, the title was changed to Stop Violence. The censors asked for at least 10 cuts because they felt it showed women in a bad light and that too much blood is being spilt on the screen. They decided not to challenge the cuts and also agreed for a change in title.

== Reception ==
A critic from Cinesouth wrote that "The film should definiltely recover its costs. Performances of the lead actors have been very good and convincing. The director should probably succeed in holding the audience's attention". On the contrary, a critic from Sify wrote that "If you like blood and gore, try out Stop Violence. Even after the censors have butchered the film there is enough of the cliché-ridden feuding blood thirsty gangsters and their molls who run amuck in every frame. The director A. K. Santhosh does not effectively communicate the rage and shame of the Kochi underworld".
