= Santhigiri =

Hindu ashram

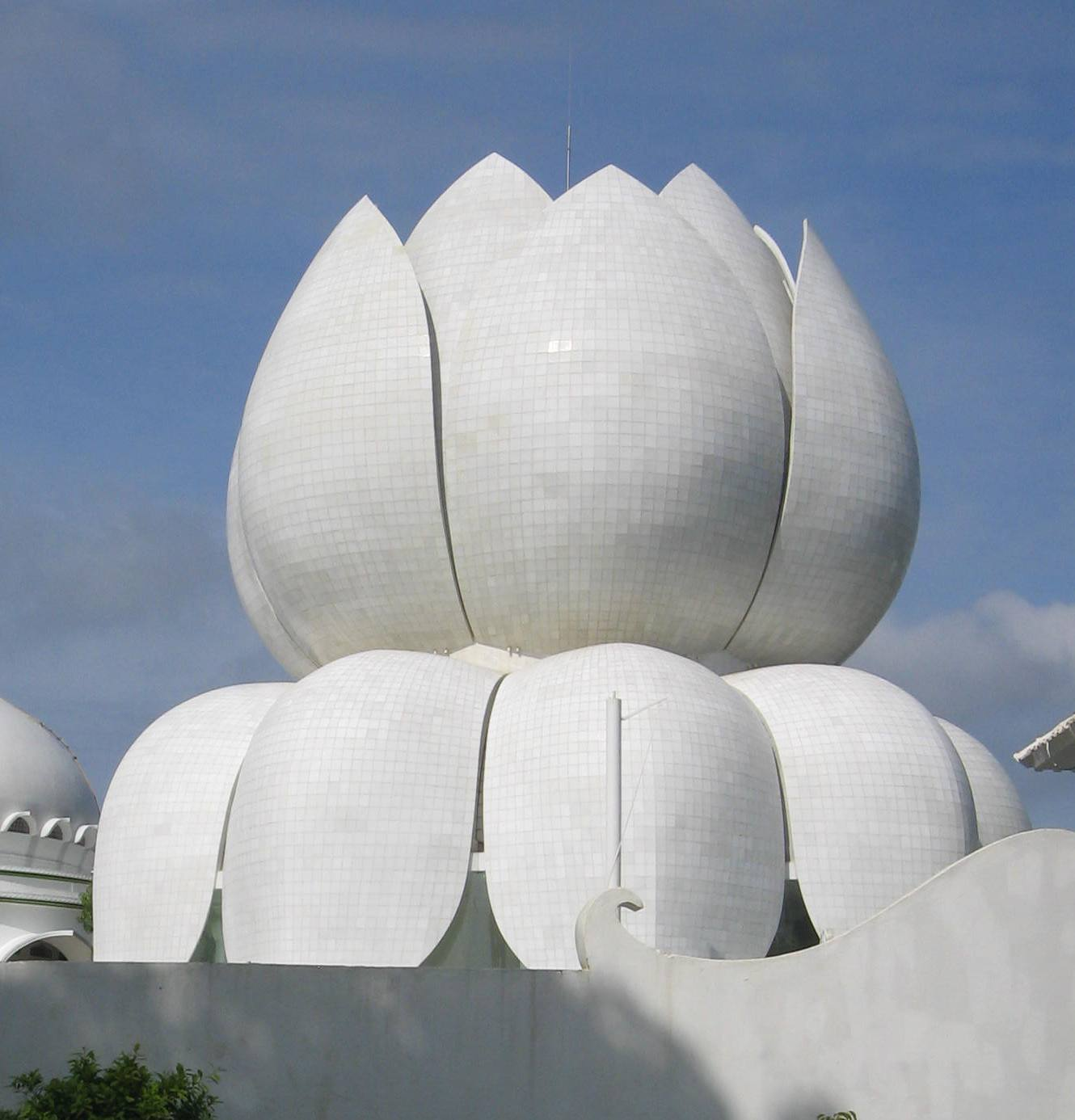

Santhigiri Ashram is a spiritual center and pilgrimage site, located in Pothencode, Thiruvananthapuram District, Kerala, India. It was founded by Navajyothi Sree Karunakara Guru and is recognized and developed as a Social and Scientific Research Organization by the Government of India.

Situated within the ashram compound is the Parnasala monument, in the shape of a lotus blossom in white Makrana marble. It was constructed by the followers of Karunakara Guru over a period of 10 years. It was inaugurated by the President of India Pratibha Devi Patil on 13 August, 2010 and was opened for prayers and worship on 12 September, 2010.

This ashram is located at the geographic coordinates of 8°37′55.6″N 76°53′52.8″E at an altitude of about 107.06 m above sea level.

Santhigiri Ashram works towards fulfilling Navajyothi Sri Karunakara Guru's vision of "revitalized life involving spiritual, social, economic and cultural elements".

== Activities ==
=== Offering free food ===
One of Guru's objectives was to feed the poor and to this end the ashram offers an Annadanam, or gift of food, at their various centers, to all the visitors as well as inmates. On the aspects of Guru's wish all human beings in one society truly followed.

=== Healthcare ===
Athurasevanam or care of the ailing is a supporting function to the Guru's vision. The ashram performs this function through a chain of Ayurveda and Siddha research centers, hospitals, onsite and offsite health care programs and camps and social research.

=== Athmabodhanam ===
Part of the Guru's vision for the ashram is Athmabodhanam or spiritual awakening. The awakening is at two levels - rational and transcendental; the former focuses on elimination of ignorance while the latter focuses on knowledge of reality.

=== Economic development ===
As part of the vision of a revitalized life, the ashram focuses on economic development, with an emphasis on trade skills and support for women and cottage industry programs.
