= List of Malayalam films of 2018 =

The tables list the Malayalam films released in theaters in the year 2018. Premiere shows and film festival screenings are not considered as releases for this list.

== Released films ==
Opening		Title	Director	Cast	Genre	Ref
J A N U A R Y	5	Diwanjimoola Grand Prix	Anil Radhakrishnan Menon	Kunchacko Boban, Nyla Usha, Nedumudi Venu, Siddique, Vinayakan	Sports, Thriller	
J A N U A R Y	5	Eeda	B. Ajithkumar	Shane Nigam, Nimisha Sajayan, Surabhi Lakshmi, Sudhi Koppa	Political, Romance	
J A N U A R Y	5	Sakhavinte Priyasakhi	Siddique Thamarasserry	Sudheer Karamana, Neha Saxena, Salim Kumar, Shine Tom Chacko	Political, Thriller	
J A N U A R Y	12	Daivame Kaithozham K. Kumar Akanam	Salim Kumar	Jayaram, Anusree, Sreenivasan, Salim Kumar, Prayaga Martin, Nedumudi Venu	Comedy	
J A N U A R Y	12	Puzha (2018 film)	Cochin Sitara	Santhosh Keezhattoor, Vinod Prabhakar, Vaisakha, Sivaji Guruvayoor, Lishoy	Drama	
J A N U A R Y	12	Queen	Dijo Jose Antony	Saniya Iyappan, Dhruvan, Aswin Jose	Comedy, Drama	
J A N U A R Y	19	Carbon	Venu	Fahadh Faasil, Mamta Mohandas, Dileesh Pothan, Soubin Shahir, Nedumudi Venu	Survival, Adventure	
J A N U A R Y	20	Shikkari Shambhu	Sugeeth	Kunchacko Boban, Sshivada, Vishnu Unnikrishnan, Hareesh Kanaran, Krishna Kumar	Comedy, Thriller	
J A N U A R Y	26	Aadhi	Jeethu Joseph	Pranav Mohanlal, Siddique, Lena, Anusree, Jagapati Babu	Action, Thriller	
J A N U A R Y	26	Street Lights	Shamdat Sainudeen	Mammootty, Lijomol Jose, Gayathri Krishnaa, Joy Mathew, Hareesh Kanaran, Rajendran	Drama, Thriller	
F E B R U A R Y	2	Hey Jude	Shyamaprasad	Nivin Pauly, Trisha Krishnan, Neena Kurup, Vijay Menon, Suraj Venjaramoodu, Siddique	Drama	
F E B R U A R Y	9	Aami	Kamal	Manju Warrier, Tovino Thomas, Murali Gopy, Anoop Menon, KPAC Lalitha	Biography, Drama	
F E B R U A R Y	9	Kadha Paranja Kadha	Siju Jawahar	Siddharth Menon, Tharushi, Praveena, Shaheen Siddique, Renji Panicker, Dileesh Pothan	Drama	
F E B R U A R Y	9	Kaly	Najeem Koya	Shebin Benson, Joju George, Anil K Reji, Vidhya Vijay, Aishwarya Suresh	Drama	
F E B R U A R Y	9	Rosapoo	Vinu Joseph	Biju Menon, Anjali, Neeraj Madhav, Dileesh Pothan, Soubin Shahir	Drama	
F E B R U A R Y	16	Angararajyathe Jimmanmar	Praveen Narayanan	Rajeev Pillai, Anu Mohan, Vinitha Koshy, Roopesh Peethambaran, Sudev Nair	Romantic drama	
F E B R U A R Y	16	Captain	Prajesh Sen	Jayasurya, Anu Sithara, Renji Panicker, Siddique	Biographical/ Sports drama	
F E B R U A R Y	16	Kallai FM	Vineesh Milleniium	Sreenivasan, Parvathy Ratheesh, Sreenath Bhasi, Kalabhavan Shajon	Drama	
F E B R U A R Y	16	Kunju Daivam	Jeo Baby	Adish Praveen, Joju George, Reina Maria, Sidhartha Siva	Drama	
F E B R U A R Y	16	Nimisham	P. R. Suresh	Riyaz Khan, Neena Kurup, Sadiq	Drama	
F E B R U A R Y	23	Bonsai	Santhosh Peringeth	Manoj K. Jayan, Lena, Santhosh Keezhattoor	Drama	
F E B R U A R Y	23	Janaki	M. G. Sasi	Sreejith Ravi, Vinay Forrt, Prakash Bare	Drama	
F E B R U A R Y	23	Kala Viplavam Pranayam	Jithin Jithu	Anson Paul, Gayathri Suresh, Saiju Kurup, Niranjana Anoop	Romance, Drama	
F E B R U A R Y	23	Kalyanam	Rajesh Nair	Shravan Mukesh, Sreenivasan, Varsha Bollamma, Mukesh	Romance, Comedy	
F E B R U A R Y	23	Kinar	M. A. Nishad	Jayapradha, Revathi, Pasupathy, Joy Mathew, Renji Panicker	Drama	
F E B R U A R Y	23	Moonnam Niyamam	Vijeesh Vasudev	Riyaz Khan, Sanoop Soman, Rajani Murali, Kaviraj, Monil Gopinath, Sujatha	Drama	
F E B R U A R Y	23	Pathirakalam	Priyanandanan	Mythili, Indrans	Crime, Drama	
MARCH	9	Charminar	Ajith C. Lokesh	Ashwin Kkumar, Harshika Poonacha, Sirajuddeen, Hemanth Menon	Drama	
MARCH	9	Mattancherry	Jayesh Mynakapilly	I. M. Vijayan, Kottayam Nazeer, Jubin Raj Dev, Gopika Anil, Lal, Amjad Moosa, Kalesh Kannattu	Drama	
MARCH	9	Aaranu Njan	P.R.Unnikrishnan	Jayachandran Thagazhikaran, Muhammed Nilamboor	Drama	
MARCH	15	Poomaram	Abrid Shine	Kalidas Jayaram, Neeta Pillai, Kunchacko Boban, Meera Jasmine	Drama	
MARCH	16	Ira	Saiju SS	Unni Mukundan, Gokul Suresh, Niranjana Anoop	Crime, Thriller	
MARCH	16	Shadow	Raj Gokuldas	Manoj Panicker, Anil Murali, Tosh Christy, Sneha Rose John	Horror	
MARCH	16	Shirk	Manu Krishna	Aditi Rai, Jagadish, Indrans	Drama	
MARCH	23	Lolans	Salim Baba	Nishan, Sunil Sukhada, Indrans, Karoline	Comedy, drama	
MARCH	23	S Durga	Sanal Kumar Sasidharan	Rajshri Deshpande, Kannan Nayar, Bilas Nair, Arun Sol, Sujish, Vedh	Fantasy, drama	
MARCH	23	Sudani from Nigeria	Zakariya	Soubin Shahir, Samuel Abiola Robinson, Aneesh Menon	Family, Sports, Drama	
MARCH	29	Kuttanadan Marpappa	Sreejith Vijayan	Kunchacko Boban, Aditi Ravi, Innocent, Shanthi Krishna, Salim Kumar	Comedy, Drama	
MARCH	29	Vikadakumaran	Boban Samuel	Vishnu Unnikrishnan, Manasa Radhakrishnan, Dharmajan Bolgatty	Comedy, Thriller	
MARCH	31	Swathanthryam Ardharathriyil	Tinu Pappachan	Antony Varghese, Chemban Vinod Jose, Vinayakan	Action, Thriller	
A P R I L	6	Aalorukkam	V. C. Abhilash	Indrans, Sreekanth Menon, Vishnu Agasthya, Seetha Bala	Drama	
A P R I L	6	Orayiram Kinakkalal	Pramod Mohan	Biju Menon, Sakshi Agarwal, Sharu Varghese, Kalabhavan Shajon	Comedy, Thriller	
A P R I L	6	Parole	Sharrath Sandith	Mammootty, Iniya, Miya George, Siddique, Suraj Venjaramoodu	Drama	
A P R I L	13	Mercury	Karthik Subbaraj	Prabhu Deva, Remya Nambeesan, Sananth Reddy, Shashank Purushottam	Thriller	
A P R I L	14	Panchavarnathatha	Ramesh Pisharody	Kunchacko Boban, Jayaram, Anusree, Salim Kumar	Comedy, Family, Drama	
A P R I L	14	Kammara Sambhavam	Rathish Ambat	Dileep, Siddharth Narayan, Shraddha Srinath, Bobby Simha, Namitha Pramod, Murali Gopy	Action, Drama	
A P R I L	14	Mohanlal	Sajid Yahiya	Manju Warrier, Indrajith Sukumaran, Aju Varghese, Salim Kumar	Fanism, Comedy	
A P R I L	20	Arakkirukkan	Sunil Viswachaithanya	Rajesh Gurukkal, Franco Vithayathil, K.K Ambramoli, Sobhindran Master, Mirsha Mubarak, Vibin vijay	Drama	
A P R I L	20	Moonnara	Sooraj S Kurup	Hareesh Peradi, Krishnakumar, Ambika Mohan	Thriller	
A P R I L	20	Suvarna Purushan	Sunil Puveily	Innocent, Lena, Sreejith Ravi, Bijukuttan	Fanism, Comedy	
A P R I L	26	Thobama	Mohsin Kassim	Krishna Shankar, Siju Wilson, Sharaf U Dheen, Shabareesh Varma	Comedy drama	
A P R I L	27	Aravindante Athidhikal	M. Mohanan	Vineeth Sreenivasan, Nikhila Vimal, Sreenivasan, Urvashi, Shanthi Krishna	Family, Drama	
A P R I L	27	Uncle	Gireesh Damodar	Mammootty, Karthika Muralidharan, Joy Mathew, KPAC Lalitha	Thriller, Drama	
M A Y	3	Chanakya Thanthram	Kannan Thamarakulam	Unni Mukundan, Sshivada, Anoop Menon, Ramesh Pisharody, Hareesh Kanaran, Vinaya Prasad	Romantic Thriller	
M A Y	4	Aabhaasam	Jubith Namradath	Rima Kallingal, Suraj Venjaramoodu, Mammukoya, Indrans, Nassar, Alencier Ley Lopez	Comedy drama	
M A Y	4	Ee.Ma.Yau	Lijo Jose Pellissery	Chemban Vinod Jose, Vinayakan, Dileesh Pothan, Pauly Valsan, Krishna Padmakumar	Drama	
M A Y	5	B.Tech	Mridul Nair	Asif Ali, Anoop Menon, Aparna Balamurali, Harish Raj, Sreenath Bhasi, Sandeep Menon	Comedy drama	
M A Y	11	Kamuki	Binu. S	Askar Ali, Aparna Balamurali	Romance	
M A Y	11	Kuttanpillayude Sivarathri	Jean Markose	Suraj Venjaramoodu, Srinda Arhaan, Mithun Ramesh, Biju Sopanam	Comedy drama	
M A Y	11	Naam	Joshy Thomas Pallickal	Shabareesh Varma, Tovino Thomas, Gayathri Suresh, Rahul Madhav, Aditi Ravi, Renji Panicker	Comedy drama	
M A Y	11	Premasoothram	Jiju Asokan	Chemban Vinod Jose, Balu Varghese, Dharmajan Bolgatty, Indrans, Sudheer Karamana, Lijomol Jose	Comedy drama	
M A Y	18	Krishnam	Dinesh Baboo	Akshay Krishnan, Ashwaria Ullas, Shanthi Krishna, Sai Kumar, Renji Panicker, Mamitha Baiju	Romantic drama	
M A Y	18	Sthaanam	Sivaprasad	Vinu Mohan, Madhu	Romance, drama	
M A Y	18	School Diary	M. Hajamoinu	Bhama Arun, Mamitha Baiju, Anagha S. Nair, Diyaa, Vismaya Viswanathan, Hashim Hissain	Romantic drama	
M A Y	25	Angane Njanum Premichu	Rajeev Varghese	Vishnu Nambiar, Jeevan Gopal, Suryakanth Udayakumar, Siddique, Jeeva Joseph, Neena Kurup	Comedy drama	
M A Y	25	Kaithola Chathan	Sumeesh Ramakrishnan	Levin Simon Joseph, Thesni Khan, Kalabhavan Shajon, Mammukoya	Comedy drama	
M A Y	25	Mazhayathu	Suveeran	Aparna Gopinath, Nikesh Ram, Manoj K. Jayan, Nandana Varma, Shanthi Krishna	Drama	
M A Y	25	Paikutty	Nandhu Varavoor	Pradeep Nalanda	Drama	
J U N E	1	Dustbin	Madhu Thattampally	Madhu, Sudheer Karamana, Kulappulli Leela	Drama	
J U N E	1	Orange Valley	RK DreamWest	Bibin Mathai, Dhiphul MR, Vandhitha Manoharan, Baiju Bala, Neetu Chandran	Drama	
J U N E	1	Marubhoomiyile Mazhathullikal	Anil Karrakulam	Chembil Asokan, Sarayu	Drama	
J U N E	1	Urukku Satheeshan	Santhosh Pandit	Santhosh Pandit	Drama	
J U N E	1	Velakkariyayirunnalum Neeyen Mohavalli	Govind Varaha	Rahul Madhav, Neena Kurup, Madhu, Alexander Prasanth, Disney James	Romance	
J U N E	1	Premanjaly	Suresh Narayanan	Shweta Menon, Devan, Babu Namboothiri, Geetha Vijayan, Bhagyalakshmi	Drama	
J U N E	8	Sreehalli	Sachin Raj	Santhosh Keezhatoor, Unni Lalu, Greeshma, Bichal Muhammed	Drama	
J U N E	15	Aashiq Vanna Divasam	Krish Kymal	Priyamani, Nasser Latif	Drama	
J U N E	15	Njan Marykutty	Ranjith Sankar	Jayasurya, Aju Varghese, Jewel Mary, Suraj Venjaramoodu, Innocent	Drama	
J U N E	15	Muthalaq	Vijaya Kumar	Muhammed Sudheer, Rashid Ponnani	Drama	
J U N E	16	Abrahaminte Santhathikal	Shaji Padoor	Mammootty, Kanika, Tharushi, Anson Paul	Drama, Thriller	
J U N E	22	Police Junior	Sunil Sukhada	Narain, Kanakalatha Pillai, Shanavaz Prem Nazir	Drama	
J U N E	29	Kidu	Majeed Abu	Ramzan Muhammed, Minon John	Drama	
J U N E	29	Onnumariyathe	Sajeev Vyasa	Madhurima, Ansar	Drama	
J U N E	29	Pettilambattra	Syam Lenin	Levin Simon, Rony Raj, Indrans	Drama	
J U N E	29	Kenalum Kinarum	Mummy Century	Tini Tom, Jaffer Idukki	Drama	
J U N E	29	Swargakkunnile Kuriakose	Emmanuvel	Rajeesh Puttad	Drama	
J U N E	29	Yours Lovingly	Biju J Kattakkal	Alby, Amy	Drama	
J U L Y	6	Cuban Colony	Manoj Varghese Parecattil	Manoj Varghese Parecattil, sreeraj vikram, able benny, Sreekanth, gokul, jhino jhon, Zhinz Shan	Gangster thriller	
J U L Y	6	My Story	Roshni Dinaker	Prithviraj Sukumaran, Parvathy, Ganesh Venkatraman, Roger Narayan, Manoj K. Jayan	Romance	
J U L Y	6	Theetta Rappai	Vinu Ramakrishnan	RLV Ramakrishnan, Sonia Agarwal, Sasi Kalinga, KPAC Lalitha	Biography, Drama	
J U L Y	13	Neerali	Ajoy Verma	Mohanlal, Suraj Venjaramoodu, Nadiya Moidu, Parvathy Nair, Nassar	Survival, Thriller	
J U L Y	14	Koode	Anjali Menon	Prithviraj Sukumaran, Parvathy, Nazriya Nazim, Ranjith Balakrishnan, Roshan Mathew	Romantic, Drama	
J U L Y	20	Bhayanakam	Jayaraj	Renji Panicker, Asha Sarath, Sabitha Jayaraj	Drama	
J U L Y	20	Oru Pazhaya Bomb Kadha	Shafi	Bibin George, Vishnu Unnikrishnan, Prayaga Martin, Harisree Asokan, Vijayaraghavan, Indrans	Drama	
J U L Y	20	Savaari	Ashok Nair	Suraj Venjaramoodu, Jayaraj Warrier, Sunil Sukhada, Praveena, Shivaji Guruvayoor	Drama	
J U L Y	27	Ennalum Sarath..?	Balachandra Menon	Balachandra Menon, Nithya Naresh, Surabhi Lakshmi, Mallika Sukumaran	Suspense thriller	
J U L Y	27	Ente Mezhuthiri Athazhangal	Sooraj Thomas	Anoop Menon, Miya George, Lal Jose, Dileesh Pothan	Drama	
J U L Y	27	Kinavalli	Sugeeth	Krrish, Ajmal Zayn, Surabhi Santhosh, Hareesh Kanaran	Drama	
J U L Y	27	Maradona	Vishu Narayan	Tovino Thomas, Sharanya Nair, Leona Lishoy, Chemban Vinod Jose	Drama	
J U L Y	27	Theekuchiyum Panithulliyum	Mithran Naufaldeen	Krishna Kumar, Kani Kusruti, Bineesh Bastin, Neena Kurup	Drama	
A U G U S T	3	Chandragiri	Mohan Kuplari	Lal, Hareesh Peradi, Sajitha Madathil, Joy Mathew	Drama	
A U G U S T	3	Devasparsham	V R Gopinath	Nedumudi Venu, Manu G Nath, Anupama Pournami	Drama	
A U G U S T	3	Iblis	Rohith V. S.	Asif Ali, Madonna Sebastian, Siddique, Sreenath Bhasi, Lal	Romantic comedy	
A U G U S T	11	Neeli	Althaf Rahman	Anoop Menon, Mamta Mohandas	Comedy, Horror	
A U G U S T	24	Laughing Apartment Near Girinagar	Nissar	Ramesh Pisharody, Anjana Appukuttan	Comedy	
S E P T E M B E R	6	Ranam	Nirmal Sahadev	Prithviraj Sukumaran, Rahman, Isha Talwar	Action, Crime, Drama	
S E P T E M B E R	7	Theevandi	Fellini T. P.	Tovino Thomas, Samyuktha Menon, Suraaj Venjarammoodu, Surabhi Lakshmi	Comedy	
S E P T E M B E R	14	Padayottam	Rafeek Ibrahim	Biju Menon, Ravi Singh, Dileesh Pothan, Saiju Kurup, Hareesh Kanaran, Anu Sithara	Comedy, Crime	
S E P T E M B E R	14	Oru Kuttanadan Blog	Sethu	Mammootty, Anu Sithara, Siddique, Suraj Venjaramoodu, Raai Laxmi	Drama	
S E P T E M B E R	20	Mangalyam Thanthunanena	Soumya Sadanandan	Kunchacko Boban, Nimisha Sajayan, Soubin Shahir, Hareesh Perumanna, Salim Kumar, Vijayaraghavan	Comedy, Romance	
S E P T E M B E R	20	Varathan	Amal Neerad	Fahadh Faasil, Aishwarya Lekshmi, Sharafudheen, Arjun Ashokan, Mamitha Baiju	Drama, Thriller	
S E P T E M B E R	28	Chalakkudikkaran Changathi	Vinayan	Rajamani, Salim Kumar, Dharmajan Bolgatty, Honey Rose, Ramesh Pisharody, Joju George	Biographical drama	
S E P T E M B E R	28	Lilly	Prasobh Vijayan	Samyuktha Menon, Dhanesh Anand, Aaryan Krishna Menon, Kannan Nayar, Kevin Jose	Thriller	
O C T O B E R	5	Aickarakkonathe Bhishaguaranmaar	Biju Majeed	Vipin Mangalassery, Samarth Ambujakshan, Sinseer, Shivaji Guruvayoor, Lalu Alex, Seema G. Nair, Sunil Sukhada	Drama	
O C T O B E R	5	Mandharam	Vijesh Vijay	Asif Ali, Anarkali Marikar, Arjun Nandakumar, Indrans, Jacob Gregory	Romantic drama	
O C T O B E R	5	Wonder Boys	Sreekanth S. Nair	Bala, Kulappulli Leela	Action drama	
O C T O B E R	11	Kayamkulam Kochunni	Rosshan Andrrews	Nivin Pauly, Mohanlal, Priya Anand, Sunny Wayne, Shine Tom Chacko	Period drama	
O C T O B E R	11	Shabdam	P. K. Sreekumar	Rubi Thomas, Nimisha	Drama	
O C T O B E R	12	Nonsense	M. C. Jithin	Rinosh, Shruti Ramachandran, Vinay Forrt, Kalabhavan Shajon	Comedy drama	
O C T O B E R	18	Aanakkallan	Suresh Divakar	Biju Menon, Anusree, Shamna Kasim, Siddique	Comedy drama	
O C T O B E R	18	Dakini	Rahul Riji Nair	Aju Varghese, Sethu Lakshmi, Saiju Kurup, Chemban Vinod Jose, Suraj Venjaramoodu, Mamitha Baiju	Comedy drama	
O C T O B E R	26	French Viplavam	Maju	Sunny Wayne, Lal, Chemban Vinod Jose	Comedy drama	
O C T O B E R	26	Johny Johny Yes Appa	Marthandan	Kunchacko Boban, Anu Sithara	Comedy drama	
O C T O B E R	26	Koodasha	Dinu Thomas Eelan	Baburaj, Sai Kumar, Aaryan Krishna Menon	Drama	
O C T O B E R	26	Who	Ajay Devaloka	Shine Tom Chacko, Shruthy Menon, Pearle Maaney, Rajeev Pillai	Fantasy Thriller	
N O V E M B E R	1	Drama	Ranjith	Mohanlal, Asha Sarath, Kaniha, Arundhati Nag, Shyamaprasad, Jewel Mary	Comedy drama	
N O V E M B E R	2	Thanaha	Prakash Kunjhan Moorayil	Abhilash Nandakumar, Tito Wilson, Anjali Nair, Hareesh Kanaran, Sreejith Ravi	Drama	
N O V E M B E R	2	Kaattu Vithachavar	Satheesh Paul	Tini Tom, Prakash Bare, Babu Annoor	Drama	
N O V E M B E R	9	Oru Kuprasidha Payyan	Madhupal	Tovino Thomas, Nimisha Sajayan, Anu Sithara, Dileesh Pothan, Sujith Shankar, Siddique	Thriller	
N O V E M B E R	9	Vallikudilile Vellakkaran	Douglas Alfred	Ganapathi, Tanuja Karthik, Lal, Muthumani, Balu Varghese, Aju Varghese,	Comedy drama	
N O V E M B E R	16	Joseph	M. Padmakumar	Joju George, Athmiya Rajan, Malavika Menon, Dileesh Pothan, Irshad, Sudhi Koppa	Thriller drama	
N O V E M B E R	16	Ladoo	Arun George K. David	Vinay Forrt, Balu Varghese, Shabareesh Varma, Dileesh Pothan, Bobby Simha, Gayathri Ashok	Romantic drama	
N O V E M B E R	16	Mottitta Mullakal	Vinodh Kannol	Arun Jenson, Vasudev, Jaimi Afsal, Joy Mathew, Deepika Mohan	Drama	
N O V E M B E R	16	Nithyaharitha Nayakan	A. R. Binuraj	Vishnu Unnikrishnan, Manju Pillai, Anju Aravind, Raveena Ravi, Indrans, Dharmajan Bolgatty	Comedy	
N O V E M B E R	23	Autorsha	Sujith Vaassudev	Anusree, Rahul Madhav, Tini tom		
N O V E M B E R	23	369	Jefin Joy	Hemanth Menon		
N O V E M B E R	23	Ottakoru Kaamukan	Jayan Vannery	Joju George, Shine Tom Chacko, Arundhati Nair, Abhirami, Lijomol Jose, Shalu Rahim	Romantic drama	
N O V E M B E R	23	Contessa	Sudip E S	Appani Sarath, Sreejith Ravi		
N O V E M B E R	23	Papas	Sambath Sam	Rashid Patharakkal, Liji Jyothis		
N O V E M B E R	23	Pen Masala	Suneesh Neendoor	Arun Raj, Aparna Nair		
N O V E M B E R	23	Samaksham	Aju K	Kailash, Gayatri Krishnaa, Anaswara Rajan		
N O V E M B E R	23	Ippozhum Eppozhum Sthuthiyayirikatte	Rajeev Balakrishnan	Devan, Ambika Mohan		
N O V E M B E R	30	Avarkkoppam	Ganesh Nair	Joji Varghese, Ezhil Queen, Kochunni Elavanmadom, Amith Pullarakatt, Nishad Joy, Tina Nair, Parthasaradhy Pillai	Drama	
N O V E M B E R	30	Dhan	Maya Shiva	Shiva Nair, Adhithya Dev, Baby Krishna	Drama	
N O V E M B E R	30	Nervarennu Immani Cherinjoo.. Taa..	Mani Madhav	Sudhi Koppa, Kalabhavan Shajon, Jaffer Idukki, Pratheeksha	Romantic drama	
D E C E M B E R	6	Karinkannan	Pappan Narippatta	Saju Navodaya, Seema G. Nair, Salim Kumar, Indrans, Hareesh Kanaran	Drama	
D E C E M B E R	6	Paviettante Madhurachooral	Sreekrishnan	Sreenivasan, Lena, Vinu Mohan, Shebin Benson, Vijayaraghavan	Drama	
D E C E M B E R	7	Madhuramee Yathra	Satheesh Guruvayoor	Maanav, Rajani Murali, Shivaji Guruvayoor, Krishna Prasad	Drama	
D E C E M B E R	7	Kharam	PV Jose	Santhosh Kezhator	Drama	
D E C E M B E R	7	Ka Bodyscapes	Jayan K. Cheriyan	Jason Chacko, Rajesh Kannan, Deepa Vasudevan	Romance	
D E C E M B E R	14	Odiyan	V. A. Shrikumar Menon	Mohanlal, Manju Warrier, Narain, Prakash Raj, Manoj Joshi, Innocent, Siddique	Fantasy thriller	
D E C E M B E R	21	Ente Ummante Peru	Jose Sebastian	Tovino Thomas, Urvashi, Hareesh Kanaran, Mammukoya	Drama	
D E C E M B E R	21	Njan Prakashan	Sathyan Anthikad	Fahadh Faasil, Nikhila Vimal, Sreenivasan, KPAC Lalitha, Aneesh Menon	Comedy drama	
D E C E M B E R	21	Pretham 2	Ranjith Sankar	Jayasurya, Durga Krishnan, Saniya Iyappan, Dain Davis	Comedy horror	
D E C E M B E R	22	Thattumpurath Achuthan	Lal Jose	Kunchacko Boban, Sravana, Hareesh Kanaran, Nedumudi Venu, Kalabhavan Shajon	Comedy drama	

== Dubbed films ==
Movies dubbed into Malayalam
Opening	Title	Director(s)	Original film		Cast	Ref.
Opening	Title	Director(s)	Film	Language	Cast	Ref.
26 January	Bhaagamathie	G. Ashok	Bhaagamathie	Telugu / Tamil	Anushka, Unni Mukundan, Jayaram	
20 April	Njan Gagan	Boyapati Srinu	Jaya Janaki Nayaka	Telugu	Bellamkonda Sreenivas, Rakul Preet Singh, Jagapathi Babu	
9 May	Mahanati	Nag Ashwin	Mahanati	Telugu	Keerthy Suresh, Dulquer Salmaan, Vijay Devarakonda, Samantha Akkineni	
4 May	Ente Peru Surya Ente Veedu India	Vakkantham Vamsi	Naa Peru Surya	Telugu	Allu Arjun, Anu Emmanuel, R. Sarath Kumar, Arjun, Boman Irani	
4 May	Mukhyan	Shaji Kailas	En Vazhi Thani Vazhi	Tamil	RK	
25 May	Abhiyude Kadha Anuvinteyum	B. R. Vijayalakshmi	Abhiyum Anuvum	Tamil	Tovino Thomas, Piaa Bajpai, Suhasini Maniratnam, Prabhu, Rohini	
31 May	Bharath Enna Njan	Koratala Siva	Bharat Ane Nenu	Telugu	Mahesh Babu, Kiara Advani, R. Sarathkumar, Prakash Raj	
21 December	KGF	Prashanth Neel	K.G.F: Chapter 1	Kannada	Yash, Srinidhi Shetty, Ananth Nag, Achyuth Kumar, Malavika Avinash	

== Notable deaths ==
Celebrity deaths that occurred during the year
Month	Date	Name	Age	Profession	Notable films	Ref.
January	15	Sidhu R Pillai	27	Actor	Second Show	
January	22	Ceylon Manohar	73	Actor, singer	Aavesham	
January	28	Kalamandalam Geethanandan	58	Actor	Kamaladalam • Thooval Kottaram • Irattakuttikalude Achan • Narendran Makan Jayakanthan Vaka • Manassinakkare • Romeoo • Aattakatha	
February	9	Bijoy Chandran		Producer	Romans • Oru Second Class Yathra	
February	13	Harikumaran Thampi	56	Actor	Dalamarmarangal • Teja Bhai & Family	
February	24	Sridevi	54	Actress, producer	Kumara Sambhavam • Poompatta • Thulavarsham • Angeekaaram • Satyavan Savithri • Devaraagam	
March	22	T.R. Sekar	81	Editor	Thacholi Ambu • Padayottam • My Dear Kuttichathan • Onnu Muthal Poojyam Vare	
April	5	Kollam Ajith	55	Actor, director	Nadodikkattu • Vettam • Calling Bell • Pakal Pole	
May	14	Kalasala Babu	67	Actor	Kasthooriman • Runway • Perumazhakkalam • Mallu Singh	
May	23	Vijayan Peringode	66	Actor	Devasuram • Meesa Madhavan • Pattalam • Oppam • 1971: Beyond Borders	
July	30	John Sankaramangalam	84	Director	Janmabhoomi • Avalalpam Vaikippoyi • Samantharam • Saramsham	
August	1	Umbayee (P. Abu Ibrahim)	68	Singer, Music Director	Amma Ariyan • Novel	
August	2	Ambili	51	Dubbing Artist	Lorry• Nakhakshathangal • Kaliveedu	
August	26	K. K. Haridas	52	Director	Vadhu Doctoranu• Kalyanappittannu • Josettante Hero	
September	11	Kunju Muhammed	68	Actor, Assistant Director	Pradeshika Varthakal • Ee Puzhayum Kadannu • Aami	
September	17	Captain Raju	68	Actor, Director	Nadodikkattu• Oru Vadakkan Veeragatha • Itha Oru Snehagatha • Masterpiece	
October	1	P.V. Ernest	73	Actor	Nadhi	
October	2	Balabhaskar	40	Violinist, Music Director	Mangalya Pallakku• Paattinte Palazhy	
October	2	Thampi Kannanthanam	64	Director	Rajavinte Makan • Vazhiyora Kazhchakal	
October	20	Rahman Mohammed Ali	30	Editor	Aakashavani• Jo and the Boy • Kaly	
November	10	Lakshmi Krishnamurthy	90	Actress	Panchagni • Ee Puzhayum Kadannu • Udhyanapalakan	
November	17	KTC Abdulla	82	Actor	Dweepu• Arabikkatha • Neelakasham Pachakadal Chuvanna Bhoomi • Sudani from Nigeria	
November	24	Ambareesh	66	Actor	Gaanam	
December	7	Karakulam Chandran	68	Actor	Sree Narayana Guru	
December	7	Abhimanyu Ramanandan	31	Actor	Ottamuri Velicham • Dakini	
December	13	Ajayan (Thoppil Ajayan)	68	Director	Perumthachan	
December	19	Geetha Salam	72	Actor	Gramophone	
December	21	K.L. Antony Kochi	79	Actor	Maheshinte Prathikaaram • Guppy • Georgettan's Pooram • Njandukalude Nattil Oridavela	
