= Rahul Ramachandran =

Indian film director and scriptwriter

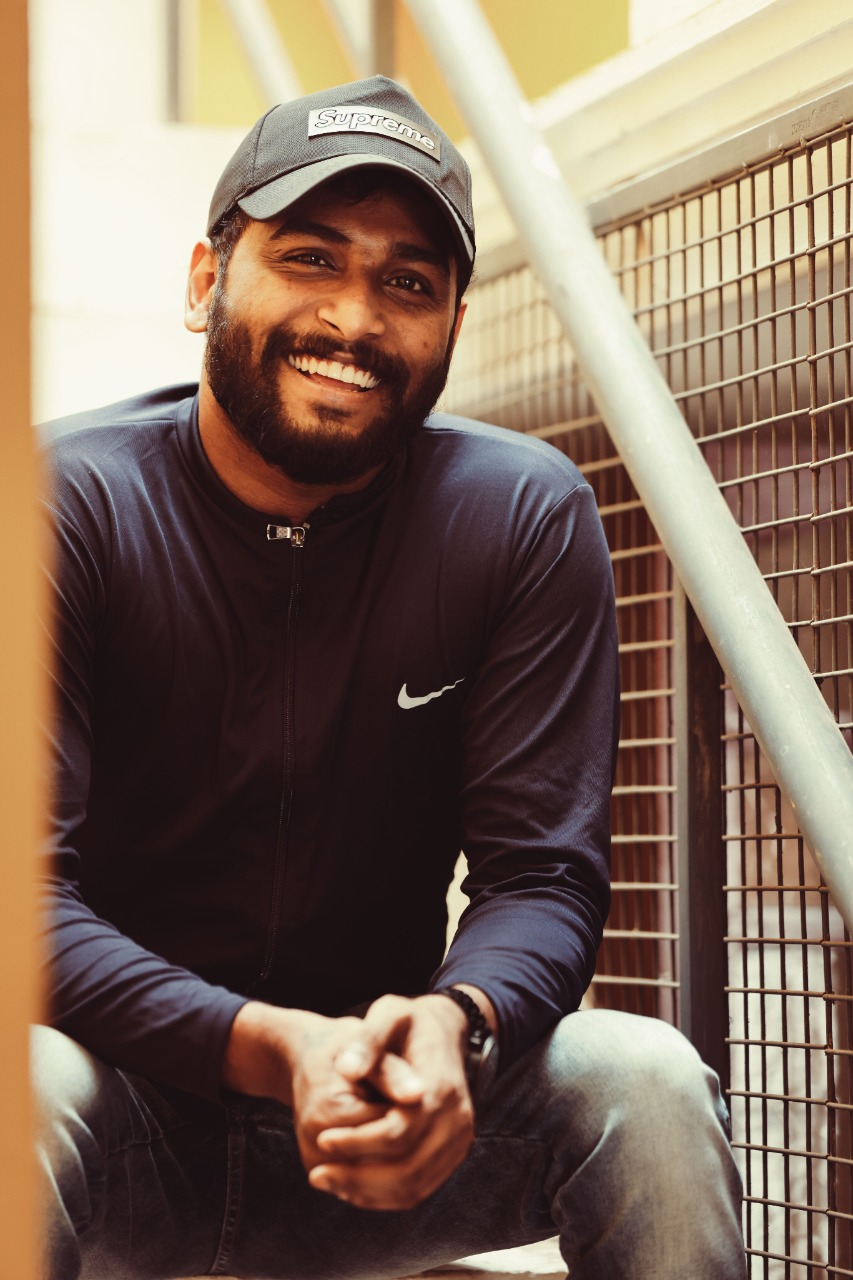
- Occupations: Film director; Scriptwriter
- Years active: 2017 –present

Rahul Ramachandran is an Indian film director and scriptwriter who works in the Malayalam film industry.

== Career ==
Ramachandran started his career in 2017 as a director for the short film Chin sin si starring Disney James and in 2018 he did a short film for Club FM named Neeyum Njanum Avanum starring RJ Musafir, RJ Maheen and RJ Vaishakh which went viral in the social media. In 2019 he did a short film named "ADAM" starring Kannan Nayar which got official selection for International Documentary and Short Film Festival of Kerala. Later in 2019, he has written and directed the movie Jeem Boom Bhaa and then scripted Njan Kanda Superman and further announced the movie project named SG 251 with prominent actor Suresh Gopi.

== Personal life ==
Rahul Ramachandran married Sreevidya Mullachery on 8 September 2024.

== Filmography ==
=== Feature films ===
As director

Year	Title	Cast	Notes
2019	Jeem Boom Bhaa	Askar Ali, Anju Kurian, Baiju Santhosh and Neha Saxena	Debut film as director
2021	SG 251	Suresh Gopi	

As Script Writer

Year	Title	Actor
2019	Jeem Boom Bhaa	Askar Ali, Anju Kurian, Baiju Santhosh and Neha Saxena
2019	Njan Kanda Superman	Askar Ali

== Recognition ==
- Adam - Official selection for IDSFFK.
