= Parecattil =

Parecattil or Parekattil is an Indian Malayali surname. Notable people with the surname include:

- Cardinal Mar Joseph Parecattil (1912–1987), Indian prelate of the Syro-Malabar Catholic Church.
- Kuruvilla Parecattil, was an 18th century priest well versed in traditional matters of the church who testified regarding the customary practices and traditional religious privileges of the Christian community, specifically concerning the solemn procession that conducted Bishop Francis Sales from Verapoly to the Alangad church.
- Dr. Benny Antony, an Indian scientist, credited with over 80 international patents.
- Manoj Varghese Parecattil (born 1981), Indian film director and writer

Mar Parekattil in his writings mentions the related people are scattered around Ernakulam, Thrissur, Kottayam regions of Kerala. While transferring the mortal remains of Archbishop Mar Joseph Kariattil a relative, a close relative's (sister) name was mentioned as Parekattil.
