= Janmabhoomi (1969 film) =

- Directed by: John Sankaramangalam
- Written by: John Sankaramangalam
- Produced by: John Sankaramangalam
- Starring: Madhu; Kottarakkara Sreedharan Nair; S. P. Pillai; Ushakumari; T. R. Omana
- Cinematography: Ashok Kumar
- Edited by: Ravi Kadakkal
- Music by: B. A. Chidambaranath
- Production company: Rooparekha
- Distributed by: Dinny Films
- Release date: 20 February 1969
- Running time: 130 min
- Country: India
- Language: Malayalam

Janmabhoomi (English: Birthplace) is a 1969 Malayalam film written, directed and produced by John Sankaramangalam. The film stars Madhu, Kottarakkara Sreedharan Nair, S. P. Pillai and Ushakumari in the lead roles. It marked the directorial debut of Sankaramangalam, who later directed critically acclaimed feature films like Avalalppam Vaikippoyi (1971) and Samantharam (1985), and cinematographer Ashok Kumar. It won the Nargis Dutt Award for Best Feature Film on National Integration and a Kerala State Film Award for Best Cinematography.

== Cast ==
- Kottarakkara Sreedharan Nair as Mathai
- Madhu as John
- S. P. Pillai as Pillai
- Manavalan Joseph as Usman
- Janardhanan as Nambiar
- Ramchand as Kunhan
- Ushakumari as Madhavi
- Shobha as Chembi
- T. R. Omana as Mariya
- Snehalatha as Thresya
- K. V. Sharada as Grameena
- Baby Saroja as Baby
- Baby Shanthi as Balan

== Soundtrack ==
The music was composed by B. A. Chidambaranath and the lyrics were written by P. Bhaskaran.

No.	Song	Singers	Lyrics	Length (m:ss)
1	"Arayadimannil Thudakkam"	M. Balamuralikrishna	P. Bhaskaran	
2	"Maanathe Mannaathikkoru"	S. Janaki	P. Bhaskaran	
3	"Malaranimandaarame"	S. Janaki, M. Balamuralikrishna	P. Bhaskaran	
4	"Mathimathi Ninte Mayilaattam"	B. Vasantha	P. Bhaskaran	
5	"Neelamalacholayile"	A. K. Sukumaran	P. Bhaskaran	
6	"Vellilamkaadum"	B. Vasantha	P. Bhaskaran	
7	"Vinnaalum Lokapithave"	M. S. Padma	P. Bhaskaran	

== Production ==
The film was made with financial support from the Film Finance Corporation. The film was shot in Wayanad on the Western Ghats. It was distributed by Dinny Films.

== Awards ==
The film won the Nargis Dutt Award for Best Feature Film on National Integration for its theme of religious co-existence. It also won the Kerala State Film Award for Best Cinematography for Ashok Kumar.
