= Kasaba (2016 film) =

2016 Indian film by Nithin Renji Panicker

- Official poster
- Directed by: Nithin Renji Panicker
- Written by: Nithin Renji Panicker
- Produced by: Alice George Joby George
- Starring: Mammootty; Sampath Raj; Neha Saxena; Varalaxmi Sarathkumar; Jagadish
- Cinematography: Sameer Haq
- Edited by: Mansoor Muthutty
- Music by: Rahul Raj
- Production company: Goodwill Entertainments
- Distributed by: Anto Joseph Film Company
- Release date: 7 July 2016
- Running time: 137 minutes
- Country: India
- Language: Malayalam
- Budget: ₹7.8 crore
- Box office: est. ₹14.37 crore

Kasaba is a 2016 Indian Malayalam-language crime thriller film written and directed by Nithin Renji Panicker, starring Mammootty, Sampath Raj, Neha Saxena, Varalaxmi Sarathkumar and Jagadish played the important supporting roles. The first day gross was the highest for a Malayalam film. The film ended up grossing ₹14.37 crore (US$1.5 million).

== Plot ==
CI Rajan Zachariah is a police officer posted at Palakkad district. Though he is somewhat an honest officer, Zachariah is a person who doesn't even give a thought about what people think and lives his life on his own terms. He is very close to IG Chandrasekhar who understands him and his son Arjun Chandrasekhar. Arjun and his fiancée get murdered in a blast mysteriously in Kaliyoor – a place located on the Kerala-Karnataka border. As per the police reports the deaths were due to Maoist attacks, but Chandrasekhar and Zachariah refuse to believe it. Being the godfather of Arjun, Zachariah asks Chandrasekhar to post him at Kaliyoor to find out the truth, who arrives at Kaliyoor and tries to solve the mystery behind deaths of Arjun and his fiancée and finds that the couple's death are connected to the death of 6 cops and CI Raghavan. Zachariah finds that the village head Parameshwaran Nambiar, along with Kamala, the in-charge of the brothel along had killed Raghavan.

Arjun and his fiancée witness a murder committed by Nambiar and flees. They are chased by Nambiar's goons. While escaping from Nambiar's goons, Arjun and his fiancée get into a police van by asking help introducing himself as I.G.'s son. Nambiar instructs his goons to attack the police van thereby killing Arjun and his fiancée, along with the 6 cops. Nambiar who is contesting district level elections, finds the caretaker of Kamala's brothel Thankachan, as a possible liability and kills him through his goons under the guise of a Maoist attack. It is later revealed in a letter (written by Thankachan before his death) that Kamala is Thankachan's daughter. Enraged, Kamala kills Nambiar with the help of Zachariah, and later calls Zachariah to thank him for helping her and she intends to finish him off to wipe the slate clean. Zachariah tactfully arrests her for killing Raghavan and Nambiar by acting friendly, where he also rescues the workers from the brothel and the brothel is permanently shut. In the end he helps Susan who was a sex worker at the brothel to come out of her immoral life and accepted her as his wife since she loved him and they move back to Kerala together.

== Cast ==
- Mammootty as Rajan Zachariah aka Kariyachan, Circle Inspector of Police
- Sampath Raj as Parameshwaran Nambiar
- Neha Saxena as Susan Rajan Zachariah
- Jagadish as Sub-inspector (S. I.) Mukundan
- Varalaxmi Sarathkumar as Kamala
- Maqbool Salmaan as Jagan
- Shaheen Siddique as Arjun
- Siddique as IGP Chandrashekhar IPS, Arjun's father and Zachariah's superior officer
- Alencier Ley Lopez as Thankachan, Kamala's father
- Biju Pappan as C.I. Raghavan, a corrupt and cruel cop
- Rakendu as Professor Jacob
- Jennifer Antony as Pavizham, S. I. Mukundan's wife
- Abu Salim as Pazhani
- Sasi Kalinga as Linguswamy
- Chinnu Kuruvila
- Sandeep Narayanan as a Goon

== Production ==
In January 2016, it was reported that Mammootty would star in Nithin Renji Panicker's directorial debut, the son of Malayalam screenwriter Renji Panicker. Raai Laxmi was earlier reported to be as the heroine, but later Varalaxmi Sarathkumar was confirmed to be part of the film.

The filming commenced in February 2016, and the unit filmed in locations of Kozhikode, Kolar Gold Fields and Pazhani. The filming ended in April.

== Release ==
The film was scheduled for an Eid release, on 7 July. The film's teaser has become one of the most viewed Malayalam film teaser, by completing 5.1 Lakhs (510,000) "real-time" views in 24 hours. At the time, the Kasaba teaser was the fastest Malayalam teaser to cross the 1 million mark, doing so in four days.

The film is available to stream with English subtitles on Sun NXT.

== Controversies ==
On 19 July 2016, Kerala Women's Commission sent court notices to actor Mammootty, director Nitin Panicker, and producer Alice George for allegedly portraying women in poor light in the film. Commission chairperson, K C Rosakutty Teacher, said that the film used dialogues which were "insulting to womanhood in general". She added, "In the name of freedom of expression, women cannot be insulted whether it is for character or else". When an actor like Mammootty involves in such projects, it may lead to a "dangerous acceptance" of such actions and remarks in the society. The commission also sent a report to AMMA and Malayalam Cine Technicians Association with a request to revise the film's certification.

In one of the most controversial scenes in the film, the rogue police officer character portrayed by Mammootty, walks over to a female police officer, pulls at her belt and tells her that he can make her miss her menstrual cycle. This scene came under severe criticism right from the film's release. In December 2017, specifically referring to this scene, actress Parvathy criticised the film as having misogynistic dialogue. She faced threats by a section of Mammootty fans, after which she filed a police complaint on 26 December. Several people came in support of Parvathy and the controversy sparked a discussion on misogyny in the entire film industry of Kerala, with several actresses mainly under the aegis of Women in Cinema Collective, came to the front questioning the male dominance in Malayalam cinema.

Responding to the criticism, Panicker remained undeterred and felt the sequence in question was misinterpreted. He claimed this was a needless controversy, and if he were to direct the film again, he would not change anything, and definitely not the said controversial sequence.

== Box office ==
The film received mixed reviews from the critics and was declared an average venture at the box office. The movie collected ₹2.43 crore (US$250,000) in Kerala on its first day. The film collected ₹7.35 crore (US$760,000) from first four days, and ₹8.18 crore (US$850,000) from first five days of release at the Kerala box office. The film collected ₹10.44 crore (US$1.1 million) in nine days of its theatrical run in Kerala, and ₹14.37 crore (US$1.5 million) in its final run.

== Possible sequel ==
Four years after the film's release, the film's producer Joby George hinted at a possible sequel.
