= Kavi Uddheshichathu..? =

- Theatrical release poster
- Directed by: Thomas Kutty & Liju Thomas
- Written by: Thomas Kutty; Martin Duro
- Screenplay by: Thomas Kutty; Martin Duro
- Produced by: Asif Ali; Sajin Jaffer
- Starring: Asif Ali; Biju Menon; Narain; Anju Kurian; Saiju Kurup
- Narrated by: Dileep
- Cinematography: Shehnad Jalal
- Edited by: Sunil S. Pilla
- Music by: Jakes Bejoy; Vinu Thomas
- Production company: Adam's World Of Imagination
- Distributed by: Adam's Release
- Release date: 8 October 2016
- Running time: 137 minutes
- Country: India
- Language: Malayalam

Kavi Uddheshichathu..? (transl. The poet's intention..? ) is a 2016 Indian Malayalam sports film directed by duo Thomas Kutty Naduvil and Liju Thomas. It features Asif Ali, Biju Menon, Narain and Saiju Kurup in lead roles along with Anju Kurian, Balu Varghese, Abhishek Raveendran, Ganapathy, Lena and Sija Rose in supporting roles. It is produced jointly by Asif Ali and Sajin Jaffer under the production Adam's World Of Imagination. The soundtrack and background score for the film are composed by Jakes Bijoy and Vinu Thomas. The film was released on 8 October 2016.

== Plot ==
Allimoola is noted for its passionate volleyball supporters and former history of players that is now only a memory. During each year's volleyball event, the villagers place secret bets on which team will win. Because of an event in their school days, Kavalam Jimmy and Vattathil Bosco are always at odds. In an impending yearly game, both of them stake their sisters for marriage. The entire community participates in the bet and organizes volleyball teams. Bosco employs Minnal Simon, a pathological debtor with some early negligible experience in the sport, to coach Jimmy's team to failure. The police officer Jimmy had a fight with and was on bad terms with is the one Bosco chooses to lead his team. Bosco pays off Jimmy's university players in the finals, and Simon vows to demonstrate his integrity. Circumstances force Jimmy and his buddies to fill in for their squad, and they win the game using some methods from Simon's playbook. Bosco gets a hint from Jimmy's sister that she likes him and he is content. Jimmy ends up with Bosco's sister, with whom he had developed a sort of affection, while Simon departs with Gladys, Jimmy's Female sponsor.

== Cast ==
- Asif Ali as Kavalathu Jimmy
  - Surya Kiran as Young Jimmy
- Biju Menon as Minnal Simon
- Narain as Vattathil Bosco
  - Abhinand as Young Vattathil Bosco
- Anju Kurian as Jasmine
  - Merlin as Young Jasmine
- Saiju Kurup as DYSP Noble Jacob
- Lena as Gladys
- Balu Varghese as Karal
- Sudhi Koppa as Dineshan
- Benson as Aneesh
- Abhishek Raveendran as Charles
- Ganapathy as Sukoor
- Abhijith as Kunjan
- Bindu Panicker as Shosamma, Jimmy's Mother
- Sija Rose as Lillykutty
- Chithra Shenoy as Soosamma, Jasmine's Mother
- Bijukuttan as Joshy
- Dinesh Prabhakar as Peter, Jimmy's Brother in law
- Veena Nair as Mollykutty, Jimmy's Sister
- Pradeep Kottayam as Broker Kunjose
- Manoj Guinness as Ithilkanni
- Alexander Prasanth as Shaji
- Renesha Rahman as Crying Baby's Mother
- Akku Melparamb as Panchayat President
- Sasi Kalinga as Kannettan
- Balaji Sarma as Benny
- Arun Mash as Thel
- Alleppey Ashraf as Binukuttan
- KTC Abdulla as Umbayikka
- Gokulan as Pallath Balan
- Tom Joseph as himself

== Production ==
After the success of their short film Ramaniyechiyude Namathil, Liju Thomas and Thomas Kutty ventured into making this film. The film was shot in the picturesque area around Iritty, Kannur. To achieve technical perfection, the creators gave detail attention to filming and editing the final climax scenes. Five cameras were used to film the game and 5000 spectators.

== Soundtrack ==
Kavi Uddheshichathu..?

Soundtrack album by Jakes Bejoy Vinu Thomas
- Released: 7 October 2016
- Recorded: 2016
- Genre: Feature film soundtrack
- Length: 13:27
- Label: Muzik 247

The original soundtrack was composed by Jakes Bejoy and Vinu Thomas.

Soundtrack
No.	Title	Lyrics	Singer(s)	Length
1.	"Innaleyum"	Rafeeq Ahammed	Arun Alat	3:03
2.	"Nerunde Nerunde"	Jyothish T Kasi	Suchith Suresan, Jakes Bejoy	3:27
3.	"Kuyilin Paattinu"	Jyothish T Kasi	P. Jayachandran	3:01
4.	"Paisa Paisa"	Jyothish T Kasi	Jakes Bejoy, Jaya Moorthy, TS Ayyappan	3:26
Total length:				13:27

== Release ==
The film started production in April 2016. Kavi Uddheshichathu..? released on 8 October 2016 in 73 screens across Kerala.

=== Critical reception ===
Deccan Chronicle reviewer Elizabeth Thomas rated it 2.5/5 and stated: "The plot of Kavi Udeshichathu is hardly unique due to recent Karinkunnam 6'S film and it is not hard to guess the flow of events. However, the movie is not disappointing either". Nikhil of Manorama Online says it a worth watchable flick with lot of fun. He praised the direction, casting and music. Abhijith of Filmibeat.com rated it 3/5 and states: "Kavi Uddheshichathu is a decent entertainer that has its own moments".

=== Box office ===
The film completed 50 days at the Kerala box office and went on to become an average hit.
