= Ramaniyechiyude Namathil =

- Directed by: Liju Thomas
- Written by: Kutty Naduvil
- Produced by: Raman Bodhi
- Starring: Arun Kumar; Para Babu
- Cinematography: Shafi
- Edited by: Lijo Thomas
- Music by: Vinu Thomas
- Production companies: Lal Media & Mega Media
- Release date: 2015
- Running time: 11 minutes
- Country: India
- Language: Malayalam

Ramaniyechiyude Namathil is a 2015 Malayalam short film directed by Liju Thomasstarring Arun Kumar and Para Babu. The film was screened at various festivals such as FEFKA short film festival and received many accolades. It won the first prize in the Shoot an Idea competition organised by Kappa TV.

The team joined with Asif Ali for the movie Kavi Uddheshichathu..? was released on 8 October 2016.

== Plot ==
A snake is doing an important role in this short film. Besides the snake, there are two characters in it — Ramani chechi's husband and his friend. The husband suspects that his friend admires Ramani chechi. It is this suspicion that leads him to push his friend into the well to get bitten by the snake.

== Cast ==
- Arun Kumar as Friend
- Para Babu as Husband

== Awards and honours ==
The awards and honours received by Ramaniyechiyude Namathil are:

- BEST FILM FEFKA SHORT FILM FEST 2014
- BEST FILM KAPPA TV SHOOT AN IDEA CONTEST SEASON 2
- BEST DIRECTOR STATE SHORT FILM FEST ALAPPUZHA 2015
- BEST FILM FESTTELLEN SHORT FILM FEST BANGALORE 2015
- BEST EDITOR – FESTTELLEN SHORT FILM FEST BANGALORE 2015
- BEST DIRECTOR – KOCHIN INTERNATIONAL SHORT FILM FEST 2015
- BEST ACTOR – KOCHIN INTERNATIONAL SHORT FILM FEST 2015
- BEST EDITOR – KOCHIN INTERNATIONAL SHORT FILM FEST 2015
- BEST FILM – BHARATH P.J ANTONY SHORT FILM FEST THRISSUR 2015
- BEST DIRECTOR – BHARATH P.J ANTONY SHORT FILM FEST THRISSUR 2015
- BEST SCRIPT – BHARATH P.J ANTONY SHORT FILM FEST THRISSUR 2015
- BEST EDITOR – BHARATH P.J ANTONY SHORT FILM FEST THRISSUR 2015
- BEST ACTOR – BHARATH P.J ANTONY SHORT FILM FEST THRISSUR 2015
- BEST CAMERA – BHARATH P.J ANTONY SHORT FILM FEST THRISSUR 2015
- BEST SOUND MIX – BHARATH P.J ANTONY SHORT FILM FEST THRISSUR 2015
- BEST DIRECTOR – EKTA SHORT FIL FEST CALICUT 2015
- 2ND BEST FILM – EKTA SHORT FIL FEST CALICUT 2015
- BEST ACTOR – IFLF SHORT FILM FEST TRIVANDRUM 2015
- BEST DIRECTOR – CONTACT SHORT FILM FEST TRIVANDRUM
- BEST FILM – MADIKAI SHORT FIL FEST 2014
- BEST DIRECTOR – MADIKAI SHORT FIL FEST 2014
- BEST FILM – KANNUR FILM CHAMBER AWARD 2015
- BEST DIRECTOR – KANNUR FILM CHAMBER AWARD 2015
- BEST SCRIPT – MESSAGE TELE FEST CHERTHALA 2015
- BEST EDITOR – MIRROR SHORT FILM FEST EKM 2015
- BEST FILM – KALAKSHETHA SHORT FILM FEST MES COLLEGE 2015
- BEST SOUND MIX – DON BOSCO INTERNATIONAL FEST COCIN 2014
