= Igloo (2019 film) =

2019 film directed by Bharath Mohan

- Release poster
- Directed by: Bharath Mohan
- Produced by: Vedikkaranpatti S. Sakthivel
- Starring: Amzath Khan; Anju Kurian
- Cinematography: Kugan S Palani
- Edited by: Prasanna GK
- Music by: Arrol Corelli
- Production company: Drumsticks Productions
- Distributed by: ZEE5
- Release date: 17 July 2019
- Running time: 138 minutes
- Country: India
- Language: Tamil

Igloo is a 2019 Indian Tamil-language romantic drama film directed by Bharath Mohan in his directorial debut. The film stars Amzath Khan and Anju Kurian. The film was a ZEE5 original film and was released on 17 July 2019.

== Plot ==
The film deals with the relationship between twin sisters Vaishnavi "Vaishu" (Arohi Radhakrishnan) and Aishwarya "Aishu (Anika Radhakrishnan). Vaishu, the elder sister, is good at studies, while Aishwarya is the exact opposite. Shiva (Amzath Khan) raises his daughters single-handedly in Ooty. The director has made subtle references to the fact that Shiva is slightly fonder of Aishu because she reflects certain qualities of her mother. But that certainly does not mean he loves Vaishu any less.

The kids grow up happily under the cozy comforts of their father’s protective umbrella and never miss their mother. However, one day, Vaishu feels the need to know about her mother and expects an answer from her father. Shiva, who feels he reserves the right to keep the secret undisclosed, ends up answering her question after circumstances compel him to recall the times spent with Ramya (Anju Kurian). The story moves back in time from this moment.

Shiva works as an architect, and Ramya works in a dance club. Shiva's character is portrayed as rugged and short-tempered, while Ramya's character is portrayed as calm and resilient. Despite the fact that Shiva is short-tempered, their love was evidently seen throughout the movie. One fine day, Ramya's parents fixed an alliance for her. Not able to handle the situation, Ramya opened about Shiva to her mother Jaya (Vinaya Prasad). Jaya, though shocked, promised to talk to her husband Suresh (Mathew Varghese) immediately. Suresh reluctantly agrees to meet Shiva. After a small chat with Shiva in a coffee shop, Suresh makes it clear that Shiva's divorced sister Maadhangi (Lizzie Antony) should not stay with him. This enrages Shiva, and he behaves slightly rude to Suresh. Ramya and Shiva fought a few days over the issue, until Ramya found out that she was pregnant. She told Shiva and her parents about this; though the former felt happy, the latter was obviously upset on the issue.

Maadhangi finally came and consoled Suresh. They reluctantly agree for their marriage. Both Ramya and Shiva were on cloud nine. Their happiness was short-lived when they find out that Ramya has stage three blood cancer and has to undergo an abortion as she needs to start chemotherapy. Shiva stands strong and refuses to abort his babies. Despite repeated requests from the doctors, Shiva refuses to harm his babies. At the same time, he swears to take care of Ramya carefully. Ramya starts her chemo treatments. As the chemo progresses, she loses her hair and feels insecure about that. On top of that, her mood swings gave Shiva a tough time. He kept aside his anger issues and took care of Ramya.

Ramya made a bucket list for her and Shiva to do before something bad happened to her. However, her mood swings went so bad that she started cursing the babies she carries. She could not tolerate the pain that the chemo instills on her body. She wanted to get rid of the pain. She tried to take a drug which would reduce the pain but at the same time may harm the babies. Shiva tries his best to bring her out of the thought of harming the babies.

The delivery date arrives. Ramya gives birth to twin sisters. Shiva gets emotional after seeing his daughters. Although Ramya felt alright during the birth, she also felt that her end was very near. She refuses to see her babies as it would instill the will to live and make the dying process more painful. As her situation gets worse, she starts to vomit blood and was admitted in the hospital. Finally, she agrees to see her babies and named them Vaishu and Aishu before dying.

The film ends with Vaishu opening her eyes from the operation as Shiva finishes the story, reconciling emotionally as the film ends.

== Cast ==
- Amzath Khan as Siva
- Anju Kurian as Ramya
- Arohi Radhakrishnan as Vaishnavi "Vaishu" – Ramya and Siva's elder daughter
- Anika Radhakrishnan as Aishwarya "Aishu – Ramya and Siva's younger daughter
- RJ Vigneshkanth as Kumar, a fisherman
- Bagavathi Perumal as Sundar, Siva's best friend
- Mathew Varghese as Suresh, Ramya's father
- Vinaya Prasad as Jaya, Ramya's mother
- Lizzie Antony as Maadhangi, Siva's elder sister
- Jeeva Ravi as Doctor
- Munnar Ramesh as Police officer
- Teju Ashwini as Ramya's friend
- Ramanathan as Dr. Selvam, MD (Gynecology)

== Reception ==
The New Indian Express gave the film a 3.5 out of 5 saying that the film is "a heart-warming love story". A critic from Film Companion stated that "Maybe the intention of the film is to create an unapologetic weep-fest for people looking for TV soap like content on the web. But if it’s cinema that it was after, then Igloo just leaves you out in the cold". A review by ZEE5 noted the film "speaks volumes about the intangible power of love".
