= Sreevidya Mullachery =

Indian serial actress

- Born: Perumbala, Kerala, India
- Occupation: Actress
- Years active: 2016–present

Sreevidya Nair, known by her stage name Sreevidya Mullachery, is an Indian film actress who predominantly works in Malayalam Movie Industry.

== Personal life ==
Sreevidya married Rahul Ramachandran on 8th September 2024.

== Career ==
She made her debut in the movie Campus Diary along with former Chief Minister of Kerala V. S. Achuthanandan, later she has acted in the several movies including Oru Kuttanadan Blog along with Mammootty and Anu Sithara and the movie Oru Pazhaya Bomb Kadha along with Bibin George and Prayaga Martin. She is best known for the TV show Star Magic on Flowers TV. In September 2021, she received a silver play button from YouTube. She has acted as heroine alongside Dhyan Sreenivasan for her next movie Sathyam Mathrame Bodhippikkoo.

== Filmography ==
=== Feature films ===
Year	Title	Role	Notes	Ref.
2018	Oru Kuttanadan Blog	Maya		
2018	Oru Pazhaya Bomb Kadha	Sowmya		
2019	Maffi Dona	Malavika	Debut film as heroine	
2022	Night Drive	Ammini Ayyappan		
2022	Escape	Nayanthara		
2022	Sathyam Mathrame Bodhippikkoo	Sini Varghese		
2021	Thala	Maala		

=== Web series ===
Year	Title	Role	Ref.
2021	Just Married Things	Balamani	
2022	Just Married Things Season 2	Balamani	
