= Fourth River =

2020 film

- Film poster
- Directed by: RK Dreamwest
- Screenplay by: RK Dreamwest
- Story by: RK Dreamwest
- Produced by: Johnson Thankachan; George Varkey
- Starring: Diphul Mathew; Nithu Chandran; Baiju Bala; Vandhitha Manoharan
- Cinematography: Nithin K Raj
- Music by: Rhrithwik S Chand
- Production company: Dreamwest Global India Pvt. Ltd.
- Distributed by: Amazon Prime Video
- Release date: 28 June 2020
- Running time: 119 minutes
- Country: India
- Language: Malayalam

Fourth River is a 2020 Indian Malayalam-language political thriller film directed by RK DreamWest, starring Diphul Mathew, Nithu Chandran, Baiju Bala and Rahul Krishna in key roles. Released on 28 June 2020 through Amazon Prime Video, it is the first ever Malayalam language film to have a direct to OTT.

The film produced under the banner of Dreamwest Global by executive producers Johnson Thankachan and George Varky is shot in and around Munnar Valley, Ponmudi and Chitranjali Studio, Thiruvananthapuram.

== Plot ==
Fourth River tells the life of four Naxalite revolutionaries: Naxalite Stephen, his wife Comrade Sophia, his daughter Naxalite Anitha, and their mentor Naxalite Ravi Master as they lived through a turbulent period of the Naxalite movement in India.

== Cast ==
- Diphul Mathew
- Nithu Chandran
- Baiju Bala
- Vandhitha Manoharan
- Rahul Krishna
- Mohan Ollur
- Ala Lakshman
- Pramod Padiyath
- John Joe

== Production ==
Director RK DreamWest had the intention to make a film based on the Communist political movement in India that started in the early 1920s as an anti-colonial struggle when the country was still ruled by Britain. The film progresses through the time after independence in 1947 when the moderate faction of the party joined the democratic process and became the ruling party in several Indian states. In 1967, the dissatisfied extreme left revolutionaries who believed in the Maoist ideology split from the party and launched an armed uprising in the remote tribal village of Naxalbari. Despite several brutal crackdowns, the movement quickly spread to the Southern states. The armed revolutionaries were branded as Naxalites. Since then many of them moved to jungles and remote tribal villages continuing their struggle through guerrilla wars.

The film focuses on the struggle of plantations workers in Munnar, a mountain region in South India known for Tea Plantations. Plantation owners had been exploiting workers through bonded slavery and cruel punishments for decades. The exploitation culminated in the '90s. Workers launched union strikes under the leadership of the Communist party. As the strike prolonged to several months, poverty and suicides became a routine thing in the valley. Slowly the Communist party lost interest in the strikes and workers became desperate. Naxalites moved in; several workers joined the Naxalite movement changing the life in the valley forever; for better or worse. As demanded by the screenplay, the film was shot in and around Munnar, Ponmudi, and Chitranjali Studio, Thiruvananthapuram. With the Prime Video as the distributor, Fourth River became the first ever Malayalam language film to have a direct to OTT release on 28 June 2020.

== Awards ==
The film won the best feature film and the best cinematographer award for Nithin.K Raj at the Canadian cinematography awards and won the best director, best cinematographer and '3rd best feature film' awards at Prague International Film Festival.
