= Jeem Boom Bhaa =

2019 film by Rahul Ramachandran

Jeeem Boom Bhaa
- Directed by: Rahul Ramachandran
- Written by: Vivek Raj Limu Shanker Rahul Ramachandran
- Produced by: Sachin VG
- Starring: Askar Ali; Anju Kurian; Neha Saxena; Baiju Santhosh
- Cinematography: Anoop V Shylaja
- Edited by: Prakash Rana
- Music by: P S Jayhari; Jubair Muhammed
- Production company: Mystic Frames Productions
- Release date: May 24, 2019 (India)
- Running time: 118 min
- Country: India
- Language: Malayalam

Jeem Boom Bhaa is a 2019 Indian Malayalam-language comedy thriller film written and directed by Rahul Ramachandran. The film is produced by Mystic Frames Productions. It stars Askar Ali, Anju Kurian, Baiju Santhosh, Aneesh Gopal, and Neha Saxena in the lead roles. The film began in August 2018.

== Premise ==
Three close friends face three different problems and are forced to confront them on the special occasion of New Year's Eve.

== Cast ==
- Askar Ali as Basil Kanjikuzhi
- Aneesh Gopal as Kunjumon Chacko
- Anju Kurian as Diana
- Neha Saxena as Model Dolby
- Aparna Balamurali as Muth
- Baiju Santhosh as Clay Ravi
- Kannan Nayar as S.I Valthsan

== Marketing and controversy ==
The first look poster was released with lead actors holding guns. The poster created controversy as it was resembling a famous shot from Pulp Fiction. Later Rahul Ramachandran clarified on his Facebook page that it has nothing to do with the film, and the poster was created to create a hype.

The teaser trailer of the film was unveiled on March 14, 2019, by actor Dulquer Salmaan.

== Reception ==
=== Critical response ===
The film was released on 24 May 2019. Upon release the film garnered negative reviews and Anna Mathews of The Times of India rated the movie 1.5/5 stating that Jeem Boom Bhaa doesn't have much to offer and the director Rahul seems to have created a story to somehow make a movie ."
