= Sambhavam Adhyayam Onnu =

2026 Indian film

- Thetrical release poster
- Directed by: Jithu Satheesan Mangalathu
- Written by: Jithu Satheesan Mangalathu
- Produced by: Faras Mattappally; Fahad Sidheekh; Fayez Mohammed
- Starring: Askar Ali; Vineeth Kumar; Assim Jamal
- Cinematography: Naveen Najose
- Edited by: Arjun Prakash
- Music by: Godwin Thomas
- Production company: Nalla Cinema Productions
- Release date: 6 March 2026
- Running time: 129 minutes
- Country: India
- Language: Malayalam

Sambhavam Adhyayam Onnu (lit: Incident Chapter One) is a 2026 Indian Malayalam-language time loop mystery horror thriller film written and directed by Jithu Satheesan Mangalathu. It stars Askar Ali, Vineeth Kumar and Assim Jamal.

== Plot ==
The film opens with a prologue set in a dense forest on the Kerala–Tamil Nadu border, where a Portuguese matriarch attempts to hide the bodies of a young woman and her husband, hinting at a deep-seated curse within the land. Decades later in 1994, a police team—including the protagonist's father—is transporting prisoners through the same area. When an escape attempt leads to a gunshot, the noise triggers a temporal anomaly, causing the entire group to vanish without a trace. In the present day, Anand is a civil police officer who grew up as an orphan due to his father's disappearance. He joins a team consisting of CPO Reji and SI MG Ashokan to find a Tamil Nadu police officer who went missing in the same "Velloorkkatt" forest. Upon entering, they discover skeletal remains and a mysterious wireless set. The plot takes a supernatural turn when blood is spilled on the forest floor, reactivating a time loop. The officers find themselves trapped in a "glitch" where certain sounds or violence cause them to jump between different timelines.

As they struggle to survive, Anand encounters a hermit-like figure who reveals that the forest is a "spiral" where time and space are distorted. Long ago, a certain tribe used to worship a crow deity for prosperity. However, the tribe perished during the persecution of the Portuguese colonists. The sheer violence offended the deity who placed a curse that triggered a time loop whenever noise exceeded a certain limit or when blood is spilt in the vicinity of the statue. The only way to escape the time loop and the forest is to prevent the event that triggered the time loop in the first place. In the climax, Anand realizes he has the opportunity to alter the past. He manages to meet his father during the 1994 incident and facilitates his escape back to the correct timeline. However, the film ends on a haunting note, suggesting that while one life was saved, the forest itself remains a permanent gateway of temporal chaos, still tied to the ancient massacre committed by the Portuguese.

== Cast ==
- Askar Ali as CPO Anand
- Vineeth Kumar as CPO Reji
- Assim Jamal as SI M.G Ashokan
- Sidharth Bharathan as Portuguese spy
- Senthil Krishna as CPO Joshy Varghese
- Fahad Sidheekh as Stephen George
- Vijay Muthu as Tamil Nadu ASI
- Neethu Krishna as Neethu
- Suparna as Anand's daughter
  - Krishvu Praveen as Anand's Daughter (young)
- Kudassanad Kanakam as Peter's wife
- Shaji Kalagramam as Muthuvel
- Didimos Paul as Peter
- Rajkumar as Munisamy
- Shyam as Selvam
- Shine Prakash as Das
- Vihan as Peter's son

== Release ==
=== Theatrical ===
The film released theatrically on 6 March 2026. The film received generally positive reviews from critics and audience. The film became a moderate success.

=== Home Media ===
The digital streaming rights of the film is acquired by JioHotstar and began streaming from 15 April 2026.
