= Cochin Shadhi at Chennai 03 =

2020 Tamili and Malayalam movie

- Film poster
- Directed by: Manjith Divakar
- Written by: Rijesh Bhaskar
- Produced by: Arya Adhi International
- Starring: R. K. Suresh; Vinoth Kishan; Neha Saxena
- Cinematography: Ayyappan N.
- Edited by: Bijilesh KB
- Music by: Sunny Viswanath
- Distributed by: Bid Cinema
- Release dates: 24 January 2020 (Malayalam); 31 January 2020 (Tamil)
- Running time: 127 minutes
- Country: India
- Languages: Malayalam; Tamil

Cochin Shadhi at Chennai 03 is a 2020 Indian Malayalam-language action film directed by Manjith Divakar. The film stars R. K. Suresh, Akshatha Sreedhar Shastry, Neha Saxena, and Vinoth Kishan as leading cast members. The film follows main character Shadika on her journey to Chennai where she encounters trouble along the way. The film's setting in Kerala and Tamil Nadu meant that the film also has some Tamil dialogues. The film was dubbed released in Tamil as Vanmurai (transl. Violence).

== Cast ==
- R. K. Suresh as ACP Ameer Yousaf
- Neha Saxena as Zareena Thomas
- Charmila as Lakshmi
- Vinoth Kishan as Auto Renjan
- Shivaji Guruvayoor as Bus Driver
- Akshita Sridhar as Shadika
- Aswini as Dr. Renuka
- Suyog Raju as Bobby
- Sambu Thilak as Sam Alex
- Vigil Varghese as Rahul
- Abubakar as Saravanan
- Kiran Raj as CI Prathapan
- Anusheelan S as Bus Staff
- Shiyju B. Kallara as SI Sakthivel

== Production ==
The film is based on a real-life incident that happened in Coimbatore: a teenage girl boards the wrong bus, initiating a series of interesting events. Filming was originally planned to be only shot in Malayalam, but the film also contains Tamil dialogues. The film was promoted as a bilingual by its makers although there were no evident reshoots.

== Reception ==
A critic from The Times of India gave the film a rating of one-and-a-half out of five stars and stated that "Cochin Shadhi At Chennai 03 is a cringe-fest you can avoid without a second thought. It has nothing new to offer, making it stale wine in an old bottle". Regarding the Tamil dubbed version, Maalaimalar praised the story, music, and cinematography while criticizing the screenplay.
