= Kaliyoor, Kasaragod =

Kaliyoor
- village
- Location in Kerala, India Kaliyoor (India)
- Coordinates: 12°44′0″N 74°57′0″E
- Country: India
- State: Kerala
- District: Kasaragod
- Talukas: Kasaragod

Languages
  - Official: Kannada, Malayalam, English
- Time zone: UTC+5:30 (IST)
- PIN: 671323
- Vehicle registration: KL-14

Kaliyoor is a village in Kasaragod district in the state of Kerala, India.

== Transportation ==
Local roads have access to National Highway No.66 which connects to Mangalore in the north and Calicut in the south. The nearest railway station is Manjeshwar on Mangalore-Palakkad line. There is an airport at Mangalore.

== Languages ==
This locality is an essentially multi-lingual region. The people speak Kannada, Malayalam, Tulu, Beary bashe and Konkani. Migrant workers also speak Hindi and TamilUrdu languages.

== Administration ==
This village is part of Manjeswaram assembly constituency which is again part of Kasaragod (Lok Sabha constituency)
