= John Sankaramangalam =

Indian film director, producer and writer

- Born: T. C. John; 16 July 1934; Eraviperoor, Kerala
- Died: 30 July 2018 (aged 84); Thiruvalla, Kerala, India
- Education: FTII
- Occupations: Film director, producer, screenwriter, writer, professor
- Years active: 1962–2018
- Spouse: Mariyamma John
- Children: 2

John Sankaramangalam (16 July 1934 – 30 July 2018) was an Indian filmmaker and former director of the FTII, Pune. He also served as vice-chairman of Kerala State Chalachitra Academy, principal of St. Joseph College of Communication and as a jury member of the International Film Festival of India. He was an executive member of CILECT.

He was a renowned teacher in filmmaking and the recipient of numerous awards including National Film Award, Kerala State Film Award and Nargis Dutt Award.

== Biography ==
=== Early life ===
Sankaramangalam was born on 16 July 1934, in Eraviperoor of Pathanamthitta district. He was the son of Thaiparambil Sankaramangalam T.O. Chacko and Annamma. After completing his schooling from St. John's School, Eraviperoor, he joined St. Berchmans College, Changanassery and later MCC for higher studies.

=== Film career ===
Sankaramangalam became a teacher at the age of 19 at MCC. Later he quit the job and joined FTII in 1962. He obtained a diploma in film direction and script writing from FTII. Veteran filmmaker Adoor Gopalakrishnan was his classmate.

He entered the film industry by writing the screenplay for the Tamil film Jayasree. His first directorial venture was Janmabhoomi which was released in 1969. The film won the Nargis Dutt Award and Kerala State Film Award. In 1977, he directed Samadhi, a documentary film about B. K. S. Iyengar to help a cinematography student. The film won him Rajat Kamal for Best Experimental Film at 25th National Film Awards.

In 2003, he won the Chalachitra Prathibha award from Kerala Film Critics Association for his contribution to Malayalam cinema as a director.

=== Death ===
Sankaramangalam died on July 30, 2018, due to age-related illness.

== Selected filmography ==
| Year | Title | Duration | Category | Cast | Awards | Notes |
|---|---|---|---|---|---|---|
| | Jayasree | | Tamil Feature Film | | | Screenwriter |
| 1969 | Janmabhoomi | | Feature Film | Madhu (actor), Kottarakkara Sreedharan Nair, S. P. Pillai and Ushakumari | Nargis Dutt Award for Best Feature Film on National Integration, Kerala State Film Award for Best Cinematography | |
| 1971 | Avalalppam Vaikippoyi | | Feature Film | Prem Nazir, Sheela, Jayabharathi and Adoor Bhasi | | |
| 1976 | This is HMT Time | 5 minutes | Short Documentary | | | Credited as John T. C. Shankaramangalam |
| 1977 | Samadhi | | Documentary Film | B. K. S. Iyengar | Rajat Kamal for Best Experimental Film | |
| 1985 | Samantharam | 110 minutes | Feature Film | Soorya, Babu Namboothiri, Sai Das and Balan | | |
| 1994 | Saramsham | | Feature Film | Sreenivasan, Srividya, Nedumudi Venu, Anusha, Kakka Ravi | | |
