= Oru Kuttanadan Blog =

- Poster
- Directed by: Sethu
- Written by: Sethu
- Produced by: Muraleedharan; Shantha Muraleedharan
- Starring: Mammootty; Shamna Kasim; Ananya; Raai Laxmi; Anu Sithara
- Cinematography: Pradeep Nair
- Edited by: Shameer Muhammed
- Music by: Songs: Sreenath Sivasankaran; Background score: Bijibal
- Production company: Anantha Visions
- Distributed by: Anantha Visions Through Murali Films
- Release date: 14 September 2018
- Running time: 2hr 17min
- Country: India
- Language: Malayalam
- Budget: ₹8 crore
- Box office: ₹3.5crore

Oru Kuttanadan Blog is an Indian Malayalam language comedy film directed and written by Sethu. The film marks Sethu's directorial debut and stars Mammootty, Shamna Kasim, Raai Laxmi, Anu Sithara, Ananya, Adil Ibrahim, Sunny Wayne, Jacob Gregory, Lalu Alex and Nedumudi Venu. The background music was composed by Bijibal. The story is set in the backdrop of Kuttanad. The film was released on 14 September 2018. It was a disaster in the theatre because of poor screenplay and casting.

== Plot ==
Mammootty plays the role of Hari, an influential person in the area. The movie narrates the story of Hari and the people in his hometown, Krishnapuram.

== Cast ==
- Mammootty as Nediyedath Hari
- Shamna Kasim as SI Neena Kurup
- Lalu Alex as G.P Nair, Panchayat President
- Raai Laxmi as Sreejaya
- Anu Sithara as Hema
- Sreevidya Mullachery as Maya
- Nedumudi Venu as Nediyedath Hari's father
- Sanju Sivram as Sudhy
- Jayan Cherthala as Paul
- Swasika as Sujatha
- Sunny Wayne as Gopan
- Ananya as Gopan's wife
- Jacob Gregory as Tony
- Shaheen Siddique as Rameshan
- Vivek Gopan
- Thankachan Vithura
- Sohan Seenulal as Peter
- Adil Ibrahim as Rahul Bhanuprasad
- Kalabhavan Haneef as Varkky
- Jude Anthany Joseph as Prakashan
- Arun V. Narayan as Binu
- Prasanth as Pauly
- Shaju as Shaju
- Balaji Sarma as Pambadi Vijayan
- Adham Ayub
- Ponnamma Babu
- Thesni Khan
- Karthik Vishnu as Senthil Senthamarakshan
- P R Rajasekharan (Xavier- Saevi)
- Indu Thampy- cameo appearance
- Vineeth Kumar - cameo appearance
- Binny Tom

== Production ==
The film was initially titled Kozhi Thankachan and was later renamed to Oru Kuttanadan Blog. The shoot began in March 2018. The film is set in Kuttanad.

== Box office ==
The film was a failure at the box office. It cost ₹8 crore to make and reportedly grossed ₹ 3.5 crore worldwide in its final run.
