= Sakhavinte Priyasakhi =

2018 Malayalam movie

- Theatrical release poster
- Directed by: Sidheeque Thamarasseri
- Written by: Sidheeque Thamarasseri
- Produced by: Khalid Cherpulassery
- Starring: Sudheer Karamana; Neha Saxena; Amith Jolly; Salim Kumar; Shine Tom Chacko; Kalabhavan Shajohn; Khalid Cherpulassery
- Cinematography: K G Ratheesh
- Music by: Harikumar Hareram
- Production company: Janapriya Cinemas
- Release date: 5 January 2018
- Country: India
- Language: Malayalam

Sakhavinte Priyasakhi (lit. 'Comrade's Beloved Wife') is a 2018 Indian Malayalam-language political thriller film written and directed by Sidheeque Thamarasseri. Starring Sudheer Karamana, Neha Saxena, Amit Jolly, Salim Kumar, Kalabhavan Shajohn, and Shine Tom Chacko. The film was released in India on 5 January 2018.

== Synopsis ==
Rohini is the widow of a Communist leader in Kannur. Rohini's husband is killed in a political fight, soon after their marriage. The movie narrates the life of Rohini after the death of her husband.

== Cast ==
- Neha Saxena as Rohini
- Sudheer Karamana as Sakhavu Shiva Prasad
- Shine Tom Chacko
- Salim Kumar
- Kalabhavan Shajohn
- Amith Jolly
- Megha Mathew
- Indrans
- Anoop Chandran
- Ardra Nair
- Hareesh Kanaran
- kolapully Leela
- Kochu Preman
- Jolly Bastin

== Production ==
It is the first independent production by Arshad P. P. kodiyil under the banner of Janapriya cinemas. On 29 January 2017, a pooja function was held at Ottapalam. Indian politician Paloli Mohammed Kutty done the first clap of the film. The principal photography commenced along with the pooja ceremony. The movie, directed by Sidheeque Thamarasseri, has a female-centric script based on the politics in Kannur. Neha Saxena plays Rohini, opposite Sudheer Karamana's Sakhavu Shivaprasad. She is a woman who struggles to live after her husband's demise." The filming was wrapped in May 2017.

== Music ==
The film contains songs composed by Harikumar Hareram. The lyrics were written by Rafeeq Ahamed and Alankode Leelakrishnan.
