= Swargakkunnile Kuriakose =

Indian film directed by Emmanuvel N. K.

- Directed by: Emmanuvel N. K.
- Written by: Ramabhadran Thamburan; Emmanuvel N. K.
- Produced by: Advocate Cyrill Skaria Pailithanam
- Starring: Rajeesh Puttad; Sindhya Viswanath; Jaya Babu
- Edited by: Jobin Inchappara
- Music by: Linu Keezhillam
- Production company: Friday Reel Movies
- Release date: 2018
- Running time: 110 minutes
- Country: India
- Language: Malayalam

Swargakkunnile Kuriakose is an Indian Malayalam-language psycho suspense thriller film directed by Emmanuvel N. K. and starring Rajeesh Puttad in the title role. The film is produced by Advocate Cyrill Skaria Pailithanam under the banner of Friday Reel Movies, written by Ramabhadran Thamburan and Emmanuvel N. K. The film also stars Sindhya Viswanath, Jaya Babu, Venkurinji Gopinath, Jo Garner, Suresh Babu and Biju Madhavan. The film background score and soundtrack were composed by Linu Keezhillam and Vishnu Siva, Shiju S. Vismaya and Bineesh Puthuppanam penned all the lyrics while art direction was handled by Sachin K. Santhosh and edited by Jobin Inchappara. it is a 110-minute commercial movie.

The film released across Kerala on 29 June 2018.

== Plot ==
Kuriakose was born in the village of Swargakunnu. His parents are farmers, and he doesn't have any siblings. Being a single son, his parents brought him up with utmost care and love. but he grew up as a coward, afraid of the dark and death. Even after passing age 30, Kuriakose remains lazy, refusing to go to work or leave his home. He was shocked to hear of the death of his friend and former classmate, Biju. This constant fear causes him to believe that his cholesterol and BP is high, so he makes a juice out of chili peppers as advised in Social media and health magazines to lower them. However, this juice causes him to have severe pain. His parents and neighbours try to take him to the hospital, but Kuriakose refuses to go because of his fear. The constant fear, shame and pressure from his family forces him to leave home, mentally unstable. On his way to the junction, Kuriakose sees the poster of missing motivator and singer, Chandra Das, causing him more fear.

His Pastor and the church prays and searches for Kuriakose without informing police. But Kuriakose, in his mental instability falls into a pit. In that same pit, he sees the body of Chandra Das. Fearful, he hides the body with dried leaves and mud. This experience helped Kuriakose finally to gain some courage. Meanwhile, Sandhya, a girl who is tortured by her father and his friends, runs away from home and coincidentally falls into the same pit.

In the pit they were trapped for around four days. After hearing Sandhya's past, Kuriakose decided to support her and live together. Kids playing next to the pit found Kuriakose and Sandhya trapped there. The villagers rescue them and the police recover Chandra Das' dead body from the pit. Kuriakose, having found a suicide note, hands it over to the police as evidence. Kuriakose's mother and father object to his union with Sandhya as she is from a different caste, but the Pastor defends them. Sandya's father also tries to stop them, but the reformed Kuriakose's decision was strong and he decided to live in Swargakunnu together with Sandhya.

== Cast ==
- Rajeesh Puttad as Kuriakose
- Sindhya Viswanath as Sandhya
- Jaya Babu as Eliyamma
- Venkurinji Gopinath as Kunju
- Jo Garner as Pastor
- K. C. Vijayamma as Jancy (Friend)
- Suresh Babu as Chandradas (Poet)
- Biju Madhavan as Church Secretary
- Hareesh Purushothaman as Church Member
- Miya Ashraf as Sandhya's Father
- Anil Elavoor as Chakyar
- Jithin Mathew Babu as Jibin, Church Member
- Sruthi Simon as Friend
- Evan Emmanuvel as Baby actor
