= Anju Kurian =

Indian film actress

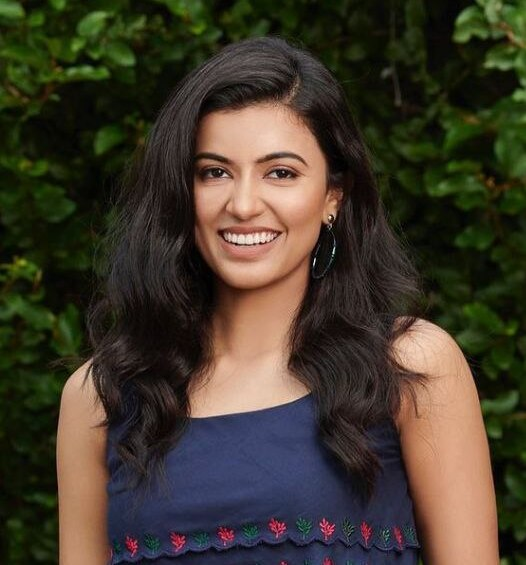
- Anju in 2023
- Born: Anju Kurian; 9 August 1993 (age 33); Kottayam, Kerala, India
- Occupation: Actress
- Years active: 2013–present
- Spouse: Roshan Karippaparambil (m. 2026)

Anju Kurian (born 9 August 1993) is an Indian actress and model who appears mainly in Malayalam and Tamil films. She is best known for her roles in the Malayalam films Kavi Uddheshichathu (2016), Njan Prakashan (2018) and Igloo (2019).

== Career ==
She started her career in the Malayalam film industry with a supporting role in the movie Neram, directed by Alphonse Puthren. The following year, she played a supporting role in Ohm Shanthi Oshaana. In 2016, she made her debut as one of the leads in Kavi Uddheshichathu..? directed by Thomas Kutty and Liju Thomas. She has also acted in several short films and music videos.

== Personal life ==
Anju is from Kottayam. She studied architecture at the Hindustan Institute of Technology and Science in Chennai. She worked at a firm for two years before quitting to pursue an acting career. Since 2024, She is engaged to Roshan Karippaparambil The couple got married on 7 November 2026.

== Filmography ==
Key
†	Denotes films that have not yet been released

=== Films ===
Year	Title	Role	Language	Notes
2013	Neram	Mathew's sister	Malayalam	Bilingual film
2013	Neram	Vetri's sister	Tamil	Bilingual film
2014	Ohm Shanthi Oshaana	Anna Maria	Malayalam	
2014	Masala Republic	Akhila Varma	Malayalam	
2015	Premam	Anju	Malayalam	
2016	2 Penkuttikal	Anagha	Malayalam	
2016	Kavi Uddheshichathu..?	Jasmine	Malayalam	Debut as lead actress
2017	Chennai 2 Singapore	Roshini	Tamil	
2018	Njan Prakashan	Shruthi	Malayalam	
2018	Idam Jagath	Mahati	Telugu	
2019	July Kaatril	Shreya	Tamil	
2019	Igloo	Ramya	Tamil	Released on ZEE5
2019	Jeem Boom Bhaa	Diana	Malayalam	
2019	Shibu	Kalyani	Malayalam	
2019	Jack & Daniel	Susmita	Malayalam	
2022	Meppadiyan	Renuka	Malayalam	
2022	Sila Nerangalil Sila Manidhargal	Rithu	Tamil	
2023	Single Shankarum Smartphone Simranum	Tulasi Radhakrishnan	Tamil	
2024	Abraham Ozler	Aneesha	Malayalam	
2025	Oho Enthan Baby	Herself	Tamil	
2025	Others	Inspector Beena	Tamil	
2026	Idhayam Murali	Thulasi	Tamil	Cameo appearance
TBA	Wolf †		Tamil	

=== Other works ===
Year	Title	Role	Language	Notes
2015	Serndhu Polama	Dancer	Tamil	Special appearance in promotional song
2016	Paper Boat	Varsha	Malayalam	Musical short film
2017	Tag	Sera	Malayalam	Short film
2018	Neeye Neeye	-	Tamil	Music video
2018	Glassmates - Kadhalikuren	Teacher	Tamil	Music video
2018	Kure Kure	Tamil Girl	Tamil	Music video
2019	Naan Seidha Kurumbu	Anjana	Tamil	Short film
2019	Thandora	Arthi	Tamil	Short film
2022	Vaadi Vaadi	-	Tamil	Music Video
2024	Ente Omane	TBA	Tamil	Music Video
2024	Karthi Kalyani	Kalyani	Malayalam	Short film

=== Awards and nominations ===
Year	Award	Category	Result	Ref.
2022	INFLUENCEX 2022	Kerala Face of the Year	Winner	
