= Sivaprasad =

Sivaprasad may refer to:

- Kaviyoor Sivaprasad, Indian film director and screenwriter
- Naramalli Sivaprasad (1951–2019), Indian politician and actor
- Raja Sivaprasad (1823–1895), Indian scholar, linguist, and historian
