= Orange Valley =

- Directed by: RK Dreamwest
- Screenplay by: RK Dreamwest
- Story by: RK Dreamwest
- Produced by: Johnson Thankachan; George Varkey
- Starring: Bibin Mathai; Deepul; Baiju Balan; Vandhitha Manoharan; Mohan Ollur; Ala Lakshman; Sandeep Vettiyampadi
- Cinematography: Nithin K Raj
- Music by: Rhithik S Chand
- Production company: Dreamwest Global India Pvt. Ltd.
- Release date: 1 June 2018
- Country: India
- Language: Malayalam

Orange Valley is a 2018 Indian-Malayalam language thriller-drama film directed by RK DreamWest and starring Bibin Mathai, Diphul Mathew, Baiju Balan, Vandhitha Manoharan. Ala Lakshman and Mohan Ollur. Johnson Thankachan and George Varky produced the movie.

== Summary ==
Orange Valley tells the story of a young couple falling in love after an unexpected and short rendezvous. But their fate takes a sharp turn with the sudden intervention of a third person. It develops into an enchanting drama in the backdrop of the plight of poor plantation workers, trade union strikes, and the incursion of a revolutionary movement. People with their lives torn, still resilient and forgiving as the embodiments of love itself.

== Cast ==
- Bibin Mathai
- Diphul Mathew
- Baiju Balan
- Vandhitha Manoharan
- Mohan Ollur
- PN Ala Lakshman
- Sandeep Vettiyampadi
- Sabari Viswam

== Production ==
Dreamwest Global India Pvt. Ltd., a new entrant in film industry decided to launch themselves in film production with an all-new starcast film titled as Orange Valley. The primary cast was selected through audition and many members were chosen from ActLab Film and television Institute, Kochi, Kerala. Actor Bibin Mathai, who rose to fame with the short film Ente Hridayathinte Vadakku Kizhakke Attathu was signed to play a lead role. The principal photography of the film started on 14 November 2017 at Munnar and the film was completed in a 28 days single schedule. Ottapalam and Veli, Thiruvananthapuram are the other locations of the film.
