= Cuban Colony =

- Directed by: Manoj Varghese Parecattil
- Written by: Manoj Varghese Parecattil
- Screenplay by: Manoj Varghese Parecattil
- Produced by: Manoj Varghese Parecattil
- Starring: Able Benny; SreeRaj Vikram; Jino John; Gokul GK; Sreekanth Dasan; Aiswarya Unni
- Cinematography: Sinoy Ayappan
- Edited by: Jovin John
- Music by: Aloshya Kavumpurathu
- Production company: Haly Ann Group Production House
- Distributed by: Haly Ann Group Production House
- Release date: 6 July 2018
- Running time: 129 minutes
- Country: India
- Language: Malayalam

Cuban Colony is an Indian Malayalam language action comedy film written and directed by Manoj Varghese Parecattil, with Able Benny, Jino John, SreeRaj Vikram, Sreekanth Dasan, Gokul GK and Aiswarya Unni in lead roles under the banner of HalyAnnGroup. The film is predominantly set in Angamaly.

== Cast ==
- Jino John as Charli
- Sreekanth Dasan as Sambu
- Able Benny as Martin chako
- Aristo Suresh as Aristo
- Sreeraj vikram as Bibi
- Gk Gokul As Messi
- Manoj Varghese Parecattil As Anil
- Kripesh Kannan as Jango
- Aiswarya Unni as Anu Varghese
- Anagha as Mariya

== Music ==
The film score is composed, arranged by Aloshya Kavumpurathu and lyrics written by Hari Narayanan and Manoj Varghese Parecattil.

== Release ==
Cuban Colony was released on 6 July 2018 (India).
