= RK DreamWest =

Film Director

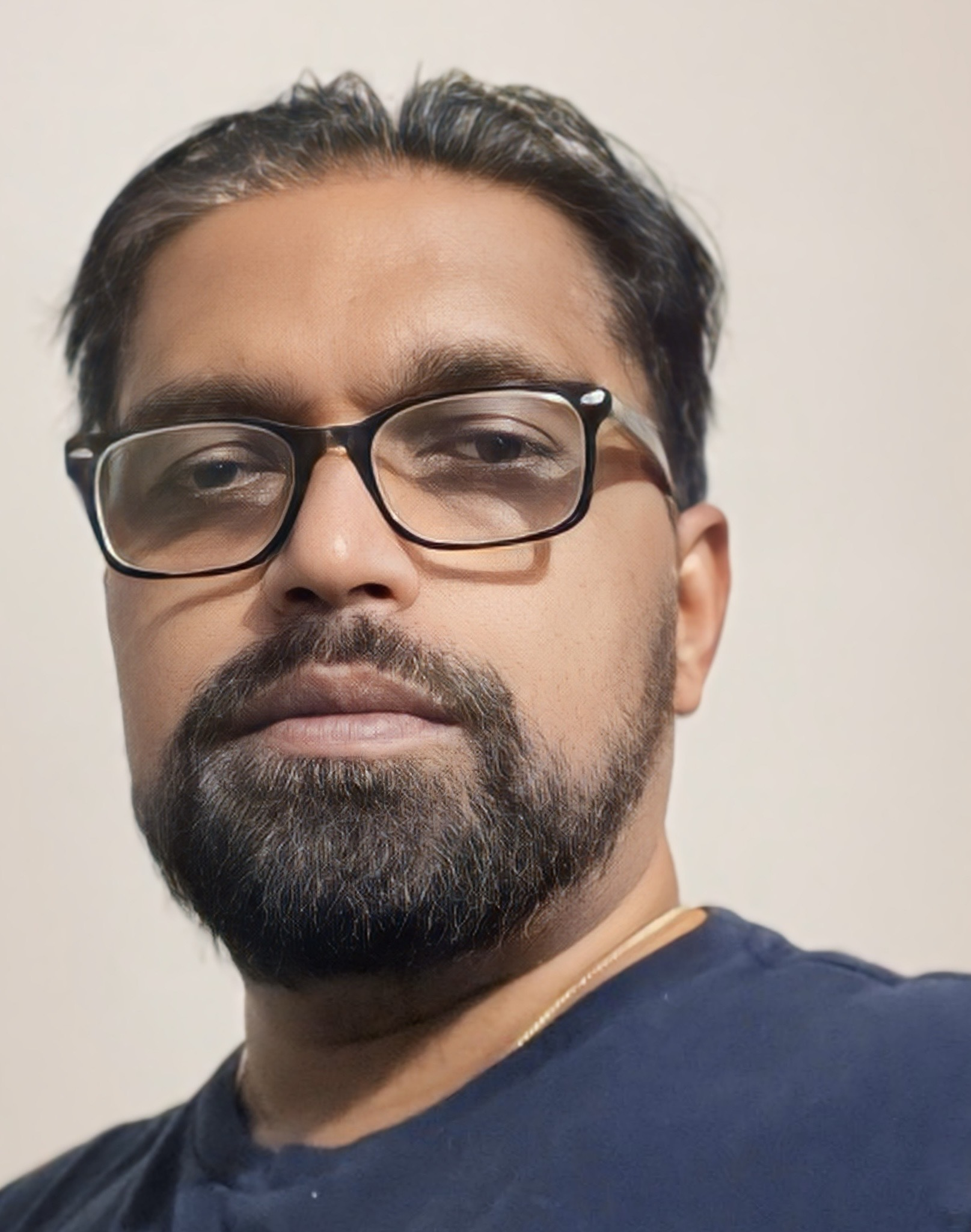
- Born: Radhakrishnan "RK" Nair; 6 April 1963 (age 63); Trivandrum, Kerala, India
- Education: University of Kerala, Trivandrum
- Occupations: Film director; Screenwriter; Cinematographer
- Years active: 2008–present
- Spouse: Radha G Nair (m. 1987; div. 2003)
- Children: 1

RK DreamWest is an Indian-American film director, screenwriter and cinematographer. He started his career in theater and directed several theater productions. Dreamwest made his feature film debut with Orange Valley under the banner of Dreamwest Global, followed by Fourth River.

== Personal life ==
DreamWest was born to Indian parents Appukuttan Nair and Bhavani Amma in Trivandrum, Kerala, India. He completed his master's degree from University of Kerala and started his career as an information technology professional. He married Radha G Nair in 1988 and the couple got divorced in 2003. They have a son Nandu Radhakrishnan. In 1998, DreamWest immigrated to the United States, and since 2001, he has lives with his family in Richmond, Virginia, United States of America.

== Career ==
In 2018 he debuted his first feature film, Orange Valley, under the banner Dreamwest Global. In 2020, he directed his second feature film, Fourth River, and released it on June 28, 2020.

== Filmography ==
Year	Film	Director	Screenwriter	Language	Notes
2020	Fourth River	Yes	Yes	Malayalam	1st Malayalam film to have a direct to OTT release.
2018	Orange Valley	Yes	Yes	Malayalam	
