= Avarkkoppam =

- Theatrical poster
- Directed by: Ganesh Nair
- Written by: Ajith Nair
- Starring: Bindu Kochunni; Parthasarathy Pillai; Nishad Joy; Sunny Kalluppara; Balu Menon; Valsa Thoppil; Rinta Roni; Shiny George; Tina Nair; Seven hundred Renil Radhakrishnan; Susy Mathew (Ruby); Amit Pullarkat; Arvind Padmanabhan; Lacy Alex; Lacy Alex; Radha Mukundan; Bindu Sundaran
- Cinematography: Manoj Nambiar
- Edited by: Lincen Raphel
- Music by: Giri Surya
- Production company: Thrippadi Creations
- Distributed by: Rishi Media
- Release date: 30 November 2018
- Running time: 140 minutes
- Country: India
- Language: Malayalam

Avarkkopam is a 2018 Malayalam film directed by Ganesh Nair and script by Ajith N Nair, starring Parthasarathy Pillai, Nishad Joy, Tina Nair, Sunny Kalluppara, valsa Thoppil, Susy Mathew (Ruby). Bindu Sundaran (Lisa Greenberg)

The film 'Avarkkoppam' featuring a central cast entirely of Malayali diaspora in the U.S. is an attempt to de-construct PTSD In life, there are pains and traumas that may be hard for others to empathise with. But a little care and support may go a long way to help alleviate the sufferings of the afflicted.

== Plot ==
"Avarkkoppam is a journey of three families residing in a tri-State area (Connecticut, New York and New Jersey) who go through traumatic events and face difficulties in coping with their displaced lives. However, with time and tender loving care (TLC), they get better. Receiving effective treatment after PTSD symptoms develop can be critical in reducing them and improving life functions",

== Cast ==
- Dr. Sani – Bindu Kochunni
- Dr. Ananthan – Parthasarathy Pillai
- Ben – Nishad Joy
- Kuriakose – Sunny Kalluppara
- Lisa Greenberg – Bindu Sundaran
- Dr. John – Balu Menon
- Bens Mom- Valsa Thoppil
- Nurse Rachel – Rinta Roni
- Rani – Shiny George
- Dr. Anita – Tina Nair
- Dr. Nancy Chacko – Susy Mathew (Ruby)
- Chacko – Arvind G. Padmanabhan
- Sophie Koshy – Ezhil Queen
- Dr. Roy – Ranil Radhakrishnan
- Dr. Tony – Amit Pullarkat
- Susan – Laisy Alex
- Annamma – Radhika Nettayi
- Radha Mukundan – Aliyamma
- Dr. Thommy – Francis Clement
- Father Paruthipara – Kochunni Kannannoor
- Nurse – Leena Thomas
- Hospital Receptionist-Jessica Philip
- Nurse – Joyce Joy

== Production ==
The production of the movie was done by Thrippadi Creations

=== Filming ===
The film was shot in the United States .
