= Samantharam =

Samantharam (Parallel)
- Directed by: John Sankaramangalam
- Screenplay by: John Sankaramangalam
- Story by: M. Sankaramangalam
- Starring: Soorya; Babu Namboothiri; Sai Das; Balan
- Cinematography: Prabhat Parida
- Music by: Jerry Amaldev
- Production company: Sudarshan International
- Release date: 1985
- Running time: 110 minutes
- Country: India
- Language: Malayalam

Samantharam (English: Equidistant) is a 1985 Malayalam film by John C. Sankaramangalam. Soorya, Babu Namboothiri, Sai Das and Balan play the lead roles.

== Cast ==
- Soorya as Susan
- Babu Namboothiri as Jose
- Sai Das as Mohan
- Balan as Varkey
