= Manoj Varghese Parecattil =

Indian film director and writer

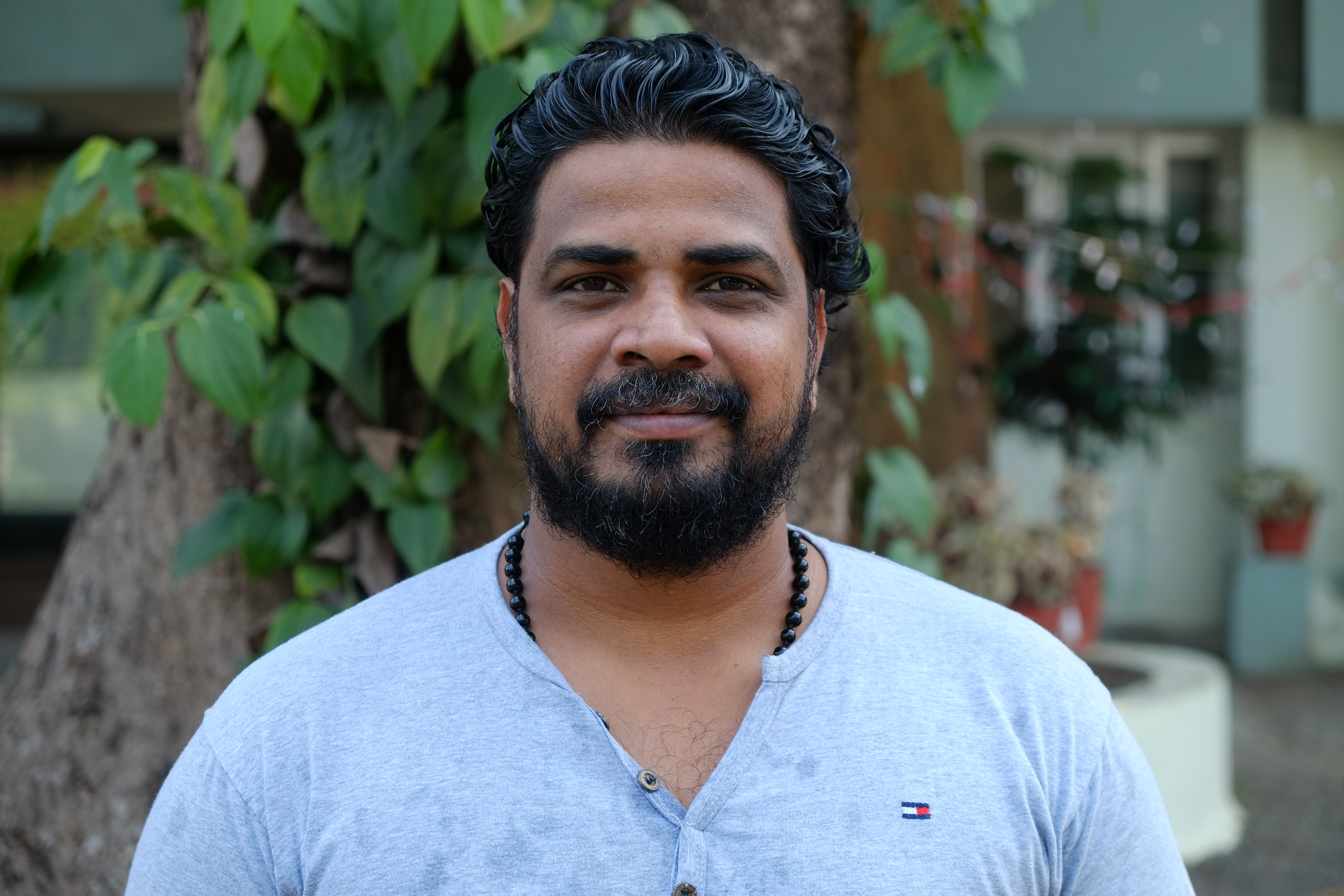
- Born: 27 August 1981 (age 44); Angamaly, Ernakulam, Kerala, India
- Occupations: Film director, writer
- Years active: 2014–present
- Awards: Best Director 2014 for short film 'FM – The Faceless Men' in First Cut Competition of Short films, Asianet Plus Channel

Manoj Varghese Parecattil is an Indian film director and writer, who works in Malayalam films. He made his directorial debut with Cuban Colony.

== Biography ==
Manoj Varghese was born to Varghese on 1981 at Angamaly, in Eranakulam district, in Kerala.

== Career ==
He started his career as a director in an advertising production house. Manoj Varghese was an independent short film maker and an assistant director in Malayalam film Industry. Manoj got award for Best Director 2014 for short film 'FM – The Faceless Men' in First Cut Competition of Short films, Asianet Plus Channel.

== Filmography ==
- Cuban Colony (2018)
- FM – The Faceless Men (2014) (short film)
