= Neha Saxena (film actress) =

Indian film actress

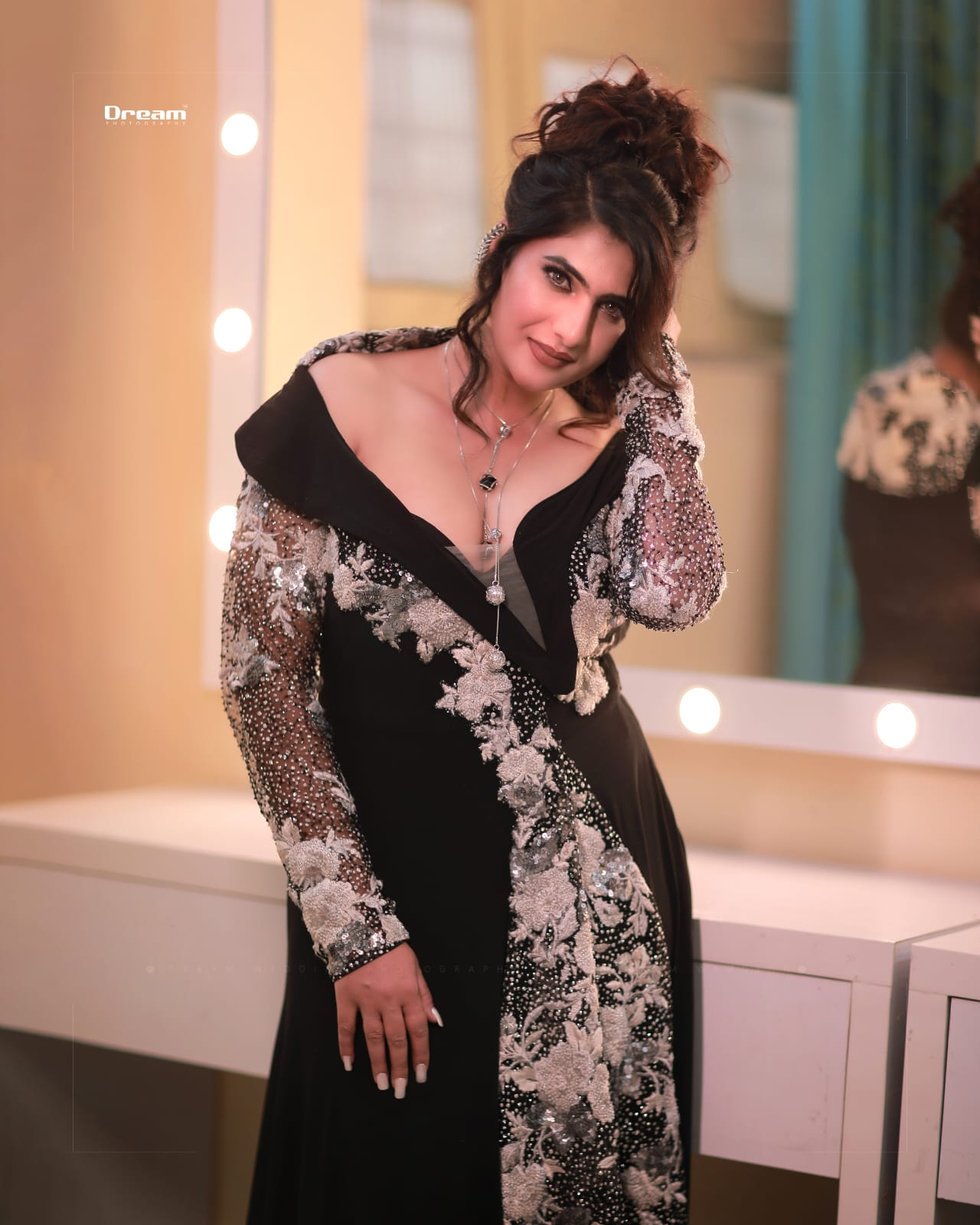
- A picture taken during a fashion shoot in 2022
- Born: Dehradun
- Occupation: Actress
- Years active: 2012–present
- Notable work: Kasaba, Sakhavinte Priyasakhi, Aaraattu

Neha Saxena is an Indian actress who appears in Malayalam, Tulu, Tamil, Telugu, Kannada and Hindi films. She is best known for her roles in the Malayalam films such as Kasaba with Mammootty and Munthirivallikal Thalirkkumbol, Aaraattu and Vrusshabha alongside Mohanlal.

She shared screen space with Saif Ali Khan in Chef (2017). She played the role of Mandakini in the Kannada soap opera HaraHara Mahadeva. She has also acted in a few Tamil, Telugu, Tulu, Sanskrit, and Bollywood films.

== Early life and background ==
Neha Saxena was born in Dehradun. She lost her father in an accident prior to her birth. Her mother Annu Saxena brought up her as a single parent. Prior to entering the movie industry, Neha Saxena has worked in the Aviation and Hotel Management industries. It was during her modeling days, she found interest in acting. Neha Saxena debuted into showbiz with the 2013 release Tulu movie Rickshaw Driver. The 2016 release Malayalam movie Kasaba was the major breakthrough in her career. She played a crucial role opposite Mammootty in the film. Later, she signed the Mohanlal starrer Munthirivallikal Thalirkkumbol. She can speak Punjabi, Hindi, English, Kannada, Telugu, Tamil, and Malayalam.

== Films ==
List of Neha Saxena film credits
| Year | Title | Role | Language | Notes |
|---|---|---|---|---|
| 2013 | Rickshaw Driver | Lawyer Anitha | Tulu | |
| 2014 | Bypass Road | | Kannada | |
| 2014 | Loduku Pandi | | Tamil | |
| 2014 | Just Love | Nandini | Kannada | |
| 2015 | Q Premaku Chavuku | Dona | Telugu | Bilingual film |
| 2015 | Q Preethigu Saavigu | Dona | Kannada | Bilingual film |
| 2015 | Kamlaa | Kamlaa | Hindi | Short film |
| 2016 | Liquid | | Kannada | |
| 2016 | One time | | Kannada | |
| 2016 | Dandu | | Kannada | |
| 2016 | Game | Sandhya | Kannada | Bilingual film |
| 2016 | Oru Melliya Kodu | Sandhya | Tamil | Bilingual film |
| 2016 | Yehi Wo Pyaar Hai | Kareena | Hindi | |
| 2016 | Kasaba | Susan | Malayalam | |
| 2017 | Munthirivallikal Thalirkkumbol | Julie | Malayalam | |
| 2017 | Nee Enna Maayam Seidhai | | Tamil | |
| 2017 | Chef | Neha | Hindi | Cameo |
| 2018 | Sakhavinte Priyasakhi | Rohini | Malayalam | |
| 2018 | Padayottam | Wedding guest | Malayalam | |
| 2019 | Jeem Boom Bhaa | Model Dolby | Malayalam | |
| 2019 | Operation Arapaima | Neha | Malayalam | |
| 2020 | Dhamaka | Lissie | Malayalam | |
| 2020 | Cochin Shadhi at Chennai 03 | Dr. Zareena Thomas | Malayalam | |
| 2020 | Ojas | DC Suma | Kannada | |
| 2021 | Lalbagh | Dr. Lakshmi | Malayalam | |
| 2021 | 48 Hours | Dr Sandra | Malayalam | |
| 2021 | Blood Moon | Pooja Sharma | Malayalam | |
| 2021 | 5 | Ann Mathew | Malayalam | |
| 2021 | Kondotty Pooram | IPS Subaida Aman | Malayalam | |
| 2021 | Late Marriage | Lead | Malayalam | |
| 2021 | Mricchakadikam | Aditi | Sanskrit | |
| 2021 | Lockdown | Ramya | Tamil | |
| 2022 | Salmon 3D | Kaal Bhairavi | Tamil | |
| 2022 | Aaraattu | Swapna/NIA Officer Arundhati Pathak | Malayalam | |
| 2022 | Operation Arapaima | Neha | Tamil | |
| 2023 | Lockdown Diarie | Ramya | Tamil | |
| 2024 | Peppatty | Sultana | Malayalam | |
| 2024 | Once Upon a Time in Kochi | ADGP Rani Patel | Malayalam | |
| 2024 | Daya Bharathi | | Malayalam | |
| 2025 | Vrusshabha | Yashodha | Telugu | Partially reshot in Malayalam |

Key
| † | Denotes films that have not yet been released |

== Television shows ==
List of Neha Saxena television credits
| Year | Show | Role | Language | Channel | Notes |
|---|---|---|---|---|---|
| 2016 | HaraHara Mahadeva | Mandakini | Kannada | Star Suvarna | Serial |
| 2017–2018 | Lal Salam | Dancer | Malayalam | Amrita TV | Talk show |
| 2017–2018 | Dare the Fear | Herself (participant) | Malayalam | Asianet | Reality show |
