= Avalalpam Vaikippoyi =

- Directed by: John Sankaramangalam
- Written by: Nagavally R. S. Kurup
- Screenplay by: Nagavally R. S. Kurup
- Produced by: United Producers
- Starring: Prem Nazir; Sheela; Jayabharathi; Adoor Bhasi
- Cinematography: Ashok Kumar
- Edited by: A. Ramesan
- Music by: G. Devarajan
- Production company: United Producers
- Distributed by: United Producers
- Release date: 14 January 1971
- Country: India
- Language: Malayalam

Avalalpam Vaikippoyi (English: She is a Little Late) is a 1971 Indian Malayalam-language film, directed by John Sankaramangalam and produced by United Producers. The film stars Prem Nazir, Sheela, Jayabharathi and Adoor Bhasi. G. Devarajan composed the music.

== Cast ==
- Prem Nazir
- Sheela
- Jayabharathi
- Adoor Bhasi
- Thikkurissy Sukumaran Nair
- Jose Prakash
- Prema
- Shobha
- Joy
- Alummoodan
- Amrith Vasudev
- Bahadoor
- Meena
- S. P. Pillai
- K. V. Shanthi
- Sujatha

== Soundtrack ==
The music was composed by G. Devarajan and the song lyrics were written by Vayalar Ramavarma.

No.	Song	Singers	Lyrics	Length (m:ss)
1	"Jeevithamoru Chumadu Vandi"	K. J. Yesudas	Vayalar Ramavarma	
2	"Kaattaruvi Kaattaruvi Koottukaari"	P. Susheela	Vayalar Ramavarma	
3	"Prabhaatha Chithraradhathilirikkum"	P. Madhuri	Vayalar Ramavarma	
4	"Varshameghame"	P. Susheela	Vayalar Ramavarma	
5	"Vellikkudakkeezhe"	K. J. Yesudas	Vayalar Ramavarma	
