= Askar Ali =

Indian actor

- Born: Askar Ali Khan
- Occupation: Actor
- Years active: 2017–present
- Relatives: Asif Ali (Brother)

Askar Ali is an Indian actor who works in Malayalam cinema. He made his debut with the film Honey Bee 2.5 (2017). He is the younger brother of Malayalam actor Asif Ali.

== Filmography ==
Key
†	Denotes films that have not yet been released

Year	Title	Role	Notes
2017	Honey Bee 2.5	Vishnu	
2017	Chembarathipoo	Vinod	
2018	Kamuki	Harikrishnan	
2019	Jeem Boom Bhaa	Basil Kanjikkuzhi	
2025	J.S.K – Janaki V v/s State of Kerala	CPO Firoz Mohammad	
2026	Sambhavam Adhyayam Onnu		
TBA	Njn Kanda Superman †	TBA	Delayed
