= List of Malayalam films of 2021 =

This is a list of Malayalam films that are scheduled to release in 2021.

== 2021 Highest grossing film in worldwide ==
- 1 Kurup - 81 crore
  2 Marakkar: Lion of the Arabian Sea - 47 crore
  3 Ajagajantharam - 11 crore

== January – March ==
*	Film released directly on OTT platform(s).

Opening		Title	Director	Cast	Production house	Ref	OTT
J A N U A R Y	1	Guardian	Satheesh Paul	Saiju Kurup, Mia George, Nayana Elza	Black Maria Productions, Prime Reels	Direct OTT release.	Prime Reels,
J A N U A R Y	8	Confessions of a Cuckoo	Jay Jithin	Durga Krishna, V. K. Prakash	Twenty Three Feet Entertainments, Prime Reels	Direct OTT release.	Neestream, Prime Reels
J A N U A R Y	12	Aathma	Vijayakumar K G	Mahima, Krishna Kumar, Sidharaj	Baywood Entertainment	Direct OTT release.	First Shows
J A N U A R Y	15	The Great Indian Kitchen	Jeo Baby	Suraj Venjaramoodu, Nimisha Sajayan	Mankind Cinemas, Symmetry Cinemas,	Direct OTT release.	Neestream
J A N U A R Y	22	Padmini	Susmesh Chandroth	Anumol, Irshad Sanju Sivram	TK Padmini Memorial Trust	Direct OTT release	CAVE India
J A N U A R Y	22	Vellam	Prajesh Sen	Jayasurya, Samyuktha Menon, Siddique	Friendly Productions		JioCinema, Sun NXT
J A N U A R Y	29	Vaanku	Kavya Prakash	Anaswara Rajan, Nandhana Varma, Gopika Ramesh, Meenakshi Unnikrishnan	Shimoga Creations, 7J Films and Trends Ad film makers		Neestream
J A N U A R Y	29	Eval Gopika	Ambalappuzha Radhakrishnan	Unni Rajesh, Nimisha Nair, Devan, Shobha Mohan	Davadas Film		
F E B R U A R Y	2	Akatho Puratho	Sudevan	Zachariah, Surabhi, Arun Lal	Pace Trust	Direct OTT Release	CAVE India
F E B R U A R Y	5	Changayi	Sudesh Kumar	Amal Sha, Bhagath Manuel	Avya Films		
F E B R U A R Y	12	Cricket	Sreejith Rajan	Laison John, Master Rahan, Sruthy, Manjula, Baby Dinapath	Thekkudan Pictures	Direct OTT release	High Hopes
F E B R U A R Y	12	Operation Java	Tharun Moorthy	Balu Varghese, Lukman, Vinayakan, Binu Pappu, Irshad, Mamitha Baiju, Sudhi Koppa, P. Balachandran, Alexander Prasanth, Dhanya Ananya	V Cinemas		ZEE5
F E B R U A R Y	12	Saajan Bakery Since 1962	Arun Chandu	Aju Varghese, K. B. Ganesh Kumar, Lena, Ranjita Menon	Funtastic Films		Amazon Prime
F E B R U A R Y	12	Yuvam	Pinku Peter Babu	Amith Chakalakkal, Abhishek Ravindran, Dayyana Hameed, Nirmal Palazhi, Nedumudi Venu	Once Upon A Time Productions		Neestream, Manorma Max
F E B R U A R Y	16	Deadline	Krishnajith S Vijayan	Kalasala Babu, Sasi Kalinga, Sunil Sukhada	Fireframes, White Dots Movies	Direct OTT release	Moviflex, Theater Play (on 1 June 2021)
F E B R U A R Y	19	Black Coffee	Baburaj	Baburaj, Lal, Sunny Wayne, Oviya, Shwetha Menon, Lena, Rachana Narayanankutty	Viswadeepthi Films		Manorama max
F E B R U A R Y	19	Drishyam 2	Jeethu Joseph	Mohanlal, Meena, Ansiba Hassan, Esther Anil	Aashirvad Cinemas, Amazon Prime.	Direct OTT release.	Amazon Prime
F E B R U A R Y	19	Aedan	Sanju Surendran	Abhilash Nair, George Kurian, Prasant, Nandini Sree, Sunny, Jojo George, Dileep Kumar	Aaj Films	Direct OTT Release	Cave OTT
F E B R U A R Y	19	Sahyadriyile Chuvanna Pookkal	Ajeesh Poovathoor	Nandu, Jayan Cherthala, Shivaji Guruvayoor	Goodwill Entertainments		
F E B R U A R Y	26	Ellom	Prasad Velachery	Jayan Cherthala, Ambika Mohan	Pullappallil Pictures		
F E B R U A R Y	26	Thirike	George Kora, Sam Xavier	George Kora, GopiKrishna Verma, Shanthi Krishna, namitha Krishnamurthy	Nationwide Pictures, Neestream	Direct OTT release.	Neestream
M A R C H	5	Sabu Ente Aniyan	Simmy Kailath	Simmy Kailath, Sylvia Kailath, Saarath Kochuparambil, Kiran Kothakuzhakal, Bluinse Thomas	Kailath Motion Pictures, Casetti Creatives		
M A R C H	10	Ice Orathi	Akhil Kavungal	Hareesh Peradi, Nirmal Palazhi, Neerja, Asha aravind	Punathil Productions, Prime Reels	Direct OTT release.	
M A R C H	11	The Priest	Jofin T. Chacko	Mammootty, Manju Warrier, Nikhila Vimal, Saniya Iyappan, Baby Monica	Anto Joseph Film Company RD Illuminations		Amazon Prime
M A R C H	11	Tsunami	Jean Paul Lal	Lal, Balu Varghese, Aradhya Ann, Mukesh, Innocent, Aju Varghese	Panda Dad Production		Neestream
M A R C H	12	Meezan	Jabbar Chemmad	Niyaaz Meccazreal, Anjali Nair, Anjana Menon, Chembil Asokan	Sam Varche Movie Production		Neestream
M A R C H	12	Varthamanam	Sidhartha Siva	Parvathy, Roshan Mathew, Dain Davis, Siddique	Benzy Productions		
M A R C H	17	Vrithakrithyilulla Chathuram	Krishand RK	Kochu Preman, Rahul Rajagopal, Jeevan Mammen, Saritha Kukkoo	Neelavelicham Studios, Krishand Films	Direct OTT release.	MX Player, Koode (on 5 June 2021)
M A R C H	18	Backpackers	Jayaraj	Kalidas Jayaram, Karthika Nair, Ranji Panicker	Prakriti Pictures, Roots Entertainment	Direct OTT release.	
M A R C H	19	Deira Diaries	Mushthaque Rahman Kairyaden	Abu Valayamkulam, Shalu Rahim	MJS Media, Neestream	Direct OTT release.	Neestream
M A R C H	19	Mohan Kumar Fans	Jis Joy	Kunchacko Boban, Anarkali Nazar, Sreenivasan, Siddique, Vinay Forrt, Mukesh, Ramesh Pisharody, KPAC Lalitha	Magic Frames		Amazon Prime
M A R C H	19	Ole Kanda Naal	Mustafa Gutz	Jothish jo, Krishnapriya, Ambro symon, Santhosh Keezhattur, Neena Kurupp, Sivaji	Gentrend Movies		
M A R C H	19	Insha	Dr. Siju Vijayan	Prarthana Sandeep, Mebin Issac, Suresh Nellikode, Rajeshwari Sashikumar	Ayushmithra Cinemas		Neestream
M A R C H	25	Kala	Rohith V. S.	Tovino Thomas, Divya Pillai	Juvis Productions, Adventure Company, Tovino Thomas Productions		Amazon Prime (limited territories), Saina Play (World Wide)
M A R C H	26	Aanum Pennum	Aashiq Abu; Jay K Venu ISC	Asif Ali, Parvathy, Darshana Rajendran, Indrajith Sukumaran, Nedumudi Venu, Joju George, Roshan Mathew, Samyuktha Menon	OPM Cinemas		Neestream, Saina Play
M A R C H	26	Biriyaani	Sajin Baabu	Kani Kusruthi, Anil Nedumangad, Surjith Gopinath, Shylaja Jala	U. A. N. Film House		
M A R C H	26	One	Santhosh Vishwanath	Mammootty, Nimisha Sajayan, Balachandra Menon, Murali Gopy, Salim Kumar, Gayathri Arun, Siddique, Joju George	Ichais Productions		NetFlix
M A R C H	26	Chiri	Joseph P Krishna	Joe John Chacko, Vishak Nair, Aneesh Gopal	Dream Box Production House	Direct OTT release.	
M A R C H	28	Innu Muthal	Rejjish Midhila	Siju Wilson, Indrans, Smrithi Sugathan	The Great Indian Cinemas	Direct OTT release.	ZEE5
M A R C H	28	Chachaji	M Hajamoinu	Abdul Rahim, Surabhi Lakshmi, Balaji Sharma	Family Cinemas, First Shows	Direct OTT release.	

== April – June ==
Opening		Title	Director	Cast	Production house	Ref	OTT
A P R I L	1	Aarkkariyam	Sanu John Varghese	Biju Menon, Parvathy, Sharafuddeen, Saiju Kurup	Moonshot Entertainments; OPM Cinemas Dream Mill		Amazon Prime, Neestream
A P R I L	1	Anugraheethan Antony	Prince Joy	Sunny Wayne, Gouri G. Kishan, Siddique, Indrans, Suraj Venjaramoodu, Shine Tom Chacko	Retconn Cinemas		Amazon Prime Video
A P R I L	1	Sarcas Circa 2020	Vinu Kolichal	Firoz Khan, Abhija Sivakala	Kad Cafe		
A P R I L	2	Irul	Naseef Yuzuf Izuddin	Fahadh Faasil, Soubin Shahir, Darshana Rajendran	Anto Joseph Film Company	Direct OTT release.	Netflix
A P R I L	4	Kaattinarike	Roy Karakkaattu	Ashokan, Fr Jose Puthenpurakkal, Sini Abraham	Cap Creations	Direct OTT release.	Prime Reels.
A P R I L	7	Joji	Dileesh Pothan	Fahadh Faasil, Baburaj, Basil Joseph, Shammi Thilakan	Bhavana Studios, Amazon Prime	Direct OTT release.	Amazon Prime
A P R I L	8	Nayattu	Martin Prakkat	Kunchacko Boban, Joju George, Nimisha Sajayan	Gold Coin Motion Pictures		Netflix
A P R I L	8	Chathurmukham	Ranjeeth Kamala Shankar	Manju Warrier, Sunny Wayne, Alencier Ley Lopez, Niranjana Anoop	First Print Studios		ZEE5
A P R I L	8	Appuvinte Sathyanveshanam	Sohan Lal	Master Ridhun, AV Anoop, Sudheer Karamana, Meera Vasudev, Sarayu, Maniyanpilla Raju, Neena Kurup	AVA Productions, E4 Entertainment	Direct OTT release.	Amazon Prime, Neestream
A P R I L	9	Nizhal	Appu N. Bhattathiri	Kunchacko Boban, Nayanthara, Divya Prabha, Rony David	Melanje Film House		
A P R I L	11	Krishnankutty Pani Thudangi	Sooraj Tom	Vishnu Unnikrishnan, Saniya Iyappan, Vijilesh Karayad, Dharmajan Bolgatty	Iffaar Media Raaffi Mathirra Peppercorn Studios	Direct OTT release.	ZEE5
A P R I L	13	Adbhutham	Jayaraj	Suresh Gopi, Mamta Mohandas, KPAC Lalitha	Roots entertainment	Censored in 2005. Direct OTT release.	
A P R I L	14	Kho-Kho	Rahul Riji Nair	Rajisha Vijayan, Mamitha Baiju, Venkitesh VP	First Print Studios		Amazon Prime, Saina Play
A P R I L	18	Wolf	Shaji Azeez	Arjun Ashokan, Samyuktha Menon, Shine Tom Chacko	Damor Cinema	Direct OTT release.	ZEE5
A P R I L	23	Orilathanalil	Ashok R Nath	Sreedharan, Kainakary Thankaraj, Shailaja Ambu	Sahasrara Films, First Shows	Direct OTT release.	
A P R I L	23	Ghost in Bethlehem	T S Arun Giladi	T S Arun Giladi, Sibi Thomas, Niranjan, Manikandan, Vineeth, Rudra	Arunodayam Creations, Limelight	Direct OTT release.	
A P R I L	23	Myth	M Sunil Kumar	Elavoor Anil, Baby Devi Shankari, Dileep Pallom	White Moon Movies, Limelight, HighHopes	Direct OTT release.	
A P R I L	24	Nalekkay	V K Ajith Kumar	Santhosh Keezhattoor, Sreelatha Namboothiri	Sooraj Sruthi Cinemas		
A P R I L	29	Thimiram	Shivaram Mony	KK Sudhakaran, Rachana Narayanankutty, Vishak Nair	Infinity Frames, Neestream	Direct OTT release.	Neestream
M A Y	14	Jackie Sherieef	Rafeeque Seelat	Kamil, Simna Shaji	Peepli Movies, Roots	Direct OTT release.	
M A Y	14	The Road	Rasheed Moideen	Akhil Prabhakar, Rinaz Yahya, Merin Maria	Cat 'n Rat Entertainment, High Hopes, Limelight	Direct OTT release.	
M A Y	19	Kachi	Binshad Nazar	Binu Pappu, Manohari Joy, Sreshta	PPJ Productions, NeeStream	Direct OTT release.	Neestream
M A Y	21	Edath Valath Thirinju	Prasad Nooranad	Arjun K, Bhagyalakshmi, Harsha Karthika	High Hopes, Limelight, First Shows	Direct OTT release.	
M A Y	21	Vishudha Rathrikal	S. Sunil	Anil Nedumangad, Sreejaya Nair, Alencier Ley Lopez	Pothoottan's Cinema, Saina Play	Direct OTT release.	Saina Play
M A Y	26	Jalasamadhi	Venu Nair	M S Bhaskar, Likha Rajan	Venu Nair Productions	Direct OTT release	Limelight
M A Y	28	The Last Two Days	Santhosh Lakshman	Deepak Parambol, Murali Gopi, Dharmajan Bolgatty, Aditi Ravi	Dharma Films	Direct OTT release	Neestream
M A Y	28	Sakshi	Surya Sundar	Vinod Guinness, Vidya Sreedhar, Aswani S Kumar, Ananthu S R, Aneesh P J	First Shows	Direct OTT release	First Shows
M A Y	28	Oath	P K Biju	P K Biju, Shajika Shaji, Preetha Pinarai, Davinchi Suresh	First Shows	Direct OTT release	First Shows
M A Y	28	Kammal	Aneesh	Aneesh, Minu Varghese	Roots	Direct OTT release	Roots
J U N E	4	Ameera	Riyas Muhammad	Meenakshi, Kottayam Ramesh, Boban Samuel	GWK Entertainments, First Shows, Limelight	Direct OTT release.	First Shows, Limelight
J U N E	10	Mathilukal : Love in the time of Corona	Anwar Abdulla	Anwar Abdulla	24/1 Independent Film Activities, Roots	Direct OTT release.	Roots
J U N E	12	Richter Scale 7.6	Jeeva K J	Murukan Martin, Ashokan Peringode	First Nation Combines, Roots, First Shows	Direct OTT release.	NeestreamRoots, First Shows
J U N E	17	Cheraathukal	Shajan Kallayi, Shanoob Karuvath, Fawaz Mohammad, Anu Kurishingal, Sreejith Chandran, Jayesh Mohan	Adil Ibrahim, Mareena Michael, Parvathi T.	Mampra Foundation	Direct OTT release.	Neestream & Simultaneous release through 10 OTT platforms.
J U N E	18	Kanakam Moolam	Saneesh Kunjukunju, Ahilash Ramachandran	Harris Mannancherry, Neena Kurup	Thirumadathil Films	Direct OTT release.	Roots
J U N E	18	Pranayamrutham	P. K. Radhakrishnan	Major Ravi, Adi Anichen, Suma Devi, Aarya, Mamukkoya, Sasi Kalinga, Neena Kurup	Devaparvam Movies	Direct OTT release.	First Shows, Limelight
J U N E	18	Puzhayamma	Vijeesh Mani	Baby Meenakshi, Thampi Antony, Linda Arsenio	Sree GokulamFilms	Direct OTT release.	JioCinema
J U N E	19	Grahanam	Anand Paga	Gibu George, Anand Paga, Devika Sivan, Sudheer Karamana, Vijay Menon	Sreenandiya Productions	Direct OTT release.	Neestream
J U N E	24	Kaadoram	Sajil Mampad	Ajay Saga, Ardra Krishna	Vision Entertainment	Direct OTT release.	Cave
J U N E	25	Enpathukalile Ebhyanmar	Shaji Yusuf	Nizam Yusuf, Ann Maria, Saju Kodiyan, Kulappulli Leela, Seema G. Nair	Shjahan Film International	Direct OTT release.	Roots
J U N E	30	Cold Case	Tanu Balak	Prithviraj Sukumaran, Aditi Balan, Lakshmi Priyaa Chandramouli, Athmiya Rajan, Suchitra Pillai	Anto Joseph Film Company, Plan J Studios	Direct OTT release.	Amazon Prime

== July - September ==
Opening		Title	Director	Cast	Production house	Ref	OTT
J U L Y	5	Sara's	Jude Anthany Joseph	Anna Ben, Sunny Wayne	Anantha Vision	Direct OTT release.	Amazon Prime
J U L Y	6	Velukkakka Oppu Kaa	Ashok R Klatha	Indrans, Uma, Saju Navodaya, Naseer Sankranthi	PJV Creations	Direct OTT release	Neestream, First Shows, Saina Play
J U L Y	9	Randuper	Prem Sankar	Basil Paulose, Santhy Balachandran, Suraj Venjaramood	Prayatna Films	Direct OTT release	Neestream, Sainaplay.
J U L Y	9	Ayisha Weds Shameer	Sikkandhar Dulkarnain	Manzur Muhammed, Nowmya Mallayya	Wama Entertainments	Direct OTT release	Multiple OTT platforms.
J U L Y	10	Thudi	Jomon George	Sugathan Master	Mecheri Movies	Direct OTT release	Roots
J U L Y	12	Swanam	Deepesh T	Master Abhinand, Ramya Raghavan, Santhosh Keezhattoor	Tullzi Films	Direct OTT release	Neestream
J U L Y	15	Mālik	Mahesh Narayanan	Fahadh Faasil, Nimisha Sajayan	AJ Film company	Direct OTT release	Amazon Prime
J U L Y	16	Domestic Dialogues	Vaishnav, Gokul	Akash, Amith Chandra, Kavya Prakash, Susha	Pimoca Tales	Direct OTT release	Roots
J U L Y	17	Chuzhal	Biju Maani	Jaffar Idukki, Nilja, Sanju Prabhakar Abin Mary	Nakshatra Pictures	Direct OTT release	Neestream
J U L Y	17	The Creator	Sabu Anthukaayi	Appani Sarath, Santhosh Keezhattoor, Megha Mathew	RHM Film	Direct OTT release	Sainaplay
J U L Y	21	Santhoshathinte Onnam Rahasyam	Don Palathara	Jitin Puthenchery, Rima Kallingal	Bee Cave Movies	Direct OTT release	Neestream & Multiple OTT platforms
J U L Y	21	Ali Imran	Sarshick Roshan	Anugraha Balakrishnan, Aneesh, Shaji p George, Prajina aralam, Siva prakash	S R Entertainment, Maliyekkal Media	Direct OTT release	Theatre Play
J U L Y	24	1956, Madhyathiruvithamkoor	Don Palathara	Assif Yogi, Jain Andrews, Krishnan Balakrishnan	Artbeat Studios	Direct OTT release	MUBI India
J U L Y	25	Bannerghatta	Vishnu Narayanan	Karthik Ramakrishnan, Asha Menon, Anoop, Sunil, Vinod	Copyright Pictures	Direct OTT Release	Amazon Prime
J U L Y	30	Otta	Benny C Daniel	Prasad Thrikkuttissery, Nimisha Unnikrishnan	Benseena Films	Direct OTT release	Zinea
J U L Y	30	Thampuran Paranja Katha	Deavn Nagalassery	Kala Vasudevan, Vygananda, Ramadevi	Rohini Productions	Direct OTT release	High Hopes
A U G U S T	1	Eighteen Hours	Rajesh Nair	Vijay Babu, Sudheer Karamana, Indu Thampy, Karthika P Kumar, Parthavi Vinod	Salil Sankaran	Direct OTT release	Manorama Max
A U G U S T	10	Neeravam	Ajay Sivaram	Parvathy Baul, Padmaraj Ratheesh, Madhu, Hareesh Peradi	Malhaar Movies	Direct OTT release	Multiple OTT platforms
A U G U S T	11	Kuruthi	Manu Warrier	Prithviraj Sukumaran, Roshan Mathew, Naslen K. Gafoor, Mamukoya, Shine Tom Chacko, Srindaa	Prithviraj Productions	Direct OTT release	Amazon Prime
A U G U S T	17	Kenjira	Manoj Kana	Vinusha Ravi, Koliyamma, Joy Mathew	Neru Films	Direct OTT release.	Neestream
A U G U S T	19	Home	Rojin Thomas	Indrans, Sreenath Bhasi, Deepa Thomas, Naslen K. Gafoor, Anoop Menon, Aju Varghese	Friday Film House	Direct OTT release	Amazon Prime
A U G U S T	19	Sayahnangalil Chila Manushyar	Praveen Sukumaran	Surjith Gopinath, Jijoy P.R	Agnostic Films	Direct OTT release	CAVE India
A U G U S T	20	Kaalchilambu	M. T. Annoor	Vineeth, Samvrutha Sunil, Mala Aravindan, Indrans, Sai Kumar	Yem Yem Films	Direct OTT release	Action Prime
A U G U S T	20	Oru Pappadavada Premam	Zayir Pathan	Zayir Patha, Niha Hussain, Kochu Preman	Uniwell Entertainments	Direct OTT release	Multiple OTT platforms
A U G U S T	21	Laughing Buddha	Niju Soman	Ramesh Pisharody, Aishwarya Lekshmi, Manju Pathrose	Chavara Films	TV premiere and OTT release	Amrita TV, Neestream, Jaiho OTT
A U G U S T	25	Ya Mone	Anwar Ali	Jawahar Ali Komban, Pramod Choorapra, Ihsan Ameen, Bilahari, Shilpa	Beryl Films	Direct OTT release.	Theatre Play
A U G U S T	26	Alice in Panchalinadu	Sudhin Vamattam	Kamya Ahlawat, Ajay Mathew, Shilpa Ajay, Anil Murali, Ponnamma Babu, KTS Padannayil	AICE Corporation, Barefoot	Direct OTT release	Amazon Prime (USA, UK) Neestream worldwide
A U G U S T	26	Kanthan	Shareef Easa	Daya Bai, Prajith, Chinnan	Rolling Pix Entertainment	Direct OTT release.	Action OTT
A U G U S T	27	Pidikittapulli	Jishnu Sreekandan	Sunny Wayne, Ahaana Krishna, Saiju Kurup, Baiju Santhosh	Sree Gokulam Movies	Direct OTT release.	JioCinema
A U G U S T	28	Tamara	Prakash Vadikkal	Aparna Nair, Prakash Chengal	Manniyath Films	Direct OTT release	Action Prime
A U G U S T	29	Pappantem Simontem Piller	Shijo Varghese	Narayanankutty, Pradeep Kottayam, Binu Adimali	Swis Tele Media	Direct OTT release.	Multiple OTT Platforms
A U G U S T	30	Swapnangalkkapuram	Prem R Nambiar	Divyadarshan, Santhosh Keezhattoor	P&G Cinemas	Direct OTT release.	Action Prime
S E P T E M B E R	9	Koora	Vaishag Jojan	Keerthi Anand, Varthik, Dhyan Dev	Jojan Cinemas	Direct OTT release.	Neestream, Sainaplay,
S E P T E M B E R	17	Kaanekkaane	Manu Ashokan	Tovino Thomas, Suraj Venjaramoodu, Aishwarya Lekshmi, Shruti Ramachandran	Dream Katcher	Direct OTT release.	Sony LIV
S E P T E M B E R	18	Piplantri	Shoji Sebastian	Miyasree, Rishi, Kavya Madhav, Rakesh, Jose Kallodi, Shelly Joy	Zickamore Film International, Pop Media	Direct OTT release	Neestream
S E P T E M B E R	22	Kaadakalam	Sakhil Raveendran	Davinchi Satheesh, Satheesh	Periyar Valley Creations	Direct OTT release	Amazon Prime (USA, UK) Neestream worldwide
S E P T E M B E R	23	Sunny	Ranjith Sankar	Jayasurya, Shritha Sivadas	Dreams N Beyond	Direct OTT release	Amazon Prime

== October - December ==
Opening		Title	Director	Cast	Production house	Ref	OTT
O C T O B E R	1	The Inmates	Baiju Thomas	Baiju Thomas, Alexander Jacob	Pen Cinema Company	Direct OTT release.	First Shows, bcineet
O C T O B E R	7	Bhramam	Ravi Chandran	Prithviraj Sukumaran, Unni Mukundan, Mamta Mohandas, Raashi Khanna	AP International	Direct OTT release (only in India).	Amazon Prime
O C T O B E R	8	Queen of Thonnakkal	Shyam Muralidharan	Madhupal, Maria Vincent, Sreejith, Vinod Thomas	Manorama	Direct OTT release	Manorama MAX
O C T O B E R	28	Erida	V. K. Prakash	Samyuktha Menon, Nassar, Dharmajan Bolgatty, Hareesh Peradi	Aroma Cinemas, Good Company, Trends Adfilm Makers	Direct OTT release	Amazon Prime
O C T O B E R	28	Vellakkarante Kamuki	Anis P S	Randev Sharma, Adwaitha Manoj, Anu Joseph, Aneesh Ravi, Jaffar Idukki	Aacharya Cinemas	Direct OTT release	Neestream, Jaiho OTT
O C T O B E R	29	Star	Domin D'Silva	Prithviraj Sukumaran, Joju George, Sheelu Abraham, Jaffar Idukki	Abaam Movies		Amazon Prime
O C T O B E R	29	Cabin	Pulari Basheer	Prince Ootty, Kailash, Jaffar Idukki, Joy Mathew, Ronna Joe, Shiyas Kareem	Lysa Productions		
O C T O B E R	29	99 Crime Diary	Sinto Sunny	Sreejith Ravi, Gayathri Suresh	Jibu Jacob Entertainments		Saina Play
O C T O B E R	29	Thinkalazhcha Nishchayam	Senna Hegde	Anagha Narayanan, Aishwarya Suresh, Ajisha Prabhakaran, Anuroop P, Rajesh Madhavan, Unni Raja	Pushkar Films	Direct OTT release	SonyLIV
N O V E M B E R	5	Mission-C	Vinod Guruvayoor	Kailash, Appani Sarath, Major Ravi, Meenakshi Dinesh	Meppadan Films		
N O V E M B E R	12	Kanakam Kaamini Kalaham	Ratheesh Balakrishnan Poduval	Nivin Pauly, Grace Antony, Vinay Forrt, Vincy Aloshious	Pauly Jr. Pictures	Direct OTT release	Disney+ Hotstar
N O V E M B E R	12	Kurup	Srinath Rajendran	Dulquer Salmaan, Indrajith Sukumaran, Sunny Wayne, Bharath, Sobhita Dhulipala	Wayfarer Films		Netflix
N O V E M B E R	19	Aaha	Bibin Paul Samuel	Indrajith Sukumaran, Amith Chakalakkal, Santhy Balachandran, Manoj K. Jayan	Zsazsa Productions		Zee5
N O V E M B E R	19	Ammachi Koottile Pranayakalam	Rasheed Palluruthy	Kaviyoor Ponnamma, Sheela, Saju Navodaya, Sameena, Sathar Sulaiman	Cochin Mehandi Films, High Hopes Film Factory		High Hopes OTT
N O V E M B E R	19	Churuli	Lijo Jose Pellissery	Joju George, Chemban Vinod Jose, Vinay Forrt, Jaffar Idukki	Movie Monastery, Chembosky Motion Pictures	Direct OTT release	Sony LIV
N O V E M B E R	19	Ellam Sheriyakum	Jibu Jacob	Asif Ali, Rajisha Vijayan, Siddique, Kalabhavan Shajon	Thomas Thiruvalla Films, Dr. Paul's Entertainment		Zee5
N O V E M B E R	19	Jan.E.Man	Chidambaram	Basil Joseph, Arjun Ashokan, Lal, Ganapathi, Balu Varghese	Cheers Entertainment		Sun NXT
N O V E M B E R	19	Lalbagh	Prasanth Murali	Mamta Mohandas, Rahul Madhav, Sijoy Varghese, Neha Saxena	Vega Entertainment		Zee5
N O V E M B E R	19	No Man's Land	Jishnu Harindra Varma	Sudhi Koppa, Lukman Avaran, Sreeja Das	Buddha Corner Films	Direct OTT release	Amazon Prime
N O V E M B E R	21	Kalakaran	AJ Kalabhavan	Saju Navodaya, K. T. S. Padannayil, Kalabhavan Rahman, Vismaya KP	Gadsmene Productions	Direct OTT release	Multiple OTT Platforms
N O V E M B E R	25	Kaaval	Nithin Renji Panicker	Suresh Gopi, Renji Panicker, Rachel David, Muthumani, Suresh Krishna	Goodwill Entertainments		Netflix
N O V E M B E R	25	My Lucky Number is Black	Atmabodh	Adhitya Jino, Meera, Suresh Saraswathy, Janardhanan Karivellur	Lalithambika Productions	Direct OTT release	Neestream
N O V E M B E R	26	Bodhodayam	Janardhanan Karivellur	Adhitya Jino, Meera, Suresh Saraswathy, Janardhanan Karivellur	Showtime Creations		
N O V E M B E R	27	Ottachodyam	Anish Urumbil	Renji Panicker, Binoj Vilya, Achu, Neha, Muralidharan	A&B Creations	Direct OTT release	CAVE India OTT
N O V E M B E R	29	Second Option	Sujish Sreedhar	Swetha Raghunath, Suresh Narayanan, Reviddanesh, Shankaran Namboothiri	Great Ambition Films	Direct OTT release	Koode
D E C E M B E R	2	Marakkar Arabikadalinte Simham	Priyadarshan	Mohanlal, Pranav Mohanlal, Arjun Sarja, Sunil Shetty, Ashok Selvan, Kalyani Priyadarshan, Keerthy Suresh, Manju Warrier	Aashirvad Cinemas		Amazon Prime
D E C E M B E R	2	Devalokha	Shanoob Karuvath	Mathew Mampra, Rajeev Pillai, Mariam Joseph	Rivertale Media	Direct OTT release	Neestream
D E C E M B E R	3	Bheemante Vazhi	Ashraf Hamza	Kunchako Boban, Chemban Vinod Jose, Chinnu Chandni	OPM Cinemas		Amazon Prime
D E C E M B E R	10	Kshanam	Suresh Unnithan	Bharath, Ajmal Ameer Raji Thampi, Baiju Santhosh, Lal	Deshaan Movie Factory, Roshan Pictures		
D E C E M B E R	10	Muddy	Dr. Pragabhal	Yuvan, Ridhaan Krishna, Anusha Sooraj, Amith Sivadas Nair, Renji Panicker, Sunil Sukhada, Shobha Mohan, Manoj Guinness, Hareesh Peradi	PK7 Creations		Amazon Prime
D E C E M B E R	10	Oru Canadian Diary	Seema Sreekumar	Paul Paulose, Pooja Maria Sebastian, Simran	Sreem Productions		
D E C E M B E R	10	Sumesh and Ramesh	Sanoop Thykoodam	Sreenath Bhasi, Balu Varghese, Praveena, Salim Kumar	Whitesands Media House Production, KL7 Entertainments		Sun NXT
D E C E M B E R	10	Udumbu	Kannan Thamarakkulam	Senthil Krishna, Hareesh Peradi, Alencier Ley Lopez, Sajal Sudarshan, Angelina Livingston, Yami Sona	KT Movie House, 24 Motion Films		
D E C E M B E R	17	Michael's Coffee House	Anil Philip	Dheeraj Denny, Renji Panicker, Margret Antony, Jins Bhaskar, Pradeep Kottayam	Angamaly Films		
D E C E M B E R	17	Kannalan	Kumar Nanda	Sreejith Ravi, Rajesh Sharma, Ashwati Chinnu, Malathi Teacher	360 Degree Pictures	Direct OTT release.	Multiple OTT platforms
D E C E M B E R	17	Kakkaponnu	Dinesh Gopalsamy	Anu Joseph, Meenakshi Anoop, Rajesh Hebbar	Candle Light Media		
D E C E M B E R	17	Vellaramkunnile Vellimeenukal	Kumar Nanda	Bhagath Manuel, Shanthi Krishna, Anand Surya, Kochu Preman, Sasi Kalinga, Murali, Prajusha, Baby Gaurinanda, Master Gautam Nanda, Sunil Sukhada	AGS Movie Makers		
D E C E M B E R	23	Ajagajantharam	Tinu Pappachan	Antony Varghese, Arjun Ashokan, Chemban Vinod Jose	Silver Bay Studios		Sony LIV
D E C E M B E R	23	Chirath	Rema Sajeevan	Anna Angel, Sandhya, Saju Koothattukulam, Unnithanoor, Unnikrishnan, Vasantha Kumari	Art Point Creations	Direct OTT release.	Mainstream TV, Limelight
D E C E M B E R	23	Pala Pootha Raavil	Mohan Manamkutti	Sreekumar, Shameer, Mahidas, Sneha Chithirai, Greeshma	Abhaya Chicku Creations	Direct OTT release	Theatre Play
D E C E M B E R	24	Madhuram	Ahammed Kabeer	Joju George, Arjun Ashokan, Nikhila Vimal, Shruti Ramachandran, Indrans, Jaffar Idukki	Appu Pathu Pappu Production House	Direct OTT release.	Sony LIV
D E C E M B E R	24	Meow	Lal Jose	Soubin Shahir, Mamta Mohandas, Salim Kumar	Thomas Thiruvalla Films, LJ Films		Amazon Prime, Simply South
D E C E M B E R	24	Mickey	Jino Joseph	Nandu, Jaffar Idukki, Surabhi Lakshmi, Master Vishnu	SDB Communications	Direct OTT release	Multiple OTT platforms
D E C E M B E R	24	Minnal Murali	Basil Joseph	Tovino Thomas, Guru Somasundaram, Harisree Ashokan, Femina George, Shelly Kishore, Arya Salim	Weekend Blockbusters	Direct OTT release.	Netflix
D E C E M B E R	24	Kolaambi	T. K. Rajeev Kumar	Nithya Menen, Renji Panicker, Dileesh Pothan, Manju Pillai, Siddharth Menon, Rohini, Baiju Santhosh	Nirmalyam Cinema	Direct OTT release	MTalkie Cinema
D E C E M B E R	24	Kunjeldho	Mathukkutty	Asif Ali, Vineeth Sreenivasan, Rekha, Jasnya Jayadeesh, Gopika Udayan, Siddique	Little Big Films		ZEE5
D E C E M B E R	24	Vari:The Sentence	Sreejith Poyilkaavu	Santhosh Keezhattoor, Sajitha Madathil, Rachna Ravindra Shelar, Sunil Sukhada, Sreejith Ravi, Prakash Chengal, Unni Raj	Hassans Family, Thanneer Films	Direct OTT release	Neestream
D E C E M B E R	30	Vidhi: The Verdict	Kannan Thamarakkulam	Dharmajan Bolgatty, Anoop Menon, Manoj K. Jayan, Sheelu Abraham, Sarayu Mohan, Senthil Krishna, Noorin Shereef	Abaam Movies, Swarnalaya Cinemas		Sun NXT
D E C E M B E R	31	Djibouti	S. J. Sinu	Amith Chakalakkal, Dileesh Pothan, Anjali Nair, Shagun Jaswal, Jacob Gregory, Biju Sopanam, Sunil Sukhada	Nile & Blue Hill Motion Pictures		Amazon Prime
D E C E M B E R	31	Keshu Ee Veedinte Nadhan	Nadirshah	Dileep, Naslen K. Gafoor, Urvashi, Vaishnavi Venugopal, Anusree, Kalabhavan Shajon, Kottayam Nazeer, Jaffar Idukki, Ganapathi S Poduval	Naad Group, United Global Media Entertainment	Direct OTT release	Disney+ Hotstar
D E C E M B E R	31	Oru Thathvika Avalokanam	Akhil Marar	Joju George, Niranj Maniyanpilla Raju, Shammi Thilakan, Major Ravi, Aju Varghese, Suraj Venjaramoodu	Yohan Productions		Amazon Prime
