= Aadu =

Aadu may refer to:

- Aadu (franchise), an Indian film franchise
  - Aadu (film), a 2015 Indian Malayalam-language film
  - Aadu 2, 2017 sequel
  - Aadu 3: One Last Ride - Part 1, 2025 sequel
- Aadu (name), an Estonian male given name

== See also ==
- Aadu Puli Attam (disambiguation)
