= Aadu (film series) =

Indian film series

- Created by: Midhun Manuel Thomas
- Owner: Friday Film House

Films and television
- Film(s): Aadu (2015); Aadu 2 (2017); Aadu 3 (2026); Aadu 3: The Ride Ends - Part 2 (TBA)

Aadu is an Indian film series of Malayalam-language films created by Midhun Manuel Thomas and produced by Friday Film House. The series follows the misadventures of Shaji Pappan and his quirky gang in the Idukki hills, where the gang's fate is intertwined with the other main characters, which results in a comedy mess each time.

The first in the series was Aadu (2015), which was centered around a goat named "Pinky" which Shaji and his team won as a prize in a tug-of-war tournament and the chaos caused because of it.

The second installment in the series, Aadu 2 (2017) is based on the 2016 Indian banknote demonetisation, where Shaji and his gang accidentally receive a note-printing design mistaking it for a medicine and the search for it by various people forms the crux of the story.

The third installment, Aadu 3 (2026), is the first part of a two-part duology within the franchise. The film spans across three timelines, AD 1790 (past), 2025 AD (present) and 2370 AD (future) and how events in one timeline reach to Shaji Pappan and his gang. which released on 19 March 2026.

The franchise is to be concluded by Aadu 3: The Ride Ends - Part 2 (TBA).

== Feature films ==
| Film | Released | Director | Writer | Studio(s) | Installments | Ref. |
|---|---|---|---|---|---|---|
| Aadu | 6 February 2015 | Midhun Manuel Thomas | Midhun Manuel Thomas | Friday Film House | First Installment | |
| Aadu 2 | 22 December 2017 | Midhun Manuel Thomas | Midhun Manuel Thomas | Friday Film House | Second Installment | |
| Aadu 3 | 19 March 2026 | Midhun Manuel Thomas | Midhun Manuel Thomas | Friday Film House, Kavya Film Company | Third Installment, first part of a two-part film. | |

=== Aadu (2015) (Note: Aadu original title is "Aadu Oru Bheekara Jeeviyanu" (transl. Goat is a mysterious creature).) ===
A local Tug-of-war tourney gifted Shaji Pappan and his gang, a cute but naughty little goat called 'Pinky'. Their attempts to dump the goat, unknowingly, interrupts few groups of smugglers, who are in race for the 'Neelakodiveli'. (Note: Aadu is the first Malayalam film to introduce Intro/Theme music to all major characters.)

=== Aadu 2 (2017) ===
Shaji Pappan and his gang try to redeem their arts club through a game of tug-o-war. Meanwhile, Pappan's back pain has become a bigger problem, so they orders an Ayurvedic medicine from North India. Chaos erupts when Pappan and his gang miscarries the counterfeit note design thinking as Medicine for his back pain. As the half-witted gang gets entangled in a bigger conspiracy. (Note: Aadu 2 is based on 2016 demonetisation which was to curb Black money and to stop counterfeit notes.)

=== Aadu 3 (2026) ===
In Aadu 3: One Last Ride - Part 1, Shaji Pappan and his legendary gang from the High Range return for a chaotic adventure that unexpectedly shatters the boundaries of time and logic. What begins as a signature "Aadu" style scramble for a mysterious object quickly escalates into a mind-bending historical fantasy, bridging the gap between a 1700s royal conflict involving Maharaja Padmanabha Thampuran ("Past version of Shaji Pappan") and a high-stakes struggle in the present day. As the lines between ancestors and their modern-day descendants blur, the gang finds themselves caught in a sprawling "temporal loop" where every slapstick mishap could rewrite history itself. The film serves as a massive, visually ambitious setup for a grand conclusion, leaving audiences balanced on a cliffhanger that questions if Shaji Pappan's luck can survive a battle across centuries.

== Additional crews ==
| Film | Producer(s) | Cinematographer | Music | Editor |
|---|---|---|---|---|
| Aadu | Vijay Babu, Sandra Thomas | Vishnu Narayanan | Shaan Rahman | Lijo Paul |
| Aadu 2 | Vijay Babu | Vishnu Narayanan | Shaan Rahman | Lijo Paul |
| Aadu 3 | Vijay Babu, Venu Kunnappilly | Akhil George | Shaan Rahman, Dawn Vincent | Lijo Paul |

== Main cast and characters ==
| Character | Films | | |
| Character | Aadu (2015) | Aadu 2 (2017) | Aadu 3 (2026) |
|---|---|---|---|
| Shaji Pappan | Jayasurya | Jayasurya | Jayasurya |
| Arakkal Abu | Saiju Kurup | Saiju Kurup | Saiju Kurup |
| SI Sarbath Shameer | Vijay Babu | Vijay Babu | Vijay Babu |
| Saathan Xavier | Sunny Wayne | Sunny Wayne | Sunny Wayne |
| DUDE | Vinayakan | Vinayakan | Vinayakan |
| Captain Sachin Cleetus | Dharmajan Bolgatty | Dharmajan Bolgatty | Dharmajan Bolgatty |
| Kuttan Moonga | Vineeth Mohan | Vineeth Mohan | Vineeth Mohan |
| Krishnan Mandaram | Bhagath Manuel | Bhagath Manuel | Bhagath Manuel |
| Lolan | Harikrishnan | Harikrishnan | Harikrishnan |
| Bastin Pathrose | Unni P. Dev | Unni P. Dev | Unni P. Dev |
| P.P Sasi Aashan | Indrans | Indrans | Indrans |
| Kanjavu Soman | Sudhi Koppa | Sudhi Koppa | Sudhi Koppa |
| Ponnappan | Aju Varghese | Aju Varghese | Aju Varghese |
| Mary | Srinda | Srinda | Srinda |
| Battery Simon | Biju Kuttan | Biju Kuttan | Biju Kuttan |
| Dragon Paili | Nelson Sooranad | Nelson Sooranad | Nelson Sooranad |
| Thomas Pappan | Renji Panicker | Renji Panicker | Renji Panicker |
| High Range Hakkim | Chemban Vinod Jose | | |
| Constable Pavithran | Pradeep Kottayam | Pradeep Kottayam | |
| Kaippuzha Kunjappan | | Vineeth Thattil David | Vineeth Thattil David |
| Kuttan Moosa | | | Krishna Jeev |
| Kate Lara | | | Alleya Bourne |

== Music ==
Shaan Rahman composed the soundtracks and film scores for entire Aadu franchise.
