= Uriyadi (2020 film) =

2020 film by A.J. Varghese

- Theatrical release poster
- Directed by: A.J. Varghese
- Written by: Dinesh Damodar
- Produced by: Naizam Salam; Sudheesh Sankar; Rajesh Narayanan
- Starring: Sreenivasan; Siddique; Vineeth Mohan; Manasa Radhakrishnan; Aju Varghese
- Cinematography: Jemin Jom Ayyaneth
- Edited by: Karthik Jogesh
- Music by: Ishaan Dev
- Production companies: Friends Film Factory; Fifty Six Cinemas
- Distributed by: Silver Sky Productions
- Release date: 17 January 2020
- Running time: 136 minutes
- Country: India
- Language: Malayalam

Uriyadi is a Malayalam-language thriller comedy-drama film directed by A.J Varghese. The film stars Sreenivasan, Siddique, Vineeth Mohan, Baiju Santhosh, Aju Varghese and others, where Karthik Jogesh is the editor, the cinematography is by Jemin J Ayyaneth, while the original score and soundtrack are composed by Ishaan Dev. The film was released on 17 January 2020.

== Cast ==
- Sreenivasan as Additional SI Padmanabhan Pilla / Pappettan
- Siddique as SI Ravikumar
- Indrans as Head Constable Panchavarnaksharan Pilla
- Aju Varghese as Ambili
- Sudhi Koppa as Fireman Mrithul
- Manasa Radhakrishnan as Renuka Ravikumar
- Vineeth Mohan as Rahul Ravikumar
- Baiju Santhosh as CI Mathew Stephen
- Sreejith Ravi as Gunman Subair
- Prem Kumar as Balaraman, Home Minister of Kerala
- Sreelakshmi as Kavitha Ravikumar
- Arya as Constable Shiny Mathayi
- Sethu Lakshmi as Bavani Amma
- Bijukuttan as Rajanikanth Vedivecham kovil
- Raj Kiran Thomas as Alexander Idicula IPS, City Police Commissioner-Trivandrum
- Viji as Saira, Subair's wife
- Balaji Sarma as News Reader Arvind Aasamyi
- Parvathi Shon
- Kalyani Nair
- Pradeep Kottayam
- Noby Marcose
- Azeez Nedumangad as Uthaman

== Production ==
Principal photography began on 30 November 2018 at Police Headquarters, Thiruvananthapuram, Kerala. And the audio launch was conducted at the capital city of Kerala
