= Sunny (2021 film) =

2021 film by Ranjith Shankar

- Official release poster
- Directed by: Ranjith Sankar
- Written by: Ranjith Sankar
- Produced by: Ranjith Sankar; Jayasurya
- Starring: Jayasurya; Shritha Sivadas
- Cinematography: Madhu Neelakandan
- Edited by: Shameer Muhammed
- Music by: Sanker Sharma
- Production company: Dreams N Beyond Production
- Distributed by: Amazon Prime Video
- Release date: 23 September 2021
- Running time: 94 minutes
- Country: India
- Language: Malayalam

Sunny is a 2021 Indian Malayalam-language psychological drama film written and directed by Ranjith Sankar. The film is jointly produced by Ranjith Shankar and Jayasurya under the banner of Dreams N Beyond Productions.

This is Jayasurya's 100th film and it was released through Amazon Prime Video on 23 September 2021. The film received widespread critical acclaim as a unique single act movie falling in the feel good genre. The film was selected under Indian Panorama section in IFFI, IFFK and various other international festivals. Jayasurya won the Best Actor Award for portraying the title character Sunny at the prestigious Dhaka International Film Festival.

== Plot ==
Sunny lands at Cochin International Airport and heads to Grand Hyatt Kochi for quarantine. On the way, he burns his passport and throws it out of the car. The cab driver asks him why, but Sunny says nothing to worry. In the hotel, he takes the most luxurious suite, where A. R. Rahman himself has once stayed. He calls his friend Kozhi Rajesh and says this is his new number. Rajesh asks him how he caa afford a luxurious suite because the last time he heard about Sunny was that Sunny is in financial difficulties. Sunny replies that his financial woes are over.

He spends the entire first day drinking and finishes the bottle he had. The next day he desperately needs another one, but Rajesh said that the hotel will not entertain that. His cab driver also turns down his request. Sunny gets a call from SI Sadashivan Nair asking about his whereabouts, but desperate Sunny ends up asking the SI for a bottle of liquor. The SI instead refers him to a counselor, Doctor Eerali, who calls him later in the day and starts counselling him.

During the conversations, it is reveled that Sunny married his childhood love Nimmi and is now going through a divorce. He reveals to Doctor Eerali that his first child died hours after birth and he moved to Abu Dhabi to get over the grief. There, he started having another affair, and that is the reason for his divorce. Nimmi is now eight months pregnant and she wants to have the flat they jointly own in Kochi.

A money lender named Jacob starts calling Sunny and begins to threaten him because Sunny owes him a large amount. Sunny, with the help of his advocate Paul, manages to negotiate with Baiju, the guy who cheated Sunny and gets 30% of the money that Baiju cheated Sunny out of. Sunny asks the advocate to give that money to Jacob and settle the issues.

Initially, Sunny was suicidal and his plan was to commit suicide and give his insurance money to Jacob, but Doctor Eerali talks him out of it through his counselling. Sunny starts liking the doctor, but the doctor passes away from a cardiac arrest.

One day Sunny finds a dupatta in his balcony and he gets to know that it is of Aditi, who is also in quarantine, living in the suite just above. They start talking due to their boredom. Few days later, Aditi's RT-PCR results come, and she is COVID negative. She leaves for home while Sunny gets a glimpse of her while she was going down in an elevator.

The next day Sunny's RT-PCR result arrives; he is Covid positive. Since he has low BP, the SI asks him to shift to the hospital. That day Nimmi gets admitted to the hospital for delivery. While Sunny is on the way to the hospital, he gets a call from Nimmi, who says their newborn son wants to see his daddy and the movie ends happily.

== Cast ==
- Jayasurya a Sunny
- Innocent as Doctor Eerali, Psychologist
- Shritha Sivadas as Adithi (voiceover by Shruti Ramachandran), Sunny's neighbour
- Sshivada as Nimmi, Sunny's wife
- Mamta Mohandas as Dr. Anuradha, Sunny's ex - girlfriend
- Vijay Babu as Advocate Paul, Sunny's lawyer
- Vijayaraghavan as SI Sadashivan Nair
- Siddique as Jacob, Moneylender
- Aju Varghese as Kozhi Rajesh, Sunny's bestfriend

== Production ==
=== Development ===
It was a very big dream of Ranjith Shankar to do a single character film which explores the humanistic aspects. During the national lockdown due to COVID-19 pandemic, in March 2020, he started writing the script for the film. It took about six months for him to polish and finish the script. Ranjith approached Jayasurya with the script. Even though he liked the theme and the script, he was not confident about the character. When Ranjith was about to announce the film with another actor, Jayasurya contacted him and agreed to play the character, Sunny.

=== Pre-production ===
The film was announced by Jayasurya through his official social media account on 6 November 2020.

=== Filming ===
The shooting of the film began in November 2020 at the Grand Hyatt Kochi.

=== Post-production ===
The post production works of the film was completed in February 2021.

== Marketing ==
Jayasurya and Ranjith released the teaser trailer of the film through their social media accounts on 26 November 2020. The trailer of the movie was released on 20 September 2021.

== Release ==
The film was released through Amazon Prime Video on 23 September 2021. It was screened at 52nd International Film Festival of India in 'Indian Panorama' section, feature film category in November 2021.

== Reception ==
Majority of the critics were highly positive of the film.

Firstpost gave a 3 star rating for the movie and wrote that, "Sunny movie is surprisingly engaging despite a one-man-one-space format" and also added that, "The subject and presentation are challenging, but the director pulls it off at a crisp 1 hour and 33 minutes running time with the aid of thoughtful writing and a leading man in impeccable form."

S. R. Praveen of The Hindu wrote that, "Though Jayasurya somehow manages to keep the interest alive and the soaring background score at key points, the script is such that the film itself never soars above the average territory.

The Times Of India gave a rating of 3 on 5 for the film and wrote that, "At a time in which each of us have heard numerous stories on people who had to barricade themselves away from others in quarantine, or have even experienced it themselves first-hand, Sunny and his bitter struggles can be relatable for most."

Movies filmed in quarantine have almost become a genre by themselves during the pandemic period, marking how an industry adapted to the changing times, The subject and presentation are challenging, but the director pulls it off at a crisp 1 hour and 33 minutes running time with the aid of thoughtful writing and a leading man in impeccable form. Sunny is selected in the competition section and is the only Indian film in the Calella Film Festival right now. The festival has been screening very good films for the past five-six years, and it's a very proud moment for Team Sunny that we have got an opportunity to showcase it in front of an international audience. Sunny is also going to be screened at the Dhaka International Film Festival. It has been selected for screening at the Asian Competition section. We are very happy and really looking forward to the experiences, Jayasurya won the Best Actor at the 20th Dhaka International Film Festival for Sunny
