= Suvarna Purushan =

- Poster
- Directed by: Sunil Puveily
- Written by: Sunil Puveily
- Produced by: Jees Lazar; Litty George
- Starring: Innocent; Lena; Sreejith Ravi; Sasi Kalinga; Biju Kuttan
- Cinematography: Shiju M. Bhaskar
- Edited by: Vishnu Venugopal
- Music by: Score: Nikhil Prabha
- Production companies: Puveily Cinema; JL Films
- Release date: 20 April 2018 (India)
- Country: India
- Language: Malayalam

Suvarna Purushan (transl. Golden Man) is a 2018 Indian Malayalam-language film written and directed by Sunil Puveily and starring Innocent, Sreejith Ravi, Biju Kuttan, and Lena. The principal photography took place at Irinjalakuda, Kerala.

== Plot ==
The film tells the story of Rappayi, a theatre operator and a Mohanlal fan in Irinjalakuda as he leaves his work on the release day of Mohanlal-starring Pulimurugan in his theatre, Mary Matha.

== Cast ==
- Innocent as Rappayi
- Lena as Deepa Pradeep
- Sreejith Ravi as Charlie, Rappayi's assistant
- Biju Kuttan as Isaac
- Sasi Kalinga as Canteen Kumaran
- Anjali Ameer
- Sunil Sukhada as Stephen
- Pradeep Kottayam as Vijayan
- Sinoj Varghese
- Sam Mohan
- Jijoy Rajagopal

== Production ==
Suvarna Purushan is the directorial debut of Sunil Puveily. Innocent plays the lead role of Rappayi, a hardcore Mohanlal fan. Rappayi works in a fictional theatre named Mary Matha. The film is a take on peoples admiration towards actor Mohanlal. Puveily who had previously directed documentary films initially thought of making Suvarna Purushan as a documentary film. It was completely filmed in and around Irinjalakuda, Kerala.
