= Puzhikkadakan =

- Film poster
- Directed by: Gireesh Nair
- Screenplay by: Dialogues and screenplay: Shyal Satheesh; Hari Prasad Koleri
- Story by: Gireesh Nair; Unni Malayil
- Produced by: Sam; Naufal
- Starring: Chemban Vinod Jose; Dhanya Balakrishna
- Music by: Ranjith Meleppat; Ajay Joseph (1 song); Bijibal (1 song)
- Production company: Evaab Productions KASHSH Movies (Sajith V Nambiar )
- Distributed by: KASHSH Movies
- Release date: 29 November 2019
- Country: India
- Language: Malayalam

Puzhikkadakan is a 2019 Indian Malayalam-language romantic drama directed by newcome Gireesh Nair and starring Chemban Vinod Jose and Dhanya Balakrishna in lead roles.

== Cast ==
- Chemban Vinod Jose as Samuel
- Dhanya Balakrishna as Anna
- Jayasurya as a district collector
- Maala Parvathy as Thresyamma, Samuel's mother
- Alencier Ley Lopez as Koshy
- Sudhi Koppa as O. Santhan
- Balu Varghese as Sebastian / Seban
- Aswathy Sreekanth as TV presenter
- Gokulan as Manoj
- anil as Murali Menon
- Dinesh Prabhakar as Varghese
- vijay babu as ajay Kallarakkal
- rajesh madhavan as Gafoor
- Azees Nedumangad as Josutty
- pradeep kottayam as vaidyar

== Production ==
The movie is based on real life events. Chemban Vinod Jose plays the lead character of an army sergeant while Dhanya Balakrishna and Mala Parvathy play his wife and mother, respectively. Jayasurya plays the role of a collector in the film and his role is based on Sriram Venkitaraman. The trailer release in November and generated publicity due to its satire. The movie discusses the degrading quality of some of India's roads. The film released on 29 November.

== Soundtrack ==
The music was composed by Ranjith Meleppat, Ajay Joseph, and Bijibal. Meleppat composed three songs while Ajay Joseph and Bijibal each composed one song, respectively.

- Note: all songs are composed by Ranjith Meleppat, except where indicated.

No.	Title	Lyrics	Singer(s)	Length
1.	"Ponveyilin"	Rafeeq Ahamed	Vijay Yesudas, Anne Amie	3:27
2.	"Nakshathram"	Manu Manjith	K S Harishankar	3:15
3.	"Puzhikkadakan"	Ranjith Meleppat	Harish Sivaramakrishnan, Santhosh Varma	3:56
4.	"Akaleyaayi (Music by Ajay Joseph)"	Gireesh Nair	Arun Naik	3:56
5.	"Mazhavannu (Music by Bijibal)"	Santhosh Varma	P. Jayachandran	2:58
Total length:				17:32

== Release ==
The Times of India gave the film a rating of three out of five stars and wrote that "The film tackles the relevant topic emotionally and is sure to make the audience think, especially with its characters who are relatable laymen".
