= Janamaithri =

- Theatrical release poster
- Directed by: John Manthrickal
- Written by: John Manthrickal; James Sebastian
- Produced by: Vijay Babu
- Starring: Indrans; Saiju Kurup; Vijay Babu; Sabumon Abdusamad
- Cinematography: Vishnu Narayanan
- Edited by: Lijo Paul
- Music by: Shaan Rahman
- Production company: Friday Film House Experiments
- Distributed by: Friday Film House
- Release date: 19 July 2019 (India)
- Running time: 121 minutes
- Country: India
- Language: Malayalam

Janamithiri (transl. Public Goodwill) is a 2019 Indian Malayalam-language slapstick-comedy drama film directed by John Manthrickal, it stars Indrans, Saiju Kurup, Vijay Babu, and Sabumon Abdusamad in the lead roles.

== Plot ==
Samyukthan is a sales manager in an upcoming CCTV firm where he is criticized for his downhill job performance and is often compared to Jack Daniels, who is the star salesman in the company's northern branch. One evening he decides to meet up with his friend in Paramedu.

Sub-Inspector Shibu and his constables Ashraf and Lawrence are baffled by a series of repeating incidents where two pieces of black tape is found on houses in the neighborhood in Paramedu. They suspect a North Indian migrant worker and arrest him. Soon the Higher Police Authorities decide to start a mission known as "Oru Chayakku oru jeevan", which aims to increase the bond between the Police and the Public by offering a cup of tea to drivers late at night into early morning. SI Shibu and his Constables prepare for the mission and Samyukthan happens to be their first customer. After a lot of persuasion, Samyukthan drinks the tea. But now he needs to urgently get to a toilet in the middle of the night after eating rotten chicken.

Ashraf accompanies Samyukthan in search of a toilet and stumble upon a homeowner who lets him use the toilet. Right after that they encounter a youngster, wearing a ski-mask, who starts running on seeing Ashraf. Ashraf starts running behind the lad with Samyukthan behind. The youngster snatches the bike of a newspaper delivery man and manages to escape. Ashraf and Samyukthan meet the delivery man and they decide to get back to Samyukthan's car and figure the man's bike out later.

Meanwhile, a car thief by the name of Raphael Panjimootil Mathai and his brothers steal the car from the house where Ashraf and Samyukthan had been. One of the brothers also snatched an orchid plant from the house. Soon they encountered the police officers giving tea and they tactfully managed to avoid suspicions and gifted SI Shibu with the orchid plant and continued on their way to dismantle and sell the parts of the car. With the sun about to rise, the Police Officers pack up and head to the station.

At dawn, the homeowners realize that their car has been stolen and report it to the police with the Media exaggerating all the details. SP Ashok Kumar uploads the videos of SI Shibu being gifted with the orchid and the Higher Authorities scold SP Ashok since the Orchid and the Car were the ones reported missing and a video of police accepting gifts from thieves wouldn't do them any good. He informs SI Shibu and they start the search by going to the victim's house.

As the car thieves kept driving, they collided with the youngster on the bike and accept to drop him in the next junction. Soon they encounter Ashraf, Samyukthan and the newspaper man who asks for a lift to which they gladly oblige. Ashraf gets a call from SI Shibu about the missing car and notes down the number plate. The youngster who was travelling with them is finally found out to be the one who stole the bike and escaped. Ashraf, Samyukthan and the man force him out of the car on which they realized that the car they were travelling on was the stolen car. They get into Samyukthan's car and a chase ensues.

As they chase Raphael and his brothers, Raphael realizes that they will not be able to escape, hence he gets out of the car and boards a nearby bus leaving his brothers to Ashraf. Ashraf brings them into the police station. Soon there happens to be a theft in the bus and the driver drives into the police station upon which Raphael is apprehended. When the youngster is questioned on what he was doing late at night, he answers that he and his accomplice were the ones who placed the pieces of tape on houses and the accomplice who was in the trunk of the stolen car all along was none other than Jack Daniels.

Samyukthan is appreciated for his efforts in helping the police and finally goes to meet his friend. His friend had planned a proposal for him and the girl they are going to happens to live in the house in which Samyukthan had visited the previous night to go to the toilet.

== Cast ==
- Indrans as Sub Inspector Shibu
- Saiju Kurup as Samyukthan
- Vijay Babu as Raphael Panjimootil Mathai
- Manikandan Pattambi as Head constable Lawrence
- Sabumon Abdusamad as Constable Ashraf
- Shebin Benson as Abhimanyu
- Irshad Ali as DYSP Ashok Kumar
- Sruthy Jayan as CPO Pushpamol
- Binny Rinky Benjamin as Samyukthan's would-be
- Balu Varghese as Jack Daniels

== Release and reception ==
The film was released on 19 July 2019.

The Times of India gave the film three out of five stars and wrote that "On the whole, Janamaithri blows the lid off of the pretentious Malayalis and portrays people around us including policemen as simple human beings and takes us through a funny, silly and interesting ride".
