= Aadu (film) =

2015 film by Midhun Manuel Thomas

- Theatrical release poster
- Directed by: Midhun Manuel Thomas
- Written by: Midhun Manuel Thomas
- Produced by: Vijay Babu; Sandra Thomas
- Starring: Jayasurya; Saiju Kurup; Vijay Babu; Sunny Wayne; Vinayakan; Dharmajan Bolgatty
- Narrated by: Mamukkoya
- Cinematography: Vishnu Narayanan
- Edited by: Lijo Paul
- Music by: Shaan Rahman
- Production company: Friday Film House
- Distributed by: Friday Tickets
- Release date: 6 February 2015 (India)
- Country: India
- Language: Malayalam

Aadu(lit. goat) is a 2015 Indian Malayalam-language action comedy film, written and directed by Midhun Manuel Thomas (in his directorial debut). It is the first instalment of the Aadu franchise and was produced and distributed by Vijay Babu and Sandra Thomas through Friday Film House. The film stars Jayasurya, Saiju Kurup, Vijay Babu, Sunny Wayne, Vinayakan, Dharmajan Bolgatty, Vineeth Mohan, Bhagath Manuel, Renji Panicker, Sandra Thomas, Chemban Vinod Jose, Indrans, Bijukuttan, and Harikrishnan.

Aadu was released in India on 6 February 2015. Upon release, it received a mixed response and became a box-office bomb. However, after its home media release the reception towards the film was positive and in time, attained a cult following. A sequel Aadu 2 was released in 2017, and the third installment Aadu 3: One Last Ride - Part 1 has been released on 19 March 2026. Aadu was re-released in Kerala on 16 March 2018.

== Plot ==
In Bangkok, a gangster named Dude is asked by his boss to search for and bring a rare herb from Kerala called Neelakoduveli, believed to bring eternal fortune to its bearer.

In Kerala, Shaji Pappan and his friends who live in the High Range area of Idukki participate in a tug-of-war tournament and win a female goat subsequently christened 'Pinky'. Shaji, who suffers from frequent back pain, has an issue with women due to his wife, Mary, having eloped with his chauffeur, Ponnapan.

He reluctantly allows Pinky inside his van on the condition that Abu, one of his teammates, slaughter it later for a feast. Abu, however, is revealed to be unable to slaughter the goat. This, along with many other problems on their journey back, makes Shaji determined to get rid of Pinky.

One such problem is them being stopped by Inspector 'Sarbath' Shameer, a quirky police officer known for making lemonades by squeezing lemons with suspects' foreheads. As Shameer interrogates them, Menaka Kanthan, an animal welfare activist, arrives and accuses the group of sexually abusing the goat and presses charges. Elsewhere, a veteran leader, P.P Sasi, foolishly discloses politically driven murders publicly and has to escape to evade the law.

Dude and his boys arrive in Kerala in search of Neelakkoduveli, which is now in possession of Satan Xavier, a high-profile Anglo-Indian drug dealer living in the High Range area. They make a deal with Kanjavu Soman, a low-level drug dealer, to retrieve the herb from Xavier. However, the trunk containing Neelakkoduveli is stolen from Soman by masked assailants driving a van similar that of Shaji. Dude thinks that Shaji and his group are the thieves and his men then capture Abu and Pinky as hostages. In reality, the true thief is High Range Hakkim, P.P. Sasi's right-hand man, who wanted to steal the Neelakoduveli for profit after hearing about it from Kanjavu Soman.

Shaji is sent a video of the hostages by Dude, which inadvertently reveals their location. The group attempts to rescue Abu and Pinky but is unable to do so due to the firepower that Dude unleashes. Shaji then reluctantly decides to seek help from his estranged elder brother, Thomas, who arms the group with ancient rifles. These rifles turn out to be duds but the group is still able to defeat Dude and rescue Abu and Pinky. During this clash, Shameer and his men arrive and apprehend Dude, the trunk, and also find Sasi hidden nearby. However, on opening the trunk they discover cow dung instead of the prized herb.

It is then revealed that Soman had switched the trunk with a dung-filled decoy early on. While escaping with it, he fell into a pit and the contents of the trunk were dispersed, which was then unfortunately devoured by Pinky who was nearby. The herb brought Pinky luck, which was why the lamb wasn't harmed.

Shaji finally manages to sell Pinky to a butcher. On the sight of his friends' evoked grievances, he feels a stroke of sympathy and calls Pinky back. But the butcher's daughter, also named Pinky, responds to the call, and a budding romance is implied between her and Shaji Pappan.

== Cast ==
- Jayasurya as Pannimattathil Shaji Pappan
- Saiju Kurup as Arakkal Abu
- Vijay Babu as SI Sarbath Shameer/ Dabangg Shameer
- Sunny Wayne in a dual role as:
  - Saathaan Xavier
    - Antony Elrin D'Silva as Young Xavier
  - Abraham Xavier
- Vinayakan as Damodaran Unnimakan Delmen Edakochi (DUDE)
- Dharmajan Bolgatty as Captain Sachin Cleetus
- Bhagath Manuel as Krishnan Mandaram
- Harikrishnan as Lalan P. K. aka Lolan
- Vineeth Mohan as Kuttan Moonga
- Unni Rajan P Dev as Bastin Pathrose
- Indrans as P.P Sasi Aashan (Based on M. M. Mani)
- Renji Panicker in dual role as:
  - Thomas Paappan, Shaji Pappan's brother
  - Varkey Pappan, Shaji Pappan's father (photo)
- Sandra Thomas as Menaka Kanthan
- Chemban Vinod Jose as High Range Hakkim
- Sudhi Koppa as Kanjavu Soman
- Nelson Sooranad as Paili Vattakuzhy, later named Dragon Paili by Dude
- Geevarghese Eappen as Sakhavu K. P.
- Pradeep Kottayam as Head Constable Siby Mathew
- Chembil Ashokan as Vaidyar
- Salam Bukhari as Hyder Sulthan
- Harisree Martin as Palmist
- Blessy Kurien as Veterinary Doctor
- Swathi Reddy as Pinky (cameo)
- Aju Varghese as Driver Ponnappan (cameo)
- Srinda Arhaan as Mary, Shaji Pappan's wife (cameo)
- Bijukuttan as Battery Simon (cameo)

== Reception ==
Upon release, the film received mixed response. Full comedy scenes Akhila of FilmiBeat stated "Film fails to meet the expectations raised by the first looks and promotion". Veeyen of nowrunning.com said "'Aadu Oru Bheekara Jeevi Aanu' is a fiasco of colossal proportions that is little more than a series of insipid conversations between supposedly hilarious characters. Suffering from some severely smug writing, Aadu Oru Bheekara Jeevi Aanu is iffy stuff that delivers none of the promises that it makes, which includes serving a few earnest laughs as well."

== Music ==
Aadu Oru Bheegara Jeeviyanu

Soundtrack album by Shaan Rahman
- Released: 28 January 2015
- Recorded: 2014
- Genre: Film soundtrack
- Length: 5.23
- Language: Malayalam
- Label: Sargaswara Audio Lab
- Producer: Shaan Rahman

Shaan Rahman chronology
Ormayundo Ee Mukham (2014)	Aadu Oru Bheegara Jeeviyanu (2015)	Oru Vadakkan Selfie (2015)

The original soundtrack and background score were composed by Shaan Rahman with lyrics by Manu Manjith.

Soundtrack

#Title	Singer(s)	Lyrics	Length
"Chingaariyaadu"	Harsha K. H., Jayasurya, Muhammad Ashad	Manu Manjith	2:51
"Kodikayarana"	Anwar Sadath, Shaan Rahman	Manu Manjith	2:32

Background score

#Title	Singer(s)	Lyrics	Length
"Shaaji Paappan"	Anwar Sadath, Shaan Rahman	Manu Manjith	00:52
"Abu Bheekaran"	Anwar Sadath, Shaan Rahman	Manu Manjith	00:54
"Dude"	Anwar Sadath, Shaan Rahman	Manu Manjith	00:46
"Sarbath Shameer"	Anwar Sadath, Shaan Rahman	Manu Manjith	00:50
"Sathan Xavier"	Shaan Rahman	Manu Manjith	00:52
"Lal Salaam(Shashi Ashan)"	Muhammad Ashad, Shaan Rahman	Manu Manjith	00:46

== Sequels ==
=== Sequels ===
A second instalment to the film series called Aadu 2 was released on 22 December 2017 and was a commercial success at the box office.

A third instalment in the film series, titled Aadu 3, was released on 19 March 2026. The film was a commercial success at the box office and became one of the highest-grossing Malayalam films of 2026.

The final installment, Aadu 3: The Ride Ends - Part 2 is set to conclude the Aadu trilogy and shooting is expected to commence by early 2027.
