= Aadu Puli Attam (disambiguation) =

Aadu Puli Attam or Lambs and Tigers is a strategy-based game.

Aadu Puli Attam may also refer to:

- Aadu Puli Attam (1977 film), a 1977 Tamil-language film
- Aadu Puli Aattam (2006 film), a 2006 Tamil-language film
- Aadupuliyattam, a 2016 Malayalam-language film
