= Vinayakan =

Indian actor (born 1970)

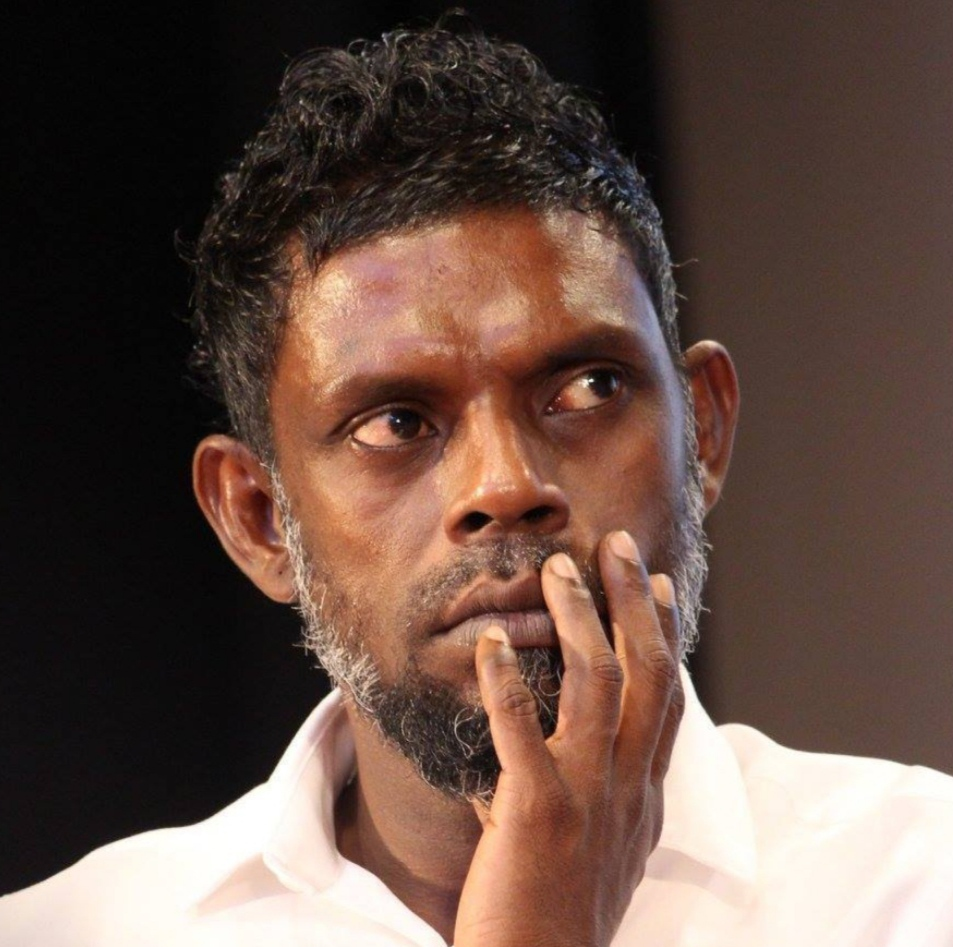
- Vinayakan in 2022
- Born: Vinayakan T. K. 1969 (age 56–57) (Note: age calculated on the basis of the interview, "around nineteen-twenty years of age"- debut. "Big B happened I tried for it, it took around eighteen years"- Big B was released in 2007); Ernakulam, Kerala, India
- Occupations: Actor; composer
- Years active: 1995–present
- Spouse: Vineetha (div. 2023)
- Awards: Kerala State Film Award for Best Actor (2016)

Vinayakan is an Indian actor, former dancer, and composer who predominantly works in Malayalam films as well as some Tamil language films. He started his career with a un-credited appearance in the 1995 film Maanthrikam.

Vinayakan won the Kerala State Film Award for Best Actor in the year 2016 for his role of Ganga in Rajiv Ravi's Kammatipaadam. His recognized roles include Edakochi "Dude" in Aadu - Oru Bheegara Jeevi Aanu and its successor film Aadu 2, and as Ayyappan in Lijo Jose Pellissery's Ee.Ma.Yau.

He gained wider attention by playing the antagonist Varman in Nelson Dilipkumar's Tamil-language action film Jailer (2023) starring Rajinikanth.

== Career ==
=== Acting ===
Vinayakan began his career as a dancer and had a dance troupe named Black Mercury with Fire dance being his forte. Director Thampi Kannanthanam introduced him in Maanthrikam and later in Onnaman. He was noticed for his performances in Stop Violence, Vellithira, Chathikkatha Chanthu, Chotta Mumbai and Thottappan. Also, he appeared in a couple of Bollywood movies.

Vinayakan was appreciated for his performance as Ganga in Rajeev Ravi's 2016 film Kammatipaadam, and nominated for a national award. It also brought him the Best Actor Award of the Kerala State Film Awards, The North American Film Award for Outstanding performance in a film and Best Actor Award (2016) of the Cinema Paradiso Club Cine Awards. In the same film, he made his debut as a music director.

Ee.Ma.Yau. was included in The Hindu's top 25 Malayalam films of the decade and is widely regarded as one of the defining movies of the New Wave Movement.

His upcoming projects include Gautham Vasudev Menon's Dhruva Natchathiram:Chapter One - Yuddha Kaandam.

=== Music ===
Vinayakan composed the song "Puzhu Pulikal" for the movie Kammatipaadam. He has also composed the music for the title track of Trance (2020). He has also sung songs for Rafi's film Role Models and another one for Ordinary, Sugeeth's movie.

== Controversies ==
- On 24 October 2023, he was arrested for creating a ruckus at the Ernakulam Town North police station in Kochi. The incident was from a family dispute and he was later released on bail after a medical examination. MLA of Thrikkakara, Uma Thomas, publicly criticized the quick release, suggesting it was related to Vinayakan's political associations
- On 7 September 2024, Vinayakan was taken into custody by Rajiv Gandhi International Airport Police in Hyderabad following an altercation with Central Industrial Security Force (CISF) gate staff. He was reportedly under the influence of alcohol during the incident. Security officials affirmed he arrived in Hyderabad in a visibly drunken state on an Indigo flight from Kochi and was to travel to Goa, before his arrest.
- On 9 May 2025, Vinayakan was taken into custody for drunk and disorderly behaviour at a hotel in Kollam, where he was staying from May 2 for a movie shoot.

== Filmography ==
Key
| † | Denotes films that have not yet been released |

=== Malayalam ===
| Year | Title | Role | Notes |
|---|---|---|---|
| 1995 | Maanthrikam | Michael Jackson dupe | Debut |
| 2001 | Onnaman | Patrick | |
| 2002 | Stop Violence | Montha | |
| 2003 | Vellithira | Padavan | |
| 2003 | Ivar | Vinayakan | |
| 2004 | Chathikkatha Chanthu | Romy | |
| 2004 | Greetings | Hari | |
| 2004 | Quotation | Maya | |
| 2005 | By the People | Porter | |
| 2005 | Makalkku | Mental Patient | |
| 2005 | Junior Senior | Sivan | |
| 2005 | Udayon | Thoma's helper | |
| 2006 | Thanthra | Mayan | |
| 2006 | Chinthamani Kolacase | Uchandi | |
| 2006 | Jayam | Saheer | |
| 2007 | Chotta Mumbai | Satheeshan | |
| 2007 | Big B | Pandi Asi | |
| 2008 | Pachamarathanalil | Mad Man | |
| 2009 | Nammal Thammil | Tony | |
| 2009 | Daddy Cool | Shelvam | |
| 2009 | Sagar alias Jacky Reloaded | Style | |
| 2010 | Best Actor | Pottan | |
| 2011 | The Train | Githu | |
| 2012 | Thalsamayam Oru Penkutty | Alex | |
| 2012 | Bachelor Party | Fakeer | |
| 2013 | Police Maman | Manu | |
| 2013 | 5 Sundarikal | Chandran | Segment - Aami |
| 2013 | Daivathinte Swantham Cleetus | Sayippu | |
| 2014 | Masala Republic | Bengali Babu | |
| 2014 | Njan Steve Lopez | Prathaapan | |
| 2014 | Iyobinte Pustakam | Chemban | |
| 2014 | Seconds | Thampi | |
| 2015 | Aadu - Oru Bheegara Jeevi Aanu | Damodaran Unnimakan Delmen Edakochi "Dude" | |
| 2015 | Chandrettan Evideya | Rajaraja Cholan | Extended cameo |
| 2015 | Any Time Money | | |
| 2016 | Kali | Johnettan | |
| 2016 | Kammattipaadam | Gangadharan (Ganga) | Best Actor - Kerala State Film Award |
| 2017 | Role Models | Jyothish Narayanan | |
| 2017 | Aadu 2 | Damodaran Unnimakan Delmen Edakochi "Dude" | |
| 2018 | Diwanjimoola Grand Prix | Vareedh | |
| 2018 | Swathandriam Ardharathriyil | Simon | |
| 2018 | Ee.Ma.Yau | Ayyappan | |
| 2019 | Thottappan | Ithaq | |
| 2019 | Pranaya Meenukalude Kadal | Hyder | |
| 2019 | Valiyaperunnal | Himself | Cameo |
| 2020 | Trance | Thomas | Also composed title track |
| 2021 | Operation Java | Ramanathan | |
| 2022 | Pada | Balu | |
| 2022 | Oruthee | Sub Inspector Antony | |
| 2022 | Panthrandu | Andhro | |
| 2023 | Kasargold | Alex | |
| 2024 | Thekku Vadakku | Madhavan | |
| 2025 | The Pet Detective | Yaqat Ali | |
| 2025 | Kalamkaval | Jayakrishnan | |
| 2026 | Aadu 3 | Damodaran Unnimakan Delmen Edakochi "Dude" and Sulthan Azam Khan | Dual role |
| 2026 | Titans | Rejimon | |

=== Tamil ===
| Year | Title | Role | Notes |
|---|---|---|---|
| 2006 | Thimiru | Maayi | credited as Vinayagam |
| 2008 | Singakutty | Gumban | Uncredited |
| 2008 | Kaalai | Mokkai | credited as Vinayagam |
| 2008 | Ellam Avan Seyal | Pichandi | credited as Vinayagam |
| 2008 | Silambattam | Tamizh’s best friend | credited as Vinayagam |
| 2009 | Madurai Sambavam | Anand aka Mandaiyan | Uncredited |
| 2011 | Siruthai | Bavuji's henchman | credited as Vinayagam |
| 2013 | Maryan | Theekkurissi | |
| 2023 | Jailer | Varman | |
| 2026 | Jailer 2 | Varman | Dream appearance |
| TBA | Dhruva Natchathiram † | TBA | Awaiting release |

=== Other languages ===
| Year | Title | Role | Language | Notes |
|---|---|---|---|---|
| 2005 | James | Shanti Narayan's henchman | Hindi | |
| 2006 | Asadhyudu | Thambu | Telugu | |
| 2008 | Ekaloveyudu | Bhakta's brother | Telugu | |

== Awards ==
| Year | Award | Category | Film(s) | Result |
|---|---|---|---|---|
| 2016 | Kerala State Film Award | Best Actor | Kammatipaadam | Won |
| 2016 | Movie Munshi Cine Awards | Best Actor | Kammatipaadam | Won |
| 2017 | Filmfare Awards South | Best Supporting Actor | Kammatipaadam | Won |
| 2017 | CPC Cine Awards | Best Actor | Kammatipaadam | Won |
| 2018 | CPC Cine Awards | Best Character Actor | Ee.Ma.Yau. | Won |
| 2019 | Filmfare Awards South | Best Supporting Actor | Ee.Ma.Yau. | Won |
