= Biju Kuttan =

Indian actor (born 1976)

Bijukuttan
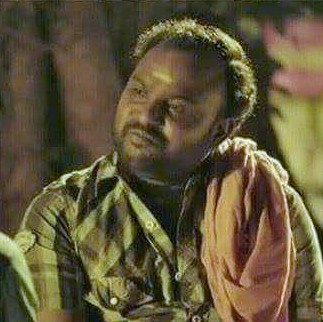
- Born: 13 May 1976 (age 50); Ernakulam, Kerala, India
- Occupation: Actor
- Years active: 2005–present
- Spouse: Subitha
- Children: 2
- Parents: Anandan; Chandrika

Biju Kuttan (born 13 May 1976) is an Indian actor and comedian who appears in Malayalam films. As of June 2021, he has acted in more than 70 Malayalam films.

Biju Kuttan is born in North Paravur, Ernakulam. He completed most of his schooling from SNM HSS MOOTHAKUNNAM, Ernakulam Biju is married to Subitha. The couple have two daughters—Lakshmi and Parvathi.

== Career ==
In 2006, he acted in a supporting role alongside Mammootty in the Malayalam film Pothen Vava. It was a comedic role. In the same year, he acted in another full-length comedy role in the Mohanlal starrer Chotta Mumbai, which gave a major breakthrough in his career. In 2019, he played Sinthappan, one of the main characters, in the film An International Local Story.

== Filmography ==
Key
†	Denotes films that have not yet been released

- All films are in Malayalam language unless otherwise noted.

Year	Title	Role	Notes
2006	Pachakuthira	Jeevan	
2006	Pothan Vava	Mathai	
2007	Chotta Mumbai	Susheelan	
2007	Flash	Vaidyar's Assistant	
2008	Kichamani MBA	Udhayabhanu	
2008	Kerala Police	Balram	
2008	Jubilee		
2008	Annan Thampi	Santhosh	
2008	Twenty:20	Ottu Murali	
2008	Thavalam	Bijukuttan	
2008	Mayabazar	Girijan	
2008	Malabar Wedding	'Irumpan' Sadu	
2009	Love In Singapore	Narayanan	
2009	Decent Parties		
2009	Dr. Patient	Sajan	
2009	The Trigger		
2009	Oru Black and White Kudumbam	Kakka Thampuran	
2009	Duplicate	Professional killer 2	
2009	Utharaswayamvaram		
2009	Kappal Muthalali		
2009	Gulumal: The Escape	Constable Vasu	
2010	Kanmazha Peyyum Munpe		
2010	Ringtone	Sarasan	
2010	Advocate Lakshmanan – Ladies Only		
2010	Annarakkannanum Thannalayathu		
2010	Oridathoru Postman		
2010	Best Actor	Surendran	
2010	Nirakazhcha		
2010	Thaskara Lahala		
2010	Njan Sanchari		
2010	3 Char Sau Bees	Palanichami	
2010	Chekavar		
2010	Oru Small Family		
2010	Again Kasargod Khader Bhai	Kochanty	
2010	Puthumukhangal		
2010	Karayilekku Oru Kadal Dooram		
2011	Ithu Nammude Katha		
2011	Note Out	Ajeesh/Aji	
2011	Doubles		
2011	Bhakthajanangalude Sradhakku		
2011	Vaadamalli		
2011	Sankaranum Mohananum		
2011	The Filmstaar		
2011	Ulakam Chuttum Valiban	Thankachan	
2012	Lakshmi Vilasam Renuka Makan Raghuraman		
2012	Oru Kudumba Chithram	Purushu	
2012	Track	Vishal	
2012	Ee Thirakkinidayil		
2012	Doctor Innocentanu	Rajappan	
2012	Vaadhyar		
2013	Dolls	Vishambharan	
2013	My Fan Ramu	Kuttan	
2013	Ennennum Ormakayi		
2013	Annum Innum Ennum		
2013	Olipporu	Vasu	
2013	Immanuel	Driver	
2013	Mr. Bean		
2015	Female Unnikrishnan	Docomo Paapan	
2015	Aadu Oru Bheegara Jeeviyanu	Battery Simon	
2015	Kunjiramayanam	Bheekaran	
2015	Adi Kapyare Kootamani	Shaanthappan	
2016	Annmariya Kalippilannu	Velichapaad	
2017	Godha	Kola machan	
2017	Chicken Kokkachi		Full length slapstick comedy
2017	Aadu 2	Battery Simon	
2018	Kala Viplavam Pranayam		Cameo
2018	Mohanlal	Solomon	
2018	Aravindante Athidhikal	Sumesh	
2018	Suvarna Purushan	Isaac	
2018	Nithyaharitha Nayakan	Suresh	
2019	An International Local Story	Sinthappan	
2019	Shibu	Prahladhan (Aliyan)	
2019	Irupathiyonnaam Noottaandu	Godwin's friend	
2019	Chila NewGen Nattuvisheshangal		
2020	Uriyadi	Rajanikanth Vedivecham kovil	
2021	Minnal Murali	Kunjan	
2021	My Dear Machans		
2022	Karnan Napoleon Bhagath Singh	Esthappan	
2024	Ajayante Randam Moshanam	Kuttappan	
2024	Kallanmaarude Veedu	kurukkan Manoj	
2025	Ambalamukkile Visheshangal		
2025	The Case Diary	Manoharan	
2026	Magic Mushrooms		
2026	Aadu 3	Battery Simon	
2026	Vaazha II: Biopic of a Billion Bros	Rajan	
2026	Karakkam	Harishchandra	

== Television ==
Actor

- Five Star Thattukada (Asianet)- 2005-2008
- Savari Girigiri (Surya TV)- 2005
- Ettu Sundarikalum Njanum (Surya TV)- 2006-2008
- Veendum Chila Veetuviseshangal (Asianet)- 2007
- Comedy stars season 2 (Asianet) as Host- 2018
- Thattukada - Salt N Pepper (Kaumudy)- 2015
- Comedy super nights (Flowers TV -HD) 2018

Judge

- Bhima Jewels Comedy Festival (Mazhavil Manorama)- 2014
- Comedy Utsavam (Flowers TV)- 2018
- Comedy Stars (Asianet)- 2018
- Minnum Tharam Season 2(Asianet)- 2021
