= Aadu 2 =

2017 film by Midhun Manuel Thomas

- Theatrical release poster
- Directed by: Midhun Manuel Thomas
- Written by: Midhun Manuel Thomas
- Produced by: Vijay Babu
- Starring: Jayasurya; Saiju Kurup; Vinayakan; Sunny Wayne; Dharmajan Bolgatty; Vijay Babu; Bhagath Manuel; Vineeth Mohan
- Narrated by: Saiju Kurup
- Cinematography: Vishnu Narayanan
- Edited by: Lijo Paul
- Music by: Shaan Rahman
- Production company: Friday Film House
- Distributed by: Friday Film House
- Release date: 22 December 2017 (India)
- Country: India
- Language: Malayalam

Aadu 2 is a 2017 Indian Malayalam-language action comedy film written and directed by Midhun Manuel Thomas and produced by Vijay Babu under Friday Film House. It is the sequel to the 2015 film Aadu, and stars Jayasurya, Saiju Kurup, Vinayakan, Vijay Babu, Sunny Wayne, Dharmajan Bolgatty, Anson Paul, Mamukkoya, Bhagath Manuel, Vineeth Mohan, Indrans, Baiju, Bijukuttan, Sudhi Koppa and Harikrishnan reprising their roles. This is the second installment in the Aadu film series.

Principal photography began on 13 September 2017. Aadu 2 was released in India on 22 December 2017. The film was a commercial success at the box office. A sequel, Aadu 3, was released on 19 March 2026.

== Plot ==
In the high range of Idukki, Shaji Pappan and his friends Arakkal Abu, Captain Sachin Cleetus, Krishnan Mandaram, Kuttan Moonga, Lalan P. K. alias Lolan and Bastin Pathrose are leading a normal life. One day, an uninformed Shaji fights and tosses an SI into a dam unaware that his friends were smuggling sandalwood. This leads him to being charged and bailed. He now has to report to the police station where Shameer joins as the SI. Due to this financial strain, Shaji and his friends decide to compete in a tug-of-war tournament to win a massive gold trophy. To pay for the entry fee of Rs.50,000 Shaji steals the documents for his house and uses it as collateral to take a loan from a loan shark, Irumbu Abdullah.

Dude and his gang, who unable to go back to Bangkok are working in a restaurant. The gang starts digging a tunnel to rob a bank nearby. They complete the tunnel and break into the vault the very night that demonetisation of Indian currency notes takes place. The demonetisation is also bad news for drug dealer Satan Xavier and his assistants Kanjav Soman and Battery Simon.

Shaji's friends enters the tournament and wins the gold trophy. However, the trophy is stolen from them on their journey home. Shaji's mother, realizing that the house documents were stolen, faints and is taken to an hospital. The group then tracks down the thief, Anali Sabu, whose team were runners up in the tournament. Shaji and group break into Sabu's dance party to retrieve the trophy. They beat up Sabu and destroy his place. However, Sabu and his elder brother, Chekuthan Lassar, a notorious criminal, return and burn down Shaji's house. Lassar demands a hefty sum as compensation for the damages they caused.

Mahesh Shetty, a counterfeiter is finalizing a deal to buy the engraving plates of the new 500 Rupee note. But Shetty's partner, Prabhakar, decides to cheat him by making a deal with Xavier. He does this by pretending to have the plates stolen from him. Soman informs Dude about this deal who then decides to steal the plates for himself. Coincidentally, these engraving plates as well as the back medicine for Shaji were to arrive on the same train at the same station. Shaji and his friends reach the station first and receive the plates instead, and Xavier's men get the medicine. This sets a motion, a relentless pursuit by all involved to get these plates.

In the end, Shaji and his friends get the plates and gives it to Lassar to make new fake notes. But soon a foul occurs after which Lassar, Sabu and his henchmen hits Shaji and his friends but towards the end, Shaji and his friends fights back and defeats Lassar, Sabu and his henchman. Lassar tries to kill Shaji with a grenade but Cleetus saves them. The government officials commend them for their honesty but give them a paltry reward. When Shaji and his friends were returning back, they are stopped by the guys who were supposed to give Shaji's medicine for back pain and they give them the dollars which was accidentally given to Shaji. Shaji and his friends, who have the dollars are awestruck thinking what to do with the money. Meanwhile Shaji sees Ponnappan, his ex-driver, eloping with another girl. The film ends by Shaji and his gang chasing him.

== Cast ==
- Jayasurya as Pannimattathil Shaji Pappan
- Saiju Kurup as Arakkal Abu
- Sunny Wayne as Saathan Xavier
- Vijay Babu as SI Sarbath Shameer
- Vinayakan as Damodaran Unnimakan Delmon Edakkochi (Dude) / Sulaiman
- Dharmajan Bolgatty as Captain Sachin Cleetus
- Bhagath Manuel as Krishnan Mandaram
- Harikrishnan as Lalan P. K. (Lolan)
- Vineeth Mohan as Kuttan "Moonga"
- Unni Rajan P. Dev as Bastin Pathrose
- Indrans as Home Minister P. P. Sasi Aashan
- Aju Varghese as Driver Ponnappan (cameo appearance)
- Sijoy Varghese as Kesav Sharma IPS, Joint Director of Intelligence
- Hariprashanth M G as Chekuthan Lassar
- Anson Paul as Anali Sabu, Chekuthan Lassar's brother
- John Kaippallil as Mahesh Shetty
- Sudhi Koppa as Kanjavu Soman, Saathaan's ally and Dude's helper
- Bijukuttan as Battery Simon, Saathaan's ally
- Nelson Sooranad as Paili Vattakkuzhi / Dragon Paili, Dude's ally
- Baiju as Panchayath President Uthup Theckeparambil, Anagapara Grama Panchayath
- Mamukkoya as "Irumbu" Abdullah
- Irshad as Prabhakaran, Shetty's helper
- Ponnambalam as Mayilvahanam, Dude's boss/hotel owner
- Sethu Lakshmi as Mariyamma, Shaji Pappan's mother
- Athira Patel as Rachael, Shaji Pappan'sniece
- Jayasanker Karimuttam as Lonappan, "Irumbu" Abdullah's driver
- Sonal Devraj and Nicole Concessao as dancers in the song "Changaathi Nannaayaal"
- Nazreen Nazar as Stella, Pappan's love interest and neighbour
- Srindaa as Mary, Shaji Pappan's Ex-Wife (Cameo Appearance)
- Manikandan Cheruvathur as SI Pradeep Kumar
- Noby Marcose as Constable Dhanayan
- Renji Panicker as Pannimattathil Thomas Pappan, Shaji Pappan's brother (mentioned only)
- Pradeep Kottayam as Constable Siby Mathew (cameo appearance)
- Ameya Mathew as Ponnappan's Lover (cameo appearance)
- Vineeth Thattil David as Kaippuzha Kunjappan (cameo appearance)
- Chemban Vinod Jose as High Range Hakkim (flashback scene from part 1, shown in the prologue)
- Sinoj Varghese as Note Marti

== Production ==
The film is a sequel to the 2015 film Aadu produced by Vijay Babu and Sandra Thomas under the banner of Friday Film House and directed by Midhun Manuel Thomas.

== Soundtrack ==
The film features soundtrack composed by Shaan Rahman, it was released by Friday Film House. Lyrics for the songs were written by B. K. Harinarayanan, Manu Manjith, and Preethi Nambiyar. A single titled "Aadu 2 – Success Song" was also released, composed and sung by the sister duo Amrutha Suresh and Abhirami Suresh.

Aadu 2 (Original Motion Picture Soundtrack)
No.	Title	Lyrics	Singer(s)	Length
1.	"Changaathi Nannaayaal"	Manu Manjith, Preethi Nambiyar	Keerthana Shabareesh, Zia Ul Haq	3:45
2.	"Aadeda Aattam Nee"	Manu Manjith	Shaan Rahman	3:43
3.	"Oru Theepole"	B. K. Harinarayanan	Hesham Abdul Wahab	3:06
4.	"Shaji Pappan Returns(Theme)"	Manu Manjith	Shaan Rahman	0:51
5.	"Dude is Back(Theme)"	Manu Manjith	Shaan Rahman	1:16
6.	"Sarbath Shameer (Theme)"	Manu Manjith	Shaan Rahman	0:52
7.	"Abu Bheekaran (Theme)"	Manu Manjith	Shaan Rahman	0:52
8.	"Satan Xavier (Theme)"	Manu Manjith	Shaan Rahman	0:54
9.	"Captain Cleetus (Theme)"	Manu Manjith	Shaan Rahman	0:17
10.	"Chekuthaan Laasar (Theme)"		Shaan Rahman	1:06
11.	"Aashaan (Theme)"	Manu Manjith	Shaan Rahman	0:46

== Box office ==
The film collected ₹ 3.45 crore on the opening day, the highest opening day for a Jayasurya movie, and ₹ 13 crore in the first weekend (5 days) in Kerala box office. It grossed $453,294 from 38 screens in the opening weekend (18 – 21 January) in the United Arab Emirates and $548,189 in three weeks. The film earned $31,776 (₹ 20.43 lakh) from the United States in four weeks. The film was the second highest grossing Malayalam film of the year 2017 and ran over 100 days in theatres.

== Sequel ==
A sequel titled Aadu 3 was announced in 2022 and shooting of the film began in May 2025. The film released in theatres worldwide in March 19th, 2026 .
