= Aadu 3 =

2026 Indian film by Midhun Manuel Thomas

- Theatrical release poster
- Directed by: Midhun Manuel Thomas
- Written by: Midhun Manuel Thomas
- Produced by: Vijay Babu; Venu Kunnappilly
- Starring: Jayasurya; Saiju Kurup; Vinayakan; Sunny Wayne; Dharmajan Bolgatty; Vijay Babu; Bhagath Manuel; Harikrishnan
- Cinematography: Akhil George
- Edited by: Lijo Paul
- Music by: Songs and Original Themes: Shaan Rahman; Background Score and New Themes: Dawn Vincent
- Production companies: Friday Film House; Kavya Film Company
- Distributed by: Friday Film House
- Release date: 19 March 2026
- Running time: 170 minutes
- Country: India
- Language: Malayalam
- Budget: ₹60 crore
- Box office: ₹120 crore

Aadu 3 (titled on-screen as Aadu 3: Part One – One Last Ride) is a 2026 Indian Malayalam-language fantasy comedy film written and directed by Midhun Manuel Thomas. It is a sequel to Aadu 2 (2017), the third installment in the Aadu film series, and the first of a two-part film. The film was jointly produced by Vijay Babu and Venu Kunnappilly for Friday Film House and Kavya Film Company, respectively. It stars an ensemble cast led by Jayasurya, Saiju Kurup, Vinayakan, Renji Panicker, Vijay Babu, Sunny Wayne, Dharmajan Bolgatty, Bhagath Manuel, Indrans, Bijukuttan, Sudhi Koppa, Harikrishnan, reprising their roles, with Alleya Bourne and Krishna Jeev joining the cast.

Aadu 3 was released worldwide on 19 March 2026, coinciding with Eid ul-Fitr. It received mixed reviews from critics. The film was a commercial success and became one of the highest grossing Malayalam films of 2026.

== Plot ==
(The story pans across 3 timelines. For easiness, the events are arranged as Future (AD 2370), Past (AD 1790) and Present (AD 2025), which are said to be coexisting)

TIMELINE 1 - AD 2370

Earth is ruled by a totalitarian regime known as The Organization. The Organization achieved total dominance by using a rare celestial object called the Star Dust, which possess the ability to manipulate and rewrite timelines.

A resistance movement led by Baba discovers that time in this universe is not linear — past, present, and future coexist simultaneously, and actions in one timeline can alter the others. Realizing the danger, Baba devises a plan to prevent the Organization from ever acquiring the Star Dust by interfering with events in the past.

TIMELINE 3 - AD 1790

Maharaja Padmanabhan Thampuran, an impoverished ruler, governs a small kingdom. Alongside Vareed Mappila, an architect, and Walter Joseph, a British lieutenant colonel, he oversees the construction of the Nagathan bridge.

At the same time, the kingdom faces internal unrest due to heavy taxation, leading to a peasant rebellion. Externally, it is threatened by an invasion led by Sulthan Azam Khan, a commander under Tipu Sultan, who brings with him the devastating Mysorean rockets. Meanwhile, a British fortune hunter, Cassandra, arrives in the kingdom in search of the Star Dust, believed to have landed there centuries earlier as a meteor.

As war looms, Padmanabhan reveals to his trusted aide Karyasthan Narayanan that his ancestors secretly hid the Star Dust. He stores the Star Dust in sealed boxes and entrusts them to Vareed Mappila, who hides them within the structure of the Nagathan Bridge during its construction, but unknown to anyone, Padmanabhan Thampuran also hides it in the forest.

TIMELINE 2 - AD 2025

Shaji Pappan and his gang come into possession of three million US dollars after defeating Chekuthan Lasar and his group. (Note: As shown in Aadu 2 (2017).) They attempt to travel abroad to convert the money but soon discover that the cash is counterfeit.

Elsewhere, Saathan Xavier, struggling with depression after losing the printing plates, learns from his cousin Michael about the Star Dust, believed to be stored inside the Nagathan bridge. Saathan orchestrates a plan to demolish the bridge by influencing politician P. P. Sasi, promising him a share of the profits. SI Sarbath Shameer is assigned to oversee the operation and secure the contents.

Seeking quick money, Pappan establishes a scrap collection company and secures the contract to clear the bridge’s scrap after demolition, threatening Battery Simon and Kanjavu Soman. However, Soman independently contacts Dude and convinces him to steal the boxes for themselves.

After the bridge is demolished, Dude arrives in a helicopter and retrieves the boxes, but Thomas Pappan, Shaji Pappan's brother, shoots the rope, causing Dude and the boxes to fall into the river. Amid the chaos, with Saathan Xavier, Shaji Pappan, Dude and SI Shameer trying to take the boxes for themselves, they are ultimately outsmarted by Kate Lara, an operative of the Organization. When she opens them, she discovers that they are empty.

Simultaneously, in 1790, Maharaja Padmanabhan Thampuran confronts Azam Khan at a ruined gate in the forest, while in 2025, Pappan and Dude face off at the same location. As both confrontations escalate, the hidden Star Dust beneath the gate is activated. The anomaly creates a temporal rupture, pulling them across timelines. Padmanabhan is drawn into 2025 where everyone mistakes him to be Shaji Pappan, while Pappan and Dude are transported into different places of Kerala in the 18th century, where everyone mistakes them as Sulthan Azam Khan and Maharaja Padmanabhan Thampuran.

In the mid-credit scenes we see Shaji Pappan fighting Sulthan Azam Khan's soldiers.

== Cast ==
- Jayasurya as:
  - Pannimattathil Shaji Pappan (AD 2025, teleported to AD 1790)
  - Maharajavu Padmanabhan Thampuran (AD 1790, teleported to AD 2025)
- Vinayakan as:
  - Damodaran Unnimakan Dilmon Edakkochi alias "Dude" / Sulaiman (AD 2025, teleported to AD 1790)
  - Sultan Azam Khan, a commander under Tipu Sultan (AD 1790, possibly teleported to AD 2025)
- Saiju Kurup as:
  - Arakkal Abu (AD 2025)
  - Padanayakan Koma Kurup, Padmanabhan Thampuran's commander-in-chief / Abu Salah (AD 1790)
- Vijay Babu as:
  - SI Sarbath Shameer (AD 2025)
  - Vareed Mappila, an architect (AD 1790)
- Sunny Wayne as:
  - Saathan Xavier (AD 2025)
  - "Lord" Walter Joseph, a British lieutenant colonel and Saathan Xavier's great-grandfather (AD 1790)
- Dharmajan Bolgatty as:
  - Sachin Cleetus a.k.a Captain Cleetus (AD 2025)
  - Karyasthan Thiruvallappattu Narayanan Nair, Padmanabhan Thampuran's helper (AD 1790)
- Indrans as:
  - Home minister P. P. Sasi (AD 2025)
  - Valiya Kelu, a merchant (AD 1790)
  - Baba, a totalitarian ruler (AD 2370)
- Bhagath Manuel as:
  - Krishnan Mandaram (AD 2025)
  - Krishna, Padmanabhan Thampuran's soldier (AD 1790)
- Harikrishnan as:
  - Lalan P. K. alias "Lolan" (AD 2025)
  - Deva, Padmanabhan Thampuran's soldier (AD 1790)
- Unni Rajan P. Dev as:
  - Bastin Pathrose (AD 2025)
  - Chandhu, Padmanabhan Thampuran's soldier (AD 1790)
- Sudheer Karamana as Sorcerer "Chudala" Raman Panicker (AD 2025)
- Alleya Bourne as:
  - Kate Lara (AD 2025)
  - Cassandra, a British fortune hunter (AD 1790)
- Aju Varghese as Koran, Padmanabhan Thampuran's chariot driver (AD 1790)
- Srinda as Maharani Rohini, Padmanabhan Thampuran's wife (AD 1790)
- Sudhi Koppa as:
  - Kanjavu Soman, Saathaan's ally and Dude's helper (AD 2025)
  - Soman, an E.I.C worker and Walter's aide (AD 1790)
- Renji Panicker as:
  - Pannimattathil Thomas Pappan, Shaji Pappan's brother (AD 2025)
  - Narayanan Thampuran, Padmanabhan Thampuran's brother (AD 1790)
- Bijukuttan as:
  - Battery Simon, Saathaan's ally (AD 2025)
  - Sundar, an E.I.C worker and Walter's aide (AD 1790)
- Nelson Sooranad as:
  - Dragon Paily, Dude's accomplice (AD 2025)
  - Vyaali, Azam Khan's ally (AD 1790)
- Noby Marcose as:
  - Police constable Dhanayan (AD 2025)
  - Kunjukunju, Vareed's assistant (AD 1790)
- Nirmal Palazhi as:
  - Police constable Nirmal (AD 2025)
  - Palazhi, Vareed's assistant (AD 1790)
- Binu Adimali as Police Constable Pappy (AD 2025)
- Sethu Lakshmi as Mariyamma, Shaji Pappan's and Thomas Pappan's mother (AD 2025)
- Athira Patel as Rachael, Shaji Pappan's niece and Thomas Pappan's daughter (AD 2025)
- Krishna Jeev as:
  - Moosa, Kuttan Moonga's brother (AD 2025)
  - Gopalan, Padmanabha Thampuran's Soldier (AD 1790)
- Sampath Ram as Mayilvahanam's nephew (AD 2025)
- Nazreen Nazar as Stella, Pappan's neighbour and his love interest (AD 2025)
- Chembil Ashokan as Vaidyan Aandava Kaimal (AD 1790)
- Haritha Parakod as Baba's accomplice (AD 2370)
- Niranjana Anoop as Baba's accomplice (AD 2370)
- Shebin Benson as Baba's accomplice (AD 2370)
- Vineeth Mohan as Kuttan Moonga (cameo via video call, AD 2025)
- Vedhika as dancer in the song "Sulthaan" (cameo appearance, AD 1790)
- Midhun Manuel Thomas as a news reporter (cameo appearance, AD 2025)

== Production ==
=== Development ===
The film was officially announced in March 2024. It is the third instalment of Aadu film series, produced by Vijay Babu of Friday Film House and directed by Midhun Manuel Thomas. In January 2025, Midhun said that the film would be made on a larger scale. The film was launched on 10 May 2025 with a pooja ceremony. In June 2025, Venu Kunnappilly of Kavya Film Company joined the project as co-producer.

=== Filming ===
Principal photography began on 15 May 2025. Jayasurya joined the set on 15 July 2025.

== Music ==
The film features songs and original theme composed by Shaan Rahman. The background score and a new theme was composed by Dawn Vincent. The soundtrack album was distributed by Friday Music Company. The first single, "Sulthaan", was released on 14 March 2026.

All tracks are written by Manu Manjith.

| No. | Title | Lyrics | Music | Singer(s) | Length |
|---|---|---|---|---|---|
| 1. | "Sulthaan" | Manu Manjith (Malayalam), Shaan Rahman (Urdu) | Shaan Rahman | Anila Rajeev, Bharath Sajikumar, Aswin Vijayan, Milan Joy, Akash V. H., Shaan Rahman, Manu Manjith | 4:30 |
| 2. | "Hark! She Comes" | Santhy Balachandran | Dawn Vincent | Anand Sreeraj, Hinitha Hilari, Himna Hilari | 1:48 |
| 3. | "Maarada Mone" | Lillys Thaddeus | Dawn Vincent, Lillys Thaddeus | Lillys Thaddeus | 2:22 |
| 4. | "Dheera Sura" | Dawn Vincent | Dawn Vincent | Ashok Ponnappan, Subramanian K. V. | 1:56 |
| 5. | "Kodikayarana Pooramayi - Reloaded" | Manu Manjith | Shaan Rahman, Dawn Vincent | Anwar Sadath, Shaan Rahman | 2:31 |
| 6. | "Aadu 3: One Last Ride - Part 1: Trailer Theme" | Manu Manjith | Dawn Vincent | Shaan Rahman | 3:02 |
| Total length: | | | | | 16:09 |

=== Background Score ===
Aadu 3

Film score by Shaan Rahman & Dawn Vincent
- Released: 19 March 2026
- Recorded: 2026
- Genre: Film score
- Length: 8:30
- Language: Malayalam
- Label: Friday Film House
- Producers: Shaan Rahman; Dawn Vincent

Aadu 3 OST Reloaded
| No. | Title | Length |
|---|---|---|
| 1. | "Abu Bheekaran Reloaded" | 1:15 |
| 2. | "Captain Cleetus Reloaded" | 0:44 |
| 3. | "Dude Fully Reloaded" | 1:20 |
| 4. | "Satan Meets Paapan" | 0:47 |
| 5. | "Sarbath Shameer Reloaded" | 1:02 |
| 6. | "Sasi Reloaded Saludo Rojo" | 0:52 |
| 7. | "Satan Xavier Reloaded" | 1:29 |
| 8. | "Shaji Paappan Reloaded" | 0:41 |
| 9. | "Venda Paapa Reloaded" | 0:23 |
| Total length: | | 8:30 |

Aadu 3

Soundtrack album by Dawn Vincent
- Released: 19 March 2026
- Recorded: 2026
- Studios: Ds Den, Tesseract, and NHQ, Kochi
- Genre: Feature film score
- Length: 37:18
- Label: Friday Film House

| No. | Title | Length |
|---|---|---|
| 1. | "A.D. 2370" | 2:52 |
| 2. | "Cleerus Cla" | 1:06 |
| 3. | "Tempo Barricade" | 0:48 |
| 4. | "Shaji Paappan Bullet Entry" | 1:02 |
| 5. | "Paappan's Delirium" | 1:12 |
| 6. | "At The Court" | 0:34 |
| 7. | "Michael's Entry" | 1:08 |
| 8. | "Highrange Meeting" | 0:57 |
| 9. | "Satan's Recollection" | 1:14 |
| 10. | "Vareed Mapla Intro" | 1:13 |
| 11. | "Lord Walter Intro" | 1:44 |
| 12. | "Karyasthan Narayanan Intro" | 0:47 |
| 13. | "Valiya Kelu Intro" | 1:31 |
| 14. | "Padmanaban Thumburan Intro" | 1:16 |
| 15. | "Rohini Intro" | 1:04 |
| 16. | "Padanayakan Kurup Intro" | 1:42 |
| 17. | "Azam Khan Intro" | 1:40 |
| 18. | "Paappan Paappan Da" | 0:22 |
| 19. | "But Truth Is" | 1:10 |
| 20. | "Cassandra Intro" | 1:19 |
| 21. | "Fated Convergence" | 1:40 |
| 22. | "Lara Intro" | 1:03 |
| 23. | "Trail Of Riches" | 1:28 |
| 24. | "Great Reveal" | 2:48 |
| 25. | "Crossing Over" | 1:01 |
| 26. | "King Arrives" | 0:33 |
| 27. | "Gunfire Escape" | 4:15 |
| Total length: | | 37:18 |

== Release ==
The film was released in theatres worldwide alongside Dhurandhar: The Revenge on 19 March 2026, coinciding with Ugadi, Gudi Padwa and Eid-al-Fitr.

=== Home media ===
The post theatrical digital streaming rights of the film is acquired by ZEE5. The film began streaming on the platform in Malayalam, Tamil, Kannada, Telugu and Hindi on 1 May 2026.

== Reception ==
=== Critical reception ===
Vignesh Madhu of Cinema Express, who rated three out of five stars, described the film as "fun and impressive in scale, but falls just short". He praised its visuals and production value, while criticizing the runtime and ending. Swathi P. Ajith of Onmanorama noted that "Shaji Pappan and gang are still fun, but the film struggles to match its own legacy", pointing that "the humour, which was once the franchise's biggest weapon, is more inconsistent this time". Gopika I. S. of The Times of India, giving two-and-a-half out of five stars, wrote that the film "leaves one with mixed feelings. A film that excels in production quality and acting falls short in screenplay and comedy", adding that "whether it truly lives up to the hype is debatable". She also criticized the runtime.

Sreeju Sudhakaran of Rediff.com, who rated two out of five stars, described the film as "trapped in its own ambition. While it expands the universe in an interesting manner, it loses sight of the tight, irreverent humour that made the previous films click in the first place". Similarly, Sanjith Sidhardhan of OTT Play, also giving two out of five stars, remarked that "Jayasurya's exhausting film is too unsure to be silly, too conflicted to be serious", adding that it "falters in its bid to go bigger, losing both its slapstick humour and narrative grip in the process", while also criticising the runtime. The Hindu's S. R. Praveen felt the director was "flogging a dead goat through multiple timelines", adding that "despite its ambitious scope and comedic potential, the nearly three-hour movie only offers a series of character introductions rather than a cohesive narrative, ultimately leaving viewers yearning for a satisfying conclusion".

Vishal Menon of The Hollywood Reporter India called the film "a disappointing Multiverse of Blandness", lamenting that it's "GOAT-ed characters get butchered in this wild bore [...] Instead of figuring a specific brand of humour for each character (like in the previous films), Midhun chooses to repeat the same style of dialogues for all, lending a homogeneous dullness". Rating two out of five stars, Anandu Suresh of The Indian Express described it as a "snoozefest" and "amateurish fan-fiction, despite a fascinating climax", noting that "despite having many elements and an ambitious plot, Aadu 3 ends up being an absolute letdown".

=== Box office ===
The film grossed ₹66.60 crore worldwide in three days. In its four-day opening weekend, the film reportedly earned ₹82.50 crore globally, becoming the second highest opening weekend for a Malayalam film, behind Empuraan (2025). According to Vijay Babu, the film's budget was approximately 70–75% of its opening weekend gross, which he stated was ₹87 crore, implying an estimated production cost in the range of ₹60–65 crore. However, producer Venu Kunnappilly later stated that the exact production cost could not be determined, as financial transactions were still ongoing, but estimated it to be around ₹50 crore.

By the end of March, the film had grossed ₹111.17 crore worldwide, making it the highest-grossing Malayalam film of the year up to that point. As of 8 April, the film had reportedly grossed ₹119 crore worldwide.

== Sequel ==
Midhun and Vijay confirmed that Aadu 3 was conceived as a two-part film. However, in an interview, they stated that the second part would proceed depending on the reception of the first part. A follow-up titled Aadu 3: Part 02 - The Ride Ends, was revealed at the end credits.
