= Friday Film House =

Indian film production company

- Type: Private limited company
- Industry: Film production Film distribution
- Founded: 18 September 2013; 13 years ago
- Founder: Vijay Babu
- Headquarters: Kochi, Kerala, India
- Products: Films
- Owner: Vijay Babu
- Subsidiaries: Friday Film Experiments; Friday Tickets (Film Distribution); Friday Home Cinema; Friday Music Company
- Website: fridayfilmhouse.com

Friday Film House Pvt Ltd is an Indian film production company based in Malayalam film industry owned by Vijay Babu who is an actor as well as a producer and is one of the most talked about production houses in the south. Friday Film House has won 7 of the Kerala State Film Awards in various fields in 2014. It has its own distribution division – "Friday Tickets", digital/TV production under the brand "Friday Home Cinema" and music under "Friday Music Company". Notable projects include Aadu Franchise, Angamaly Diaries, Philips and the Monkey Pen, June, Adi Kapyare Kootamani, Thrissur Pooram and Home.

== Films ==
Key
†	Denotes films that have not yet been released

Year	Title	Role	Director	Notes	Ref.
2012	Friday	Production; Distribution	Lijin Jose		
2013	Zachariayude Garbhinikal	Production	Aneesh Anwar		
2013	Philips and the Monkey Pen	Production; Distribution	Rojin Thomas; Shanil Muhammed	Kerala State Film Award for Best Children's Film Director; Kerala State Film Award for Best Child Artist – Sanoop Santhosh; Kerala State Film Award for Best Children's Film	
2014	Peruchazhi	Production; Distribution	Arun Vaidyanathan		
2015	Aadu Oru Bheegara Jeevi Aanu	Production; Distribution	Midhun Manuel Thomas		
2015	Adi Kapyare Kootamani	Production; Distribution	John Varghese		
2016	Theri	Production; Distribution	Atlee	Tamil movie	
2016	Mudhugauv	Production; Distribution	Vipin Das		
2017	Angamaly Diaries	Production; Distribution	Lijo Jose Pellissery		
2017	Aadu 2	Production; Distribution	Midhun Manuel Thomas		
2019	June	Production; Distribution	Ahamed Khabir		
2019	Janamaithri	Production; Distribution	John Manthrickal		
2019	Jallikattu	Distribution	Lijo Jose Pellissery		
2019	Under World	Distribution	Arun Kumar Aravind		
2019	Thrissur Pooram	Production; Distribution	Rajesh Mohanan		
2019	Sullu	Production; Distribution	Vishnu Baradwaj		
2020	Sufiyum Sujathayum	Production	Naranipuzha Shanavas	Direct Release on OTT via Amazon Prime Video	
2021	Home	Production; Distribution	Rojin Thomas	Direct Release on OTT via Amazon Prime Video	
2021	Theerppu	Production; Distribution	Rathish Ambat		
2023	Valatty	Production; Distribution	Devan Jayakumar		
2023	Enkilum Chandrike	Production; Distribution	Adithyan Chandrashekar		
2024	Qalb	Production	Sajid Yahiya		
2024	Abbabba	Production	K. M. Chaitanya	Kannada Film	
2025	Padakkalam	Production	Manu Swaraj		
2026	Aadu 3	Production	Midhun Manuel Thomas	In association with Kavya Film Company	

== Television ==
Year	Title	Channel	Notes
2016–2017	Home Minister	Amrita TV	Game show
2025–2026	Othiri Othiri Swapnangal	Mazhavil Manorama	Soap Opera
