= Vijay Babu (actor, born 1976) =

Indian film actor and film producer

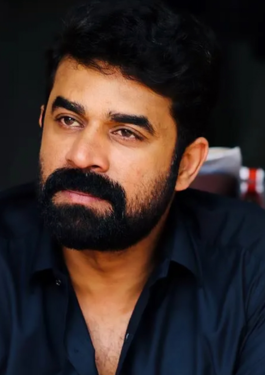
- Born: 14 May 1976 (age 50); Kollam, Kerala, India
- Occupations: Actor; producer; businessman; media executive
- Years active: 2012–present
- Spouse: Smitha
- Website: fridayfilmhouse.com

Vijay Babu is an Indian film producer, actor, and businessman, who works in the Malayalam film industry. He is the founder of the film production company Friday Film House.

Vijay Babu is best known for producing and starring in the films Philips and the Monkey Pen (2013), Peruchazhi (2014), Aadu (2015), Adi Kapyare Kootamani (2015), Mudhugauv (2016), Angamaly Diaries (2017), Aadu 2 (2017), June (2019), Sufiyum Sujatayum (2021), and Home (2021). In 2014, he won the Kerala State Film Award for Best Children's Film (as producer) for Philips and the Monkey Pen. In 2023, He received the National Film Award for Best Feature Film in Malayalam for Home (2021). The character Sarbath Shameer played by Vijay Babu in Aadu film series had developed into a cult following.

Sufiyum Sujatayum, produced by him under his banner Friday Film House, is the first Malayalam film to have a direct release on an OTT platform, Amazon Prime Video. Babu is known for bankrolling many experimental films and supporting upcoming filmmakers in the industry.

== Early life and family ==
Vijay Babu was born in Kollam, Kerala, to Nair parents Subashchandra Babu and Maya Babu. He has two siblings, Vinay Babu and Vijayalakshmi. He studied at St. Jude School, Kollam, and received a graduation from American College, Madurai.

Babu started his media career at STAR India in Mumbai. In 2002, he was selected as the Best Employee of STAR TV. Later that year, he quit his job to venture as an entrepreneur in Dubai. After a few years, he joined as the COO of Asianet and Sitara TV in Hyderabad. In 2009, Babu returned to Kerala as the vice president of Surya TV.

Babu is married to Smitha, a Dubai-based employee. The couple has a son named Bharath.

== Career ==
In 2013, Babu quit his media career and joined the Malayalam film industry as an actor and producer.

Babu is one of the founders and CEO of Friday Film House founded a Kerala-based film production company along with the actress Sandra Thomas. Friday Film House won seven of the Kerala state film awards in various fields in 2014. Though the company was established after the success of the film Friday, the movie is considered the first production venture of Friday Film House.

Babu is best known for his roles in Philips and the Monkey Pen and Nee-Na, and as the producer of Philips and the Monkey Pen, Peruchazhi and Aadu. His role as Vinay Paniker in Nee-Na received appreciation from critics.

== Controversy ==
On 22 April 2022, a newcomer actress from the Malayalam film industry accused Vijay Babu of sexual and physical abuse over the past two months in the guise of friendship and guidance, and subsequently registered a criminal case which is currently being investigated. In response, he left India and is suspected to be in Dubai, with Indian police having issued a look out circular for him at the airports and planning to search his properties for evidence. In a Facebook Live stream four days later, Babu denied the accusations, claiming to be "the one who is suffering" and stating he would countersue for defamation. While his action received criticism, various men's rights groups came in support of him quoting the one-sided nature of law when it comes to such allegations. Activists like Rahul Easwar and Mithun Vijay Kumar announced MenToo movement on various platforms to protect the actor from media trials and demanded a gender-neutral form of justice. Notably, he named his accuser in the video despite knowing it is illegal under Indian law, leading to him additionally being charged under IPC Section 228A for violating the victim's anonymity and criticism from supporters of sexual assault survivors. While the internal complaint commission of the Association of Malayalam Movie Artists (AMMA) recommended that Babu be expelled, the organisation ultimately did not do so, instead accepting a letter from him distancing himself from the executive board. In response to this inaction, four members (Maala Parvathy, Cuckoo Parameswaran, Shweta Menon and Hareesh Peradi) criticized AMMA's stance and left the association.

== Filmography ==
Year	Film	Credited as			Notes
Year	Film	Actor	Producer	Role	Notes
1982	Sooryan	Yes			Child artist
2011	Three Kings	Yes		Himself	Cameo appearance
2012	22 Female Kottayam	Yes		Benny	
2012	Ayalum Njanum Thammil	Yes		DCP Ameer Muhammed	
2012	No. 66 Madhura Bus	Yes		DFO Ravichandran	
2012	Chapters	Yes		Kiran Das	
2012	Karmayodha				Dubbed for Rony David
2013	Honey Bee	Yes		SI George	
2013	Kili Poyi	Yes		Pandey	
2013	Zachariayude Garbhinikal		Yes		
2013	Philips and the Monkey Pen	Yes	Yes	Padmachandran	
2013	Escape from Uganda	Yes		Jayakrishnan	
2013	Bicycle Thieves	Yes		Kashinathan	
2014	Mr. Fraud	Yes		Abbas	
2014	Peruchazhi	Yes	Yes	Sunny Kurishingal	
2014	Tamaar Padaar	Yes		Purushan	
2015	Aadu Oru Bheegara Jeevi Aanu	Yes	Yes	SI Sarbath Shameer	
2015	Nee-Na	Yes		Vinay Panickar	
2015	Double Barrel	Yes		Billy Gang	
2015	Adi Kapyare Kootamani		Yes		
2016	Mudhugauv	Yes	Yes	Ramakrishna Bonachaud alias Rambo	
2016	Aakashvani	Yes		Akaashdas	
2016	Pretham	Yes		Commissioner Sam Alexander	
2016–2017	Home Minister		Yes		TV series on Amrita TV
2017	Angamaly Diaries		Yes		
2017	Careful	Yes		Commissioner Ajith Chandran	
2017	Oru Cinemakkaran	Yes		Sudheer	
2017	Velipadinte Pusthakam	Yes		Himself	Cameo appearance
2017	Overtake	Yes		Nandan	
2017	Lava Kusha	Yes		Cyril Abraham / Banglan	
2017	Ayal Jeevichirippundu	Yes		John Mathew Mathan	
2017	Crossroad	Yes		Joe	Segment: Pakshiyude Manam
2017	Sadrishyavakyam	Yes		Commissioner Binoy Idikula	
2017	Aadu 2	Yes	Yes	SI Sarbath Shameer	
2019	June		Yes		
2019	Mr. & Ms. Rowdy	Yes		Jeevan George	
2019	Janamaithri	Yes	Yes	Raphael	
2019	Shubharathri	Yes		CI Balachandran	
2019	Sullu	Yes		Kishore	
2019	Puzhikkadakan	Yes		Minister Avaran Pottakuzhi	
2019	Stand Up	Yes			
2019	Swarnamalsyangal	Yes			
2019	Thrissur Pooram	Yes	Yes	Commissioner Moorthy	
2019	Parchayee	Yes		Police Officer	
2020	Anveshanam	Yes		Dr. Gautham	
2020	Oru Vadakkan Pennu	Yes		Sivan	
2020	Sufiyum Sujathayum		Yes		
2021	Eighteen Hours	Yes			
2021	Home	Yes	Yes	Psychologist	
2021	Sunny	Yes		Advocate Paul	
2022	Anthakshari	Yes		Vasudevan	
2022	Keedam	Yes		CI Charles	
2022	Theerppu	Yes	Yes	Ram Kumar Nair	
2023	Maheshum Marutiyum	Yes			
2023	Pendulum	Yes		Dr. Mahesh Narayan	
2023	Valatty	Yes	Yes	Roy	
2024	Qalb		Yes		
2024	Oru Sarkar Ulpannam	Yes		Prosecution Advocate	
2024	Big Ben	Yes			
2024	Oru Anweshanathinte Thudakkam	Yes		Stephen	
2025	Dominic and the Ladies' Purse	Yes		Tony	
2025	Mother Mary	Yes		James	
2025	Padakkalam	Yes	Yes	Dr. S Shameer	Cameo appearance
2026	Aadu 3	Yes	Yes	SI Sarbath Shameer and Vareed Mappila	
2026	Vaazha II: Biopic of a Billion Bros	Yes		Mujeeb sir	
2026	Bharathanatyam 2 Mohiniyattam	Yes		Mohandas	
2026	Bouma	Yes			

== Awards ==
Kerala State Film Awards

- 2014 – Best Children's Film for Philips and the Monkey Pen

National Film Award

- 2021 – Best Malayalam Film Award for #Home
