= Vineeth Mohan =

Malayalam film actor

- വിനീത് മോഹൻ
- Born: Kollam, Kerala, India
- Education: Union Christian College, Aluva, Kendriya Vidyalaya N.A.D
- Occupation: Actor
- Years active: 2013–present
- Notable work: Aadu Oru Bheegara Jeeviyanu, Adi Kapyare Kootamani

Vineeth Mohan is a Malayalam film actor, he made his debut in Memories. He acted in Peruchazhi, Aadu, Aadu 2, Adi Kapyare Kootamani. He is more popular for his roles in Aadu, Adi Kapyare Kootamani and Aadu 2. He also acted with director Jeethu Joseph's debut short Ottamooli as co-actor.

== Personal life ==
Vineeth was born at Kollam, Kerala. He completed his schooling at Kendriya Vidhyalaya, Kalamassery and graduated with a BSc. degree in mathematics from Union Christian College, Aluva in 2010.

He was a bank employee in Syndicate Bank, and he resigned from the job to pursue a career in acting in 2013.

== Filmography ==
Year	Title	Role	Notes	Ref(s)
2013	Memories		Cameo	
2014	Peruchazhi	Mukesh's Driver		
2014	Oru Korean Padam	Shameer		
2015	Aadu	Kuttan Moonga		
2015	Akashavani	Sharath		
2015	Adi Kapyare Kootamani	Koshy		
2017	Thrissivaperoor Kliptham	Fr. Gregory Pauly		
2017	Cappuccino	Ratheesh		
2017	Aadu 2	Kuttan Moonga		
2019	Sullu	Suresh		
2020	Uriyadi	Rahul		
2021	The Last Two Days	Xavier Mathew		
2025	Adinaasam Vellapokkam	Benny Puthenkurish		

=== Short films ===
Year	Title	Director
2017	Kalki	Harish Mohan
2019	Ottamooli	Santhosh Lakshman
2020	Luttapi	Santhosh Lakshman

== Awards ==
Year	Award	Category	Title	Result	Ref(s)
2016	SIIMA Award for Best Male Debut – (Malayalam)	Adi Kapyare Kootamani	Nominated		
