= Srinda =

Indian actress, model, dubbing artist (born 1985)

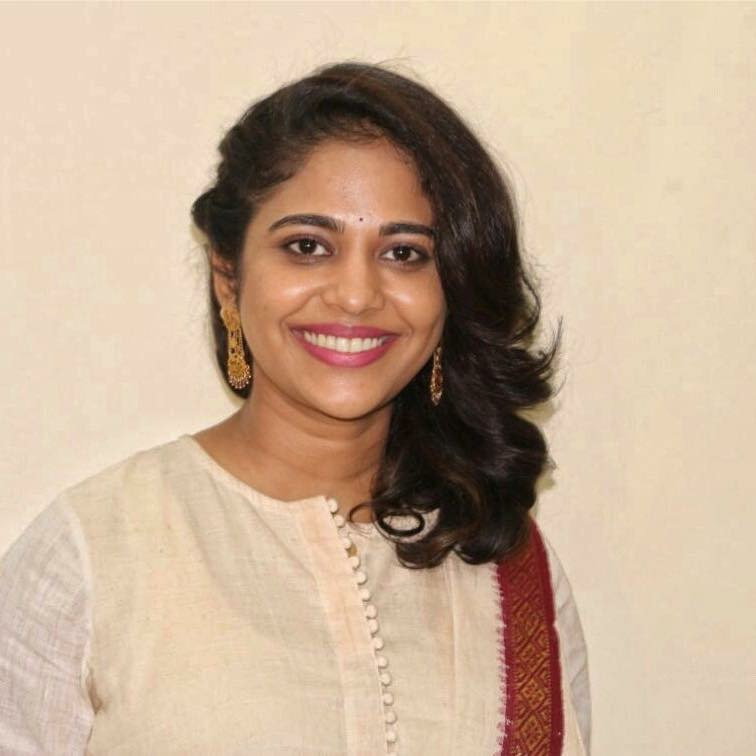
- Srinda in 2018
- Born: Srinda Mol; 20 August 1985 (age 41); Kochi, Kerala, India
- Other name: Srinda
- Occupation: Actress
- Years active: 2010–present
- Spouses: Ashab (m. 2004; div. 2014); Siju S. Bava (m. 2018)
- Children: 1

Srinda (born 20 August 1985) is an Indian actress who works predominantly in Malayalam cinema. Her debut film was Four Friends (2010). She is best known for her roles in Malayalam movies 22 Female Kottayam (2012), Annayum Rasoolum (2013), 1983 (2014), Freedom Fight (2022), Kuruthi (2021), Bheeshma Parvam (2022) and Aadu (2017).

== Career ==
Srinda attended St. Mary's Anglo Indian Girls High School, Fort Kochi, until Class 10 before transferring to a school in Palluruthy for Higher Secondary School Certificate studies. She later studied at the Sacred Heart College, Thevara.

Being passionate about films and photography since she was young, Srinda started her film career as an assistant director. She then briefly worked as a television anchor but felt her "heart wasn't in it. I felt like something was missing, which I found in films". Before appearing in a documentary, she modelled for products such as hair oils and jewellery brands. This eventually led her to feature films, where she was noticed by director Dileesh Nair, who introduced her to Aashiq Abu.

Even though her debut film was Four Friends (2010), Aashiq Abu's 22 Female Kottayam (2012) is considered her cinematic debut. She played the lead character's friend.^{[1]} Srinda stated that the film "shaped her as an actor". In the following months, she played supporting roles in several films, such as Thattathin Marayathu (2012), 101 Weddings (2012), North 24 Kaatham (2013), Artist (2013), and Annayum Rasoolum (2013). In 2014, Srinda played a notable lead role in the sports film 1983 (2014). Later that year, she portrayed a police officer in the political satire Masala Republic (2014), and starred in two films that were released on the same day, Tamaar Padaar (2014) and Homely Meals (2014).

== Personal life ==
Srinda got married at 19 and has a son from her first marriage. She got divorced and later married Siju. S. Bava in 2018.

== Filmography ==
Year	Title	Role	Notes
2010	Four Friends	Ayisha	Debut film
2012	22 Female Kottayam	Jinsy	
2012	Thattathin Marayathu	Sandhya	
2012	101 Weddings	Indira	
2013	Annayum Rasoolum	Fazila	
2013	Artist	Ruchi	
2013	North 24 Kaatham	Priya	
2014	1983	Susheela	
2014	Happy Journey	Aparna	
2014	Masala Republic	AGS Officer, Nagavally	
2014	Manglish	Mumtaz	
2014	Homely Meals	Nanditha	
2014	Tamaar Padaar	Valsamma	
2014	Vennila Veedu	Ilavarasi	Tamil film
2015	Aadu	Mary	
2015	Rasputin	Anu	
2015	Chirakodinja Kinavukal	Koottukari	
2015	Loham	Girl at the wedding	Cameo appearance
2015	Kunjiramayanam	Sajitha	
2015	Amar Akbar Anthony	Resmiya	
2015	Rani Padmini	Nandhini	
2015	Two Countries	Jessica	
2016	Mohavalayam	Mehru	
2016	Pinneyum	Sharada	
2016	Popcorn	Sharon	
2016	Marupadi	Anjana	
2017	Munthirivallikal Thalirkkumbol	Latha	Asianet Film Award for Best Supporting Actress
2017	Adventures of Omanakuttan	Mallika	
2017	Role Models	Christy	
2017	Njandukalude Nattil Oridavela	Mary Tony	Asianet Film Award for Best Supporting Actress
2017	Parava	Habeeba Hakeen	
2017	Sherlock Toms	Rekha Toms	Nominated – Filmfare Award for Best Supporting Actress – Malayalam; Asianet Film Award for Best Supporting Actress
2017	Crossroad	Passenger	Segment: Cherivu
2017	Chippy	Shobha	
2018	Aadu 2	Mary	
2018	Kuttanpillayude Sivarathri	Rajani	
2018	Sinjar	Fida	
2020	Trance	Latha	
2020	Paapam Cheyyathavar Kallariyatte	Susan	
2021	Sara's	Lissy	
2021	Kuruthi	Sumathi	
2022	Freedom Fight	Ashwathy	Anthology film
2022	Bheeshma Parvam	Rasiya	
2022	Kuttavum Shikshayum	Mukkan's wife	
2022	Panthrandu	Sicily	
2022	Mei Hoom Moosa	Suhara	
2023	Iratta	Minister Geetha Rajendran	
2023	Neeraja	Meera	
2023	Pappachan Olivilanu	Reena	
2024	Thappinchuku Thiruguvadu Dhanyudu Sumathi		Telugu film
2024	Bougainvillea	Rema	
2026	Aadu 3	Maharani Rohini	
2026	Bethlehem Kudumba Unit	Reshma Moreli	
2026	Udumbanchola Vision		

== As narrator and voice-over ==
Year	Title	Role	Notes
2019	Valiyaperunnal	—N/a	Voice only for rap in song "Kanda Kanda"

=== Dubbed ===
- Kammatipaadam (2016) – for Shaun Romy (Anitha)
- Thondimuthalum Driksakshiyum (2017) – for Nimisha Sajayan (Sreeja)
- Saudi Vellakka (2022) – for Dhanya Ananya (Naseema)

=== As technical crew member ===
- China Town (2011)
- Hero (2012)
- Casanovva (2012)
