= Sunny Wayne =

Indian film actor (born 1983)

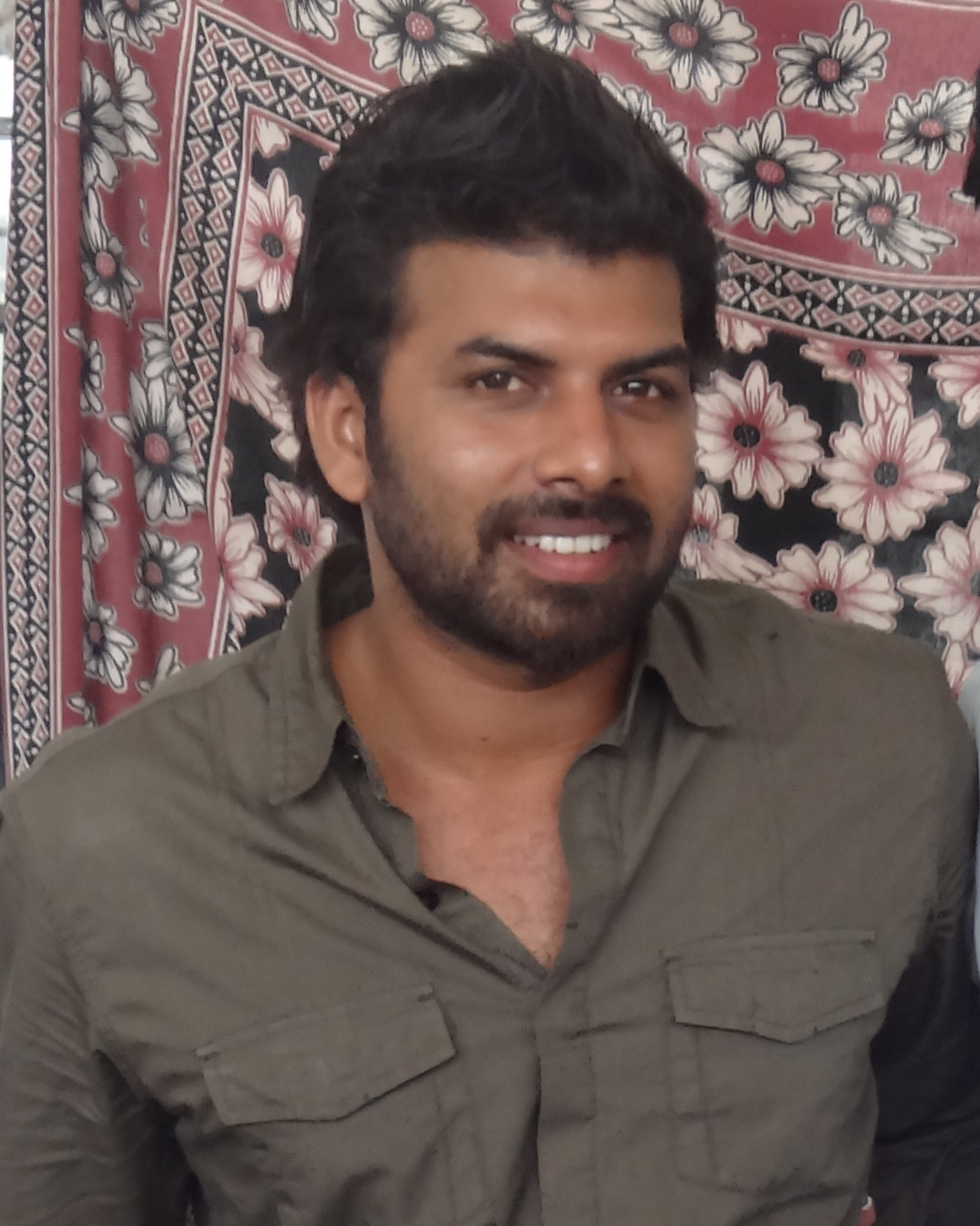
- Sunny Wayne on a shooting location in 2013
- Born: Sujith Unnikrishnan; 19 August 1983 (age 43); Wayanad, Kerala, India
- Education: Calicut University Institute of Engineering and Technology
- Occupations: Actor; producer
- Years active: 2012–present
- Spouse: Renjini T. H. (m. 2019)
- Parents: Unnikrishnan; Soumini

Sujith Unnikrishnan (born 19 August 1983), known by his stage name Sunny Wayne, is an Indian actor who predominantly works in Malayalam cinema in lead and supporting roles. He made his acting debut in Second Show (2012), in which Dulquer Salmaan played the main lead role.

== Personal life ==
Sujith Unnikrishnan was born to Unnikrishnan and Soumini in Wayanad, on 19 August 1983. He is an alumnus of Calicut University Institute of Engineering and Technology at Tenhipalam in Malappuram, Kerala. He married his longtime girlfriend Renjini at Guruvayoor Temple on 10 April 2019.

== Career ==
Sunny Wayne's first work was Second Show which was released in 2012. Indiaglitz.com praised Wayne's portrayal of Kurudi. After that he did a cameo appearance in Vineeth Sreenivasan's musical-romance film Thattathin Marayathu. In 2013, Wayne played a supporting character in Rajeev Ravi's Annayum Rasoolum. He portrayed Rasool's friend Ashley and narrator of the story. The Sify.com reviewer stated "Sunny Wayne underlines why he is regarded as one of the most talented actors to have happened to Malayalam cinema during recent times and his narration sets the mood very well." Wayne went on to play the cosmetic surgeon Roshan in Nee Ko Njaa Cha directed by debutant Gireesh. The Times of India wrote "Sunny Wayne throws himself into the character of Dr Roshan, a seasoned playboy with calm elegance. He looks sleek, stylish and sometimes genuinely funny." He then starred in Neelakasham Pachakadal Chuvanna Bhoomi, directed by Sameer Thahir. He portrayed the character Satan Xavier in the film Aadu, directed by Midhun Manuel Thomas. The following year, his character in the film Annmariya Kalippilannu (2016) was well acclaimed by the audience. He portrayed the role of Vijay fan in Pokkiri Simon (2017). Wayne made his Tamil debut with Gypsy.

In 2018, he launched a production company named Sunny Wayne Productions, which produced a theatre drama titled Moment Just Before Death. It produced 2 films: Padavettu, starring Nivin Pauly and Appan, starring himself.

== Filmography ==
Key
†	Denotes films that have not yet been released

=== As actor ===
Year	Title	Role	Notes
2012	Second Show	Kurudi	
2012	Thattathin Marayathu	Majeed	
2013	Nee Ko Njaa Cha	Dr.Roshan Fenwickman	
2013	Annayum Rasoolum	Ashley	
2013	Neelakasham Pachakadal Chuvanna Bhoomi	Suni	
2013	Chewing Gum	Dinu	
2014	Raktharakshassu 3D	Nandan	
2014	Mosayile Kuthira Meenukal	Akbar Ali	
2014	Masala Republic	Bada Bhai	
2014	Koothara	Ram	
2015	Aadu Oru Bheegara Jeeviyanu	Satan Xavier and Abraham Xavier	Dual roles
2015	Saradhi	Christy	
2015	Candle Camera	Citizen journalist	
2015	Appavum Veenjum	Jude (Freddy Peter George)	
2015	Double Barrel	Silent	
2015	Vizhiyil	Sunny	
2015	Lord Livingstone 7000 Kandi	Bheeran	
2016	Annmariya Kalippilannu	Poombatta Gireesh	
2017	Alamara	Arun	
2017	Avarude Raavukal	Sunny	Cameo appearance
2017	Gold Coins	Katha	
2017	Pokkiri Simon	Simon	
2017	Chembarathipoo	Dr. Nandan	Cameo appearance
2017	Aadu 2	Sathan Xavier	
2018	Kayamkulam Kochunni	Keshava Kurup	
2018	Oru Kuttanadan Blog	Gopan	
2018	French Viplavam	Sathyan	
2019	June	Alex	Cameo appearance
2019	My Santa	Eby Mathew	
2020	Gypsy	Balan	Tamil film
2020	Maniyarayile Ashokan	Ajayan	Cameo appearance; Netflix film
2021	Black Coffee	Davis	
2021	Anugraheethan Antony	Antony	
2021	Chathur Mukham	Antony	
2021	Sara's	Jeevan	Amazon Prime Video film
2021	Pidikittapulli	Shambu	Jio Cinema film
2021	Kurup	Peter	
2022	Aquarium	Father Shibu	
2022	Kuttavum Shikshayum	CPO Rajesh Mathew	
2022	Adithattu	Marcos	
2022	Varall	Officer	
2022	Padavettu	Pradeep	Cameo appearance
2022	Appan	Njoonju	SonyLIV film
2022	Padachone Ingalu Kaatholee	C. H. Raghunandan	
2023	Kasargold	Faisal	
2023	Kannur Squad	Reghu	Cameo appearance
2023	Vela	SI Mallikarjunan	
2024	Perumani	Mujeeb	
2024	Turbo	Vimal	Cameo appearance
2024	Golam	Gibson George	50th film
2024	Thrayam	Harry	
2024	Turkish Tharkkam	CI Roopesh	
2025	Written & Directed by God	God	
2025	Nancy Rani	Sunny	Cameo appearance
2025	Lokah Chapter 1: Chandra	Kadamattathu Kathanar	Cameo appearance
2025	The Pet Detective	Timmychan	Cameo appearance
2025	Paathirathri	Ansar Ali	
2026	Aadu 3	Saathan Xavier and Walter Joseph	Dual roles

=== As producer ===
Year	Film	Director	Banner	Notes
2022	Padavettu	Liju Krishna	Sunny Wayne Productions	
2022	Appan	Maju	Sunny Wayne Productions	SonyLIV film

=== As dubbing artist ===
- Ezra – dubbed for Sujith Shankar
- Valatty – Bruno (voice)

=== Short film ===
- Binary Error as Sunny Thomas

=== Web series ===
Year	Title	Role	Language	Notes	Ref.
2024	Perilloor Premier League	Sreekuttan	Malayalam	Disney+ Hotstar	
