= Sudhi Koppa =

Indian film actor

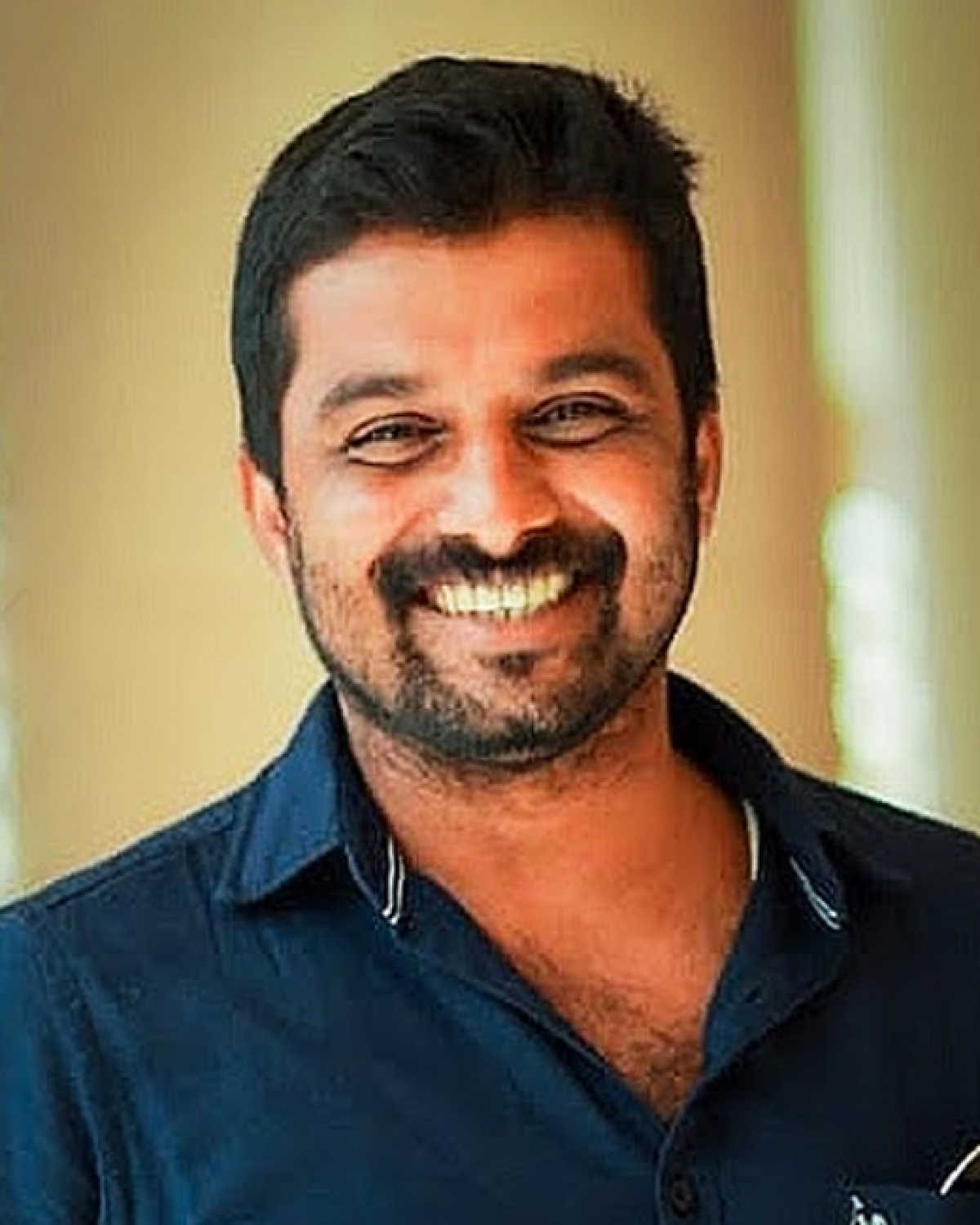
- Born: Kochi, Kerala, India
- Occupation: Actor
- Years active: 2011–present

Sudhi Koppa is an Indian actor who appears in Malayalam films. He made his cinematic debut in 2009 with an uncredited appearance in Sagar Alias Jacky Reloaded (2009).

== Personal life ==
Sudhi hails from Kochi. His father, who was a government officer had a passion towards drama and owned a drama troupe. Sudhi also started off as a theatre artist at Vaikom Thirunal Theatre Group, before forming his own drama troupe called 'Creative Theatre Group'.

== Career ==
Sudhi started off doing small roles in multi-starer movies. He played one of the goons, attacking Bhavana in Sagar Alias Jacky Reloaded and one of the students in Seniors (2011). His theater background helped him secure a role in Lijo Jose Pellissery's Amen. He played the role of Solomon's friend Sebastian, who tries to woo Solomon's sister played by Rachana Narayanankutty. He then played many more small roles in Manglish and Sapthamashree Thaskaraha (2014).

His breakthrough came in Aadu (2015), in which he played "Kanjavu" Soman. The double-crossing Soman served as an important link between the different story tracks in the movie. He subsequently played an important role as the naive Unni in You Too Brutus (2015).

2016 saw a string of releases in which he had good roles. He played Darwin's henchman Appunni in Darvinte Parinamam (2015). He was then seen as Hari and Manu's friend Paul Achayan in Happy Wedding (2016). He then portrayed the alcoholic Thanka in Anuraga Karikkin Vellam (2016), who gets into fights with Abhi and friends. He also essayed the role of a comical thief, Kaimal aka Kai in Sajid Yahiya's directorial debut IDI: Inspector Dawood Ibrahim (2016). He was last seen as one of Asif Ali's teammates in Kavi Uddheshichathu..? (2016).

He is currently working on Third World Boys, a road movie and Theeram. He is also playing a major role in Avarude Raavukal (2017), starring Asif Ali (actor) and Unni Mukundan, and directed by Shanil Muhammed, who had earlier co-directed Philips and the Monkey Pen (2013). He also acted in a small role alongside superstar Manju Warrier in Udaharanam Sujatha (2017), which brought him lot of praise and went on to be a critical and commercial success.

== Filmography ==
Key
†	Denotes films that have not yet been released

Year	Title	Role	Notes
2009	Sagar Alias Jacky Reloaded	Babu	Uncredited Role
2009	Robin Hood	Anil	
2010	Mummy & Me	College Student	Uncredited Role
2011	Seniors	College Student	
2013	North 24 Kaatham	Toddy Shop Patron	
2013	Amen	Sebastian	
2014	Manglish	Sahadevan	
2014	Sapthamashree Thaskaraha	Gee Varghese	
2015	Aadu	Kanjavu Soman	
2015	You Too Brutus	Unni	
2015	Love 24x7	Joshy	
2015	KL 10 Patthu	Nizam	
2015	Lord Livingstone 7000 Kandi	Kakapool	
2015	Sahapadi 1975	Vinayan	
2016	Darvinte Parinamam	Appunni	
2016	Happy Wedding	Paul	
2016	Oru Murai Vanthu Parthaya	Kochukuttan	
2016	Anuraga Karikkin Vellam	Thanka	
2016	Guppy	Chink Divakar	
2016	IDI: Inspector Dawood Ibrahim	Kaimal	
2016	Dum	Sumesh	
2016	Kavi Udheshichathu..?	Dineshan	
2017	Alamara	Justin	
2017	Lakshyam	Lock Lalu	
2017	Udaharanam Sujatha	Jayan	
2017	Oru Mexican Aparatha	Lonappan	
2017	Chicken Kokkachi	Azharudeen	
2017	Paippin Chuvattile Pranayam	Ayyappan	
2017	Avarude Raavukal	Shanil Muhammed	
2017	Theeram	Venu	
2017	Aadu 2	Kanjavu Soman	
2018	Eeda	Thulaseedharan	
2018	Padayottam	Renju	
2018	Joseph	Sudhi Kaippuzha	
2019	Vaarikkuzhiyile Kolapathakam	Jokkuttan	
2019	Unda	Police Officer	Cameo appearance
2019	Sathyam Paranja Viswasikkuvo	Thamara	
2019	Porinju Mariam Jose	Disco Babu	
2019	Vikruthi	Bineesh	
2019	Puzhikkadakan	O. Santhanam	
2020	Kappela	Benny	
2020	Love	Anoop's Friend	
2021	Malik	Tea Shop Owner	
2021	Ajagajantharam	Pindy	
2021	No Man's Land	Ahmed	
2022	Randu	Shamsudeen	
2022	Veyil		
2022	Antakshari	SI Sreenivas	
2022	Third World Boys		
2022	Priyan Ottathilanu	Shameer	
2022	Dhuniyavinte Orattath		
2022	Ela Veezha Poonchira	Sudhi	
2022	Jallianwala Bagh		
2022	Sabaash Chandra Bose		
2022	Mukundan Unni Associates	Adv. Robin Thazhatthu	
2023	Aalankam		
2023	Pulli		
2024	Nadanna Sambhavam	Lincoln	
2024	Pattapakal		
2024	Pallotty 90's Kids	Biju	
2025	Rekhachithram	Sajeevan	
2025	Idi Mazha Kaattu		
2025	Ronth		
2025	Meesha	Imod	
2026	Koodothram		
2026	Aadu 3	Kanjavu Soman	
2026	I, Nobody	Bank Robber	
2026	Avaraachan & Sons		
