= Tito Wilson =

Indian film actor

- Education: University of Calicut School of Drama and Fine Arts, Thrissur
- Occupation: Actor
- Years active: 2017–present

Tito Wilson is an Indian actor who appears in Malayalam films. He made his debut in the 2017 film Angamaly Diaries in which he played the role of U-Clamp Rajan.

== Personal life ==
Tito Wilson was born in Thrissur, Kerala, to a middle class family. Growing up he always wanted to become an actor. Coming from a middle class family, he realized his path to becoming an actor should start from learning acting and thus he joined a Drama School.

== Career ==
While attending drama school, Wilson had given many auditions for movies, but none of them came through. During the final stage of school, he gave an audition for a role in the movie Angamaly Diaries. After giving the audition to Chemban Vinod Jose, the writer and Lijo Jose Pellissery, the director of the movie, he was selected to play the role of U-Clamp Rajan, a villainous character, along with Appani Sarath. He was one of the 86 actors who debuted in that movie. He received several accolades for his natural acting while playing U-Clamp Rajan.

Wilson appeared in the 2017 film Pokkiri Simon directed by Jijo Antony and in the same year appeared in Swathandriam Ardharathriyil, an action thriller directed by Tinu Pappachan. He played the character of Udayan, a jail inmate.

He also acted in the film Maradona alongside actor Tovino Thomas who plays the lead role, directed by Vishnu Narayan.

His first project as the lead role would be in Aaliyante Radio.

Apart from doing movies, Wilson has also appeared in many stage and talk shows including Comedy Super Nite 3 on Flowers TV Channel and John Brittas Show on Kairali TV.

== Filmography ==
| Year | Title | Role | Director |
|---|---|---|---|
| 2017 | Angamaly Diaries | U-Clamp Rajan | Lijo Jose Pellissery |
| 2017 | Pokkiri Simon | Indran | Jijo Antony |
| 2018 | Swathandriam Ardharathriyil | Udayan | Tinu Pappachan |
| 2018 | Maradona | Sudhi | Vishnu Narayan |
| 2018 | Thanaha | TBA | Prakash Kunjhan |
| 2019 | Aaliyante Radio | TBA | Shreedev Kapoor |
| 2019 | Kollavarsham 1975 | TBA | Sajin K Surendran |
| 2019 | Kumbarees | John | Sagar Hari |
| 2020 | Love FM | Gafoor Bapootty | Sreedev Kappur |
| 2021 | Ajagajantharam | Kottappuram Surendran | Tinu Paapachan |
