= Chaaver =

2023 Indian film directed by Tinu Pappachan

- Theatrical release poster
- Directed by: Tinu Pappachan
- Written by: Joy Mathew
- Produced by: Arun Narayan; Venu Kunnapilly
- Starring: Kunchacko Boban; Arjun Ashokan; Antony Varghese
- Cinematography: Jinto George
- Edited by: Nishadh Yusuf
- Music by: Justin Varghese
- Production companies: Arun Narayan Productions; Kavya Film Company
- Release date: 5 October 2023
- Running time: 128 minutes
- Country: India
- Language: Malayalam

Chaaver (transl. Suicide Squad) is a 2023 Indian Malayalam-language political action thriller film directed by Tinu Pappachan and written by Joy Mathew. It is produced by Arun Narayan and Venu Kunnapilly under the banners Arun Narayan Productions and Kavya Film Company. The film stars Kunchacko Boban, Arjun Ashokan and Antony Varghese. The music was composed by Justin Varghese, the cinematography handled by Jinto George and editing by Nishadh Yusuf.

Chaaver was released on 5 October 2023 to mixed reviews from critics and bombed at the box office.

== Plot ==
Ashokan, Musthafa, Asif and Thomas are political goons who are on the run after being involved in a problem. Musthafa calls and requests Arun, a medical student and the son of a late veteran communist party leader, to provide first aid to Ashokan as he was apparently injured while trying to fix their jeep. Arun takes his friend Sooraj's bike and reaches the location with some first-aid provisions. Before helping Ashokan, Arun asks Musthafa and Ashokan about the nature of his injuries as he does not believe they were caused while trying to fix any vehicle, but he does not get a proper answer from either of them. They promise to leave Arun after he is done applying the first-aid. During all these events it is also shown that Ashokan is getting instructions from GK, a party leader.

They stop the jeep at a secret location to avoid being seen by anyone while the first-aid is being applied, but they spot a group of Theyyam performers coming towards them and immediately leave the location. They reach a house and rest there for the time being as they have lunch. Arun refuses to eat with them as he is scared and doesn't know about the happenings. As they are having lunch, Arun overhears Ashokan's conversation between others and understands that they are on the run after killing a Theyyam performer named Kiran. Arun later asks Musthafa about killing Kiran, where Musthafa replies that it was all for the party.

The murder of Kiran leads to protests all over the town and the police are actively on the hunt for the murder suspects.

Later, GK calls Ashokan and tells him that the police are tracing their whereabouts and they need to leave their current location immediately. Before leaving, Thomas tries to dispose the remaining bomb by throwing it into a well, but the bomb blasts inside the well, creating further problems. The police capture Sooraj and start questioning him as his bike was present near the location where Kiran was killed, but Sooraj tells that he is unaware of what happened and refuses to reveal Arun's name to the police. Arun manages to escape the place when the bomb blasts and reaches a house, where he asks a person living there for some water.

Meanwhile, Ashokan and the others get worried that Arun might reveal their details to the police and set out to find him. They find him after sometime and take him with them. Musthafa reveals to Arun that he is now at risk of being a suspect. Later that night, Ashokan calls another party leader Mukundan and tells him to make some other people surrender to the police or he will be forced to reveal all the other political killings he has done for the party. Asif and Thomas then split from the group and leave home. Ashokan, Musthafa and Arun drive to a hideout situated in a hilly region and decides to stay there until GK sends his henchmen over to the police station. In the background Mukundan calls GK and tells him that he will take of everything. It is then shown that Asif while returning home is killed in a hit and run accident .

Musthafa takes Arun and goes outside to make a call and learns that he and Ashokan were used by GK to kill Kiran as his daughter was in relationship with Kiran, who is from a lower caste. Thinking Ashokan is also in on this, Musthafa instructs Arun to run away and confronts Ashokan but they are shot at by an unknown assailant. At the same time, Ashokan also gets to know from another party sympathiser about the treachery committed by GK and decides to leave the place. As he is about to leave, GK's henchmen surround the house and shoot at him. Musthafa who got separated from Arun reaches the house and somehow gets inside as the henchemen shoot at it. Picking up a hunting rifle from one of the rooms, Musthafa meets up with Ashokan who reveals that he was also cheated by GK. Suddenly one of the stray bullets hits Musthafa in his shoulder. Ashokan then picks up the rifle and starts shooting back at the henchmen. He manages to shoot them down but he and Musthafa get critically injured in the process. At that time, Arun who was being chased by another henchman, manages to lose him and gets back to the house. Seeing him, Ashokan gives the keys of the jeep to Arun and tells him to leave them be and escape from there. Ashokan and Musthafa succumb to their own injuries, while Arun successfully escapes from the hilly region after the henchman who was chasing him gets blown up after hitting an electrified fence.

== Cast ==
- Kunchacko Boban as Ashokan
- Arjun Ashokan as Arun
- Antony Varghese as Kiran Kumar
- Manoj K. U. as Musthafa
- Sajin Gopu as Asif
- Anuroop P. as Thomas
- Deepak Parambol as Sooraj
- Joy Mathew as Mukundan
- Sangita Madhavan Nair as Devi teacher
- Arun Narayanan as Gireesh
- Rajesh Sharma as SI Renjith Babu
- Anand Balan as Commissioner
- Murukan Martin as DYSP Biju Ayyappan
- Jayaraj Calicut as Chamunni
- Krishna Priya as Kiran Kumar's Lover and GK Nambiar's Daughter
- Renji Panicker as G. K. Nambiar (voice appearance)

== Production ==
=== Development ===
Chaaver marks the third directorial of Tinu Pappachan after Swathanthryam Ardharathriyil (2018) and Ajagajantharam (2021). The film is produced by Arun Narayanan and Venu Kunnapilly under the banners of Arun Narayanan Productions and Kavya Films. It also marks Tinu Pappachan's third collaboration with Antony Varghese and the first collaboration with Kunchacko Boban.

== Soundtrack ==
Chaaver

Soundtrack album by Justin Varghese
- Released: 2023
- Recorded: 2023
- Studios: Bodhi Silent Scape, Ernakulam; NHQ Studio, Ernakulam; People’s Studio, Payyannur
- Genre: Feature film soundtrack
- Length: 19:30
- Language: Malayalam
- Label: Think Music
- Producer: Justin Varghese

Justin Varghese chronology
Christopher (2023)	Chaaver (2023)	Ponman (2025)

The film's songs and score are composed by Justin Varghese. The lyrics for the songs were written by Hareesh Mohanan.

No.	Title	Singer(s)	Length
1.	"Polika Polika"	Govind Vasantha, Baby Jean, Santhosh Varma	04:44
2.	"Poomale Pothiyamme"	Pranav C. P., Niranjana Rema	05:06
3.	"Chenthamara"	Pranav C. P., Santhosh Varma	03:57
4.	"Chenthamara End Credit Version"	Pranav C. P., Santhosh Varma	05:43
Total length:			19:30

== Release ==
=== Theatrical ===
The release date of Chaaver was postponed several times. The film was initially planned to release on 20 July 2023. The release date was later pushed to 21 September 2023 and then to 28 September. Prior to its release, the film was given a U/A certificate by the Censor Board. The film was released on 5 October 2023.

=== Home media ===
SonyLIV acquired the digital rights of the film. It premiered on 24 November 2023. The satellite rights of the film is acquired by Amrita TV and will premiere on the occasion of Onam 2025.

== Reception ==
=== Box office ===
The film earned $58,913 in the United Arab Emirates, $1,815 in New Zealand and $1,390 in Australia.

=== Critical response ===
S. R. Praveen of The Hindu wrote "Chaaver shows why mere technical excellence cannot make a film work. All of Tinu Pappachan's craft could not save a poorly-written film." Anandu Suresh of The Indian Express gave 2 out of 5 stars and wrote "Tinu Pappachan's Chaaver, starring Kunchacko Boban in the lead role, explores violence stemming from political rivalry. However, the film's aestheticisation of violence does not align with its central theme." Cris of The News Minute gave 2.5 out of 5 stars and wrote "What helps 'Chaver' stand apart though is Tinu Pappachan's treatment of it, which is as raw as it is aesthetic."

Gopika ls of The Times of India gave 2.5 out of 5 stars and wrote "Chaaver is a movie that stands out because of its making. Even with a weak script, the film works because of how the scenes are planned and the refreshing frames. It's not really a new story, but the presentation and the fantasy elements make it a watchable film." Nirmal Jovial of The Week gave 3 out of 5 stars and wrote "A tightly woven and more engaging third act would have taken Chaaver to the next level. It's highly probable that the film may face criticism, especially upon its release on OTT platforms." Princy Alexander of Onmanorama wrote "Despite the finesse in filmmaking, the script, which boldly explores how party leaders use their workers as pawns, at times is a letdown."

Vishal Menon of Film Companion wrote "It's as though the film only works in an abstract form with the characters not amounting to any real feeling." Sajin Shrijith of Cinema Express gave 2.5 out of 5 stars and wrote "Tinu Pappachan's obsession with good-looking frames often reaches self-indulgent, near-fetishistic heights." Neelima Menon of OTTPlay gave 2 out of 5 stars and wrote "Chaaver's promising premise is let down by its tiresome, weakly written narrative, executed by a woefully self-indulgent filmmaker."
