= Daveed (film) =

2025 Indian film

- Theatrical release poster
- Directed by: Govind Vishnu
- Written by: Deepu Rajeevan; Govind Vishnu
- Produced by: Century Max John & Mary Productions; Panorama Studios; Aby Alex Abhraham; Tom Joseph
- Starring: Antony Varghese; Lijomol Jose; Vijayaraghavan
- Cinematography: Salu K. Thomas
- Edited by: Rakesh Cherumadam
- Music by: Justin Varghese
- Production companies: Century Max John & Mary Productions; Panorama Studios
- Distributed by: Century Films (India)
- Release date: 14 February 2025
- Running time: 150 minutes
- Country: India
- Language: Malayalam
- Budget: ₹9 crore

Daveed is a 2025 Indian Malayalam-language action film directed by Govind Vishnu (in his directorial debut) and written by Deepu Rajeevan and Govind Vishnu. It is produced by Aby Alex Abraham, Tom Joseph, Century Max John & Mary Productions and Panorama Studios. The films stars Antony Varghese, Lijomol Jose, Vijayaraghavan, Saiju Kurup and Kichu Tellus in supporting roles.

The film was officially announced on 23 November, 2023. Principal Photography commenced on 24 June 2024, in Thrissur, Ernakulam, and Kottayam. The film's songs and original score were by Justin Varghese. The film received generally positive reviews from critics.

== Plot ==
Ashiq Abu, a middle-aged bouncer, faces a life-changing rivalry with Turkish boxer Sainul Akhmedov.

== Cast ==
- Antony Varghese as Aashiq Abu
- Mo Ismail as Sainul Akhmadov
- Lijomol Jose as Sherin
- Saiju Kurup as Kochappa
- Vijayaraghavan as Raghavan Aashaan
- Aju Varghese as Sam Puthekkadan
- Kichu Tellus as Tytus
- Jess Kukku as Safa
- Ramesh
- Mohan
- Narayanan
- Bibin
- Sandra
- Deepu Rajeevan
- Michael Igwe as Cuban Boxer 1
- Dinil as Cuban Boxer 2
- Anna Rajan as Herself (cameo)

== Production ==
=== Development ===
The film marks the directorial debut of Govind Vishnu. On 15 June 2024, he announced his collaboration with Antony Varghese and Lijomol Jose for the project, revealing that the script would be co-written by Deepu Rajeevan. The film is set to be produced by John & Mary Productions, Panorama Studios, Aby Alex Abhraham, and Tom Joseph.

The cinematography will be handled by Salu K. Thomas. The film's visuals and pacing are supervised by editor Rakesh Cherumadam.

=== Casting ===
Antony Varghese signed on for Daveed with director Govind Vishnu. The team has announced that Lijomol Jose, Vijayaraghavan, Saiju Kurup, and Kichu Tellus are in the cast. The film will also feature Aju Varghese, Jess Kukku, Nileen Sandra, Mo Ismail, Bibin Perumbally, Ajith Narayanan, Deepu Mohan, and Ramesh Kozhikode in key roles. Additionally, the director has revealed that the movie will introduce several new faces.

=== Filming ===
Principal photography began on 24 June, 2024, with a puja ceremony. The first schedule lasted over 55 days, concluding on 18 August 2024. Filming took place in and around Ernakulam and Kottayam. The second schedule was held from 7 to 22 October, with shooting in Thrissur.

== Marketing ==
The film was announced with a motion title poster that introduced the cast, accompanied by music from Justin Varghese. The first look poster, featuring Antony Varghese as Abu, a boxer, was released on 11 October 2024. The full cast was later revealed through social media posts. Promotional activities for the film began in early October, though the trailer is yet to be released. Director Govind Vishnu confirmed via his social media that Daveed will hit theaters in February.

== Music ==
The music and original background score for this film were composed by Justin Varghese. The music rights for the film have been sold to Think Music.

== Release ==
=== Theatrical ===
The film was released theatrically on 14 February 2025.

=== Home media ===
The digital streaming rights of the film is acquired by ZEE5 and started streaming from 18 April 2025.

== Reception ==
Gopika Is of TimesofIndia gave the film a 3.5 out of 5 rating mentioning "Debutant director Govind Vishnu's Daveed is a well-made, entertaining sports drama. The film, given its genre, could have ended up being very predictable—and it is, to an extent—but the execution and the journey to these plot points are what make Daveed an engrossing experience". Swathi P Ajith of Onmanorama gave the film a positive review saying "The film may not have the scale of a Hollywood sports drama, but the effort put into it, the work behind the scenes, and Pepe's strong performance hold it together. While it keeps things grounded, the film delivers where it matters, making it a worthy watch in theaters".

== See also ==
- List of boxing films
