= Jallikattu (2019 film) =

2019 film directed by Lijo Jose Pellissery

- Theatrical release poster
- Directed by: Lijo Jose Pellissery
- Written by: S. Hareesh; R. Jayakumar
- Based on: Maoist by S. Hareesh
- Produced by: O. Thomas Panicker
- Starring: Antony Varghese; Chemban Vinod Jose; Sabumon Abdusamad
- Cinematography: Girish Gangadharan
- Edited by: Deepu S. Joseph
- Music by: Prashant Pillai
- Production companies: Opus Penta; Kasargod Pictures; Chembosky Motion Pictures
- Distributed by: Friday Film House
- Release dates: 6 September 2019 (TIFF); 4 October 2019 (India)
- Running time: 95 minutes
- Country: India
- Language: Malayalam

Jallikattu is a 2019 Indian Malayalam-language independent action thriller film directed by Lijo Jose Pellissery with a screenplay by S. Hareesh and R. Jayakumar. The film stars Antony Varghese, Chemban Vinod Jose, Sabumon Abdusamad and Santhy Balachandran. In the film, a bull escapes from a slaughterhouse in a hilly remote village and the villagers set out to capture or kill it.

Jallikattu premiered on 6 September 2019 at the 2019 Toronto International Film Festival and received widespread critical acclaim. The film was showcased at the 24th Busan International Film Festival under the section "A Window on Asian Cinema". It was released in the home state Kerala on 4 October 2019. Lijo Jose Pellissery received the Silver Peacock-Best Director trophy at the 50th International Film Festival of India. It was selected as the Indian entry for the Best International Feature Film at the 93rd Academy Awards, but it was not nominated. It was third Malayalam film after Guru and Adaminte Makan Abu to be chosen as India's official entry to the Oscars. It was included in The Hindu's top 25 Malayalam films of the decade and is widely regarded as one of the defining movies of the New Wave Movement.

== Plot ==
Kalan Varkey is a butcher in a rural village in Kerala who meets with his assistant Antony before dawn each day to slaughter a buffalo and prepare its meat for sale in the market. One morning a buffalo slips its bindings, escaping into the hilly forest. Soon after a large haystack is set ablaze and the entire village wakes up to put out the fire. Hearing of the buffalo's escape, and believing that it was responsible, the men of the village begin an urgent hunt for the animal. As the day progresses the villagers repeatedly try and fail to corner and kill the buffalo. The crops at a rubber plantation are trampled, a drink vendor's cart is smashed, and the village's bank and convenience store are both destroyed. The villagers begin to turn on Varkey, blaming him for the destruction.

Meanwhile, the police refuse to help as killing cattle is illegal. They merely warn people to stay inside until the buffalo is caught. The frustrated villagers seek the help of Kuttachan, a renowned local poacher. Antony is unhappy to see Kuttachan back in the village; in a flashback it is revealed that the two men previously rivals for the affections of Varkey's sister Sophie. Antony got Kuttachan arrested by informing the police that Kuttachan was stealing sandalwood from the local church. As Kuttachan prepares for the hunt by chopping up a metal bucket handle into pieces of buckshot, the villagers argue over which of them deserves to land the killing blow on the buffalo.

Elsewhere in the village, the disruption—both from the buffalo's rampage and the hunt—spreads further, causing other personal and social issues to come to the surface. Law and order begins to break down, with some of the men setting off fireworks and committing random acts of vandalism. Kuriachan, a wealthy man who had been planning an elaborate feast of buffalo dishes for his daughter's wedding, ventures out to try and find some chicken instead. He is seized by a group of workers who strip him naked and bring him to the hunt as a good luck trophy. Kuriachan's daughter tries to elope with her boyfriend, but a neighbour catches and scolds her.

After night falls, the buffalo is found at the bottom of a well. Antony takes credit, insisting that chasing it into the well had been his plan all along. Kuttachan wants to shoot it, but Antony demands that they bring it back to the surface first so that he and Varkey can still slaughter it and sell the meat. Varkey is indifferent, taking a nap as the others argue. The men construct a scaffold and lower Antony down so he can attach ropes around the buffalo's legs and neck. However, it begins raining heavily—the ropes slip off when the buffalo reaches the top, and as it thrashes around one of the villagers is thrown down the well and killed. The buffalo escapes again into the forest. Kuttachan and the other villagers blame Antony for the man's death.

By this point, the villagers are desperate and frantic. In-fighting leads to the men splintering into smaller groups, each with its own plan—and with each man desperate to be the one to finally claim the kill. Furious that a police officer is still refusing to help, one group set his patrol car on fire. As the men string up ropes, chains, and nets around the perimeter of the village, forcing the buffalo into a smaller and smaller area, night falls and the situation becomes increasingly chaotic and confusing. Antony and Kuttachan stumble across each other in a clearing in the dark forest and begin fighting. Kuttachan pins Antony and prepares to kill him, but the buffalo suddenly emerges from the undergrowth. Kuttachan catches it by its horns and asks Antony to hold its legs, but Antony uses the opportunity to stab Kuttachan multiple times, fatally wounding him—and also allowing the buffalo to escape again.

Antony and the remaining villagers chase it towards the river and across a bridge, where it becomes stuck in deep mud. Antony stabs the buffalo and screams to the crowd of hunters that he deserves the credit for killing it. This kicks off a desperate pile-on, as dozens of men—holding lit torches and bearing crude weapons—jump on top of each other, stabbing both the animal and each other as they form a huge, writhing mass. The screen fades to black, then fades back in to a final shot of a group of prehistoric men, wearing loincloths and carrying spears, racing each other through the dark in pursuit of a buffalo.

== Cast ==
- Antony Varghese as Antony
- Chemban Vinod Jose as Kalan Varkey
- Sabumon Abdusamad as Kuttachan
- Jaffar Idukki as Kuriachan
- Santhy Balachandran as Sophie
- Tinu Pappachan as Sub Inspector of Police
- Thomman Kunju as Planter Patrose
- Rajkumar as Bangladeshi Bhai
- Prasanth as Sunny
- Soniya as Omana

== Music ==
The film score was produced by Prashant Pillai.

Jallikkattu

Film score by Prashant Pillai
- Released: September 6, 2019 (TIFF) October 4, 2019
- Recorded: 2019
- Genres: Orchestra, World Music
- Language: Malayalam
- Label: Opus Penta with Friday Film House
- Producer: Prashant Pillai

Prashant Pillai chronology
Unda (2019)	Jallikkattu (2019)	Ranarangam (2019)

== Release ==
=== Theatrical ===
The official trailer of the film was unveiled by Friday Film House on 28 September 2019. Jallikattu was premiered at Toronto International Film Festival 2019. It was theatrically released on 4 October 2019 in Kerala.

=== Home media ===
Jallikattu was released on streaming service Amazon Prime Video on 4 February 2020. A Telugu dubbed version with same title was released on Aha.

== Reception ==
=== Critical response ===
On the review aggregator website Rotten Tomatoes, 96% of 25 critics' reviews are positive, with an average rating of 7.6/10. The website's consensus reads: "Jallikattu uses a violent conflict between man and animal to set the stage for a story that's as visually haunting as it is rich in subtext." Sajesh Mohan of Onmanorama wrote "After Ee.Ma.Yau., Lijo Jose Pellissery has again opted to saunter through the innate nature of humans in an off-kilter manner. The movie's technical brilliance is something that Mollywood can flaunt for a long time to come."

=== Box office ===
The film grossed ₹7.3 crores in its first week run in Kerala and became a commercial success.

== Awards and nominations ==
Award	Date of ceremony	Category	Recipient(s)	Result	Ref.
Asian Film Awards	28 October 2020	Best Cinematography	Girish Gangadharan	Nominated	
Asian Film Awards	28 October 2020	Best Original Music	Prashant Pillai	Nominated	
Golden Reel Awards	16 April 2021	Outstanding Achievement in Sound Editing – Foreign Language Feature	Renganaath Ravee, Sreejith Sreenivasan, Boney M. Joy, Arun Rama Varma, Amandeep Singh and Mohammad Iqbal Paratwada	Nominated	
International Film Festival of India	28 November 2019	Best Director	Lijo Jose Pellissery	Won	
Kerala State Film Awards	13 October 2020	Best Director	Lijo Jose Pellissery	Won	
Kerala State Film Awards	13 October 2020	Best Sound Mixing	Kannan Ganapathi	Won	
Asianet Film Awards	1 March 2020	Best Director	Lijo Jose Pellissery	Nominated	
National Film Awards	22 March 2021	Best Cinematography	Gireesh Gangadharan	Won	
Satellite Awards	15 February 2021	Best Foreign Language Film	Jallikattu	Nominated	
South Indian International Movie Awards	18 September 2021	Best Film – Malayalam	Jallikattu	Nominated	
South Indian International Movie Awards	18 September 2021	Best Director – Malayalam	Lijo Jose Pellissery	Won	
South Indian International Movie Awards	18 September 2021	Best Cinematographer – Malayalam	Girish Gangadharan	Nominated	
South Indian International Movie Awards	18 September 2021	Best Actor in a Negative Role– Malayalam	Sabumon Abdusamad	Nominated	

== See also ==
- List of submissions to the 93rd Academy Awards for Best International Feature Film
- List of Indian submissions for the Academy Award for Best International Feature Film
