= Nadanna Sambhavam =

- Theatrical release poster
- Directed by: Vishnu Narayan
- Written by: Rajesh Gopinadhan
- Produced by: Anoop Kannan; Renu A
- Starring: Biju Menon; Suraj Venjaramoodu; Shruti Ramachandran; Lijomol Jose; Sudhi Koppa; Johny Antony; Lalu Alex
- Cinematography: Manesh Madhavan
- Edited by: Saiju Sreedharan; Toby John
- Music by: Ankit Menon
- Production company: Anup Kannan Stories
- Distributed by: Phars Film; Yash Raj Films (UK/Europe)
- Release date: 21 June 2024
- Country: India
- Language: Malayalam

Nadanna Sambhavam is a 2024 Malayalam-language comedy-drama film directed by Vishnu Narayan and written by Rajesh Gopinadhan. The film stars Biju Menon, Suraj Venjaramoodu, Shruti Ramachandran and Lijomol Jose in the lead roles. The film received mixed-to-positive reviews from critics.

== Plot ==
The plot of Nadanna Sambhavam revolves around a Villa community, and the conflict between Unni and Ajith. Unni is a family man who is perceived differently by those around him.

== Cast ==
- Biju Menon as Sreekumaran Unni
- Suraj Venjaramoodu as Ajith Neelakandan
- Shruti Ramachandran as Roshy, Unni's wife
- Lijomol Jose as Dhanya, Ajith's wife
- Sudhi Koppa as Lincoln, Ajith's friend
- Johny Antony as SI Siby
- Lalu Alex as CI Pradeep
- Eithal Evana Sherin as Mythri / Chakki, Unni's daughter
- Jess Sweejan as Ayana, Ajith's daughter
- Sreejith Nair as Mahesh
- Noushad Ali as Vivek
- Athira Harikumar as Priya, Vivek's wife
- Anagha Ashok as Aswathy
- Sanuja Somanath as Jaisy
- Manjula Mohandas as Nessy
- Chithra Prasad as Soumya, Mahesh's wife
- Anju Thomas as Mridula
- Swapna Pillai as Aayisha
- Sreejith Nair as Mahesh
- Madhusoodhanan as ASI Sakariya
- Anju Abhraham as CPO Maya

== Production ==
After bankrolling Oru Mexican Aparatha, Producer, Anoop Kannan and Renu A, decided to bring director Vishnu Narayan of Maradona fame and writer Rajesh Gopinadhan, who has penned films like Kali and Djinn under their banner Anup Kannan Stories, and the film features music by Ankit Menon and cinematography by Manesh Madhavan.

== Release ==
Nadanna Sambhavam was scheduled to release on 22 March, but was postponed to 21 June 2024. The film released on ManoramaMAX from August 9th, 2024 onwards.
