= Girish Gangadharan =

Indian cinematographer

- Born: 8 March 1982 (age 44); Chadayamangalam, Kollam, Kerala, India
- Occupation: Director of Photography
- Years active: 2013–present
- Spouse: Shyna

Girish Gangadharan ISC (born 8 March 1982) is an Indian cinematographer known for his work in Malayalam and Tamil films. He is the recipient of the National Film Award for Best Cinematography for his work in the 2019 film Jallikkattu directed by Lijo Jose Pellissery, which was India's official entry to that year's Oscars. Additionally, he has also worked on the Tamil-language blockbuster Vikram (2022) and what turned out to be a blockbuster at the box-office, Neelavelicham (2023), though his work was highly acclaimed.

== Career ==
Girish completed his cinematography course at the Government Film and Television Institute, Bengaluru, in 2008. Post-graduation, he started assisting Sameer Thahir. His debut as an independent cinematographer was in Sameer Thahir's directorial debut in 2013, Neelakasham Pachakadal Chuvanna Bhoomi. Following his debut, some of his most notable works include Guppy (2016), Angamaly Diaries (2017), Swathanthryam Ardharathriyil (2018), and Jallikattu (2019). He rose to national fame after the 11-minute single-long take in the climax of the Angamaly Diaries. In the same manner, he also captured long takes in Jallikattu also. In 2016, he won the Kerala State Film Award – Special Mention for Guppy. In 2021, he won the National Film Award for Best Cinematography for Jallikattu.

== Filmography ==
Year	Film	Language	Notes
2013	Neelakasham Pachakadal Chuvanna Bhoomi	Malayalam	Debut film
2014	Mariyam Mukku	Malayalam	
2016	Kali	Malayalam	
2016	Guppy	Malayalam	Kerala State Film Award - Special Mention
2017	Angamaly Diaries	Malayalam	
2017	Solo	Malayalam; Tamil	Bilingual film; Debut in Tamil cinema
2017	Hey Jude	Malayalam	
2018	Swathandriam Ardharathriyil	Malayalam	SIIMA Award for Best Cinematographer
2018	Sarkar	Tamil	
2019	Jallikkattu	Malayalam	Nominated – Asian Film Award for Best Cinematographer; Won – National Film Award for Best Cinematography
2021	Cold Case	Malayalam	
2021	Bheemante Vazhi	Malayalam	
2022	Vikram	Tamil	
2023	Djinn	Malayalam	
2023	Neelavelicham	Malayalam	
2025	Kingdom	Telugu	Debut in Telugu cinema
2025	Coolie	Tamil	
2026	Magic †	Telugu	
