= Tinu Pappachan =

Indian film director and writer

- Born: Kottarakara, Kollam, India
- Occupation: Director
- Years active: 2018–present

Tinu Pappachan, is an Indian film director who works in Malayalam cinema industry. He is known for his debut film Swathanthryam Ardharathriyil (2018).

He was born in kottarakara . He has previously assisted Lijo Jose Pellissery and worked with him in numerous films.

== Filmography ==
Year	Title	Writer	Actors	Notes
2018	Swathanthryam Ardharathriyil	Dileep Kurian	Antony Varghese, Vinayakan, Chemban Vinod Jose	
2021	Ajagajantharam	Kichu Tellus, Vineeth Vishwam	Antony Varghese, Arjun Ashokan	
2023	Chaaver	Joy Mathew	Kunchacko Boban, Arjun Ashokan, Antony Varghese	
