= Ajagajantharam =

2021 film directed by Tinu Pappachan

- Theatrical release poster
- Directed by: Tinu Pappachan
- Written by: Kichu Tellus; Vineeth Vishwam
- Produced by: Emmanuel Joseph; Ajith Thalapilly
- Starring: Antony Varghese; Arjun Ashokan
- Cinematography: Jinto George
- Edited by: Shameer Muhammed
- Music by: Justin Varghese
- Production company: Silver Bay Studios
- Distributed by: Central Pictures
- Release date: 23 December 2021
- Running time: 122 minutes
- Country: India
- Language: Malayalam

Ajagajantharam (transl. Difference between a goat and an elephant) is a 2021 Indian Malayalam-language action adventure thriller film directed by Tinu Pappachan and written by Kichu Tellus and Vineeth Vishwam. It stars Antony Varghese, Arjun Ashokan, and Sabumon Abdusamad. The music was composed by Justin Varghese, while the cinematography and editing were handled by Jinto George and Shameer Muhammed.

Ajagajantharam was scheduled to release on 26 February 2021, but was postponed due the second wave of COVID-19 pandemic. The film was later released on 23 December 2021 and emerged as a commercial success at the box office. The film was 2021 year of sixth highest grossing Malayalam film

== Plot ==
Lali and Ambi are mahouts living in the village of Aranjali, where most of the youth and middle-aged villagers consumes alcohol, substances and are egoistic. Lali and Ambi supply an elephant named Neysseri Parthan for the temple festival, where they get a bit uninhibited and carries on themselves with high ego. Kannan, an unemployed youth, and his friends tries to be a bit brash and bumptious with them due to a small disagreement. Lali kicks Kannan for being in his face for long and also thrashes Kannan's friend Vinu. Enraged, Kannan and his friends decide to exact revenge and plans a full scale mayhem in the festival to kill Lali and Ambi. The mayhem ensues and Kannan and his friends attacks Lali and Ambi, but Lali and Ambi fights Kannan and his men with Parthan's help. They finally escape from the festival and return to their home.

== Cast ==
- Antony Varghese as Lali
- Arjun Ashokan as Kannan
- Kichu Tellus as Ambi
- Sabumon Abdusamad as Kachamber Das
- Vineeth Vishwam as Vinu
- Anil Nedumangad as Sony
- Sudhi Koppa as Pindy
- Tito Wilson as Kottappuram Surendran
- Jaffar Idukki as Committee President
- Bitto Davis as Pottachira Hari
- Vijilesh Karayad as Eden
- Lukman Avaran as Thara
- Sinoj Varghese as Joly
- Sree Renjini as Meera
- Chemban Vinod Jose as Aliyan (cameo appearance)
- Nadakkal Unnikrishnan (Elephant) as Neysseri Parthan

== Production ==
Antony Varghese and Tinu Pappachan had earlier collaborated in the latter's debut directorial Swathanthryam Ardharathriyil. The film's title Ajagajantharam was given by Lijo Jose Pellissery, while the story has been written by Kichu Tellus and Vineeth Vishwam. It was produced by Emmanuel Joseph and Ajith Thalapilliy. The soundtrack and background score were composed by Justin Varghese. Jinto George is the cinematographer while Shameer Muhammed and Arjun Kallingal served as the editor and photographer.

== Music ==
=== Track listing ===
Ajagajantharam

Soundtrack album by Justin Varghese
- Released: 21 December 2021
- Recorded: 2020–2021
- Genre: Feature film soundtrack
- Length: 9:24
- Language: Malayalam
- Label: 123Musix
- Producer: Justin Varghese

Justin Varghese chronology
Joji (2021)	Ajagajantharam (2021)	Super Sharanya (2022)
External audio
- Audio Jukebox on YouTube

Ajagajantharam
No.	Title	Lyrics	Singer(s)	Length
1.	"Olluleru (Traditional dance song of Mavila Community)"	Traditional	Praseetha Chalakudy	3:21
2.	"Dannana"	Sudheesh Maruthalam	Mathai Sunil	3:01
3.	"Onnu Randu"	Sudheesh Maruthalam	Sudheesh Maruthalam	3:02
Total length:				9:24

=== Original soundtrack ===
Ajagajantharam

Film score by Justin Varghese
- Released: 17 January 2022
- Genre: Film score
- Length: 45:43
- Label: 123Musix
- Producer: Justin Varghese
External audio
- Audio Jukebox on YouTube

Ajagajantharam (Original Soundtrack)
No.	Title	Length
1.	"The Ajagajantharam-Psy"	2:31
2.	"Lakka Tokka"	3:12
3.	"Kachambar Das"	1:42
4.	"Break Balan"	1:14
5.	"Kannan'S Rage"	1:32
6.	"Slayer'S Siren"	1:27
7.	"Head On"	1:38
8.	"Dawn And Wild Fire"	1:22
9.	"The Bullhook Fight"	1:15
10.	"Kannan Vs Lali"	1:13
11.	"Kachambar Vs Lali"	1:40
12.	"The Tusker's Roar"	1:54
13.	"Cops In The Field"	1:52
14.	"Run Run Run"	1:32
15.	"Wrath of Kannan"	1:08
16.	"Kidnapping Eden"	1:44
17.	"The Lorry Bang"	1:45
18.	"Sony Chettan"	1:09
19.	"Heat Of Blades"	1:22
20.	"Kanakan"	1:24
21.	"Death Trap"	1:13
22.	"The Cop Trap"	1:34
23.	"The War Begins"	1:11
24.	"Raging Tusker Storm"	1:07
25.	"The War"	1:09
26.	"Lali And Parthan-The Killer Duo"	1:25
27.	"The Blast"	1:02
28.	"Lali's Heroic Revival"	2:22
29.	"Trailer Music"	1:52
Total length:		45:43

== Release ==
The film was initially scheduled to be released on 26 February 2021, but was postponed due to COVID-19 pandemic. It was finally released on 23 December 2021, coinciding with Christmas weekend.

=== Home media ===
The satellite and digital rights of the film were sold to SonyLIV and Surya TV.

== Reception ==
Ajagajantharam received positive reviews from critics with praise for its action sequences, acting, cinematography and technical aspects, but criticized its "wafer-thin" story.

=== Critical response ===
Sajin Shrijith of The New Indian Express gave 3.5/5 stars and wrote "Like his mentor Lijo Jose Pellissery, Tinu Pappachan proves once again that he is one of the few filmmakers in Malayalam cinema right now supremely adept at staging chaos." Akshay Krishna of OTTplay gave 3.5/5 stars and wrote "Ajagajantharam is a film that offers impeccable, grounded and realistic action scenes that can be best enjoyed in a theatre."

Anna Mathews of The Times of India gave 2.5/5 stars and wrote "Ajagajantharam seems purely a movie for the sake of stunts and there is hardly the slightest sliver of a story holding together the fight sequences."

S. R. Praveen of The Hindu wrote "The tasteful manner in which some of the action sequences are staged often makes us forget all our million grouses with Tinu Pappachan's film." Tony Mathew of Onmanorama termed it as "a power-packed action feast" and wrote "This is exactly the dose of high voltage fun you needed right now."
