= Sinoj Varghese =

Indian film actor

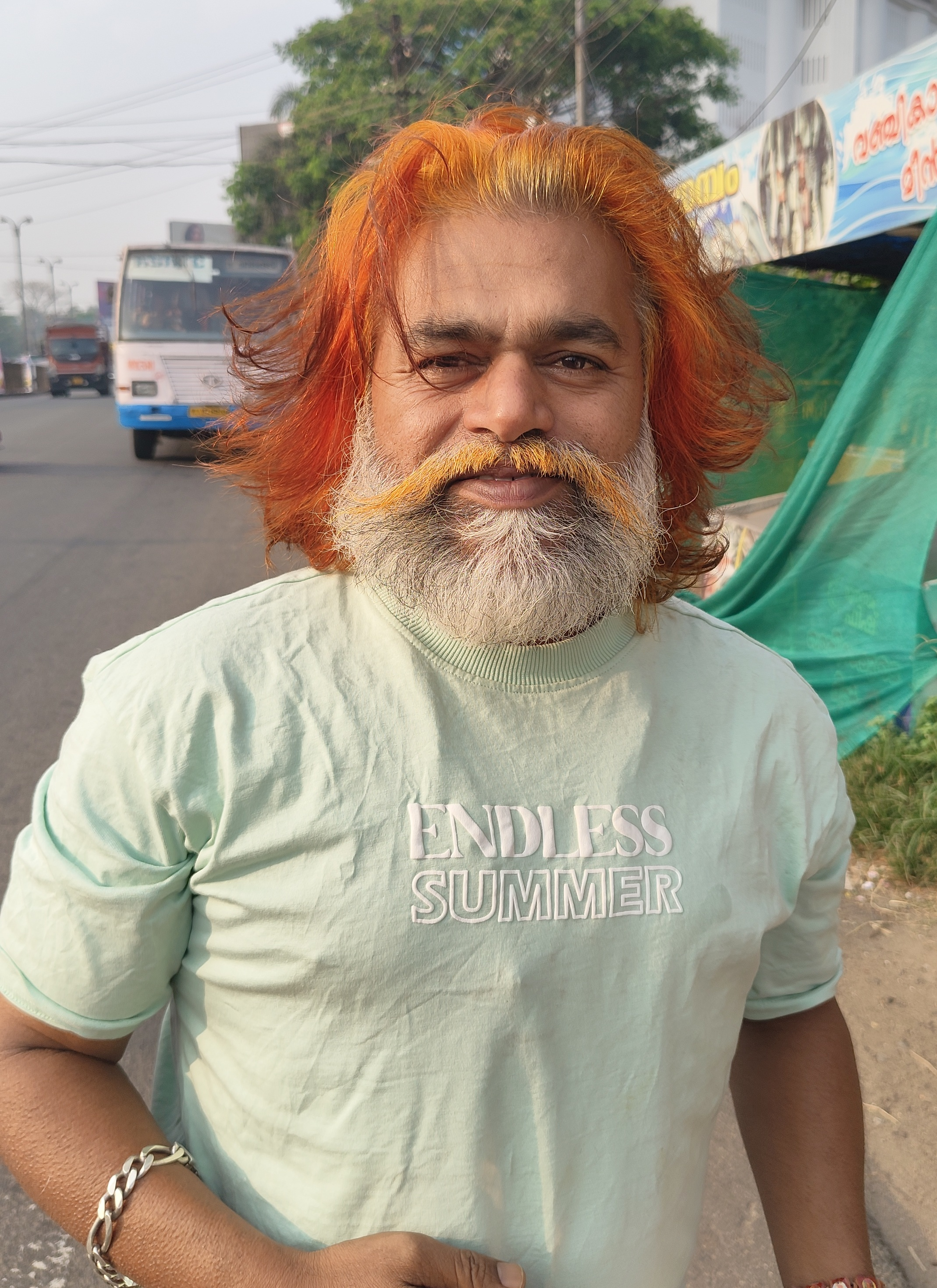
- Occupation: Actor
- Years active: 2017–present
- Notable work: Angamaly Diaries

Sinoj Varghese is an Indian actor who primarily works in the Malayalam films. He made his acting debut in 2017 through the film Angamaly Diaries, directed by Lijo Jose Pellissery.

== Career ==
Sinoj made his acting debut in 2017 with Angamaly Diaries, where he portrayed the character Kunjootti. Following this, he appeared in several action-oriented films directed by Tinu Pappachan, including Swathandriam Ardharathriyil (2018) and Ajagajantharam (2021).

Later, he has appeared in comedies and dramas such as Tsunami (2021), and Corona Dhavan (2023). In 2024, he played roles in films like Kadakan and Gangs of Sukumarakkuruppu.

== Filmography ==
Year	Title	Role	Ref.
2017	Angamaly Diaries	Kunjootti	
2017	Aadu 2	Note Marti	
2018	Swathandriam Ardharathriyil	Devassy	
2018	Kadam Kadha		
2019	Porinju Mariam Jose	Manja	
2019	Ulta	Lambodharan	
2021	Tsunami	Vasu	
2021	Ajagajantharam	Joly	
2022	1744 White Alto	Jacob	
2022	Aanandam Paramanandam	Joy	
2022	Vichithram	Chandi	
2023	Kaipola		
2023	Corona Dhavan	Durbhalan	
2023	Kakkipada	Bomber 1	
2023	Paathirakkaattu		
2024	Kadakan	Kuppi Vasu	
2024	Gangs of Sukumarakkuruppu		
2024	Kuttante Shinigami		
2024	Kummattikali		
2025	Izha	Kochusthaad	
2025	Behindd	Suresh	
2025	Sathyathil Sambhavichathu		
2025	Athma Saho		
2026	Derby		
2026	Disco †	TBA	
