= Shameer Muhammed =

Indian film editor

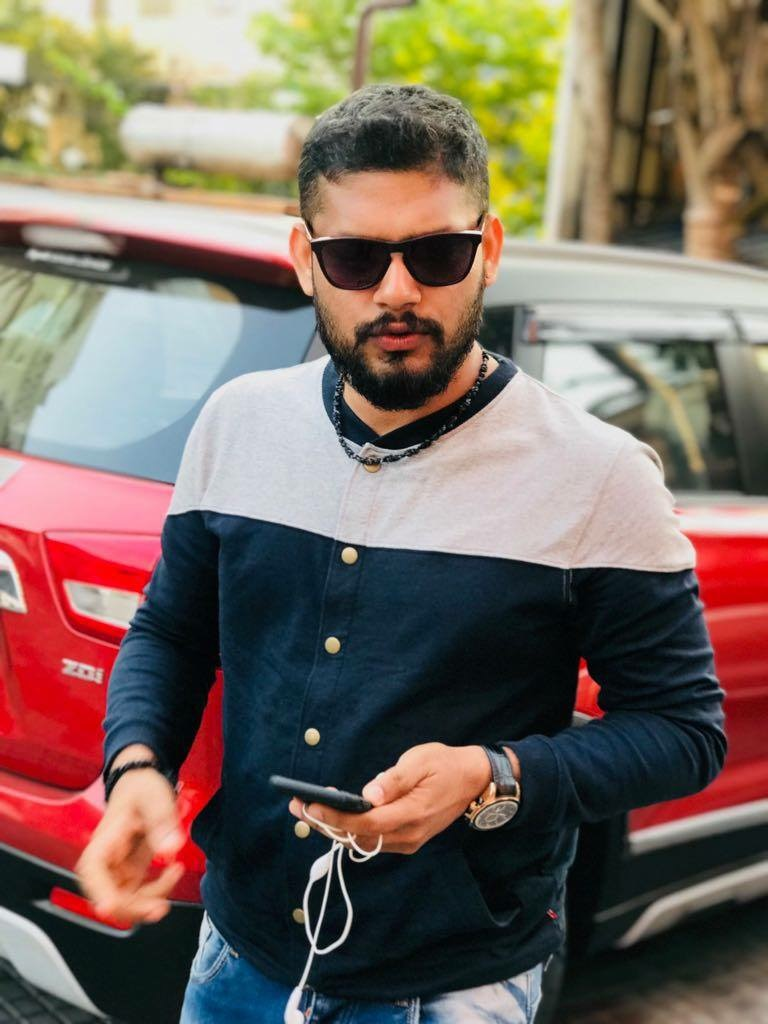
- Muhammed in 2018
- Born: Shameer Mohammed; Thrissur, Kerala, India
- Occupations: Editor; producer
- Years active: 2012–present
- Spouse: Reshma
- Children: 2

Shameer Muhammed is an Indian film editor and producer predominantly working in Malayalam cinema. He was an alumnus of Chethana Media Institute, Thrissur. He worked as a spot editor in several movies and his debut as an independent editor was the 2015 adventure drama film Charlie.

== Career ==
Shameer started his career as an editor for ad films and albums. Then he moved to the Tamil film industry and worked as an assistant editor to the award-winning film editor, late Kishore Te. He has worked as a spot editor for Grandmaster (2012), Jawan of Vellimala (2012), I Love Me (2012), Nee Ko Nja Cha (2013), Kalimannu (2013), Memories (2013), Balyakalasakhi (2014), Salaam Kashmir (2014), and Ennu Ninte Moideen (2015). He had done the editing of the fight sequences of Gabbar is Back (2015), Valiyavan (2015), Sandamarutham (2015), and Singam 3 (2017). He also edited ads of several multinational brands and did more than 15 trailers. He turned independent with Charlie, directed by Martin Prakkat.

== Personal life ==
Muhammed married Reshma and the couple have two children. The family is currently staying along with his mother, Shereefa in Vyttila, Kochi.

== Filmography ==
Key
†	Denotes films that have not yet been released

Year	Title	Notes
2015	Charlie	
2016	Inspector Dawood Ibrahim	
2017	Angamaly Diaries	
2017	Oru Mexican Aparatha	
2017	Thrissivaperoor Kliptham	
2017	Villain	
2018	Swathandriam Ardharathriyil	
2018	Mohanlal	
2018	Uncle	
2018	Aabhaasam	
2018	Oru Kuttanadan Blog	
2018	9	
2018	Iblis	
2018	Chandragiri	
2019	Kodathi Samaksham Balan Vakeel	
2019	Thanneer Mathan Dinangal	Also producer
2019	Pranaya Meenukalude Kadal	
2019	Ulta	
2019	The Gambler	
2019	Marconi Mathai	
2019	Helen	
2020	Forensic	
2020	Varthamanam	
2020	Ajagajantharam	
2021	Irul	Also producer Released on Netflix
2021	The Priest	
2021	Cold Case	Also producer Released on Amazon Prime
2021	Sunny	
2022	Meppadiyan	
2022	Aaraattu	
2022	Pathaam Valavu	
2022	Kaduva	
2022	Vishudha Mejo	Also producer
2022	Eesho	Released on SonyLIV
2022	Monster	
2022	Naalam Mura	
2022	Kaapa	
2022	Vazhakku	
2022	Malikappuram	
2023	Voice of Sathyanathan	
2023	Sambbhavam Nadanna Ratriyil	
2023	Kadakan	
2024	Abraham Ozler	
2024	Turbo	
2024	Once Upon a Time in Kochi	
2024	ARM	
2024	Kadha Innuvare	
2024	Marco	
2025	Rekhachithram	
2025	Game Changer	Debut in Telugu cinema
2025	Narivetta	
2026	Pennu Case	
2026	Kattalan	
2026	Varavu	
2026	Titans †	
