= Vishnu Narayan =

Indian film director, producer and distributor

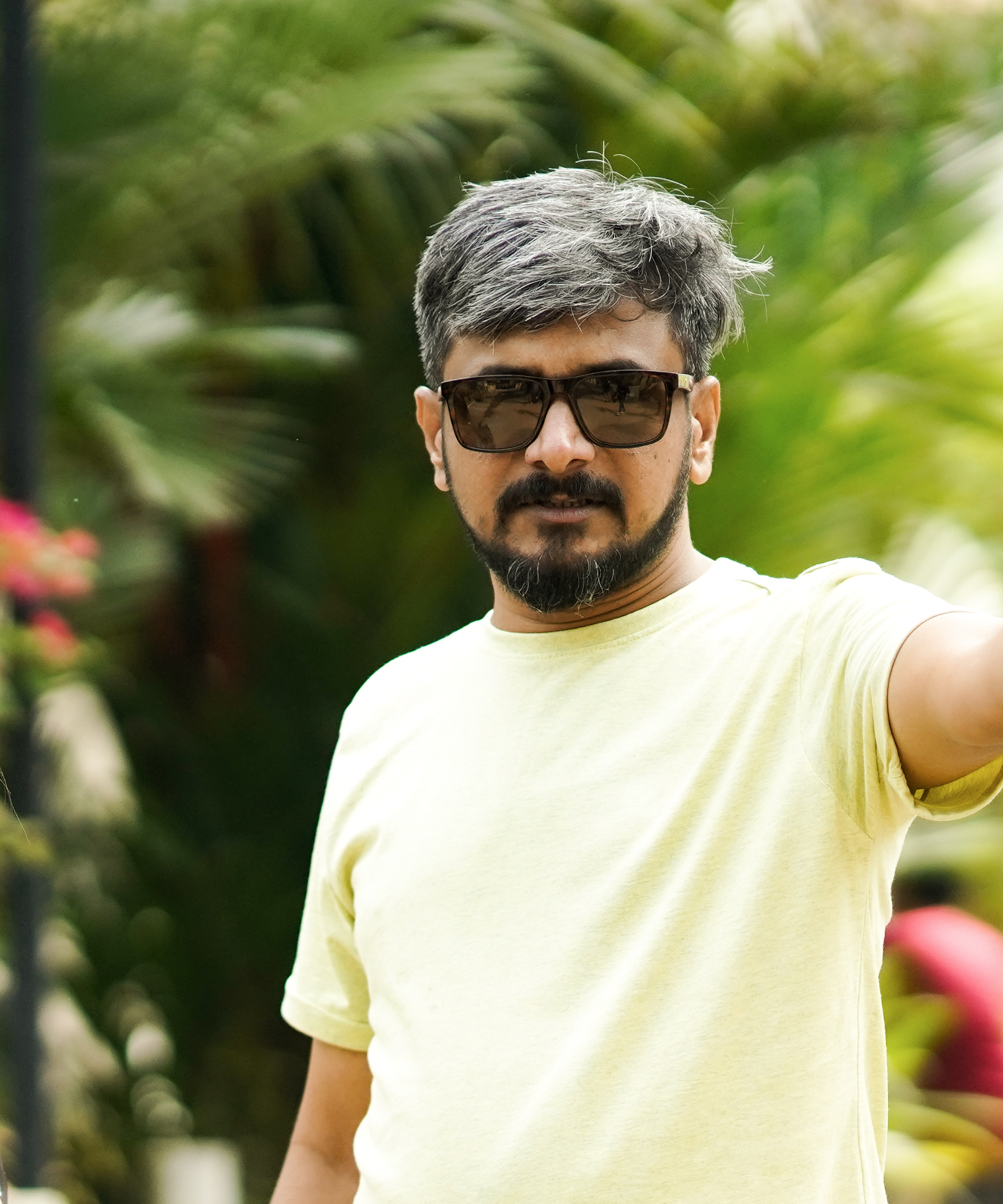
- Born: Vishnu Narayan; Kottarakkara, Kerala, India
- Occupations: Film director; producer
- Years active: 2010–present
- Spouse: Nisha C

Vishnu Narayan is an Indian film director who mainly works in Malayalam cinema.

== Early life ==
Vishnu Narayan born 26 April 1982 at Kottarakkara, Kerala, India.He made his directorial debut with the 2018 romantic action thriller film Maradona (2018 film), starring Tovino Thomas .

== Career ==
Vishnu began his career as an assistant director to the 2007 film Oliver Twist . after his 3 films as assistant director, he joined with ashiq abu. He served as an assistant director in five Aashiq Abu films.he associated with Sameer Thahir for one film. After Maheshinte Prathikaaram, he debut with his first film named ‘’Maradona (2018 film)’’ a romantic action thriller which is critically acclaimed and a commercial success in box office. His second film’’ Nadanna Sambhavam’’ starring Biju Menon and Suraj Venjaramoodu was released in June 2024.

== Filmography ==
| Year | Film |
|---|---|
| 2018 | Maradona |
| 2024 | Nadanna Sambhavam |
