= Angamaly Diaries =

- Theatrical release poster
- Directed by: Lijo Jose Pellissery
- Written by: Chemban Vinod Jose
- Produced by: Vijay Babu
- Starring: Antony Varghese; Anna Rajan; Tito Wilson; Appani Sarath
- Cinematography: Girish Gangadharan
- Edited by: Shameer Muhammed
- Music by: Prashant Pillai
- Production company: Friday Film House
- Distributed by: Friday Tickets; Tricolor Entertainment
- Release date: 3 March 2017
- Running time: 130 minutes
- Country: India
- Language: Malayalam
- Box office: est. ₹20 crore

Angamaly Diaries is a 2017 Indian Malayalam-language action crime drama film directed by Lijo Jose Pellissery and written by Chemban Vinod Jose. The film features 86 debutant actors with Antony Varghese, Anna Rajan, Appani Sarath, Kichu Tellus, Vineeth Vishwam, Bitto Davis, Ullas Chemban, Tito Wilson and Sinoj Varghese playing the main roles. The film features an uncut 11-minute long take in the climax featuring around 1,000 artists.

Angamaly Diaries was released on 3 March 2017 to critical acclaim and emerged as a commercial success at the box office. The film was included in The Hindu's top 25 Malayalam films of the decade. Antony Varghese won the Youth Icon Award at Asianet Film Awards.

It was remade in Telugu as Falaknuma Das (2019) starring Vishwak Sen in the lead role.

== Plot ==
2001: Vincent Pepe is a resident in Angamaly, a medium-sized suburb of Kochi near the airport. In the middle school, Pepe and his friends put together an unofficial "team", a kind-of-pretend gang. They hero-worshipped the leading team of their area at that time, which was led by Babuji and his lieutenant Thomas. They are used to exercising with them and listen to their advice on fighting and strategy. As young men, Pepe and his friends get into their first fight with outsiders, who were bothering the neighbourhood girls.

2008: Pepe starts his first romance with a local girl named Seema, whom he has known since school days. However, the innocent phase ends with Babuji getting killed by two local boys, Ravi and Rajan, who are sent to prison for the murder.

2013: Pepe still has the same friends and Babuji's friend Thomas has become a member of their team in an advisory capacity. Pepe is seriously dating a nursing student from Germany and looking for a way to build a business that can support himself and his friends. They start a pork business by purchasing pigs wholesale from Ravi and Rajan, who have become the leading merchants in the neighbourhood after their release from prison. Later, Pepe and his friends start their own pig farm and set up a wholesale business rivalling Ravi and Rajan.

During a discussion between the two groups, Pepe and his friends and Ravi and Rajan's young followers led by Ravi's brother-in-law get into a fight, where Pepe accidentally kills one of them. To resolve the court case, Pepe's team has to turn to increasingly illegal activities to raise money to pay off Ravi and Rajan and their friends. They open an illegal poker hall and manage to raise funds. With the case hanging over him, Pepe feels obligated to end his relationship with the nursing student.

At this point, Lily "Lichi" David, who is Pepe's friend's older sister, returns to the area, where she starts spending more time with Pepe despite the court case hanging over him. The court case is settled, but Pepe is still in danger because the person he accidentally killed has cousins who have come to Angamaly to avenge his death. Ravi and Rajan act as go-betweens and try to keep the situation calm, but Pepe eventually needs to leave town. While Pepe is waiting for his Dubai visa to come through and celebrating a festival, they give the final payoff to Ravi and Rajan who pass on a portion to the cousins of the victim. However, the cousins are still angry and plan to attack Pepe after they have received all the money they can.

2014: During the evening festival celebrations, Ravi's brother-in-law stabs Ravi and Thomas, and attacks Rajan as they learn that they received only 0.4 million out of 3 million Pepe paid them after an utterance by a drunk Thomas. During the fight, Ravi's brother-in-law is chased into the fireworks display and everyone watches in stunned silence as his body is charred by thousands of fireworks.

2016: Pepe marries Lichi and is a construction worker in Dubai, from where he still calls home regularly and also misses his life in Angamaly.

== Cast ==
- Antony Varghese as Vincent Pepe
- Tito Wilson as Rajan aka 'U-Clamp Rajan'
- Appani Sarath as Ravi aka 'Appani Ravi'
- Anna Rajan as Lily "Lichi" David
- Kichu Tellus as Varkey
- Vineeth Vishwam as Bheeman
- Bitto Davis as '10ml' Thomas
- Sinoj Varghese as Kunjootti
- Sreekanth Dasan as Paripp Marti
- Anandhu as Kanakuna Marti
- Binoy Antony as Vedimara Abu
- Anson Antony as Babuji
- Merin Jose Pottackal as Maramkothi Sijo
- Binny Rinky Benjamin as Sakhi
- Sruthy Jayan as Alice
- Amrutha Anna Reji as Seema
- Jolly Chirayath as Pepe's mother
- Athira Patel as Mercy
- Ullas Chemban as SI Shahul Hameed
- Sreeja Das as Appani Ravi's wife
- Sarath Chandran as Molester
- Benny Varghese as Advocate
- Akash Dev as Koluth Jaison
- Milton Raju
- Vineeth Thattil David as Kadan Benny Snake eater
- Chemban Vinod Jose as himself (in a guest appearance)
- Lijo Jose Pellissery as a man buying pork (uncredited)

== Production ==
The film introduces 86 new actors and the audition was held at different parts of Kerala, especially at Kochi. Actor Chemban Vinod Jose wrote the screenplay. The filming started on 11 October 2016 in Kochi. Angamaly Diaries is Vijay Babu's first sole production after the spat with his business partner Sandra Thomas.

== Soundtrack ==
Angamaly Diaries

Soundtrack album by Prashant Pillai
- Released: March 24, 2017
- Genre: Feature film soundtrack
- Length: 19:48
- Label: Muzik247
- Producer: Prashant Pillai

Prashant Pillai chronology
Anuraga Karikkin Vellam (2016)	Angamaly Diaries (2017)	Sakhavu (2017)

The film's music was composed by Prashant Pillai, with lyrics by P. S. Rafeeque and Preeti Pillai. The full movie soundtrack was released on 23 February 2017 and consists of 9 songs: six original and three alternate versions.

Angamaly Diaries
No.	Title	Lyrics	Singer(s)	Length
1.	"Angamaly"	Traditional	Angamaly Pranchi (Chorus : Febin Paulose, Joy Chirakal)	2:33
2.	"Ayalathe"	P. S. Rafeeque	Shreekumar Vakkiyil	2:10
3.	"Theeyame"	Traditional	Angamaly Pranchi, Shreekumar Vakkiyil	3:00
4.	"Thana Dhina"	Traditional	Angamaly Pranchi (Chorus : Febin Paulose, Joy Chirakal)	3:51
5.	"Do Naina (Trailer Version)"	Prashant Pillai	Shreekumar Vakkiyil	1:16
6.	"Do Naina (Male Version)"	Preeti Pillai	Shreekumar Vakkiyil	1:16
7.	"Do Naina (Female Version)"	Preeti Pillai	Preeti Pillai	1:16
8.	"La Vettam (Male Version)"	P. S. Rafeeque	Shreekumar Vakkiyil	1:16
9.	"La Vettam (Female Version)"	P. S. Rafeeque	Preeti Pillai	1:16
10.	"Chayakadakkara"	P. S. Rafeeque	Angamaly Pranchi, Chorus	1:16

== Release ==
=== Theatrical ===
The film was released theatrically on 3 March 2017.

=== Box office ===
The film collected over ₹20 crore (US$2.1 million) in its final run in theatres.

=== Critical reception ===
Angamaly Diaries received positive reviews from critics who praised its realistic making, cinematography, performances and action sequences.

Deborah Young of The Hollywood Reporter termed the film as a "rambunctious breakout" and praised the climax describing it as "dazzling, can't-look-away finale, shot in a single 12-minute take that throws in everything plus the kitchen sink and brings the story to a shrill conclusion". Anjana George of The Times of India gave 4 out of 5 stars and praised the film as "Showcasing a mélange of beautiful visuals, thumping music and natural performances, Angamaly Diaries is one of the more fresh and terrific attempts made by a filmmaker of late in Mollywood Film." She added, "Chemban has weaved in the dialect, food, music and culture of the people in Angamaly to the plot, paying careful attention to every intricate detail, while making it an engaging movie."

Anna M. M. Vetticad of Firstpost gave 4 out of 5 stars and called it as a "delightful, unexpectedly hilarious take on the squalid underbelly of Kerala's Angamaly town.". She added, "If ever there was an example of the committed cinephile's dictum “it is not the story but the treatment that makes a film”, you have it here. Because if you think about it, Angamaly Diaries – funny and insightful in equal measure – does not have a story in the conventional sense, yet that, among so many other reasons, is what makes it brilliant." Veeyen termed the film as "Excellent" and stated that "the Angamaly that filmmaker Lijo Jose Pellissery and writer Vinod Jose scribble their diary notes on is a dusty, deafening town that smells of pork and sloshed human blood. The ceaseless squabbles for honour, money and might render it a land with almost dystopian proportions, where a terrifyingly realistic tale of subsistence unfurls."

Baradwaj Rangan of Film Companion South wrote "Like last year's Kannada blockbuster Kirik Party, Angamaly Diaries is proof that these relatively under-the-radar upstart films are making far better use of mainstream tropes – fights, songs, comedy – than your average mega-budget big-star vehicle...like Premam, Angamaly Diaries places a certain kind of small-town, short-fused masculinity under a microscope. Men are defined by their actions – and I'm not just talking about the action sequences."

== Impact ==
The film also received high praise from the film fraternity. Mohanlal wrote "Happened to watch Angamaly Diaries and I'm impressed by the way the movie is made. Brilliant acting by every one and Kudos to the whole team and to Chemban Vinod Jose and Lijo Jose Pellissery". Prithviraj Sukumaran lauded it as a "stunning piece of film making" and praised its "original writing". Nivin Pauly applauded the casting, performances, story calling them "so refreshing and real". Karthik Subbaraj called the film "Super Fantastic" and lauded it, saying "Writing, Performances & Filmmaking Crafts at its best". Anurag Kashyap called it "an extraordinary film" and tagged Angamaly Diaries as his film of the year so far.

List of Film Festivals
Year	Film Festival Name	Location	Prize Won
2018	Indie Meme Film Festival	Austin, TX, USA	

== Accolades ==
Award (Note: Awards, festivals and organisations are in alphabetical order.)	Date of ceremony (Note: Date is linked to the article about the awards held that year, wherever possible.)	Category	Recipient(s)	Result	Ref.
Asianet Film Awards	20 May 2018	Best New Face of the Year – Male	Sarath	Won	
Asianet Film Awards	20 May 2018	Youth Icon of the Year	Antony Varghese	Won	
CPC Cine Awards	18 February 2018	Best Director	Lijo Jose Pellissery	Won	
CPC Cine Awards	18 February 2018	Best Cinematographer	Girish Gangadharan (Note: Shared with Rajeev Ravi for Thondimuthalum Driksakshiyum)	Won	
Filmfare Awards South	16 June 2018	Best Film – Malayalam	Angamaly Diaries – Friday Film House	Nominated	
Filmfare Awards South	16 June 2018	Best Director – Malayalam	Lijo Jose Pellissery	Nominated	
Filmfare Awards South	16 June 2018	Best Male Debut – Malayalam	Antony Varghese	Won	
Filmfare Awards South	16 June 2018	Best Supporting Actor – Malayalam	Sarath	Nominated	
Filmfare Awards South	16 June 2018	Best Supporting Actress – Malayalam	Anna Rajan	Nominated	
Filmfare Awards South	16 June 2018	Best Music Director – Malayalam	Prashant Pillai	Nominated	
Filmfare Awards South	16 June 2018	Best Male Playback Singer – Malayalam	Shreekumar Vakkiyil – (for "Ayalathe penninte")	Nominated	
South Indian International Movie Awards	14–15 September 2018	Best Film – Malayalam	Angamaly Diaries – Friday Film House	Nominated	
South Indian International Movie Awards	14–15 September 2018	Best Director – Malayalam	Lijo Jose Pellissery	Won	
South Indian International Movie Awards	14–15 September 2018	Best Male Debut – Malayalam	Antony Varghese	Won	
South Indian International Movie Awards	14–15 September 2018	Best Male Debut – Malayalam	Sarath	Nominated	
South Indian International Movie Awards	14–15 September 2018	Best Actor in a Negative Role – Malayalam	Sarath	Won	
South Indian International Movie Awards	14–15 September 2018	Best Female Debut – Malayalam	Anna Rajan	Nominated	
South Indian International Movie Awards	14–15 September 2018	Best Music Director – Malayalam	Prashant Pillai	Nominated	
