= Anoop Kannan =

Indian film director, producer and distributor

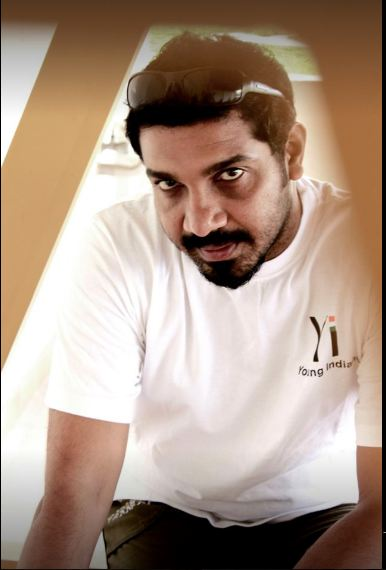
- Born: Anoop Kannan; Muvattupuzha, Kerala, India
- Occupations: Film director; producer
- Years active: 2002–present
- Spouse: Renu
- Parents: Kesavan Nair; Vatsala Kumari

Anoop Kannan is an Indian film director, producer and distributor who mainly works in Malayalam cinema.

== Early life ==
Kannan was born in Moovattupuzha, Ernakulam, as the elder son of Kesavan Nair and Vatsala Kumari. He has a brother, Ajeesh.

== Career ==
Kannan started his career as an assistant director with Lal Jose in the 2002 blockbuster Meesa Madhavan. Later, he worked with Lal Jose in more than 10 movies as an associate director. He has also worked with acclaimed filmmaker Ranjith in the movie Kaiyoppu which starred Mammootty in the lead role. In 2012, Kannan made his directorial debut in Jawan of Vellimala, which is the debut film of Mammootty as a producer. In 2014, he directed Homely Meals. The screenplay of the film was written by Vipin Atlee, and the writer himself played the lead role in this project. Upon its release, Homely Meals received positive reviews and it emerged as a sleeper hit at the theaters. Kannan made his debut as a producer and distributor through his production banner Anoop Kannan Stories. One particular film that he produced, Oru Mexican Aparatha, was a surprise hit at the Mollywood box-office.

== Filmography ==
Year	Film	Credited as				
Year	Film	Director	Producer	Screenwriter	Story	Actor
2024	Nadanna Sambhavam		Yes			
2017	Oru Mexican Aparatha		Yes			
2014	Homely Meals	Yes				
2012	Jawan Of Vellimala	Yes				
