= Pongala (film) =

- Theatrical release poster
- Directed by: A B Binil
- Screenplay by: A B Binil
- Produced by: Deepu Bose; Anil Pillai
- Starring: Sreenath Bhasi
- Cinematography: Jackson
- Edited by: Ajas Pukkadan
- Music by: Ranjin Raj
- Production company: Global Pictures Entertainments
- Release date: 5 December 2025
- Running time: 138 minutes
- Country: India
- Language: Malayalam

Pongala is a 2025 Indian Malayalam language action revenge film, written and directed by A B Binil. The film stars Sreenath Bhasi in lead role and the film was released on 5 December 2025.

== Summary ==
Pongala is the story of clashes that happens among the people of Vypin harbour, inspired by real incidents happened from the early 2000s in the Vypin-Munambam coastal belt near Kochi.

== Cast ==
- Sreenath Bhasi
- Baburaj
- Kichu Tellus
- Sampath Ram
- Sadiq
- Alencier Ley Lopez
- Sudheer Karamana
- Sohan Seenulal
- Indrajith Jagajith
- Surya Krish
- Yami Sona

== Production ==
=== Announcement ===
The film was announced, with the title poster on 19 July 2024.

=== Filming ===
The film was shot at different locations of Kochi.

=== Marketing ===
The teaser of the film was released on 22 August 2025 and the first song was released on 4 December 2025.

== Censor ==
The censor board asked the makers to remove some scenes from the film.

== Release ==
The film was released on 5 December 2025.

=== Streaming rights ===
The streaming rights of this movie were acquired by Amazon Prime Video on 12 June 2026. And also released on Lionsgate Play on 7 August 2026.
