= Justin Varghese =

Indian Music Composer

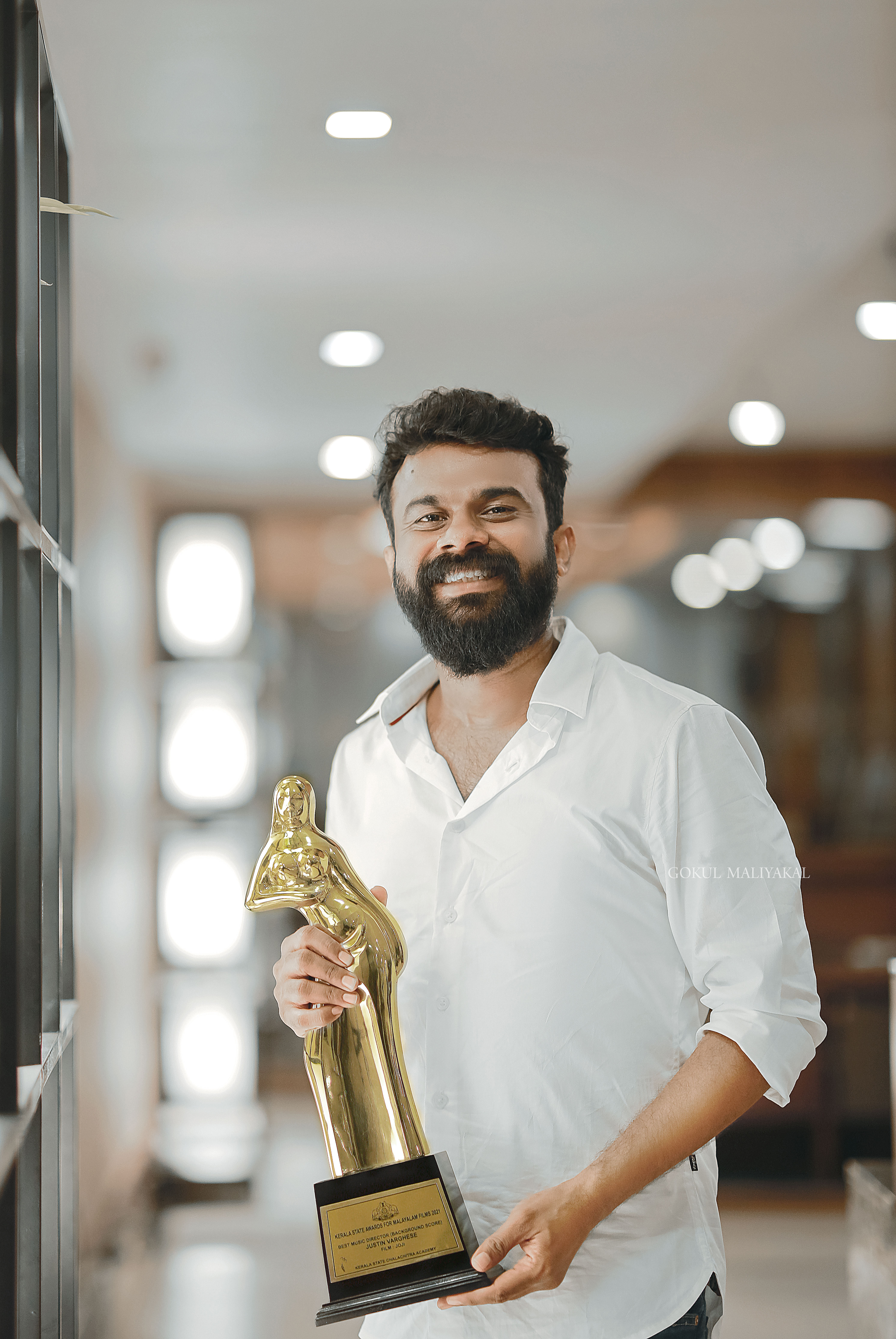
- Varghese holding the Kerala State Award for Best Music Director (2021)

Background information
- Born: 10 October 1983 (age 42); Kochi, Kerala, India
- Occupations: Music Composer; Music Producer; Music Programmer
- Years active: 2009–present
- Spouse: Meera
- Musical career
- Genres: Filmi; Film score; World music; Orchestral music
- Instrument: Keyboard
- Labels: 123Musix; Bhavana Studios; Saregama; Muzik 247

Justin Varghese (born 10 October 1983) is an Indian music composer, music producer, and sound engineer who works predominantly in the Malayalam cinema industry. He is known for his works in Thanneer Mathan Dinangal (2019), Joji (2021) and Ajagajantharam (2021).

== Early life and education ==
Justin got into music by playing the keyboard in his church choir.

== Musical career ==
He started working in Malayalam cinema as an independent music director with Njandukalude Nattil Oridavela (2017).

== Discography ==
Key
†	Denotes films that have not yet been released

Year	Title	Language	Songs	Score	Director
2017	Njandukalude Nattil Oridavela	Malayalam	Yes	Yes	Althaf Salim
2019	Thottappan	Malayalam	No	Yes	Shanavas K Bavakutty
2019	Thanneer Mathan Dinangal	Malayalam	Yes	Yes	Girish A.D
2021	Joji	Malayalam	Yes	Yes	Dileesh Pothan
2022	Dear Friend	Malayalam	Yes	Yes	Vineeth Kumar
2022	Super Sharanya	Malayalam	Yes	Yes	Girish A.D
2022	Meow	Malayalam	Yes	Yes	Lal Jose
2022	Ajagajantharam	Malayalam	Yes	Yes	Tinu Pappachan
2022	Oru Thekkan Thallu Case	Malayalam	Yes	Yes	Sreejith N
2022	Palthu Janwar	Malayalam	Yes	Yes	Sangeeth P Rajan
2022	Visudha Mejo	Malayalam	Yes	Yes	Kiran Thomas
2023	Christopher	Malayalam	Yes	Yes	B. Unnikrishnan
2023	Chaaver	Malayalam	Yes	Yes	Tinu Pappachan
2024	Munjya	Hindi	No	Yes	Aditya Sarpotdar
2024	Stree 2	Hindi	No	Yes	Amar Kaushik
2025	Sky Force	Hindi	No	Yes	Sandeep Kewlani; Abhishek Anil Kapur
2025	Ponman	Malayalam	Yes	Yes	Jotish Shankar
2025	Daveed	Malayalam	Yes	Yes	Govind Vishnu
2025	Painkili	Malayalam	Yes	Yes	Sreejith Babu
2025	Odum Kuthira Chaadum Kuthira	Malayalam	Yes	Yes	Althaf Salim
2026	Prathichaya	Malayalam	Yes	Yes	B. Unnikrishnan
TBA	Mahaavatar †	Hindi	Yes	Yes	Amar Kaushik

== Awards ==
Year	Award	Category	Film/Album/Song	Ref.
2021	Kerala State Film Award	Best Background Score	Joji	
2023	Kerala State Film Award	Best Music Director	Chaaver	
