= Disco (2026 film) =

2026 Indian film

- Theatrical release poster
- Directed by: Ullas Chemban
- Written by: Chemban Vinod Jose
- Produced by: Chemban Vinod Jose
- Starring: Antony Varghese; Arjun Ashokan; Lukman Avaran; Chemban Vinod Jose; Sagar Surya; Shebin Benson; Vishnu Unnikrishnan
- Cinematography: Armo
- Edited by: Rohit VS Wariyath
- Music by: Manikandan Ayyappa
- Production companies: Chembosky Motion Pictures; Fars films
- Release date: 6 November 2026
- Country: India
- Language: Malayalam

Disco is an Indian Malayalam action-crime thriller movie directed by Ullas Chemban and starring Antony Varghese, Arjun Ashokan, Lukman Avaran and Chemban Vinod Jose. It was released in theatres on 6 November 2026 to negative reviews from critics and audiences alike.

== Plot ==
Vidyarmo, the leader of a small-town gang, is released from prison and plans a major robbery based on information he acquired while incarcerated. He teams up with his nephew Ousep and former rival gang leader Darly Marty to steal a share of the proceeds from a gold biscuit heist. However, they faces revenge from a ruthless gang led by Yoyaki.

The film is set in a coastal village. The first half progresses by showing the relationships and clashes between the local gangsters in the village. There are scenes of bloody violence in the second half.

== Cast ==
- Antony Varghese as Yoyaki
- Arjun Ashokan as Chiyar Ashokan
- Lukman Avaran as Darling Marty
- Dev Mohan as Ousu
- Chemban Vinod Jose as Vediamo
- Shebin Benson
- Vishnu Unnikrishnan as Bixon
- Femina George as Manna
- Meera Vasudevan as Cicily
- Appani Sharath as Sharath
- Manikandan Achari as Sathyan, Asokhan henchman
- Gayathri Suresh as Puma
- Padmaraj Ratheesh as Malik
- Senthil Krishna as Ashokan henchman
- Sagar Surya as Yoyaki brother
- Sinoj Varghese
- Vineeth Thattil David as Jawan
- Manu as Tony
- Kalyani Anil

== Development ==
The film Disco, directed by Ullas Chemban, has been scripted by his brother, actor and writer Chemban Vinod Jose. The film is produced by Chembosky Motion Pictures owned by Chemban Vinod and Fars Films. Cinematography is done by Armo, Music by Manikandan Ayyappa, and the editor is Rohit VS Wariyath.

== Music ==
The first song from the film Disco was released in 17 October 2026. The song, which begins with 'Itinno Adame...', composed by Manikandan Ayyappa is written by Suhail Koya and Lema.

== Release ==
The film was released on 6 November 2026.

== Reception ==
Anandhu Suresh of The Indian Express gives the film a rating of one and a half out of five, saying that although it tries to deliver a film full of intense action scenes, it turns into a boring, patience-testing experience due to the weak script and direction. S R Praveen of The Hindu writes that while the film is strong in the technical department, its shortcomings, including a weak screenplay, hold it back. Anna Mathew of The Times of India, giving it a rating of one out of five, writes that the technical aspects of the film, including cinematography, stunt choreography and editing, are strong, but due to weak screenplay, excessive violence, outdated styling and clichéd characters it fail to make a strong impact.

Despite having a viral song, a host of notable Malayalam stars, and a stylish presentation, Disco tests the audience's patience due to its lack of a substantial story and its excessive, brutal violence, writes Dhanya K. Vilayil for the Malayalam edition of The Indian Express. Criticising the misogyny in the film, she writes that the movie objectifies female characters and attempts to derive humour and entertainment through double-meaning dialogues.

Seena Antony writes for ManoramaOnline that this is a film that those who enjoy violent gangster movies can watch and relish. Vivek Santosh of Cinema Express described it a tiring film due to its incoherent screenplay, lifeless characters, excessive runtime and gratuitous violence.
