= Kichu Tellus =

Indian actor and writer

- Citizenship: Indian
- Occupations: Actor; Writer
- Years active: 2017—present
- Spouse: Roshna Ann (married 2020, div. 2025)

Kichu Tellus is an Indian actor and writer, who primarily works in Malayalam film industry. He is known for his role in Ajagajantharam, Daveed and Angamaly Diaries.

== Personal life ==
Tellus is married to Roshna Ann on November, 2020 at St. Ann’s Church in Aluva. They divorced after 5 years.

== Filmography ==
Year	Title	Role	Notes	Ref.
2017	Angamaly Diaries	Pork Varkey	Debut film	
2017	Varnyathil Aashanka	Parthan		
2018	Swathanthryam Ardharathriyil	Charlie		
2018	Maradona	Anto		
2018	Contessa	SI Shahid Moopan		
2019	Vaarikkuzhiyile Kolapathakam	Arangath Benny		
2019	Thanneer Mathan Dinangal	Antony		
2019	Sullu	Babu		
2021	Aalkoottathil Oruvan	Poruthan		
2021	Kaaval	SI Madhu		
2021	Ajagajantharam	Ambi	Also writer	
2021	Kunjeldho			
2022	Koshichaayante Paramb			
2022	Chathuram	SI		
2023	Iratta	Chandran Pillai		
2024	Kuruvipappa			
2024	Aaro			
2024	Thayyal Machine	Shiva		
2024	Pattaakkal	Carlos		
2024	Idiyan Chandhu	Irambu Vaasu		
2025	Daveed	Tytus		
2025	Pongala			
2026	Spa			
