= Cold Case (film) =

2021 Indian film by Tanu Balak

- Release poster
- Directed by: Tanu Balak
- Written by: Sreenath V. Nath
- Produced by: Anto Joseph; Jomon T. John; Shameer Muhammed
- Starring: Prithviraj Sukumaran; Aditi Balan
- Cinematography: Gireesh Gangadharan; Jomon T. John
- Edited by: Shameer Muhammed
- Music by: Prakash Alex
- Production companies: Anto Joseph Film Company; Plan J Studios; AP International
- Distributed by: Amazon Prime Video
- Release date: 30 June 2021
- Running time: 140 minutes
- Country: India
- Language: Malayalam

Cold Case is a 2021 Indian Malayalam-language supernatural horror crime-thriller film directed by Tanu Balak (in his directorial debut) and written by Sreenath V. Nath. The film stars Prithviraj Sukumaran and Aditi Balan in the lead roles with Pooja Mohanraj, Anil Nedumangad, Lakshmi Priyaa Chandramouli, Anand, and Rajesh Hebbar in supporting roles. The plot follows two parallel investigations of a paranormal murder case by IPS officer M. Sathyajith (Prithviraj) and investigative journalist Medha Padmaja (Aditi), who eventually cross paths.

Following a formal announcement in September 2020, principal photography began in October 2020 and concluded in December 2020. It was filmed mostly in Trivandrum, with filming lasting 36 days. The film score was composed by Prakash Alex while Gireesh Gangadharan and Jomon T. John jointly handled the cinematography

.Cold Case was released on 30 June 2021 through the streaming platform Amazon Prime Video to mixed reviews from critics, bypassing a theatrical release due to the COVID-19 pandemic.

== Plot ==
The film opens with a Hindu exorcism ritual in Varanasi and a Muslim exorcism ritual in Kerala.

Medha, a journalist leaves her news office while talking to her mother-in-law who is at an ashram. While driving home, ACP M. Sathyajith is called in to investigate a murder, as a result of a skull being found in a bag from a river. Forensic analysis reveals that the murder was committed over a year ago and the skull belongs to a female aged 25–30 years. The identity of the deceased is then sought. The dental implants on the skull, indicate that the victim was a female named Eva Maria, who was from a wealthy family and that her father had left her a fortune before his death. The police investigate her location and traces her family. Her stepmother tells him that she had married a Hindu and remained estranged from them for a while and that during the Easter of 2019, her father met her and possibly patched up things between them. The police also learn that all the land that Eva had inherited was quietly sold to an outsider.

On the other hand, Eva's spirit tries to contact Medha, a journalist currently seeking help for her daughter's custody case from Advocate Haritha, who is also a friend of Medha, as Eva's spirit needs Medha's help. After Eva tries to signal Medha via paranormal occurrences in her house, Medha takes the help of an occult researcher, Zara Zacchai, who tells her the name of the soul as Eva Maria and Medha with the help of Advocate Haritha (who was Eva's lawyer for her divorce case) and Asif, a colleague starts her own investigation in parallel, unaware that the Police are investigating the case.

Sathyajith later meets Eva's ex-husband and finds out that he was deep in debt because of his divorce proceeding as he had to return 25 million that he had earlier borrowed from Eva to start his own production house. This debt was settled by his now father-in-law who is the owner of the media house where Medha works. Sathyajith traces Eva's last known location to a working women's hostel and through multiple witnesses concludes that she was last seen in September 2019 which is the period of her death. However, her phone was active till April 2020 and her Facebook account showed pictures posted in Varanasi till April 2020. He then traces a list of tourists who due to the lockdown were brought to the home state by a special government bus service. He finds Eva's name in that list and concludes that an imposter was posting pictures and sending messages to her friends so that no one reports her missing. Meanwhile, the dental advisor who helped them with the dental implants on the skull, tells him that sometime back they had recovered a human hand in Tamil Nadu and this possibly could link to this case. On analysis, it is found that the hand belonged to Eva and had strands of hair that might belong to the murderer.

During the investigation Sathyajith learns that Medha is also in search of the truth. While they are discussing each other's findings, Sathyajith gets a phone call from his uncle who had seen the impersonator for Eva while returning from Varanasi. All the pieces of the puzzle fit into the place and Sathyajith detects that the killer is none other than Advocate Haritha. Haritha was neck-deep in debt when she was handling Eva's case. Her father died when a real estate project was mid-way in construction and she fears if the project is not delivered within a month's period she may be arrested. One day she takes Eva home on the pretext of talking her out of her grief and strangles her to death. Haritha then dismembers Eva's body, stores it in the fridge, and later scatters the pieces. She then creates fake documents assuming Eva's identity and sells off Eva's inheritance and restores her father's business, She takes Eva's phone to Varanasi and posts the pictures on Facebook, after which she throws Eva's phone into the river. She later boards a special government bus service for the trip back to Kerala.

Now alerted Haritha goes to Medha's home to clean up the evidence. While she was there alone, she sees the same refrigerator that she had used to store Eva's remains and then, Haritha is killed when the refrigerator explodes. In the final scenes, we see Medha saying she was right about her beliefs that the refrigerator was possessed with Eva's soul. Sathyajith tells her that there would always be a conflict between faith and logic, as a police officer he can only rely on logic and terms this incident as an extraordinary accident. Later at Medha's ancestral house, her dead sister's picture breaks into pieces after Medha plays her radio.

== Cast ==
- Prithviraj Sukumaran as ACP M. Sathyajith IPS
- Aditi Balan as Medha Padmaja, a freelance journalist
- Pooja Mohanraj as Neela Maruthan IPS, a probationer officer
- Anil Nedumangad as CI Siyad Muhammad
- Suchitra Pillai as Zara Zacchai, a blind occult researcher
- Athmiya Rajan as Eva Maria
- Lakshmi Priyaa Chandramouli as Advocate Haritha Moncy Manakkal, Medha's friend
- Rajesh Hebbar as Dr. Mahesh, a forensic surgeon
- Anand as Dr. Aadhavan Padmanabhan
- Dr Divya as Dr. Sana Navas
- Nitha Promy as DCP Malini Raju IPS
- Shibu Laban as SI Satheesh
- Bilas Nair as CI Rajprakash
- Gibin Gopinath as SI Ajithkumar
- Parvathy T as Padmaja, Medha's mother
- Baby Eithal Evana Sherin as Chinmayi / Chinnu
- Vijayakumari as Vasudha
- Azees Nedumangad as Broker Kuncheria
- Srikanth K Vijayan as Darshan Dev
- Ravikrishnan as Thimothy Zacchai
- Kannan Nair as Asif
- Alencier Ley Lopez as Chandrabhanu
- Sanuja Somanath as Roshni
- Usha Karunagappilly as Lissie Philip
- Shabhari as Jio
- Anusree Pothen as Jini
- Surya Mohan as Rafeeqa
- Ravinder Pal J as Philip Karachal
- Bensi Mathews as Commissioner Venkitesh IPS
- Amboori Jayan as Dhandapandi
- Shailaja P. Ambu as Chandrika
- Sanju Ramapuran as Achayan
- Satheesh as tea stall owner
- Biju as Paili
- Rafi Kannadipparamba as Fridge shop helper
- Ramu Mangalapalla as Fridge shop owner
- Viju as House owner
- Ramadevi Ramamurthi as House owner's wife
- Maya Suresh as hostel warden
- Sunil Vikram as Construction site supervisor
- N. Venunath as Home Minister
- Aleena Mary as Malini's daughter
- Sreenath V Nath as News reporter 1
- Jiji as News reporter 2
- Sathya as Amrith Raj
- Robert Aaluva as Aloshi Joseph IPS
- Ashwini as Muslim woman
- Krishnan Nair as Muslim priest
- Sreerag Shine as Muslim boy
- Alphy Panjikaran as Medha's sister (photo presence)

== Production ==
=== Development ===
In September 2020, Prithviraj Sukumaran was reported to play the lead in an investigative thriller directed by cinematographer Tanu Balak in his directorial debut and produced by Anto Joseph. Sreenath V. Nath scripted the film, which was reportedly inspired by real-life incidents. Aditi Balan was cast as a journalist.

=== Filming ===
Principal photography began on 31 October 2020 in Thiruvananthapuram. Prithviraj joined production the following week on 13 November 2020, after having tested positive for COVID-19. The first schedule of the film was completed on 24 November 2020. Filming wrapped on 7 December 2020, spanning 36 days.

== Music ==
The film's soundtrack and film score was composed by Prakash Alex with lyrics written by Sreenath V Nath and Anand Sreeraj. The music album features two songs "Eeran Mukil" sung by K. S. Harisankar, and ''Fire'' sung by Anand Sreeraj, both released on 25 June 2021.

Track listing
No.	Title	Lyrics	Singer(s)	Length
1.	"Eeran Mukil"	Sreenath V. Nath	K. S. Harisankar	04:41
2.	"Fire"	Anand Sreeraj	Anand Sreeraj	04:17

== Release ==
Cold Case was initially planned as a direct-to-video release in December 2020, but was postponed due to post-production delays. The makers later opted for a theatrical release, since theatres were allowed to operate with 50% occupancy, fixing the date as 4 March 2021. However, the film was postponed indefinitely, with the makers reinstating the decision to release the film on an over-the-top media service due to the functioning of theatres being affected due to the second wave of the COVID-19 pandemic. Anto Joseph, the film's producer, officially announced plans for a digital release, with the streaming rights of the film and Fahadh Faasil's Malik being sold to Amazon Prime Video.

In June 2021, it was announced that the film would premiere on 30 June 2021,

Cold Case released worldwide through Amazon Prime Video on 29 June 2021, and was made available for streaming in 240 countries.

== Reception ==
=== Critical response ===
Anna Mathews of The Times of India gave 3 out of 5 stars writing "the film has an innovative story track, with the investigative thriller running on two very different propositions, but in a parallel narrative". Sowmya Rajendran of The News Minute wrote that the screenplay in the first half is "intriguing", but criticised the writing as it had "failed to live up to the ambition of the script" with "the plot becomes less convincing as the film progresses". She rated 3 out of 5 stars in her review. S. R. Praveen of The Hindu called the film as an "underwhelming horror-thriller that squanders the promising premise that it had". He further called "The script is rather weak not just in using the thriller elements, but in the dialogue department too. Quite a few of the sequences have the characters, especially the police officers, stating the obvious to each other. This is compounded by the not so great dubbing for some characters."

Haricharan Pudipeddi of Hindustan Times called that the film "did take the road less taken with the identity of the murderer", but "the experiment needed a bit more work for the role was poorly written". Manoj Kumar R of The Indian Express gave 1-star rating out of 5 and pointed that the film has "a very conventional premise of a dead person seeking justice from beyond the grave or, in this case, out of a rickety fridge". Giving 2.5 out of 5 stars, Anna M. M. Vetticad of Firstpost called that the film is "wisely controlled when it dips into paranormal horror clichés such as sudden loud sounds, ominous music and abrupt movement" and called the film as a "reasonably engaging thriller, but it had the potential to be so much more". Critic Ramya Palisetty of India Today gave 3 out of 5 saying "the film has the right ingredients to keep you on the edge of the seat, but the lazily-written second half tests your patience".

Roktim Rajpal of Deccan Herald rated the film 1.5 out of 5 stars and called "the film fails to make an impact due to the lousy execution". Gauthaman Bhaskaran of News18 called the film as an "extremely amateurish attempt" with a "shoddily-written script that completely wastes Prithviraj's potential, which transformed him into a robotic-run-of the mill man". Meera Jacob, for the news magazine The Week, gave 3 out of 5 stars and called "the movie does hold the attention of the viewer, particularly during the first half. However, moving toward the climax, it seemed to have been a bit of a let-down [sic]... he mixing of genre holds an optimistic future when executed properly." Sajin Srijith of Cinema Express gave 2 out of 5 stars, and said "The film's eagerness to get to the final twist comes at the cost of not-so engaging storytelling". Sangita Nambiar of The Quint, gave 2.5 out of 5 stars rating, calling it as "a paranormal thriller meets police procedural, is a better-than-many watch but definitely not the best or one of the best, it is a watchable thriller, just have reasonably low expectations from it".

Arjun Menon of Pinkvilla gave 3 stars out of 5 calling the film as "an old fashioned crime thriller that is designed to evoke the feel of a horror flick and murder mystery simultaneously which does offer a fairly neat premise with little fuzz and great precision in storytelling". Giving 3 out of 5, Sify called the film as an "okayish thriller", with "an almost predictable track and cliched moments".
