= Oru Jaathi Jaathakam =

- Theatrical release poster
- Directed by: M. Mohanan
- Written by: Rakesh Mantodi
- Co-writer: Sharesh Malayankandy
- Produced by: Maha Subair
- Starring: Vineeth Sreenivasan; Nikhila Vimal; Babu Antony; Kayadu Lohar; Isha Talwar; Pooja Mohanraj; Mridul Nair
- Cinematography: Viswajith Odukkathil
- Edited by: Ranjan Abraham
- Music by: Guna Balasubramanian
- Production company: Varnachithra Big Screen
- Distributed by: Varnachithra Big Screen
- Release date: 31 January 2025
- Running time: 124 minutes
- Country: India
- Language: Malayalam
- Budget: ₹4.55 crores
- Box office: ₹7.23 crores

Oru Jaathi Jathakam (also marketed as Oru Jaathi Oru Jathakam) (transl. One peculiar horoscope) is a 2025 Indian Malayalam-language romantic comedy film directed by M. Mohanan and written by Rakesh Mantodi. It stars Vineeth Sreenivasan, Nikhila Vimal, Babu Antony, Kayadu Lohar, Isha Talwar, Pooja Mohanraj and Mridul Nair.

The film released on 31 January 2025 with average reviews and was a moderate success at box office.

== Plot ==
Revolves around the life story of man named Mambrath Jayesh in north malabar. When a girl named Sinitha, who is an expert in palmistry, requests Jayesh to display his hand, he eagerly obliges. But when she tells him that this will be the worst time of his life, it surprises him.

Sinitha continues by predicting that he will be ridiculed by many in his life and that he will ultimately create a great deal of trouble. Later on, she warns him once more that the real danger is within. Furthermore, the spectator is shown a series of turbulent events in Jayesh's life, suggesting that Sinitha's claims are true. Numerous young women he meets also have significant roles in everything that goes on in his life.

== Cast ==
- Vineeth Sreenivasan as Mambrath Jayesh Nambiar
- Nikhila Vimal as Sinitha
- Babu Antony as Ramesh Babu
- Kayadu Lohar as Payal
- Indu Thampi as Pallavi
- Chippy Devassy as Merin
- P. P. Kunhikrishnan as Mambrath Raghavan Nambiar
- Amal Thaha as Aneesh
- Isha Talwar as Thathrikutty
- Pooja Mohanraj as Latha
- Sayanora Philip as Baby
- Mridul Nair as Jithesh
- Aishwarya Midhun Koroth as Gopika
- Shaun Romy as Krishna
- Ranji Kankol as Prasanth
- Rejitha Madhu as Hemaletha
- Varsha Ramesh as Meghna
- Arvind Reghu as Kattu
- Sharoon Lakshman as Transgender
- Sivadas Kannur as Train passenger
- Sarath Sabha as Mejin Mathew
- Haritha Parokod as Suchithra
- Nirmal Palazhi as Poojari
- Vijayakrishnan
- Anusree Ajithan as Likhina
- Sreelakshmi Meledath as Nunu
- Sruthi Manikandan
- Divakaran Vishnumangalam
- Vidhu Prathap as Gopalakrishnan

== Production ==
Filming began in July 2023 in Kochi.

== Release ==
Oru Jaathi Jathakam was released in theatres on 31 January 2025.

== Reception ==
=== Critical reception ===
Rohit Panikker of Times Now rated the film 3/5 stars and wrote, "If not for anything, Oru Jaathi Jaathakam is an interesting watch just to find out which part of the whole correctness debate you might stand on. The film has its share of light-hearted moments, memorable performances, and quite a lot of laugh-out-loud moments if you can relate to the kind of humour presented here."

Sanjith Sidhardhan of OTTPlay rated the film 3/5 stars and wrote, "One of the grouses of the past few years has been that there haven’t been enough comedies in Malayalam. Oru Jaathi Jaathakam does offer an opportunity for the audience to laugh out loud in theatres, thanks to Vineeth’s performances and some hilarious situations that the character finds himself in."

Anna Mathews of The Times of India rated the film 2.5/5 stars and described the film as an "old-fashioned comedy that doesn’t really click." She wrote, "Oru Jaathi Jaathakam has some lighthearted, good moments, and some lessons, but the second half just stretches out endlessly. And with Malayalam cinema today being appreciated for fresh content, brilliant actors and its technical standards, this film feels a bit old-fashioned, like Jayesh's views."

Vignesh Madhu of The New Indian Express rated the film 1.5/5 stars and wrote, "Oru Jaathi Jaathakam had the potential to be a compelling character study on a conservative and flawed individual, but the focus seems to be solely on turning everything into a comedy, even if it means resorting to a brand of humour that the industry has collectively been trying to run away from."

Anandu Suresh of The Indian Express rated the film 1.5/5 stars and wrote, "Although the film is likely to impress those with regressive mindsets, giving them plenty to laugh at, Oru Jaathi Jathakam suffers from subpar writing too overall. Many scenes seem to exist solely to accommodate jokes, resulting in a lack of narrative cohesion. Consequently, despite its relatively short runtime of just over 120 minutes, the film starts to feel unnecessarily prolonged, lacking sufficient substance to sustain its length. By the final act, a series of mini-twists unfold one after another, but instead of adding intrigue, they become overwhelming and excessive."

Cris of The News Minute wrote that Oru Jaathi Jaathakam "is all lost in the mayhem of a script that goes wrong in so many different ways, from the continually failing attempts at comedy to the totally distasteful depiction of the queer community. The sad part is, Vineeth Sreenivasan, playing the lead, gives his best – only, it goes wasted like a nice little ingredient thrown into a very poor recipe of bad writing and execution."

Nainu Oommen of The Hindu wrote, "Overall, Oru Jaathi Jaathakam is an enjoyable watch as it manages to open up discussions about topics that require a stage. It does not falter in its execution of humour making a clear distinction between laughing at and laughing about certain things."

Princy Alexander of Onmanorama wrote, "Overall, the film can be enjoyed for the situation, performances and the storyline, but may be challenged for its middling treatment.

== Controversies ==
The film was banned in the GCC (excluding Oman) for its LGBTQ+ themes

On February 8, 2025, The Kerala High Court issued a notice against the film, responding to a petition moved by Shakiya S. Priyamvada alleging that certain dialogues in the film are derogatory and humiliating towards the LGBTQ+ community.

On March 14, 2025, the film was scheduled to stream on ManoramaMax but was postponed due to legal and censorship issues from the Kerala High Court.
