= Antony Varghese =

Indian film actor

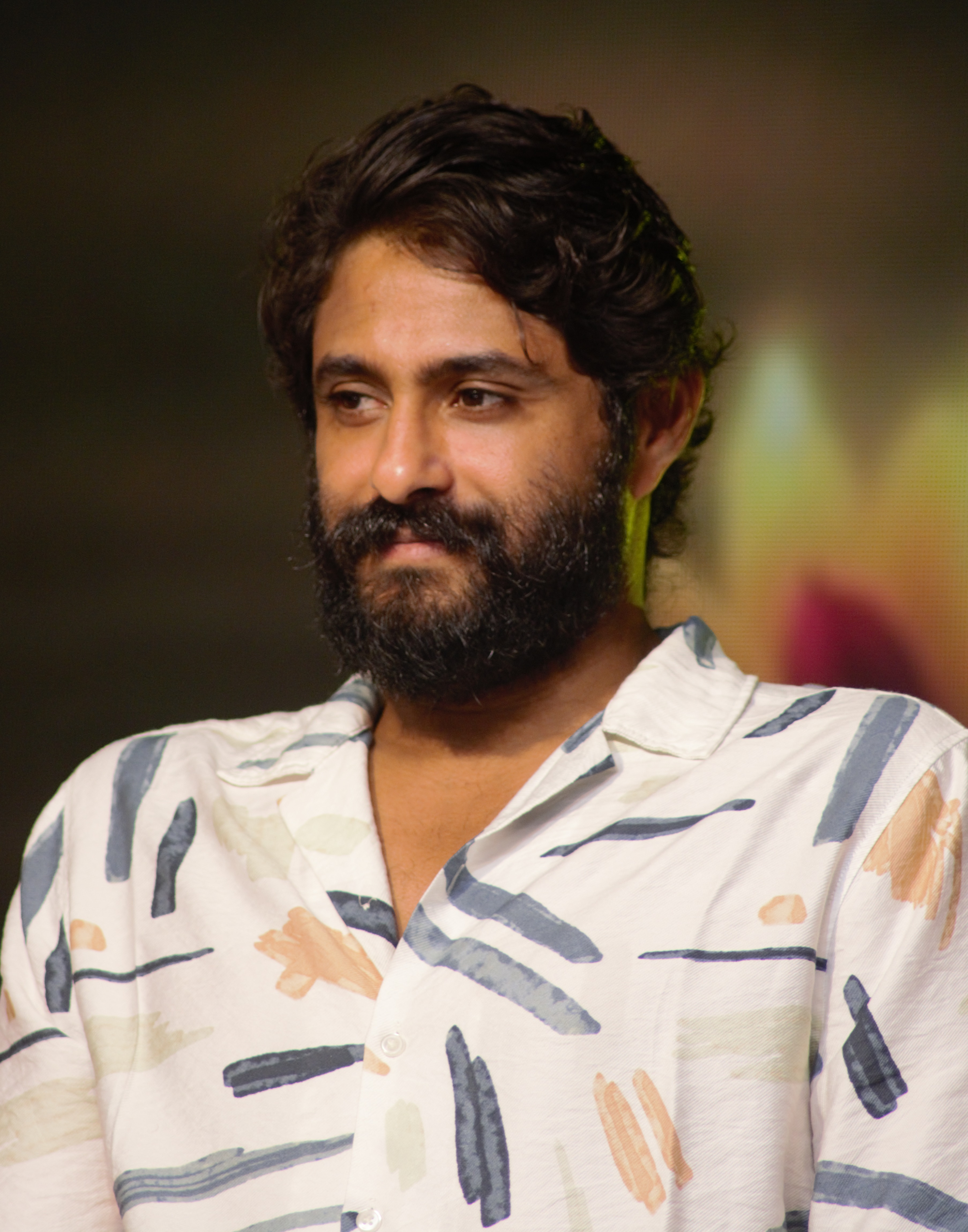
- Varghese in 2025
- Born: 11 October 1989 (age 37); Angamaly, Kerala, India
- Education: Maharaja's College, Ernakulam
- Occupation: Actor
- Years active: 2017–present
- Notable work: Angamaly Diaries
- Spouse: Anisha Poulose (m. 2021)

Antony Varghese, also known by his screen name Pepe, is an Indian actor who appears in Malayalam films. He made his acting debut in 2017 through the film Angamaly Diaries.

== Personal life ==
Antony Varghese was born in Angamaly, Kerala to Varghese and Alphonsa on 11 October 1989. He did his graduation in Maharaja's College, Ernakulam. On 7 August 2021, he married his longtime girlfriend, Aneesha Paulose.

== Career ==
Antony Varghese made his debut in 2017 by portraying the lead role of Vincent Pepe in Angamaly Diaries, which was directed by Lijo Jose Pellissery. The film became a blockbuster which rose him to fame and is now well known by his screen name Pepe. The character took him to great heights and won several awards including Filmfare Awards South. His second film was Swathandriam Ardharathriyil which was directed by debutant Tinu Pappachan. It is a Kottayam-based action thriller. Antony signed Jallikattu marking his second collaboration with Lijo Jose Pellissery. Both the films were commercially successful while Jallikattu was nominated as one of India's Oscar entries under the feature film category, and the actor's performance was critically acclaimed. His film Ajagajantharam marks his second collaboration with Tinu Pappachan, which was released on 23 December 2021, where it was praised for its well-choreographed action sequences and became a commercial success at the box office.

In 2022, Antony played a cameo role in Super Sharanya.

In 2023 he played one of the lead roles in RDX along with Shane Nigam and Neeraj Madhav.

== Filmography ==
=== Films ===
Key
†	Denotes films that have not yet been released

Year	Title	Role	Notes	Ref
2017	Angamaly Diaries	Vincent Pepe	Debut Film	
2018	Swathandriam Ardharathriyil	Jacob		
2019	Jallikkattu	Antony		
2021	Ajagajantharam	Lali		
2022	Super Sharanya	Sumeshettan	Cameo appearance	
2022	Innale Vare	Vinod Sreedhar / Sharath		
2022	Aanaparambile World Cup	Hesham		
2022	Oh Meri Laila	Lailasuran		
2023	Poovan	Hari		
2023	RDX	Dony		
2023	Chaaver	Kiran		
2024	Kondal	Manuel		
2025	Daveed	Aashiq Abu		
2025	Maine Pyar Kiya	Danny	Cameo appearance	
2026	Kattalan	Antony Varghese		
2026	I'm Game	Vignesh Das "Vicky"	Extended cameo	
2026	Disco	Yoyaki		
2026	Thottam †	TBA	Filming	

=== Short films ===
Year	Title	Role	Notes
2018	Mouse Trap	Subash Chandra Bose	Malayalam Short Film
2021	Wabi Sabi	Himself	Travel Vlog

== Awards ==
Year	Award	Category	Film	Result	Ref.
2018	Filmfare Awards South	South Filmfare Award for Best Malayalam Male Debut	Angamaly Diaries	Won	
