= Maradona (2018 film) =

2018 film

- Theatrical release poster
- Directed by: Vishnu Narayan
- Written by: Krishna Moorthy
- Produced by: S. Vinod Kumar
- Starring: Tovino Thomas; Chemban Vinod Jose; Sharanya R. Nair; Leona Lishoy; Maya Menon; Shalu Rahim; Tito Wilson; Kichu Tellus; Nistar Ahmed; Jins Baskar; Niranjan Harish
- Cinematography: Deepak D. Menon
- Edited by: Saiju Sreedharan
- Music by: Sushin Shyam
- Production company: Mini Studio
- Release date: 27 July 2018
- Country: India
- Language: Malayalam
- Budget: ₹4 crores
- Box office: ₹7 crores

Maradona is an Indian Malayalam-language thriller film directed by debutant Vishnu Narayan and starring Tovino Thomas in the title role. It was written by Krishna Moorthy and produced by Mini Studio. The film's background score and songs were composed by Sushin Shyam, while the cinematography was performed by Deepak D. Menon and edited by Saiju Sreedharan. Despite its title, the film has nothing to do with Argentine professional football player and manager Diego Maradona.

== Plot ==
The movie follows the story of a goon for hire, Maradona, a cranky young man who moves to Bangalore to stay with his distant relatives, after accidentally injuring a powerful politician's son. However, the politician hires a goon named Martin to track down Maradona and his friend Sudhi, who picked up a fight with the man's son, Aravindan, and has lost his memory after the incident.

Maradona befriends many people in the apartment, like Ousepachan, an old man living all alone in the apartment opposite to that of his. He also befriends Asha who is a home nurse at the apartment next door, shortly before falling in love with her. Simultaneously he is informed by Sudhi and another friend of his, about the events taking place at their hometown. As the film's interval is over, the incident forcing Maradona and Sudhi to beat up the rogue Aravindan is shown. Later, Martin and his gang find Sudhi and lock him up in a hideout after beating him severely. Maradona watches a story in a news channel in which a man is being severely beaten by a group of goons and identified it was Sudhi. He confesses to Asha about his past as a goon and she leaves him. Ousepachan calms him down saying that Asha will return to him once she gets to know about his true feelings. Later, Martin and his gang arrives at the apartment to look for Maradona, but learn that a robbery had happened at the apartment in which he was living, and also that he is missing since the previous day. Maradona had gone to Aravindan's house, to apologise to his mother as he is the one behind the guy's condition. Maradona surrenders and is now locked up with Sudhi. He is happy to see a still alive Sudhi, as he had earlier thought that Sudhi was killed. Maradona also gets a call from Asha who is now a nurse in a hospital somewhere. Sudhi is repentant now, especially for ruining his wife's life, someone who had loved and married him knowing his past. So he asks Maradona to not let go of Asha. Later, Sudhi succumbs to his injuries. When Martin and his friend arrives, Maradona overpowers them to escape. The last scene shows Maradona on a journey to West Bengal (probably where Asha is), with Aravindan who doesn't remember who Maradona is (and that he is the one behind his condition). Maradona assures Aravindan's mother that he will return with Aravindan once he learns that his dear ones are safe. We also see Ousepachan returning the valuables that were missing from the apartment, revealing that Maradona had faked a robbery for the safety of his loved ones.

== Cast ==
- Tovino Thomas as Maradona
- Chemban Vinod Jose as Martin
- Sharanya R. Nair as Asha
- Leona Lishoy as Nadhiya
- Shalu Rahim as Aravindhan
- Tito Wilson as Sudhi
- Kichu Tellus as Anto
- Parthavi Vinod as Diya, Nadhiya's daughter
- Niranjan Harish as Naresh
- Hari Thampuran as Ousepachan
- Nisthar Sait as Koyikkal Chandrashekaran
- Jins Baskar as Sree
- Vishnu as Nizam
- Sam the dog as Rambo

== Production ==
The film marks the directorial debut of Vishnu Narayan, who had earlier associated Aashiq Abu, Dileesh Pothen, and Samir Thahir. It was written by Krishna Moorthy, who had also been associated with Lijo Jose Pellisery and Dileesh Pothen. The film was produced by S. Vinod Kumar under the banner Mini Studio. Sukumar Thekkepat was the executive producer of the film and the camera was handled by Deepak D. Menon.

Maradona began filming in August 2017 and was wrapped in December 2017. The film was mainly shot in Chavakkad, Bangalore, Vandiperiyar, Aluva, and Ernakulam.

== Release ==
The film was released on 27 July 2018 across 128 theaters in Kerala.

=== Reception ===
Baradwaj Rangan rated 3 out of 5 stars in Film Companion. Asha Prakash for The Times of India has written that Vishnu Narayan's Maradona is a movie in which the journey is more interesting than the destination. She has mentioned that the film rightly belongs to Tovino and can be considered a celebration of the actor in him. Abhijith for Filmibeat has written that Maradona is a neatly packaged film which offers a compelling viewing experience. "The best part of Maradona is the fact that the film keeps the audiences hooked to it with the elements in the movie. The narrative pattern of the film is appealing and it is refreshing to watch certain events unfold in a rather tricky manner," he added. Also, the film had been rated as 4 out 5 by The New Indian Express.

== Soundtrack ==
The music of the film was composed by Sushin Shyam.

Maradona

Soundtrack album by Sushin Shyam
- Released: 21 July 2018
- Genre: Feature film soundtrack
- Length: 21:23
- Language: Malayalam
- Label: Mini Studio
- Producer: Sushin Shyam

Sushin Shyam chronology
Villain (2017)	Maradona (2018)	Rosapoo (2018)
External audio
- Audio Jukebox on YouTube

Maradona (Original Motion Picture Soundtrack) - Original version
No.	Title	Lyrics	Singer(s)	Length
1.	"Aparaada Panka"	Fejo	Fejo	03:37
2.	"Ee Raavil"	Nezer Ahemed	Nezer Ahemed	03:35
3.	"Kadhale"	Vinayak Sasikumar	Sruthy Sasidharan	03:26
4.	"Nilapakshi"	Vinayak Sasikumar	Sushin Shyam, Neha S. Nair	03:49
5.	"NilaPakshi Sad version"	Vinayak Sasikumar	Sushin Shyam, Neha S. Nair	04:15
6.	"Varum"	Vinayak Sasikumar	Sushin Shyam, Neha S. Nair	03:55
Total length:				22:37
