= Jawan of Vellimala =

2012 film

- Theatrical release poster
- Directed by: Anoop Kannan
- Written by: James Albert
- Produced by: Mammootty
- Starring: Mammootty; Sreenivasan; Leona Lishoy; Mamta Mohandas; Asif Ali; Baburaj; Niyas Backer
- Cinematography: Satheesh Kurup
- Music by: Bijibal
- Production company: Playhouse Studio
- Distributed by: Playhouse Release & PJ Entertainments
- Release date: 19 October 2012
- Country: India
- Language: Malayalam

Jawan of Vellimala (transl. The Soldier of Vellimala) is a 2012 Malayalam film written by James Albert and directed by debutant Anoop Kannan. It stars Mammootty, Sreenivasan, Mamta Mohandas, and Asif Ali.

== Cast ==
- Mammootty as Gopikrishnan, retired soldier, Indian Army
- Asif Ali as Koshi Oommen
- Sreenivasan as Varghese
- Mamta Mohandas as Deepa
- Leona Lishoy as Jenny Varghese
- Ann Sheetal as Jenny's friend
- Baburaj as Chacko
- Joji as a dam security guard
- Sunil Sukhada as Ittichan
- Joju George as Vinu
- Kottayam Nazeer as Rafi
- Niyas Backer as Shibu
- Sadiq
- Ranjith as Dr. Shivaprasad (cameo)
- Devan as Lt Col.Rajagopal (cameo)
- Vineeth Sreenivasan as Narrator(Voice-only)

== Release and reception ==
Sify gave the movie a negative review adding "Jawan of Vellimala is a messy tale that can surprise you with its hollowness. An amateurish effort at best, this film is unintentionally funny at times and lacks much fizz." The noted reviewer of Sify Moviebuzz makes it clear that the movie collapsed in all aspects and establishes his arguments with several examples, giving the verdict as "below average" and moreover a very amateurish effort at its best.

Rediff.com gave the movie a negative rating of 2 out of 5 stars. Rediff.com critic Paresh C. Palicha furnishes the review heading as "Nothing new in Jawan of Vellimala" and added, "At the end, Jawan of Vellimala, which held so much promise in the beginning, just fizzles out."

The Times of India gave the movie a negative rating of 2 out of 5 stars stating "Finally, when it happens, what is intended to be a glorious end, looks plainly dramatic and even a blessed actor like Mammootty fails to shoulder the burden" and concludes with a note "Jawan of Vellimala lacks appeal not because it is predictable, but because of the shocking manner in which it ruins what could have been a promising plot."

indiaglitz gave the movie a rating of 6/10 adding "The execution of 'Jawan of Vellimala' certainly ruins the possibilities of a great movie from a promising plot. But the movie will be fine for a onetime watch, if you don't go with bigger expectations."

== Soundtrack ==
All music is composed by Bijibal.

Songs
No.	Title	Lyrics	Singers	Length
1.	"Onnam Kunnume"	Anil Panachooran	Mammootty	1:35
2.	"Pora Niranjoru"	Anil Panachooran	Rakesh Brahmandan	4:02
3.	"Aalum Aarum"	Santhosh Varma	Bijibal	4:28
4.	"Marayumo"	R. Venugopal	Harish Sivaramakrishnan	4:33
5.	"Ozhuki Njan"	Santhosh Varma	K. S. Chitra	4:36
6.	"Marayumo (Remix)"	R. Venugopal	Harish Shivaramakrishnan	4:05

== Box office ==
The film collected around US$1710 from the first weekend from the UK box office.
