= Chemban Vinod Jose =

Indian actor, film producer, and screenwriter

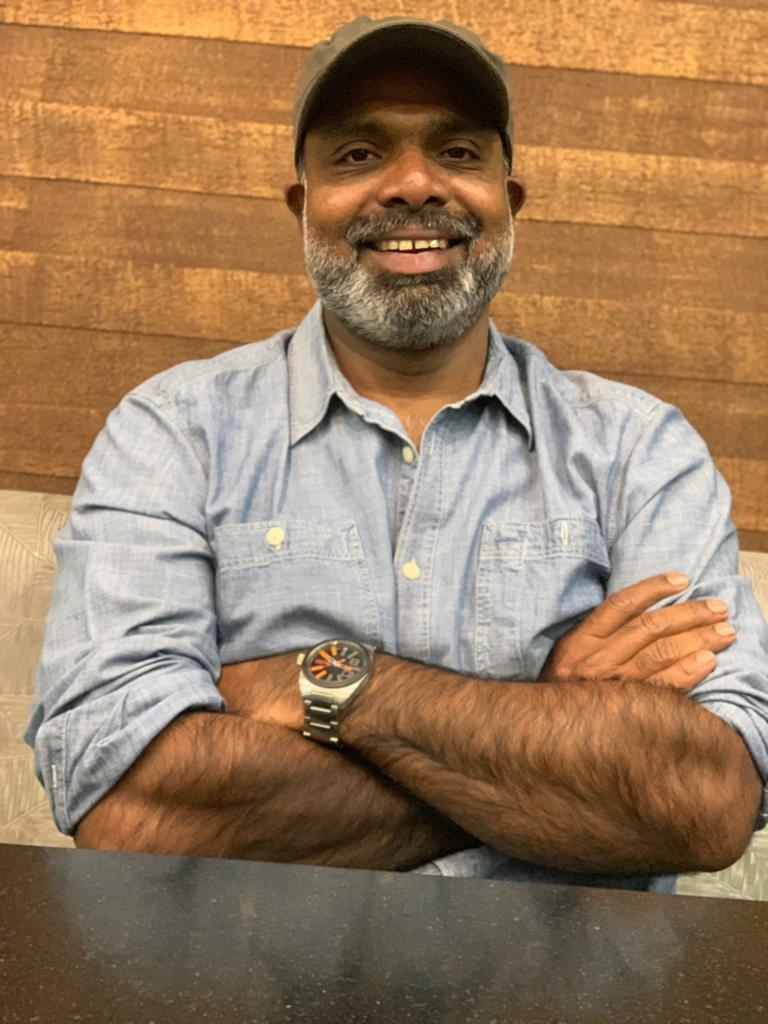
- Vinod at an event
- Born: Vinod Jose; 24 May 1976 (age 50); Angamaly, Kerala, India
- Occupations: Actor; screenwriter; film producer; physiotherapist
- Years active: 2010–present
- Spouses: Sunitha (m. 2010; div. 2019) Mariam Thomas (m. 2020)
- Children: 1
- Relatives: Ullas Chemban (brother)

Chemban Vinod Jose (born 24 May 1976) is an Indian actor, film producer and screenwriter, who predominantly works in Malayalam films. He is a physiotherapist by profession. He is an established character actor and has appeared in over 50 films, mostly in comedic roles.

He is best known for his performance in Ee.Ma.Yau. (2018), Amen (2013), Tamaar Padaar (2014), Sapthamashree Thaskaraha (2014), Iyobinte Pusthakam (2014), Kohinoor (2015),Oru Second Class Yathra (2015), Churuli (2021) and Vikram (2022).

== Career ==
He made his acting debut with the 2010 crime film Nayakan, playing an antagonistic role.

In 2017, Chemban Vinod made his screenwriter debut with the crime drama Angamaly Diaries, a major critical and commercial success in Malayalam that year. In the following year, he co-produced the thriller Swathanthryam Ardharathriyil. In 2018, he won the Best Actor Award at 49th International Film Festival of India for his leading role in Ee.Ma.Yau.

== Awards ==
- Vanita Film Award for Best Supporting Actor
- Vanita Film Award for Best Villain
- 6th South Indian International Movie Awards for Best Actor in a Negative Role Malayalam
- 5th South Indian International Movie Awards for Best Supporting Actor Malayalam
- 49th International Film Festival of India - IFFI Best Actor Award (Male)

== Filmography ==
Key
†	Denotes films that have not yet been released

=== As actor ===
- All films are in Malayalam language unless otherwise noted.

Year	Title	Role(s)	Notes
2010	Nayakan	Saravanan	
2011	City of God	Maruth	
2011	Bombay March 12	Firoz	
2011	Collector	Iqbal	
2012	Friday	Boat Driver Devassi	
2012	Ordinary	Inspector Benny Idikula	
2013	Kili Poyi	Smuggler	
2013	Amen	Pailakkutty	
2013	5 Sundarikal	Joshy	Segment: Aami
2013	Kaanchi	Perachan	
2013	Kadal Kadannu Oru Maathukutty	Sameer	
2013	North 24 Kaatham	Musthafa	
2013	Koottathil Oral	Velu	
2014	Happy Journey	Ambi	
2014	Masala Republic	Perumbavoor Ajayan	
2014	Samsaaram Aarogyathinu Haanikaram	Saalsa Kuttan	
2014	Tamaar Padaar	Tube Light Mani	
2014	Sapthamashree Thaskaraha	Martin	
2014	Iyobinte Pustakam	Dimitri	
2014	Oru Korean Padam	Peethambaran	
2015	Aadu Oru Bheegara Jeeviyanu	Highrange Hakkem	
2015	Oru Second Class Yathra	Maran	
2015	Onnam Loka Mahayudham	Altaf	
2015	Chandrettan Evideya	Janan	
2015	Nee-Na	Kari Oil	
2015	Double Barrel	Diesel	
2015	Urumbukal Urangarilla	Benny	
2015	Kohinoor	Nicholas	
2015	Lord Livingstone 7000 Kandi	Prof. N. Neelakandan	
2015	Charlie	Mathai / Pathrose	
2016	Paavada	Fr. Kattipparamban	
2016	Darvinte Parinamam	Darvin	
2016	Kali	Chakkara Shaji	
2016	Shikhamani	Shikamani	
2016	Oppam	Anandhan R, CI	
2016	Ore Mukham	ACP Ashok Chandra IPS	
2017	Angamaly Diaries	Himself (Guest Appearance)	Also script writer
2017	Georgettan's Pooram	Peter Mathai	
2017	Varnyathil Aashanka	Wilson	
2017	Thrissivaperoor Kliptham	David Pauly	
2017	Velipadinte Pusthakam	Kaakka Rameshan	
2017	Villain	DYSP Iqbal	
2018	Swathanthryam Ardharathriyil	Devassi	
2018	Ee.Ma.Yau	Eeshi	
2018	Maradona	Martin	
2018	Goli Soda 2	Thillai	Tamil film
2018	Dakini	Mayan	
2018	Looty		Kannada film
2019	Porinju Mariam Jose	Puthanpally Jose	
2019	Jallikkattu	Varkey	
2019	Puzhikkadakan	Samuel	
2020	Trance	Isaac Thomas	
2021	Churuli	Antony	
2021	Bheemante Vazhi	Maharshi	
2021	Ajagajantharam	Aliyan	
2022	Vikram	Jose	Tamil film
2022	Thallumaala	Omega Babu	Cameo appearance
2022	Pathonpatham Noottandu	Kayamkulam Kochunni	
2022	The Teacher	Mani	
2022	Chattambi	John	
2023	Romancham	Sayed	
2023	Boomerang	SI Jayadevan	
2023	Neelavelicham	Raviyettan	
2023	Sulaikha Manzil	Sameer	
2023	Nalla Nilavulla Rathri	Irumban	
2023	King of Kotha	Ranjith Bhai	
2023	Pulimada	SI Ashokan	
2023	Antony	Fr. Paul Kattakayam	
2024	Anchakkallakokkan	Nadavaramban Peter	
2024	Alangu	Augustine	Tamil film
2025	Pravinkoodu Shappu	Suni	
2025	Get-Set Baby	CI Rahim Abdul Rawther	
2025	Idi Mazha Kaattu		
2025	Thalaivan Thalaivii	Arasaangam	Tamil film
2026	Disco	Vediamo	

=== As screenwriter ===
Year	Title	Director	Notes
2017	Angamaly Diaries	Lijo Jose Pellissery	
2021	Bheemante Vazhi	Ashraf Hamza	
2026	Disco	Ullas Chemban	

=== As producer ===
Year	Title	Director	Notes
2018	Swathanthryam Ardharathriyil	Tinu Pappachan	Co-produced with BC Joshi and Lijo Jose Pellissery
2019	Thamaasha	Ashraf Hamza	Co-produced with Sameer Thahir, Shyju Khalid and Lijo Jose Pellissery
2019	Jallikkattu	Lijo Jose Pellissery	Co-produced with O.Thomas Panicker and Lijo Jose Pellissery
2021	Churuli	Lijo Jose Pellissery	Co-produced with O.Thomas Panicker and Lijo Jose Pellissery
2021	Bheemante Vazhi	Ashraf Hamza	Co-produced with Aashiq Abu and Rima Kallingal
2023	Sulaikha Manzil	Ashraf Hamza	Co-produced with Subeesh Kannancheri and Sameer Karat
2024	Anchakkallakokkan	Ullas Chemban	Co-produced with Abbas Puthuparambil, Sajin Ali Pulakkal and Hamza Thirunavaya
