= Swathanthryam Ardharathriyil =

- Theatrical release poster
- Directed by: Tinu Pappachan
- Written by: Dileep Kurian
- Produced by: B. C. Joshi; Lijo Jose Pellissery; Chemban Vinod Jose
- Starring: Antony Varghese; Vinayakan; Chemban Vinod Jose; Tito Wilson; Arya Salim
- Cinematography: Girish Gangadharan
- Edited by: Shameer Muhammed
- Music by: Jakes Bejoy; Deepak Alexander
- Production company: Soorya Cinema
- Distributed by: RD Illuminations
- Release date: 31 March 2018 (India)
- Running time: 137 minutes
- Country: India
- Language: Malayalam

Swathanthryam Ardharathriyil (also spelt Swathandriam Ardharathriyil) (transl. Freedom at Midnight) is a 2018 Indian Malayalam-language prison action thriller film directed by Tinu Pappachan from a script written by Dileep Kurian and produced by B. C. Joshi, Lijo Jose Pellissery and Chemban Vinod Jose. The film stars Antony Varghese, Vinayakan, Chemban Vinod Jose, Tito Wilson and Arya Salim.

Swathanthryam Ardharathriyil was released on 31 March 2018 and became a box office success.

== Plot ==
Betty gets arrested on murder charges, while her lover Jacob Varghese is on the run. Jacob tactfully misleads the police and flees with Betty. They go into hiding and plan to flee India. On their way to collect their passports, Betty gets involved in a protest and is admitted to a hospital while Jacob gets arrested. At the police station, Jacob is ruthlessly handled by the police, and finds his inmates as arrogant and unsympathetic, where he decides to escape. Jacob shares his desire with another inmate named Simon, who eventually agrees to join him as he is desperate to meet his family. The advocate of Appachan, a rich businessman, questions Jacob about the location of a man called Charlie, but Jacob remains calm and tells that he doesn't know Charlie. Simon asks Jacob about Appachan and Charlie, where Jacob reveals his past.

Past: Jacob was the manager of Appachan's company and Charlie was Appachan's driver. Charlie was keen to take revenge on Appachan as he killed his father. During this time, Jacob met and fell in love with Betty. Meanwhile, SI James had kidnapped and killed a girl named Indu, where Betty became the sole witness and tells James' involvement in Indu's death. James gets released on bail, where he tortures Betty, but Jacob kills him in anger. Jacob tells everything to Charlie, who in turn robs 35 million from Appachan's company. Charlie goes to Australia and promises Jacob that he will return to take him and Betty. Betty is in a convent from where she is arrested.

Present: Simon and Jacob plans to escape and somehow makes the other inmates leave their cell. Meanwhile, a thief named Devassy and a migrant worker Ramu arrives, where they also plan to escape with Simon and Jacob. However, the police find marijuana in Simon's cell. Jacob digs a hole through the toilet of his cell down the drainage and into the compound, where he starts building the tunnel a bit-by-bit with the help of Devassy, Ramu and two other thieves, who are basically twins who initially hated the escape plan, but later agreed after learning that they have been falsely accused. A new inmate arrives on the charge of molestation, where Jacob and his gang somehow evade him. With whom Jacob had a fight earlier, Udayan arrives at their cell to foil their plan.

Appachan sends some goons in the prison to brutally torture Jacob so that he would confess about Charlie's location and then kill him. The gang involves Simon, who in turn helps Jacob and his gang. Jacob blackmails Udayan and asks him to remain silent so that he can also escape. During the night, Jacob, Simon, Devassy, Udayan, Ramu and the twin brothers start their escape down the tunnel. In the tunnel, Jacob and Udayan get into a fight, but Jacob successfully beats Udayan and escapes. The police are alerted, where Udayan is caught and brutally thrashed. They start chasing the other men who escaped. All of them escape by jumping into a river, except the twin brothers, where one of whom gets hit by a police jeep. Later, Jacob manages to help Betty escape from the hospital. Devassy and Ramu will reach West Bengal in 2–3 days. Simon and his gang escape in another boat and also made bail arrangements for the twin brothers. They leave for Australia, where Charlie is settled.

== Cast ==
- Antony Varghese as Jacob Varghese
- Vinayakan as Simon
- Chemban Vinod Jose as Devassya
- Sinoj Varghese as Girijan
- Aswathy Manoharan as Betty
- Arya Salim as Ancy
- Rajesh Sharma as Jail warden
- Tito Wilson as Udayan
- Kichu Tellus as Charlie
- Lijo Jose Pellissery as Appachan's lawyer
- Anil Nedumangad as SI James
- Dinesh Prabhakar as Murugan

== Soundtrack ==
The film's music was composed by Jakes Bejoy, with lyrics penned by Joe Paul.

#	Title	Performer(s)
1	Doore Vazhikalil	Shreekumar Vakkiyil

== Production ==
Swathanthryam Ardharathriyil is the directorial debut of Tinu Pappachan, a former associate-director to Lijo Jose Pellissery (who also co-produced the film with Chemban Vinod Jose) and scripted by his close friend Dileep Kurian. Pappachan describes the film as an "action thriller" with the story set in a sub-jail and revolving around prisoners in remand. The jail sequences were shot in Thiruvananthapuram, a jail set was used for the extensive night shoots.

== Release ==
The film was released in India on 31 March 2018, distributed by B. Unnikrishnan's RD Illuminations.

== Reception ==
=== Critical response ===
Behindwoods gave 3/5 stars and wrote "There are two kinds of good movies, one that has an exceptionally good story, and the other that has an exceptionally good making. Swathanthryam Ardharathriyil falls into the latter genre with its applaudable treatment, which forces the viewer to turn a blind eye to any shortcomings, including the small loose ends." Nitya Punnackal of Onmanorama gave 3/5 stars and wrote "Like every jailbreak movie ever, the lead character makes a flawless plan, yet brings a surprise element to his fellow escapees and audience. The movie has drawn inspirations from The Shawshank Redemption, Escape Plan and literally every popular jailbreak movie. It [Swathanthryam Ardharathriyil] may not be the perfect jailbreak movie, but it is arguably one of the best jail movies ever made in Malayalam."

Sanjith Sidhardhan of The Times of India gave 3.5/5 stars and wrote "Contrary to the film's trailer, the violence is minimum in this taut action thriller, which prides itself in using the smarts; and that's what makes this jailbreak movie an arresting watch." Anna MM Vetticad of Firstpost wrote "If Swathanthriyam Ardharathriyil still remains entertaining, it is because Pappachan's adept direction, his cast's appeal and his tech team's sophistication keep the thrills going when all else falters. The atmospherics, the haunting ugliness of that prison complex and the suspense hold out enough excitement to make this a watchable albeit flawed film."

== Remake ==
The film was remade in Tamil as Thugs.
