= Lijo Jose Pellissery =

Indian filmmaker, actor (born 1978)

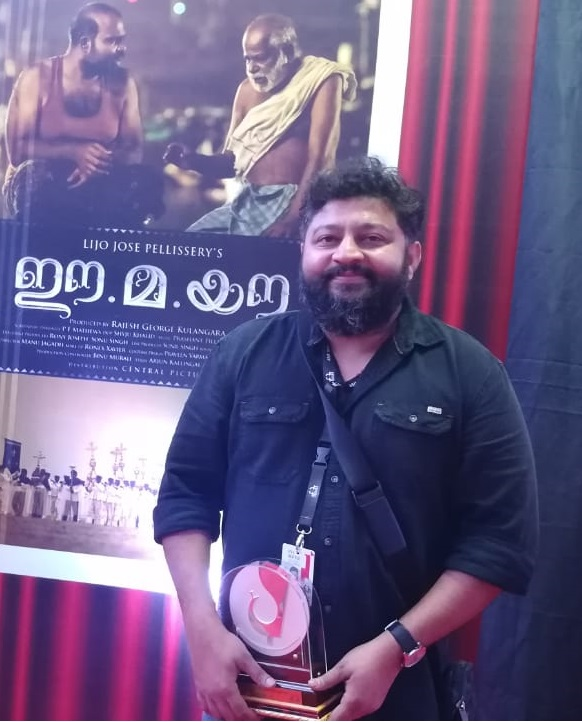
- Pellissery at IFFI 2018
- Born: 18 September 1978 (age 48); Chalakudy, Kerala, India
- Other name: LJP
- Education: Union Christian College, Aluva; Indian Institute of Plantation Management Bangalore
- Occupations: Filmmaker; actor
- Years active: 2010–present
- Spouse: Jasmine James
- Father: Jose Pellissery
- Awards: Kerala State Film Awards (2); IFFI (2); IFFK (2)

Lijo Jose Pellissery (born 18 September 1978) is an Indian filmmaker and actor who works in Malayalam cinema. His best known works include Amen (2013), Angamaly Diaries (2017), Ee.Ma.Yau. (2018), Jallikattu (2019), Churuli (2021), and Nanpakal Nerathu Mayakkam (2023).

Pellissery is a recipient of the Best Director Award at the 48th Kerala State Film Awards for Ee.Ma.Yau., Best Director Award at the 50th Kerala State Film Awards for Jallikattu, Best Film Award at the 44th Kerala Film Critics Association Awards for Jallikattu and twice recipient of Silver Peacock-Best Director at the 49th International Film Festival of India and 50th International Film Festival of India for his films Ee.Ma.Yau. and Jallikattu respectively. He also received the Silver Crow Pheasant Award at the International Film Festival of Kerala 2018.

Pellissery made his debut in 2010 with the crime film Nayakan and followed it up with the crime-drama City of God (2011) and the black comedy satire Amen (2013), the last mentioned, a commercial success at the Kerala box office. His fourth film, Double Barrel, an experimental film received only mixed reviews. His fifth film was again a crime-gangster film Angamaly Diaries (2017), starring almost 90 new actors, which preceded Ee.Ma.Yau., released in 2018. His movie Jallikkattu premiered at the Toronto International Film Festival. In 2020, Jallikkattu was selected as India's official entry for Best International Feature Film at the 93rd Academy Awards.

== Early life ==
Pellissery was born on 18 September 1978 in Chalakudy in Thrissur district of the south Indian state of Kerala to Lilly and Jose Pellissery, a known film and theatre actor and a winner of a state award for best stage actor. His schooling was at Carmel Higher Secondary School, Chalakudy and after graduating from the Union Christian College, Aluva, he earned a master's degree in business administration from the Indian Institute of Plantation Management, Bangalore.

== Career ==
By the time Lijo Pellissery was born, Jose Pellissery who co-owned a theatre group by Sarathy Theatres, was active in Malayalam films and this gave the young Lijo an early grounding in films. His career started as an assistant to Manoj Pillai, an ad filmmaker, and Pellissery soon started making short films of his own. One of his films, 3, was one of three films shortlisted for the best film award at the PIX Short Film Festival 2007. He debuted as a feature film director in 2010 with Nayakan, which narrated the story of a Kathakali artist who joined the underworld to take revenge on those who killed his family. Though the film was critically acclaimed, it failed at the box office. His next venture, City of God, one of the early New Generation films of Malayalam cinema and a multi-starrer featuring Indrajith Sukumaran, Prithviraj Sukumaran, Parvathy, Swetha Menon and Rima Kallingal used hyperlink cinema as its narrative structure and was a critical success but, again failed miserably at the box office; it was pulled from cinemas just days after its release.

It took another two years before he came up with his third movie, Amen, in 2013, which had Indrajith Sukumaran, Fahad Fasil, Swathi Reddy and Kalabhavan Mani in the lead roles and the movie succeeded at the box office while drawing good critical response. After a gap of almost two years, Pellissery released his fourth film, Double Barrel, a comic thriller, with Prithviraj Sukumaran, Indrajith Sukumaran, Arya, Sunny Wayne and Asif Ali in the lead roles. However, the film did not succeed critically or commercially. The next project, Angamaly Diaries, a black comedy cloaked in a gangster plot that revolves around the locale of Angamaly, was scripted by popular actor, Chemban Vinod Jose. The film, made on a small budget of ₹30 million, was received well at the box office and drew critical acclaim; Anurag Kashyap opined that Angamaly Diaries was his film of the year. Ee.Ma.Yau., his next film based on a satire written by P. F. Mathews and with his regular composer, Prashant Pillai, scoring the music, was premiered on 30 November 2017 but the release was delayed due to undisclosed reasons. Before it was released on 4 May 2018, the film received the Kerala State Film Award for Best Director at the 48th Kerala State Film Awards. The film also won him the Silver Peacock Award for the best director at the 49th International Film Festival of India (IFFI), 2018, which was held in Goa in November 2018 (Chemban Vinod Jose, the protagonist of the film, also received the Silver Peacock Award for the best actor.) followed by the Sinema Zetu International Film Festival Award for Best Direction.

== Filmmaking style ==
Pellissery often uses non-linear style of narrative and long takes. His early films had established actors in the lead roles but, Angamaly Diaries marked a change where almost the entire cast were newcomers with 86 new actors making their debut, and subsequently accomplishing a triumph in the form of a 11-minute uninterrupted long take in the climax. Following the similar technique, Jallikattu has at least 6 long takes and have brought in over thousand extras for the climax sequence.

== Filmography ==
List of Lijo Jose Pellissery film credits
Year	Title	Credited as			Notes
Year	Title	Director	Producer	Acting Roles	Notes
2010	Nayakan	Yes	No	Stevenson	
2011	City of God	Yes	No	No	
2011	Bombay March 12	No	No	Terrorist	
2013	Amen	Yes	No	No	
2014	Sapthamashree Thaskaraha	No	No	Priest	
2014	Oru Korean Padam	No	No		
2015	Double Barrel	Yes	Co-producer	No	Co-produced with August Cinema; Also writer
2016	Aakashvani	No	No	Thomas Kuruvila	
2016	Darvinte Parinamam	No	No	Himself	
2017	Angamaly Diaries	Yes	No	No	
2017	Oru Cinemakkaran	No	No	Himself	
2017	Mayaanadhi	No	No	Director Len Prasad	
2018	Ee.Ma.Yau.	Yes	No	No	
2018	Swathanthryam Ardharathriyil	No	Co-producer	Lawyer Tony Mattathil	Co-produced with BC Joshi and Chemban Vinod Jose
2018	Padayottam	No	No	Gangster Britto	
2019	Jallikkattu	Yes	Co-producer	No	Co-produced with O.Thomas Panicker and Chemban Vinod Jose
2019	Thamaasha	No	Co-producer	No	Co-produced with Sameer Thahir, Shyju Khalid and Chemban Vinod Jose
2021	Churuli	Yes	Co-producer	No	Co-produced with O.Thomas Panicker and Chemban Vinod Jose
2023	Nanpakal Nerathu Mayakkam	Yes	Co-producer	No	Co-produced with Mammootty
2024	Malaikottai Vaaliban	Yes	Co-producer	No	
2025	Painkili	No	No	Thanku	

== Accolades ==
List of Lijo Jose Pellissery awards
Year	Category	Award	Work	Result	Ref.
2013	Best Director	Asianet Film Awards	Amen	Won	
2017	Kerala State Film Award for Best Director	48th Kerala State Film Awards	Ee.Ma.Yau.	Won	
2017	Best Director	Cinema Paradiso Club Award	Angamaly Diaries	Won	
2018	Silver Peacock Award for Best Director	49th International Film Festival of India	Ee.Ma.Yau.	Won	
2018	Silver Crow Pheasant Award for the Best Director	International Film Festival of Kerala	Ee.Ma.Yau.	Won	
2018	Filmfare Award for Best Director – Malayalam	Filmfare Awards South	Ee.Ma.Yau.	Won	
2019	Silver Peacock Award for Best Director	50th International Film Festival of India	Jallikattu	Won	
2019	Best Director (special mention)	International Film Festival of Kerala	Jallikattu	Won	
2019	Best Director	Sinema Zetu International Film Festival Award SZIFF	Ee.Ma.Yau.	Won	
2019	Kerala State Film Award for Best Director	50th Kerala State Film Awards	Jallikattu	Won	
2020	Audience Poll Award (Silver Peacock)	25th International Film Festival of Kerala	Churuli	Won	
2020	Special Mention for Best Direction	25th International Film Festival of Kerala	Churuli	Won	
2023	Kerala State Film Award for Best Film	53rd Kerala State Film Awards	Nanpakal Nerathu Mayakkam	Won	
