= Kerala State Film Award for Best Book on Cinema =

Annual Indian film award

- State award for contributions to Malayalam cinema
- Awarded for: Best book on Malayalam cinema
- Sponsored by: Kerala State Chalachitra Academy
- Reward: ₹30,000 (US$320)
- First award: 1984
- Final award: 2024
- Most recent winner: C. S. Meenakshi
- Website: keralafilm.com

The Kerala State Film Award for Best Book on Cinema is presented annually at the Kerala State Film Awards of India to the author whose book is adjudged to be the best book on Malayalam cinema. The awards are managed directly by the Kerala State Chalachitra Academy under the Department of Cultural Affairs of the Government of Kerala.

== Winners ==
Year	Author	Book	Ref.
1984	Manarkkad Mathew	Chalathithraswaroopam	
1984	Vijayakrishnan	Chalathithrathinte Porul	
1985	Kallikkadu Ramachandran	Lokacinema Oru Mukhadarshanam	
1985	Vijayakrishnan	Maarunna Prathichayakal	
1986	Mankada Ravi Varma	Chithram Chalachithram	
1986	Vijayakrishnan	Karuppum Veluppum Varnangalum	
1987	V. Rajakrishnan	Kazhchayude Asanthi	
1988	Kozhikkodan	Chalathitraswadanam Engane?	
1989	Dr. Aravindan Vallachira	Chalachithravum Samoohavum	
1990	Ravindran	Cinemayude Rashtreeyam	
1991	Vijayakrishnan	Kalathil Kothiya Silpangal	
1992	Dr. Aravindan Vallachira	Chalachitra Prasthangal	
1994	K. Vellappan	Cinemayum Samoohavum	
1995	Salam Karasseri	Cinemalochana	
1996	I. Shanmughadas	Sanchaariyude Veedu	
1997	V. K. Joseph	Cinemayum Prathaiyayasasthravum	
1998	G. P. Ramachandran	Cinemayum Malayaliyude Jeevithavum	
1999	Eravankara	Malayala Cinemayum Sahityavum	
2000	John Paul	M. T.: Oranuyatra	
2001	Sudha Warrier	Anukalpanathintae Attaprakaram	
2002	C. V. Balakrishnan	Cinemayude Idangal	
2003	Rajan P Thodiyoor	Nizhal Chitrangalude Porul	
2004	Adoor Gopalakrishnan	Cinemanubhavam	
2005	K. Gopinathan	Cinemayum Samskaravum	
2006	M. F. Thomas	Adoorinte Chalachitra Yatrakal	
2006	P. G. Sadanandan	Cinemayude Neethisaram	
2007	N. P. Sajeesh	Shalaba Chirakukal Kozhiyunna Charithra Shishirathil	
2008	A. Chandrasekhar	Bodhatheerangalil Kalam Midikkumbol	
2009	G. P. Ramachandran	Malayala Cinema: Desam, Bhasha, Samskaram	
2010	Jose K. Manual	Thirakkadha Sahithyam: Soundaryavum Prasakthiyum	
2010	P. S. Radhakrishnan	Charithravum Chalachithravum: Desiya Bhavanayude Harsha Moolyangal	
2011	G. P. Ramachandran	Loka Cinema Kazhchayum Sthalakaalangalum	
2012	K. Gopinathan	Cinemayude Nottangal	
2013	S. Jayachandran Nair	Kazhchayude Sathyam	
2013	Vijayakrishnan	Indian Cinemayude 100 Varshangal	
2014	V K joseph	Athijeevanathinte Chalachithra Bhashyangal	
2015	K. B. Venu	K. G. Georgente Chalachithra Yathrakal	
2016	Aju K. Narayanan, Cherry Jacob	Cinema Muthal Cinema Vare	
2017	V. Mohanakrishnan	Cinema Kanum Deshangal	
2018	M. Jayaraj	Malayala Cinema Pinnitta Vazhikal	
2019	P. K. Rajasekharan	Cinema Sandarbhangal: Cinema Shaalayum Keraleeya Pothumandalavum	
2020	P. K. Surendran	Aakyanathinte Piriyan Kovanikal	
2021	Pattanam Rasheed	Chamayam	
2022	C. S. Venkiteswaran	Cinemayude Bhavanadeshangal	
2023	Kishore Kumar	Mazhavilkanniloode Malayala Cinema	
2024	C. S. Meenakshi	Pennpaattu Tharakal	

== See also ==
- Kerala State Film Award for Best Article on Cinema
