= G. Marthandan =

Indian film director

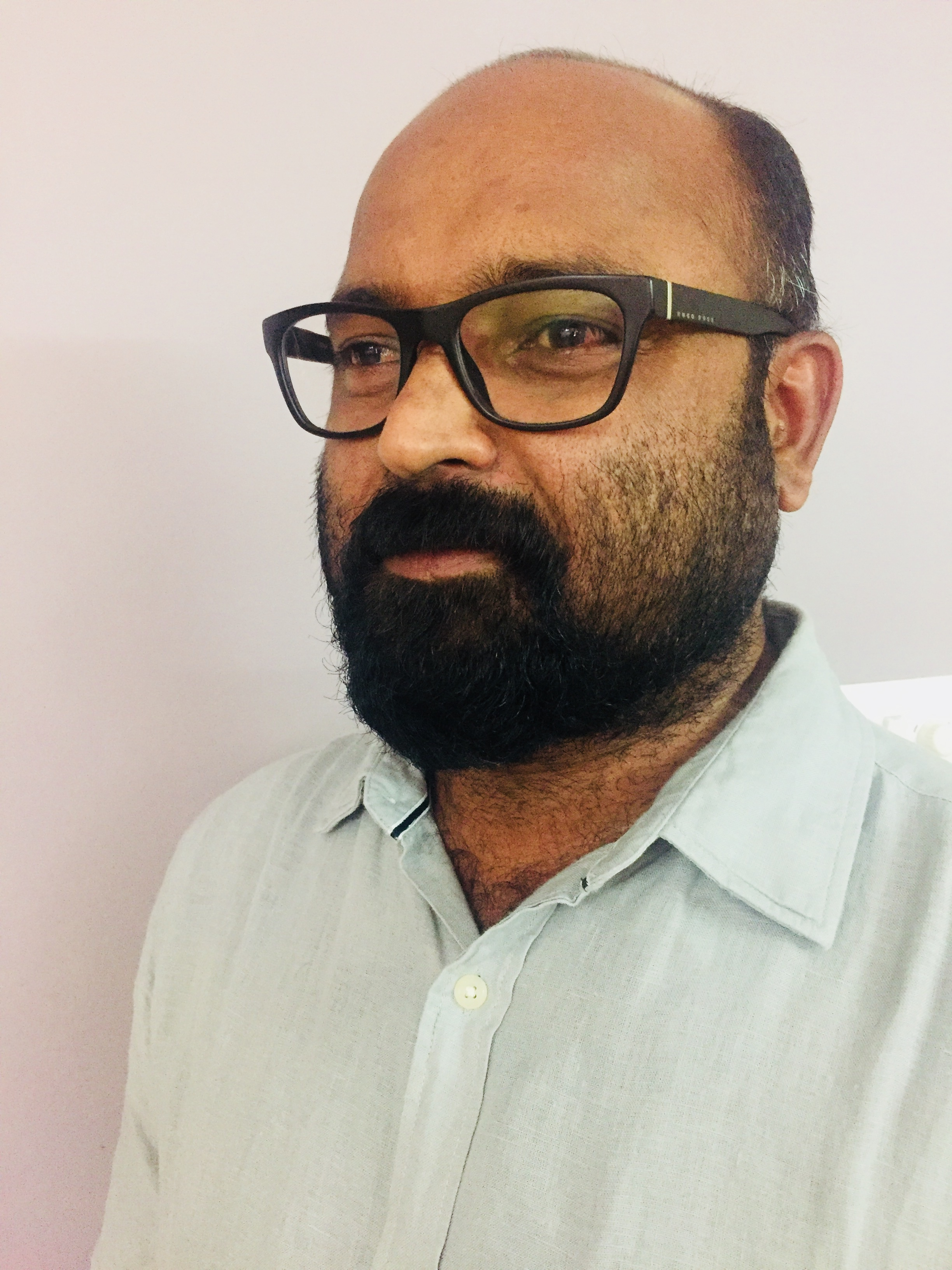
- Born: Suresh Kumar G 18 July; Changanassery, Kerala, India
- Education: Bachelor's Degree in Economics
- Alma mater: NSS Hindu College, Changanassery
- Occupation: Film director
- Years active: 1995–present
- Parents: M. S. Gopalan Nair (father); P. Kamalamma (mother)

Gopalan Marthandan is an Indian film director who works in Malayalam cinema. His debut film is Daivathinte Swantham Cleetus.

== Early life ==
G. Marthandan was born to M. S. Gopalan Nair and P. Kamalamma at Changanassery in Kottayam district of Kerala. He did his schooling at NSS Boys School Changanassery and completed his bachelor's degree in Economics at NSS Hindu College, Changanassery.

== Career ==
After completing his bachelor's degree, Marthandan entered films as an associate director with the unreleased film Swarnachamaram directed by Rajeevnath in 1995. His next work was British Market, directed by Nissar in 1998. He worked as an associate director for 18 years.

He made his directional debut with Daivathinte Swantham Cleetus in 2013, starring Mammooty in the lead role. His next movie was in 2015, Acha Dhin, with Mammooty and Mansi Sharma in the lead roles. Daivathinte Swantham Cleetus and Paavada were box office successes.

== Filmography ==
=== As director ===
Year	Title	Cast	Script writer
2013	Daivathinte Swantham Cleetus	Mammootty, Siddique, Honey Rose	Benny P Nayarambalam
2015	Acha Dhin	Mammootty, Mansi Sharma, Maniyanpilla Raju	Vijeesh A.C
2016	Paavada	Prithviraj Sukumaran, Anoop Menon, Asha Sarath	Bipin Chandran
2018	Johny Johny Yes Appa	Kunchacko Boban, Anu Sithara, Vijayaraghavan, Sanoop Santhosh	Joji Thomas
2023	Maharani	Roshan Mathew, Shine Tom Chacko	Ratheesh Ravi
2026	Ottam Thullal †	Vijayaraghavan, Vishnu Unnikrishnan, Kalabhavan Shajon, Harisree Ashokan	Binu Sasiram

=== As associate director ===
Year	Title	Director	Cast
1996	Swarnachamaram	Rajeevnath	Mohanlal, Sivaji Ganesan, Ranjitha
1998	British Market	Nissar	Vijayaraghavan, Jagathy Sreekumar, Anju Aravind
2007	Chotta Mumbai	Anwar Rasheed	Mohanlal, Kalabhavan Mani, Siddique, Bhavana
2007	Kichamani MBA	Samad Mankada	Suresh Gopi, Biju Menon , Navya Nair
2008	Annan Thambi	Anwar Rasheed	Mammootty, Lakshmi Rai, Gopika
2008	Roudram	Renji Panicker	Mammootty, Sai Kumar, Vijayaraghavan
2008	Mayabazar	Thomas Sebastian	Mammootty, Sheela Kaur, Kalabhavan Mani
2009	2 Harihar Nagar	Lal	Mukesh, Jagadish, Siddique, Lakshmi Rai
2009	Chattambinadu	Shafi	Mammootty, Lakshmi Rai, Siddique
2010	Pranchiyettan & the Saint	Ranjith	Mammootty, Priyamani, Innocent
2010	Best Actor	Martin Prakkat	Mammootty, Sonu Gowda, Lal
2010	Tournament	Lal	Fahadh Faasil, Praveen Prem, Rupa Manjari
2010	Oru Naal Varum	T. K. Rajeev Kumar	Mohanlal, Sreenivasan, Sameera Reddy
2012	The King & the Commissioner	Shaji Kailas	Mammootty, Suresh Gopi
2012	Simhasanam	Shaji Kailas	Prithviraj, Vandana Menon, Aishwarya Devan

=== As actor ===
Year	Film	Role	Notes
2019	Allu Ramendran	AR Rahman Ikka	

TV serial

- Kanyadanam (Malayalam TV series) - pilot episode

== Awards ==
- Ramu Kariat Film Award - Paavada (2016)
- JCI Foundation Award - Daivathinte Swantham Cleetus (2013)
