= Pombalai Orumai =

- Directed by: Vipin Atley
- Written by: Vipin Atley; Jini K.
- Production company: Macrom Studios
- Distributed by: Saina Play
- Release date: 2024
- Country: India
- Language: Malayalam

Pombalai Orumai is an Indian Malayalam film written and directed by Vipin Atley featuring Sreeshma Chandran, Jitheesh Parameshwar, Twinkle Joby ,Shilpa Anil and Vipin Atley in lead roles.

== Accolades ==
Year	Award	Category	Recipient	Result	Notes	Ref.
2024	Kerala State Film Awards	Best Character Actress	Sreeshma Chandran	Won	Received ₹50,000 cash price	
2024	Poovachal Khader Film-Television-Media Award 2024	Best Actress in Negative role	Twinkle Joby	Won		
