= Under World =

2019 film by Arun Kumar Aravind

- Theatrical release poster
- Directed by: Arun Kumar Aravind
- Written by: Shibin Francis
- Produced by: D14 Entertainments; Ali Ashiq
- Starring: Asif Ali; Samyuktha; Farhaan Faasil; Mukesh; Jean Paul Lal
- Cinematography: Alex J. Pulickal
- Edited by: Ceejay Achu; Arun Kumar
- Music by: Neha Nair; Yakzan Gary Pereira
- Production company: D14 Entertainments
- Distributed by: Friday Film House
- Release date: 1 November 2019 (India)
- Running time: 160 minutes
- Country: India
- Language: Malayalam

Under World is a 2019 Indian Malayalam-language gangster film directed by Arun Kumar Aravind, written by Shibin Francis, and starring Asif Ali, Samyuktha, Farhaan Faasil, Mukesh, and Jean Paul Lal in the lead roles. The film was released on 1 November 2019 and received mixed reviews from both the audience and critics. It failed commercially at the box office

== Premise ==
Stalin and Majeed are two young gangsters in Kerala's underworld who want to earn quick money through any means. However, things take a turn when they cross paths with Padmanabhan and Solomon.

== Cast ==
- Asif Ali as Stalin John
- Farhaan Faasil as Majeed
- Mukesh as Padhmanabhan Nair
- Samyuktha as Aishwarya
- Jean Paul Lal as Solomon
- Nishanth Sagar as Mani
- Srikant Murali as Potti
- Meghanathan as Shahul Hameed
- Arun Cherukavil as Sadasivan
- Muthumani as Adv. M. Padmavathi
- Sreelakshmi as Stalin's mother
- Amalda Liz as Annie
- Shivan V. Arun as Younger Farhaan
- Bipin Chandran as Rajan Mulankadu
- James Eliya as Mujeeb
- John Vijay as Mohammed Sanafar
- Alex J. Pulickal as Suhas
- Vijayan as S I Prathapan
- Kalabhavan Haneef as Barber
- Pauly Valsan as Nurse
- Arjun Ashokan as Frog catcher (cameo)
- Ganapathi S Poduval as Frog watcher (cameo)
- Balu Varghese as Frog catcher (cameo)

== Reception ==
=== Critical response ===
The Times of India gave the film three out of five stars and wrote that "The Arun Kumar Aravind directorial, written by Shibin Francis, aptly fits into the genre of gang war movies and crime drama". On the contrary, The Hindu stated that "Riding high on its style quotient, accentuated by an effective background score, Underworld does not have the substance to make it a memorable take on the world of crime."
