= 54th Kerala State Film Awards =

State awards for Malayalam films of 2023

- Awarded for: Best works in Malayalam cinema in a selected year
- Date: 16 August 2024
- Location: Thiruvananthapuram
- Country: India
- Presented by: Kerala State Chalachitra Academy
- First award: 1969

Highlights
- Most wins: Aadujeevitham
- Website: keralafilm.com

The 54th Kerala State Film Awards, presented by the Kerala State Chalachitra Academy, was announced by Saji Cherian, the Minister of Cultural Affairs, Kerala, on 16 August 2024. A total of 160 films were submitted for the awards. A jury headed by Sudhir Mishra decided the awards for the film category and a jury headed by Janaki Sreedharan decided awards for the writing category.

== Writing category ==
=== Jury ===
• Janaki Sreedharan (chairman)
• Jose K. Manuel	• O. K. Santosh
• C. Ajoy

=== Awards ===
All award recipients receive a cash prize, certificate and statuette.

Name of award	Title of work	Awardee(s)	Cash prize
Best Book on Cinema	Mazhavilkannilode Malayala Cinema	Kishore Kumar	₹30,000
Best Article on Cinema	Desheeyatheya Azhichedukkunna Cinema	Rakesh M. R.	₹20,000

=== Special Mention ===
All recipients receive a certificate and statuette.

Name of award	Title	Awardee(s)
Book on Cinema	Kamanagalude Samskariga Spandangal	P Premachandran
Article on Cinema	No Award	No Award

== Film category ==
=== Jury ===
Final jury
• Sudhir Mishra (chairman)
• Priyanandanan	• Alagappan N.
• Lijo Jose Pellissery	• N. S. Madhavan
• Ann Augustine	• Sreevalsan J. Menon
• C. Ajoy

Second jury
• Priyanandanan (chairman)
• B. Rakesh	• Sajas Rahman
• Vinod Sukumaran	• C. Ajoy

First jury
• Alagappan N. (chairman)
• V. J. James	• K. M. Sheeba
• Roy P. Thomas	• C. Ajoy

=== Awards ===
All award recipients receive a cash prize, certificate and statuette.

Name of award	Title of film	Awardee(s)	Cash prize
Best Film	Kaathal – The Core	Director: Jeo Baby	₹200,000
Best Film	Kaathal – The Core	Producer: Mammootty	₹200,000
Second Best Film	Iratta	Director: Rohit M. G. Krishnan	₹150,000
Second Best Film	Iratta	Producer: Joju George; Martin Prakkat; Sijo Vakkan	₹150,000
Best Director	Aadujeevitham	Blessy	₹200,000
Best Actor	Aadujeevitham	Prithviraj Sukumaran	₹100,000
Best Actress	Ullozhukku	Urvashi	₹100,000
Best Actress	Thadavu	Beena R. Chandran	₹100,000
Best Character Actor	Pookkaalam	Vijayaraghavan	₹50,000
Best Character Actress	Pombalai Orumai	Sreeshma Chandran	₹50,000
Best Child Artist	Pachuvum Athbutha Vilakkum	Avyukth Menon (Male category)	₹50,000
Best Child Artist	Sesham Mike-il Fathima	Thennal Abhilash (Female category)	₹50,000
Best Story	Kaathal – The Core	Adarsh Sukumaran; Paulson Skaria	₹50,000
Best Cinematography	Aadujeevitham	Sunil K. S.	₹25,000
Best Screenplay (Original)	Iratta	Rohit M. G. Krishnan	₹50,000
Best Screenplay (Adaptation)	Aadujeevitham	Blessy	₹50,000
Best Lyrics	Chaaver ("Chenthamara Poovil")	Hareesh Mohanan	₹50,000
Best Music Director (songs)	Chaaver ("Chenthamara Poovil)	Justin Varghese	₹50,000
Best Music Director (score)	Kaathal – The Core	Mathews Pulickan	₹50,000
Best Male Singer	Jananam 1947 Pranayam Thydaunnu ("Kanave Mizhiyil Unare")	Vidyadharan	₹50,000
Best Female Singer	Pachuvum Athbutha Vilakkum ("Thinkal Poovin")	Anne Amie	₹50,000
Best Editor	Little Miss Rawther	Sangeeth Prathap	₹50,000
Best Art Director	2018 : Everyone is a Hero	Mohandas	₹50,000
Best Sync Sound	O. Baby	Shameer Ahamed	₹50,000
Best Sound Mixing	Aadujeevitham	Resul Pookutty; Sarath Mohan	₹50,000
Best Sound Design	Ullozhukku	Jayadevan Chakkadath; Anil Radhakrishnan	₹50,000
Best Processing Lab / Colourist	Aadujeevitham	Vaishal Shiva Ganesh	₹25,000
Best Makeup Artist	Aadujeevitham	Ranjith Ambadi	₹50,000
Best Costume Designer	O. Baby	Femina Jebbar	₹50,000
Best Dubbing Artist	Ullozhukku(Character: Rajeev); Valatty(Character: Tommy)	Roshan Mathew (Male category)	₹50,000
Best Dubbing Artist	Jananam 1947 Pranayam Thydaunnu (Character: )	Sumangala (Female category)	₹50,000
Best Choreography	Sulaikha Manzil	Jishnu	₹50,000
Best Film with Popular Appeal and Aesthetic Value	Aadujeevitham	Director: Blessy	₹100,000
Best Film with Popular Appeal and Aesthetic Value	Aadujeevitham	Producer: Visual Romance	₹100,000
Best Debut Director	Thadavu	Fasil Razak	₹100,000
Best Children's Film	No Award		
Best Visual Effects	2018 : Everyone is a Hero	Andrew D Cruz; Vishak Babu	₹50,000

=== Special Mention ===
All recipients receive a certificate and statuette.

Name of award	Title of film	Awardee(s)	Awarded for
Special Mention	Aadujeevitham	K. R. Gokul	Acting
Special Mention	Kaathal – The Core	Sudhi Kozhikode	Acting
Special Mention	Jaivam	Krishnan	Acting
Special Mention	Gaganachari	Arun Chandu	Direction

=== Special Award in Any Category for Women/Transgender ===
All recipients receive a cash prize, certificate, and statuette.

Name of award	Title of film	Awardee(s)	Awarded for	Cash prize
Special Award in Any Category for Women/Transgender	Ennennum	Shalini Ushadevi	Direction	₹50,000
