= Kerala State Film Award for Best Article on Cinema =

Annual Indian film award

- State award for contributions to Malayalam cinema
- Awarded for: Best article on Malayalam cinema
- Sponsored by: Kerala State Chalachitra Academy
- Reward: ₹20,000 (US$210)
- First award: 1998
- Final award: 2024
- Most recent winner: Valsalan Vathussery
- Website: keralafilm.com

The Kerala State Film Award for Best Article on Cinema is presented annually at the Kerala State Film Awards of India to the author of the best article on Malayalam cinema. The awards are managed directly by the Kerala State Chalachitra Academy under the Department of Cultural Affairs of the Government of Kerala.

== Winners ==
Year	Author	Article	Ref.
1998	Geetha	Innathe Malayalam Cinema	
1999	E. A. Ashraf	Malayalam Cinema Charithravum Charithra Rahithyavum	
2000	M. G. Radhakrishnan	Idiliyum Fasisavum	
2002	Sudheer Parameswaran	Sthreekathapathrangal Televisionilum Cinemayilum	
2003	C. S. Venkiteswaran	Mammootty Enna Tharam	
2004	Vijayakrishnan	Classicugal Komali Nadakangal Avunathu	
2006	N. P. Sajeesh	What Malayalam Cinema Says To Muslims After the Gujarat Genocide.	
2007	K.P.Jayakumar	Kanathaya Purushan Kazchapedunna Cinema	
2008	P. S. Radhakrishnan	Vadakkanpattu Cinemakal	
2009	P. S. Radhakrishnan; K. P. Jayakumar	Chemmeen: Deshabhavayude Ethirolikal; Apaharikkapedunna Kalapangal	
2010	Sujith Kumar; Dr. Biju	Nostalgia Nirmikunnath; Kollaruth Samvidhayakare	
2011	Neelan	Elipathayam: Eli Purathum Akathum	
2012	Aju K. Narayanan, Cheri Jacob K.	Nirangalude Soundarya Rashtreeyangal	
2013	S. Jayachandran Nair	Kazhchayude Sathyam	
2014	I. Shanmughadas; V. Vijayakumar	Daivanarthakante Krodham; Charithrathe Chalachithramakkiya Master	
2015	Aju K. Narayanan	Silver Screenile Ethirnottangal	
2016	N. P. Sajeesh	Velutha Thirasheelayude Karutha Udalukal	
2017	A. Chandrasekhar	Realisathinte Yadharthyangal	
2018	Blais Johny	Vellithirayile 'Avarum Nammalum' Thammilendhu?	
2019	Bipin Chandran	Madamballiyile Manorogi; Komali Melkkai Nedunna Kalam	
2020	John Samuel	Adoorinte 5 Nayaka Kathapathrangal	
2021	Jithin K. C.	Malayala Cinemayile Aanoruthanmar	
2022	Sabu Pravadas	Punasthapanam Enna Mahendrajalam	
2023	Rakesh M. R.	Desheeyathaye Azhichedukkunna Cinema	
2024	Valsalan Vathussery	Marayunna Naalukettukal	

== See also ==
- Kerala State Film Award for Best Book on Cinema
