= Padayaatra =

2026 Indian film

- Directed by: Adoor Gopalakrishnan
- Written by: K. V. Mohan Kumar; Adoor Gopalakrishnan
- Produced by: Mammootty, George Sebastian (executive producer)
- Starring: Mammootty; Grace Antony; Indrans
- Cinematography: Shehnad Jalal
- Edited by: Praveen Prabhakar
- Music by: Mujeeb Majeed
- Production company: Mammootty Kampany
- Distributed by: Wayfarer films
- Country: India
- Language: Malayalam

Padayaatra is an upcoming Indian Malayalam language period drama film directed by Adoor Gopalakrishnan and starring Mammootty, Indrans and Grace Antony in lead roles.

== Development ==
Story, screenplay, and dialogues of the film are by Gopalakrishnan and K. V. Mohan Kumar. Novelist and retired civil servant K.V. Mohan Kumar states that he wrote the initial draft of the story drawing inspiration from the memoirs of G. N. Saibaba, a Delhi University professor and person with physical disabilities, who was arrested on allegations of having Maoist links, but notes that Adoor Gopalakrishnan introduced significant changes to the story to imbue it with a powerful visual experience and thematic depth.

The film is directed by Adoor Gopalakrishnan. It marks the fourth collaboration between Gopalakrishnan and Mammootty, following Anantaram (1987), Mathilukal (1989) and Vidheyan (1994). The film is being produced by Mammootty himself under the banner of Mammootty Company. The film is being distributed by Wayfarer films by Dulquer Salman.

The principal photography began on 23 January 2026 and was completed on 4 March 2026, after a 40-day schedule in Kerala.

== Plot ==
The film tells the story of Devadas, who was born into a poor family der the care of his widowed mother, eventually becoming a doctor. Devadas, a follower of Gandhian ideology and committed to integrity and honesty in both his professional and personal life, leaves his career in the urban city and move to a remote, tribal-inhabited hilly region in Wayanad.

The doctor's presence proves to be a boon to the local Adivasi community, who otherwise have to travel to a distant town even in medical emergencies. He does not charge for his services, instead placing a box outside his consulting room for voluntary contributions.

The doctor's growing popularity among the local population, however, displeases both the area's MLA and the landlord who provided the land for his hospital and residence. The film's narrative unfolds through the events that follow when the Maoists in the region attack the landlord's house, and individuals with vested interests attempt to implicate the doctor in the incident and have him arrested.

Mammootty plays the lead character, Dr. Devdas, while Indrans plays his assistant, a medical assistant, and Grace Antony plays the role of a nurse. Alencier Ley Lopez plays the role of the police officer. Sreekumar plays the landlord, theatre artist Gopalakrishnan his assistant, Ajit Kumar an aide to the local MLA, Professor Aliyar an Adivasi teacher who supports Dr. Devadas, and Njavarakkal Rajan a Maoist, while Naz, a trained Belgian Malinois, appears as the landlord's pet dog.

== Cast ==
- Mammootty
- Indrans
- Grace Antony
- Alencier Ley Lopez
- Sreeshma Chandran
- Madhupal
- Nandu
- Aliyar
- Jagadish
- Sudheer Karamana
- Santhosh Keezhattoor
- P. Sreekumar
- Vijayaraghavan
- Zeenath

== Release ==
An earlier report in April 2026 stated that the film was expected to premiere at international film festivals before being released directly on an OTT platform, rather than receiving a conventional theatrical release. The makers had not officially confirmed the reported plan at the time. The film received a U/A 13+ certificate from the Central Board of Film Certification (CBFC) in June 2026. The film's trailer was released on 13 September 2026. It is scheduled for theatrical release on 4 December 2026.

== Awards and honours ==
'Padayaatra' has been selected to the international competition section of the 31st International Film Festival of Kerala.
