= I, Nobody =

2026 Indian film by Nissam Basheer

- Theatrical release poster
- Directed by: Nissam Basheer
- Written by: Sameer Abdul
- Produced by: Supriya Menon; Mukesh R. Mehta; C. V. Sarathi
- Starring: Prithviraj Sukumaran
- Cinematography: Dinesh Purushothaman
- Edited by: Ramees M. B.
- Music by: Jakes Bejoy
- Production companies: Prithviraj Productions; E4 Entertainment
- Release date: 9 July 2026
- Running time: 168 minutes
- Country: India
- Language: Malayalam
- Box office: ₹15.5 crore

I, Nobody is a 2026 Indian Malayalam-language heist action thriller film directed by Nissam Basheer and written by Sameer Abdul. The film is produced by Supriya Menon, Mukesh R. Mehta and C. V. Sarathi, under Prithviraj Productions and E4 Entertainment. The film stars Prithviraj Sukumaran and Parvathy Thiruvothu in the lead roles. The film released in theaters worldwide on 9 July 2026.

This movie released worldwide on 9 July 2026 to mixed reviews.

== Plot ==
Rajeevan is a middle-class government employee living with his wife Meera and their two daughters, Jia and Amala. The couple's marriage is already under severe strain because of unresolved personal conflicts.

One day, Rajeevan is unexpectedly trapped inside the ISFC Bank's Vanchiyoor branch during a robbery in which nearly ₹17 crore is stolen. Due to circumstances that are initially unexplained, he is forced to accompany the robbers and soon becomes the prime suspect in the crime after the robbers are killed in a car accident. Both the police and the criminal gang begin hunting him, believing he knows what happened to the missing money.

As the investigation intensifies, Rajeevan is interrogated, assaulted, and pursued from all sides. His already fragile family life deteriorates further. Meera loses faith in him and serves him with divorce papers while attempting to protect their daughters from the growing danger.

The conflict escalates when their daughter Jia is kidnapped, drawing the attention of the state's political leadership. At one stage, even the Chief Minister becomes involved in the case because of its wider implications.

In the end, it is shown that Rajeevan, with the help of Jacob, had already located both his daughter and the stolen money, and kept both safe and secure.

== Cast ==
- Prithviraj Sukumaran as Rajeevan
- Parvathy Thiruvothu as Meera, Rajeevan's wife
- Ashokan as Jacob
- Hakim Shahjahan as CPO Anas Rahman
- Vijayaraghavan as Chief Minister Karthikeyan
- Shankar Ramakrishnan as SP Ajith IPS
- Madhupal as CI Jomon
- Nakshatra C M as Jiya, Rajeevan's elder daughter
- Ayra Izra as Amala, Rajeevan's younger daughter
- Nishanth Sagar as Anas's brother-in-law
- Nandu as Rajendran, politician and CM's aide
- Irshad Ali as DGP Ajmal Ali IPS
- Manoj K. U. as Opposition Leader
- Jijoy Rajagopal as Palanadan, Malayali channel YouTuber
- Sudhi Koppa as Alex, bank robber
- Sanju Sivram as Peter, bank robber
- Khalid Rahman as Koshy, bank robber
- Rony David as Branch Manager, ISFC Bank, Vanchiyoor Branch
- Beena R. Chandran as Jacob's wife
- Sana Althaf as Nisha, Anas's wife
- Krishnan Balakrishnan as one of the bank robber's brother-in-law
- Dinesh Alappuzha
- Noushad Ali as Hameed, Anas's brother-in-law
- Sudhi Kozhikode
- Mahendran
- Albin Alex as one of the public goons
- Jithin Madanan
- Lenna Paul

== Production ==
=== Development ===
The film was announced on 27 August 2024 through an Instagram post of official film page. The Pooja ceremony was held on 9 April 2025. The film's first look poster was released on 23 August 2025.

=== Filming ===
Principal photography took place at Willingdon Island and major locations at Kochi and Thiruvananthapuram.

== Soundtrack ==
I, Nobody

Soundtrack album by Jakes Bejoy
- Released: 10 July 2026
- Studios: Mindscore Studio, Cochin; MLounge, Cochin; Pop Media House, Cochin; The Sanctuary Audio Visual Studio, Mumbai
- Genre: Feature film soundtrack
- Length: 34:05
- Language: Malayalam
- Label: Sony Music
- Producer: Jakes Bejoy

Jakes Bejoy chronology
Mollywood Times (2026)	I, Nobody (2026)	Thudakkam (2026)
External audio
- I, Nobody - Audio Jukebox on YouTube

Singles from I, Nobody
- 1. "Sajje Khabbe (Anthem Of Nobody)" Released: 24 June 2026; 2. "Sajje Khabbe (Female Version)" Released: 27 June 2026; 3. "Raavu Thaandi" Released: 3 July 2026

Track listing
No.	Title	Lyrics	Singer(s)	Length
1.	"Sajje Khabbe (Anthem of Nobody)"	Siddhant Kaushal	Sudhir Yaduvanshi, BJorn Surroa, Simiran Kaur Dhadli	4:02
2.	"Raavu Thaandi"	Anwar Ali	Sithara Krishnakumar	4:37
3.	"Circus"	Zeba Tommy	Alankrita Menon Prithviraj	3:33
4.	"I'm A Nobody"	Zeba Tommy, Gabri	Jakes Bejoy, Zeba Tommy, Gabri	3:42
5.	"Jaadui Subah"	Siddhant Kaushal	Gini	3:27
6.	"Mele Mele"	Suhail Koya	Usha Uthup	4:55
7.	"Creepy Eyes"	Siddhant Kaushal	Charan, Kalpana Gandharva	1:55
8.	"Dhoonde"	Anohnymouss	Anohnymouss	3:48
9.	"Sajje Khabbe (Female Version)"	Siddhant Kaushal	Simiran Kaur Dhadli, Bjorn Surrao	4:06
Total length:				34:05

== Release ==
The film released in theaters worldwide on 9 July 2026.

=== Home media ===
The film’s digital rights have been acquired by JioHotstar and begun streaming from 25 August 2026.

== Reception ==
I,Nobody has received mixed reviews.Reviewers praised the film for thriller elements,action sequences however the film was criticised for its final act.

Aswin Bharadwaj of Lensmen Reviews said that "Nisam Basheer’s Genre-Blending Thriller Is Fabulous and Flawed in Equal Parts"

Janani K of India Today said that "I, Nobody overstays its welcome, and that keeps it from the greatness it clearly has the ambition for. The promise of a heist thriller with a fresh screenplay treatment is real – the stumble in the last act is what stops it from getting there."

Gopika Is of The Times of India said that "The film is a watchable thriller with enough engaging moments. Its strong performances, social commentary and technical finesse make it worth a watch."
