= Aby Tom Cyriac =

Indian singer and composer

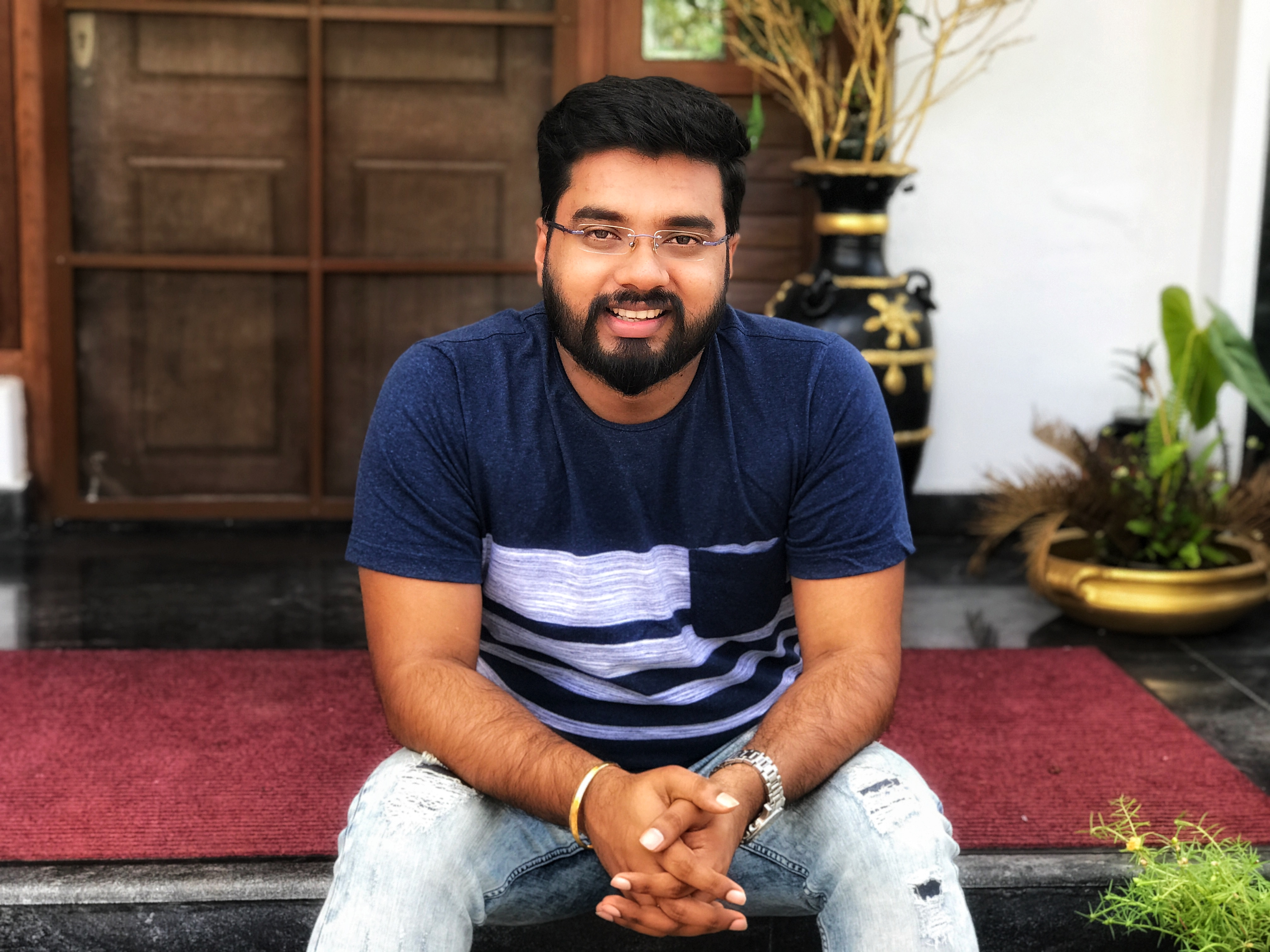
- Tom Cyriac in November 2018

Background information
- Born: Kanjirappally, Kottayam, Kerala, India
- Genres: Film score, electronic music
- Occupations: Music producer, music director, arranger, conductor, programmer, music programmer, composer
- Instruments: Vocals, guitar, drums, electronic keyboard,
- Years active: 2005–present
- Spouse: Grace Antony (m. 2025)
- Website: www.abytomcyriac.com

Aby Tom Cyriac is an Indian composer, arranger and music producer. He is a well known music producer to major music composers in the Indian film industry.

== Early life ==
Aby Tom Cyriac was born in Kanjirappally, Kottayam, Kerala to Mr.Cyriac Thomas and Mrs.Shaji Cyriac.

His musical abilities were spotted early in his life, and he started working with church choirs when he was studying in 5th standard. At such a young age, he had also started playing for several stage programs. He started exploring his music life when he met Fr. Sebastian Vechookarottu who is a Priest as well as a musician. It was Fr. Sebastian who opened him the wide world of music through different opportunities. The development of his career was through devotional songs and programs.

== Personal life ==
Aby Tom Cyriac married actress Grace Antony on 9 September 2025 in a private ceremony at the Our Lady of Dolours Roman Catholic Church, Thuthiyoor, Kerala, after being in a relationship for nine years.

== Career ==
=== Music Production ===
His interests, later on moved to Music Production. He got a chance to work for film music when he was in college, doing his B.Com. Since then he has been working in the industry producing music for many well known composers. Apart from Malayalam, he has got opportunities to work with some of the leading composers in Tamil, Telugu and Kannada film industry as well. By 2025 he has arranged and produced music for more than 250 movies and 100 Jingles in different languages, including soundtrack and background scores.

=== Film scoring and soundtracks ===
Aby debuted as an independent music composer through the 2013 produced Malayalam movie Second Innings. The movie did not get released due to some technical problems. Later in 2015, he composed music for movie Pavada Starring Prithviraj Sukumaran. The songs were super hit and were in the top charts.

== Discography ==
Films
Year	Title	Language	Notes
2013	Second Innings	Malayalam	Debut movie as a film composer
2016	Pavada	Malayalam	Jayasurya & Nedumudi Venu have sung in the film
2016	Shikhamani	Malayalam	Trailer music only
2017	Kadalassu Thoni	Malayalam	Musical
2018	Nirvana	Malayalam	Musical Short
2019	Sakalakalashala	Malayalam	Released
2020	Pathmalochanante Pavizha Mallika	Malayalam	Pre Production

Short Films
Year	Short Film	Language	Notes
2014	Murugan	Malayalam	Short Docu Drama
2015	Moonnamidam	Malayalam	Produced by Jayasurya, DBISFF Best Original Music Award, EKTA Short Film Festival Best Music Director, Festellen Film Festival Best Music Director
2017	Good Day	Malayalam	Directed by Adwaith Jayasurya
