= Maharani (2023 film) =

2023 Malayalam film by G. Marthandan

- Theatrical release poster
- Directed by: G. Marthandan
- Written by: Ratheesh Ravi
- Produced by: Sujit Balan
- Starring: Roshan Mathew; Shine Tom Chacko; Lizabeth Tomy; Johny Antony; Kailash
- Cinematography: Loganathan Srinivasan
- Edited by: Noufal Abdullah
- Music by: Govind Vasantha (songs); Gopi Sundar (score)
- Production companies: SB Films; Badusha Productions
- Distributed by: Badushaa Cinemas Release (through Aan Mega Media)
- Release date: 24 November 2023
- Running time: 127 minutes
- Country: India
- Language: Malayalam

Maharani (transl. The Great Queen) is a 2023 Indian Malayalam-language comedy-drama film directed by G. Marthandan. The film stars Roshan Mathew and Shine Tom Chacko, alongside Johny Antony, Harisree Ashokan, Balu Varghese, Jaffar Idukki, Nisha Sarang and Sruthy Jayan.

The film was officially announced in September 2022. Principal photography began in October in Cherthala and wrapped up in November. The songs were composed by Govind Vasantha, while the background score was given by Gopi Sundar. The cinematography and editing were handled by Loganathan Srinivasan and Noufal Abdullah.

Maharani was released on 24 November 2023.

== Cast ==
- Roshan Mathew as Vijeesh a.k.a. Viji
- Shine Tom Chacko as Ajeesh a.k.a. Aji
- Johny Antony as Manmadhan, Vijeesh and Ajeesh's father
- Lizabeth Tomy as Rani
- Harisree Ashokan as Maniyan, Rani's father
- Balu Varghese as Renny, Rani's brother
- Sruthy Jayan as Kavya, Ajeesh's girlfriend
- Nisha Sarang as Mangalam, Vijeesh and Ajeesh's mother
- Sminu Sijo as Radhamani, Rani's mother
- Kailash as Anzar
- Unni Lalu as Shibu
- Jaffar Idukki as Sakhavu
- Reghunath Paleri as Karunan Master
- Aswath Lal as Sajith
- Sujith Balan as Tony
- Gowi Gopan as Arya Gopinath

== Production ==
=== Development ===
Maharani marks the return of G. Marthandan after a five-year gap following Johny Johny Yes Appa (2018). In an interview with The Hindu, he said that the film was planned earlier and the cast was finalised in 2019 but things got delayed due to the COVID-19 pandemic. The project was officially launched in late September 2023 in Kochi with a customary puja ceremony. Sujit Balan produced the film under the banner of SB Films, in association with Badusha Productions. The film also marks the banner's initial production. The script was written by Ratheesh Ravi, who is known for Ishq (2019) and Adi (2023). It marks his first collaboration with G. Marthandan. Loganathan Srinivasan and Noufal Abdullah were assigned as the cinematographer and editor, respectively.

=== Filming ===
Principal photography reportedly began on 1 October 2022 in Cherthala and Alappuzha. The filming wrapped up in the first week of November 2022. It was reportedly the first film in Kerala to be completely shot with Sony's Venice 2 camera.

== Music ==
The songs were composed by Govind Vasantha and the background score was provided by Gopi Sundar. The first song "Chathayadina Paatu" was released on 31 August 2023, sung by Kapil Kapilan and written by Anwar Ali.

== Release ==
The film was censored with a U/A certificate by the Central Board of Film Certification. Maharani was released in theatres on 24 November 2023.

== Reception ==
=== Critical response ===
Anandu Suresh of The Indian Express gave 2 out of 5 stars and wrote, "Maharani is a watchable film if you are ready to completely switch off your brain and let the movie guide you on its journey." Anna Mathews of The Times of India gave 2 out of 5 stars and wrote, "Ultimately, it feels strange that director G Marthandan, the actors and producer Sujit Balan felt that this story by Ratheesh Ravi was worth their effort."

Swathi P. Ajith of Onmanorama wrote, "The film seems decent but lacks brilliance. Although there are scenes that provoke laughter and curiosity – such as Aji and his gang embarking on a bike journey in search of Rani – the overall impact is moderate." Vignesh Madhu of Cinema Express gave 2 out of 5 stars and wrote, "The film gets funniest when Roshan, Shine and Johny Antony are together, but this union doesn't happen too often."
