= Sreeshma Chandran =

Indian actress

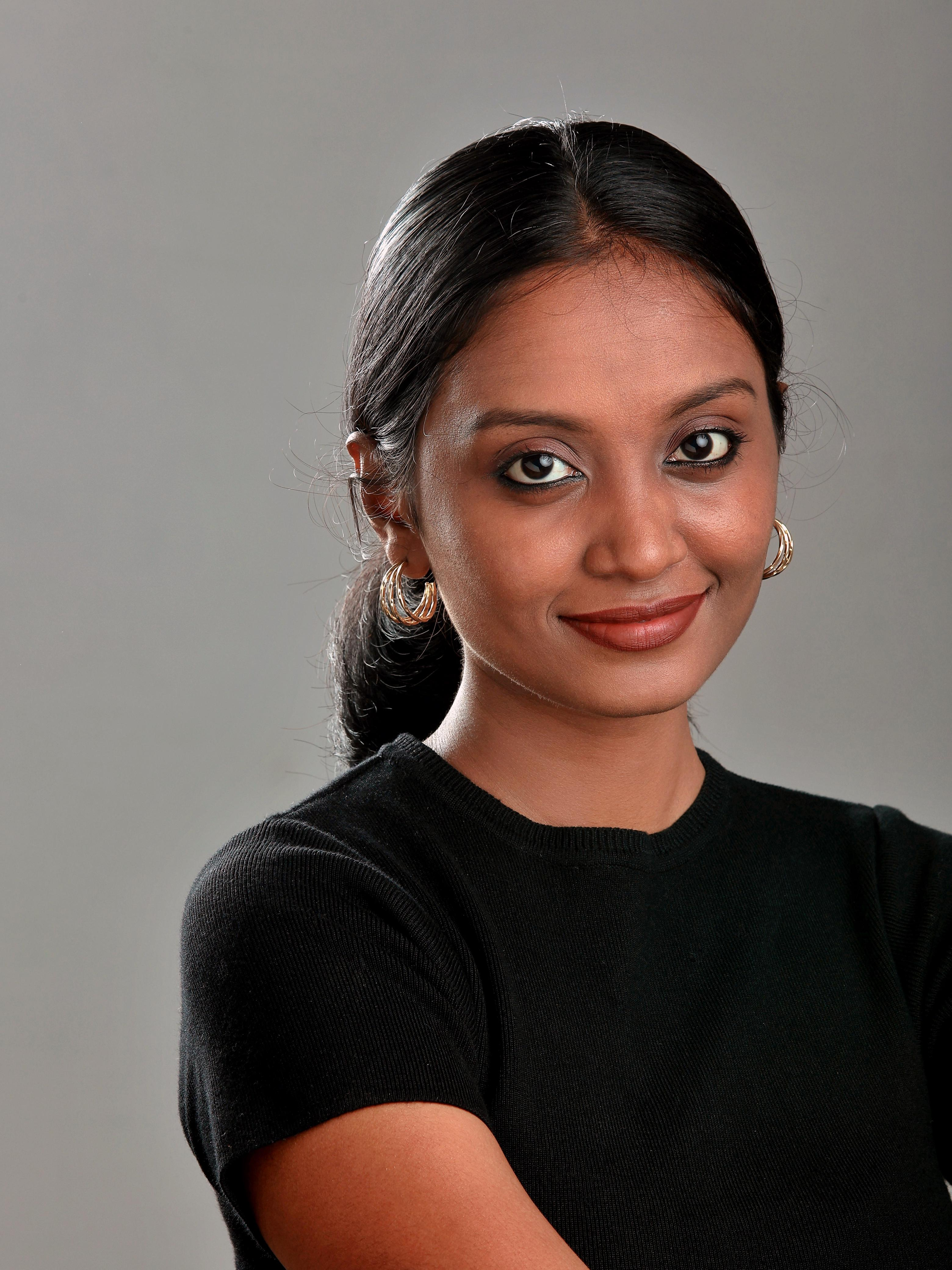
- Born: Thrissur, Kerala
- Occupation: Actress
- Years active: 2018

Sreeshma Chandran is an Indian actress recognized for her role in Pombalai Orumai, which won her the 2023 Kerala State Film Award for Best Character Actress.

== Family and early life ==
Sreeshma was born in Avittapally, Kodakara, Thrissur district, the eldest daughter of Chandran and Vanaja. She has a sister named Shreya Chandran.After completing her schooling in Elamakkara, Sreeshma completed her graduation from Maharaja's College, Ernakulam and her post-graduation from St. Thomas College, Thrissur.Sreeshma, who participated in plays during her college years, made her debut in 2018 with the role of a college student in her first film, Poomaram.

== Filmography ==
Year	Title	Role	Notes	Ref.
2018	Poomaram	Meenakshi(Meenu)	Debut film	
2024	Pombalai Orumai	Sunitha		
2024	Victoria	Leya (Friend)		
2025	Arik	Panchami		
2026	Padayaatra		Mammootty,Adoor Gopalakrishnan's film	

== Accolades ==
Year	Award	Category	Recipient	Result	Notes	Ref.
2024	54th Kerala State Film Awards	Kerala State Film Award for Best Character Actress	Pombalai Orumai	Won		
