= Sakalakalashala =

2019 Malayalam comedy-drama film

- Film poster
- Directed by: Vinod Guruvayoor
- Screenplay by: Murali Guinness; Jayaraj
- Story by: Vinod Guruvayoor
- Produced by: Shaji Moothedan
- Starring: Niranjan Raju; Manasa Radhakrishnan
- Cinematography: Manoj Pillai
- Edited by: Riyas
- Music by: Aby Tom Cyriac
- Release date: 25 January 2019
- Country: India
- Language: Malayalam

Sakalakalashala is a 2019 Indian Malayalam-language comedy-drama film directed by Vinod Guruvayoor and starring Niranjan Raju and Manasa Radhakrishnan.

== Synopsis ==
Akbar is an engineering student. He makes everyone proud when he wins the first prize in a tech fest. However, things take a turn when one of his technical innovation backfires and leaves him in serious trouble.

== Cast ==
- Niranjan Raju as Akbar Salam alias Akku
- Manasa Radhakrishnan as Mumtaz
- Jacob Gregory as Kannan, Akku's friend
- Dharmajan Bolgatty as Akku's friend
- Hareesh Kanaran as Nari
- Arun Nadaraj as Faizy
- Jenson Alappat
- Grace Antony as Mumtaz's friend
- Saju Navodaya
- Nirmal Palazhi
- Anil Murali as Louis, Police officer
- Renji Panicker
- Rony Raj as Basil
- Shravan Satya as Shravan
- Ramesh Thilak
- Shammi Thilakan as Kallarakkal Achan
- Tini Tom as Kolathiparambil Achan
- Saniya Iyappan as Swapna (Cameo Appearance)

== Production ==
The film is set in a college campus. Murali Guinness wrote the film's screenplay.

== Soundtrack ==
The songs are composed by Aby Tom Cyriac. The song "Pandarakalan Mathai" is based on the song "Panchara Paalu Mittayi" from Bharya (1962).

No.	Title	Singer(s)	Length
1.	"Mandarappoovum (Duet)"	Karthik, Swetha Mohan	3:49
2.	"Mandarappoovum (Male)"	Karthik	3:49
3.	"Illatha Kashinu"	Benny Dayal	3:31
4.	"Vambu Venda"	Keerthan Berny, Priya Jerson	3:17
5.	"Pandara Kalan Mathai"	Dharmajan Bolgatty	1:54
Total length:			16:20

== Reception ==
The Times of India gave the film a rating of three out of five stars and noted that "The length of the movie, which stands at only about 2 hrs 15 minutes is a big plus, because at no point does the film feel like it is lagging". Deccan Chronicle gave the film two out of five stars and wrote that "The film tries to deal with a very serious and relevant topic, but a strong and well-written script could have been more helpful". The Times of India Samayam gave the film a rating of two-and-a-half out of five stars and praised the screenplay and cinematography.
