= Paavada =

2016 film by G. Marthandan

- Theatrical release poster
- Directed by: G. Marthandan
- Screenplay by: Bipin Chandran
- Story by: Bipin Chandran; Shibin Francis
- Produced by: Maniyanpilla Raju
- Starring: Prithviraj Sukumaran; Miya; Anoop Menon; Asha Sarath; Nedumudi Venu; Maniyanpilla Raju
- Narrated by: Anil Nedumangad
- Cinematography: Pradeep Nair
- Edited by: Johnkutty
- Music by: Score: Gopi Sunder; Songs: Aby Tom Cyriac
- Production company: Maniyanpilla Raju Productions
- Distributed by: Anto Joseph Release & Tricolor Entertainment
- Release date: 15 January 2016 (India)
- Running time: 145 minutes
- Country: India
- Language: Malayalam
- Box office: est. ₹34 crore

Paavada (transl. Skirt) is a 2016 Indian comedy drama film directed by G. Marthandan and written by Bipin Chandran, based on the story he co-wrote with Shibin Francis. The film is about the life of two alcoholics. It stars Prithviraj Sukumaran and Anoop Menon in lead roles along with Miya, Asha Sarath, Nedumudi Venu and Maniyanpilla Raju in supporting roles. The film was produced by Maniyanpilla Raju. The music was composed by Aby Tom Cyriac and released under the label Muzik 247.

Paavada released on 15 January 2016. The film was a commercial success, grossing ₹35 crore (US$3.6 million) at the box office.

== Synopsis ==
The film opens with a poem by the Pakistani poet Faiz Ahmad Faiz. An alcoholic duo meet at a de-addiction center helps each other to arrange their lives back together with their persistent illness. Pambu Joy's married life is in a muddle due to his alcoholism. Pavada Babu's life is in pieces due to a film he produced in which Sicily, Joy's mother, was the heroine, and was directed by his close friend Chandramohan, who died soon after shooting the film. For financial gain, the film was adulterated by his friend Eldho. Eldho intends to re-release the film's 3D extended version. Both Joy and Babu fight through their alcoholism to stop the re-release of the film due to the added pain that it will cause for Babu and to Joy's mother Sicily forms the crux of the story.

== Cast ==
- Prithviraj Sukumaran as Joy Varghese (Pambu Joy)
  - Athul as Toddler Joy
- Anoop Menon as Ex dismissed Professor Babu Joseph (Paavada Babu)
- Miya George as Sinimol, Joy's Wife
- Asha Sarath as Sicily Varghese, Joy's mother
- Maniyanpilla Raju as Advocate Gunasekharan Nair, Babu's Friend
- Nedumudi Venu as Ayyappan Pillai
- Kalabhavan Shajohn as Eldho Kunnanthanam
- Sharaf U Dheen as Vilakkoothi Rajan, Joy's Friend
- Sudheer Karamana as Fr. Stephen
- Chemban Vinod Jose as Fr. Kattipparamban
- Jayakrishnan as Kallu Varkki, Joy's Father
- Manikuttan as SI Suresh
- Kunchan as Cleetus, Bar Manager
- Murali Gopy as Chandramohan
- Saikumar as Joseph, Babu's Father
- Siddique as Advocate Anantharama Iyer
- Renji Panicker as Paul Zacharia
- Anil Nedumangad as Chacko, Toddy Shop Drunker
- Lakshmi Sanal as Sajini/Saleenamma
- Maala Parvathi as Mother Superior
- Chali Pala as Advocate Kailash
- Sunil Sukhada as Thevally Manoharan
- Binu Adimali as Police constable Sugathan
- Kalabhavan Haneef as Kapyar Varghese
- Dinesh Prabhakar as Thattukada Kunjumon
- Shaju Sreedhar as MLA's Brother-in-Law
- Purushu as Ayyappan
- Surjith Gopinath as Drunkard
- Vineeth Thattil David as a man working in deaddiction center
- Manju Warrier as Babu's Fiancée (cameo appearance)
- Mamitha Baiju (child artist, uncredited)

== Production ==
Earlier, Shobana was approached for the role of Sicily, but the actress turned down the role as she was not willing to do mother role of Prithviraj, she was replaced by Asha Sarath. Actor Jayasurya has sung a song for the film, titled "Kuruthakkedinte Koodanu," composed by Aby Tom Cyriac, which describes the character of Joy (Prithviraj). According to Maniyanpilla Raju, the film will have "a lot of twists".

== Music ==
Paavada

Soundtrack album by Aby Tom Cyriac
- Released: 10 January 2016
- Genre: Film soundtrack
- Length: 10:02
- Label: Muzik 247
- Producer: Maniyan Pilla Raju

Aby Tom Cyriac chronology
Second Innings (2013)	Paavada (2016)	Shikamani (2016)

The film's songs are composed by Aby Tom Cyriac with lyrics written by B. K. Hari Narayanan. There are three songs and one is a promo song sung by Nedumudi Venu. Jayasurya, K. G. Ranjith and Nedumudi Venu are the singers. The music was released through the label Muzik 247. The audio music launch was held in a low profile event at Kochi in December 2015, the money generated from which went to Chennai flood victims' relief funds. Aby Tom Cyriac has sampled music from Indian ethnic genre of the early 80s and late 90s.

Track listing
No.	Title	Singer(s)	Length
1.	"Kuruthakkedinte Koodane"	Jayasurya	4:11
2.	"Paavam Paavada"	Ranjith	3:12
3.	"Eha Loka Jeevitham"	Nedumudi Venu	2:38
Total length:			10:02

== Release ==
=== Theatrical ===
Paavada released on 15 January 2016.

== Reception ==
=== Box office ===
Paavada grossed approximately ₹23 crore (US$2.4 million) in the opening weekend from India box office. The film's final gross collection is estimated as ₹34 crore (US$3.5 million) with a share of ₹17 crore (US$1.8 million). It completed 100 days theatrical run in the state.

=== Critical response ===
The Times of India rated 3.5 out of 5 stars and stated that the movie does try to explain alcoholism as a way of dealing with helplessness and how it can ruin one's credibility. Rediff.com gave 3.5 out of 5: Bipin Chandran's screenplay discusses the ethical, moral and legal issues pertaining to such situations. There are elaborate court scenes that test our patience for two and a half hours. This is one of the fertile periods in Prithviraj's career and he makes it even better with this film. He has to be a breezily comic fellow in the first half that he does unpretentiously making this film yet another winner as far as his performance goes. He gets able support from Anoop Menon, Nedumudi Venu and Maniyanpilla Raju. Paavada can be called a decent effort only if we ignore the flaws. Indiaglitz rated 4 out of 5 and said The story, screenplay and dialogues by Bipin Chandran deserves credit. Director Marthandan could capture the essence of the story and deliver a good narration. Background score was conventional. Editing and cinematography were good with the editing being sharp and camera angles very effective, especially the dramatic part involving Prithviraj and the fight sequences. Performances from Prithviraj, Anoop Menon and Nedumudi were outstanding. Prithviraj has proved his range with this cinema as he lives as Joy onscreen. Anoop Menon holds his own in a demanding character. Miya was adorable as Joy's wife. "Paavada" is sure to stay around for a long time for its one-liners and humour.
