= Karunakaran (Malayalam writer) =

Malayalam writer

- Born: Pattambi, Palakkad, Kerala, India
- Occupations: Novelist, short story writer, poet, essayist
- Notable work: Yuvaavaayirunna Onpathu Varsham; Pāyakkappal; Yakṣiyuṃ Cycle Yātr̲akkāranuṃ
- Awards: O. V. Vijayan Sahitya Puraskaram

Karunakaran is an Indian poet, novelist, short story writer and essayist who writes in Malayalam. Known for an original style of writing, he has published a number of novels, short story anthologies, poetry anthologies, studies and essays. He was born in Pattambi, a town in Palakkad district of the south Indian state of Kerala. His oeuvre comprises novels such as Yuvaavaayirunna Onpathu Varsham and short story anthologies like Paayakkappal and he is a recipient of the 2019 O. V. Vijayan Sahitya Puraskaram. He lives in Kuwait.

== Selected bibliography ==
=== Novels ===
- Karunakaran (2011). Bicycle Thief (in Malayalam). Mathrubhumi Books. p. 124. ISBN 9788182650398.
- Karuṇākaran (2017). Yuvāvāyirunna Onpathu Varṣhaṃ. Kottayam, Kerala State, India. ISBN 978-81-264-7495-0. OCLC 1027058947.
- Karunakaran (2023). Kettezhuthukari (in Malayalam). Kottayam: DC Books. ASIN B0BRZGLSG1.

=== Novellas ===
- Karunakaran (2001). Parasya Jeevitham. DC Books. ASIN B007E4WTBS.
- Karuṇākaran (2012). Yuddhakālatte Nuṇakaḷuṃ Marakkompile Kākkayuṃ. Kottayam: D C Books. ISBN 978-81-264-3557-9. OCLC 810316812.

=== Short story anthologies ===
- Karuṇākaran (2000). Pāyakkappal. Kottayam: DC Books. p. 79. ISBN 81-264-0099-4. OCLC 45916633.
- Karunakaran (2010). Kochiyile Nalla Sthree. Sign Books. p. 90. ISBN 9780000130570.
- Karuṇākaran (2012). Ekanthathaye Kurichu Paranju Kettitteyulloo. Kottayam: D C Books.
- Karuṇākaran (2014). Atikupitanāya Kut̲t̲ānvēṣakanuṃ Mat̲t̲u Kathakaḷuṃ. Kottayam. ISBN 978-81-264-5159-3. OCLC 908107454.
- Karuṇākaran (2020). Bourgeois Snehithan (in Malayalam). Mātr̥bhūmi Buks. ISBN 9789355494405.

=== Poetry anthologies ===
- Karuṇākaran (2017). Yakṣiyuṃ Cycle Yātr̲akkāranuṃ. Ayyanthole, Thrissur: Green Books. ISBN 978-93-86440-56-3. OCLC 1119066336.

=== Essays ===
- Karunakaran (2016). Udal Enna Moham (in Malayalam). Logos Books. p. 212. ISBN 9789385064814.

== See also ==
- S. Hareesh
- N. Prabhakaran
