= Mayooranritham =

- Directed by: Vijayakrishnan
- Produced by: C. Radhakrishnan
- Starring: Mohini; Kumarakam Raghunath; Vikram; Madhupal; Beena Antony
- Music by: G. Devarajan
- Release date: 26 January 1996
- Running time: 175 minutes
- Country: India
- Language: Malayalam

Mayooranritham (transl. Peacock dance) is a 1996 Indian Malayalam-language romantic drama film, directed by Vijayakrishnan. The film stars Mohini, Kumarakam Raghunath, Vikram, Madhupal and Beena Antony in the lead roles. The film has musical score by G. Devarajan.

== Plot ==
Ragini's wedding is negatively affected when her boyfriend's family learns that her mother is a prostitute. Ragini is mad at her mother for disturbing her marriage; howerver, she is unaware of the truth.

== Cast ==
- Mohini as Ragini
- Kumarakam Raghunath as Professor Balachandran
- Vikram as Rajeev
- Madhupal as Jayadevan
- Beena Antony as Sujatha
- Narendra Prasad as Sankaranarayan
- Jagathy Sreekumar as Sarangathan Pilla
- Jagannathan as Gopalan
- Kanakalatha as Sakuntala
- Azeez as Avarachan
- Karyavattom Sasikumar as Rajendran
- Adoor Pankajam as Bhavaniyamma
- Indrans as Dr Kulkarni
- Thikkurussy Sukumaran Nair
- Poojappura Radhakrishnan

== Production ==
Actor Karyavattom Sasikumar worked as the executive producer of the film.

== Soundtrack ==
The music was composed by G. Devarajan and the lyrics were written by P. Bhaskaran.

No.	Song	Singers	Lyrics	Length (m:ss)
1	"Manjin Yavanika"	K. J. Yesudas	P. Bhaskaran
2	"Paada Pooja"	K. J. Yesudas, K. S. Chithra	P. Bhaskaran
3	"Shilpi Vishwashilpi"	K. J. Yesudas	P. Bhaskaran
