= Daddy Cool (2009 Malayalam film) =

- Theatrical release poster
- Directed by: Aashiq Abu
- Written by: Bipin Chandran; Aashiq Abu (dialogues)
- Produced by: Bose Kurian; Alwyn Antony
- Starring: Mammootty; Dhananjay; Richa Pallod; Daniel Balaji; Biju Menon; Radhika; Govind Padmasoorya
- Cinematography: Sameer Thahir
- Edited by: V. Sajan
- Music by: Bijibal
- Production companies: Ananya Films; Marikar Films
- Distributed by: Marikar Release
- Release date: 7 August 2009
- Running time: 157 minutes
- Country: India
- Language: Malayalam

Daddy Cool is a 2009 Indian Malayalam-language action film starring Mammootty, Dhananjay, Richa Pallod, Daniel Balaji and Biju Menon in the lead roles. The film was the directorial debut of Aashiq Abu. The film commenced its shooting in December 2008. The locations were Cochin and Hong Kong.

The movie was released worldwide on August 7, 2009, and received mixed reviews.

== Plot ==
The story line of the film is the escapades of a cricket crazy kid, all of eight years and his father, a cop. Antony Simon is a crime branch CI, but prefers to spend his time fooling around with his son Aadi. And being a Crime Branch police officer, his rather laid-back attitude is not appreciated by his peers and superiors. Annie his wife finds this irritating.

The father-son duo becomes friends with the famous national cricketer Sreekanth when they save him from some street fight. Once while the father-son duo was out for shopping, Aadi saw a man with the gun and screams at his father. Simon turns back and shoots him, but he kills the wrong person. Antony now faces murder charges and is suspended from duty.

Later that day, Aadhi is found missing. Antony being a cop, the entire police force in the district is in search. They find that Shakthi, the one who was killed by Simon was the younger brother of Shiva the leader of a gang who were trying to get Sreekanth into a match-fixing deal and from whom Antony saved Sreekanth once. They are trying to get revenge on Simon for killing Shakthi and that is why they abducted Aadi. The rest of the film is about how Simon fights Shiva and his gang and gets Aadhi back from them with the help of Sreekanth and Roy Alex in the brave ways.

== Cast ==
- Mammootty as CI Antony Simon
- Master Dhananjay as Adi Antony
- Biju Menon as Roy Isaac
- Richa Pallod as Annie Antony
- Daniel Balaji as Shiva
- Ashish Vidyarthi as Bheem Bhai
- Vijayaraghavan as DYSP Varghese
- Sai Kumar as Shiva Prasad
- Baburaj as Soman
- Vinayakan as Selva, Shiva's henchman
- Govind Padmasoorya as Sreekanth, a cricketer
- Anoop Chandran as Kappal Basheer
- Rajan P. Dev as Isaac Zachariah, Roy's father
- P. Sreekumar as Annie's father
- Ambika Mohan as Annie's mother
- Radhika as Milly, Annie's sister
- Babu Swamy
- Gopakumar
- Suraj Venjaramood as Ainkutty/Selvan (cameo appearance)
- Lena Kumar as Adi's class teacher (cameo appearance)
- Bipin Chandran as The News Reader (cameo appearance)
- Nikita Thukral as item number in the song "Saamba Salsa".
- Archived footage of Vijay is also used

== Production ==
The original script of the film was written by Bipin Chandran but he presented it to Aashiq Abu who didn't gave him any credit (later credited as dialogue writer) The role of a cricketer was first offered to S. Sreesanth before it was given to Govind Padmasoorya.

== Soundtrack ==
The film features a soundtrack, consisting of 6 songs, composed by Bijibal.

No.	Title	Lyrics	Artist(s)	Length
1.	"Daddy Cool"	R. Venugopal	Gayatri Suresh
2.	"Daddy My Daddy"	Santhosh Varma	Swetha Mohan, Sanand Unnithan, Aditya Krishna, Amrutha Krishna, Anju Bhaskaran
3.	"Kadha"	Anil Panachooran	Bijibal
4.	"Kadhayoru"	Anil Panachooran	Hariharan
5.	"Samba"	Santhosh Varma	Jassie Gift
6.	"Samba Salsa"	Santhosh Varma	Anuradha Sriram, Jassie Gift

== Reception ==
Sify rated the film 3/5 and noted that "In all fairness, Daddy Cool is meant to be a visual spectacle not to be taken with much seriousness. In the current form, it leaves you just cold or to a great extent, let down!". Paresh C. Palicha of Rediff rated the film 1.5/5 and opined that "Malayalam film Daddy Cool directed by newcomer Aashiq Abu is one more substandard film of Mammootty to hit the theatres in the recent times after Ee Pattanathil Bhootham".
