= Thadavu =

- Theatrical release poster
- Directed by: Fazil Razak
- Written by: Fazil Razak
- Produced by: Pramod Dev; Fazil Razak
- Starring: Beena R. Chandran; P P Subramanian; Anitha NM; Ishak Musafir; Haritha P
- Cinematography: Mridul S
- Edited by: Vinayak Suthan
- Music by: Vaisakh Somanath
- Production companies: FR Productions; Bunch of Coconuts
- Release dates: 29 October 2023 (MAMI); 21 February 2025
- Running time: 90 minutes
- Country: India
- Language: Malayalam

Thadavu (transl. The Sentence) is a 2025 Malayalam language drama film written and directed by Fazil Razak. Produced under FR Productions and Bunch of Coconuts, it features Beena Chandran, P. P. Subramanian, Anitha NM, Ishak Musafir and Haritha P. The film had its world premiere at the Jio MAMI Mumbai Film Festival 2023 on 29 October 2023.

== Cast ==
- Beena R. Chandran as Geetha
- P. P. Subramanian as Hamza, Geetha's friend
- Anitha N. M. as Uma
- Ishak Musafir as Sujith, auto driver
- Haritha P. as Neethu

== Release ==
The film was released theatrically on 21 February 2025.

== Reception ==
Anandu Suresh of The Indian Express gave the film three-and-a-half out of five stars. Swaroop Kodur of Film Companion and S. R. Praveen of The Hindu reviewed the film.

=== Accolades ===
Year	Award	Category	Recipient	Result	Ref.
2023	International Film Festival of Kerala	Rajatha Chakoram for Best Film	Thadavu	Won	
2023	International Film Festival of Kerala	Rajatha Chakoram for Best Director	Fazil Razak	Won	
2023	Kerala Film Critics Association Awards	Second Best Film	Thadavu	Won	
2024	Kerala State Film Awards	Best Actress	Beena R. Chandran	Won	
2024	Kerala State Film Awards	Best Debut Director	Fazil Razak	Won	
