= Gourav Menon =

Indian actor (born 2004)

- Born: 13 November 2004 (age 21); Kerala, India
- Occupation: Actor
- Years active: 2013–present
- Awards: National Film Award for Best Child Artist, 2015; Kerala State Film Award for Best Child Artist, 2015

Gourav Menon (born 13 November 2004), also known as Master Gaurav Menon, is an Indian actor from the Malayalam film industry. Making his acting debut with Philips and the Monkey Pen in 2013, Gourav later won the National Film Award for Best Child Artist and the Kerala State Film Award for Best Child Artist in 2015 for the film Ben.

== Filmography ==
Year	Title	Role	Notes
2013	Philips and the Monkey Pen	Jugru	Debut Film
2014	Happy Journey		
2015	Polytechnic		
2015	Homely Meals	Sanju	
2015	Alif	Akbar Ali	
2015	Oru Vadakkan Selfie	Mohan's Son	
2015	Chirakodinja Kinavukal	Praveen	
2015	Kumbasaaram	Rasool	
2015	Nirnayakam	Young Ajay	
2015	Jilebi	Pachu	
2015	Life of Josutty	Young Josutty	
2015	Ben	Ben	
2015	Aana Mayil Ottakam		
2016	Appuram Bengal Ippuram Thiruvithamkoor	Babukuttan	
2016	Kolumittayi	Unni	
2017	Chakkara Maavin Kombathu		
2018	Kuttanadan Marpappa	Young John	
2018	Jungle.com		
2019	A for Apple	Young Achu	

== Awards ==
Year	Nominee / work	Award	Result
2015	Ben	National Film Award for Best Child Artist	Won
2015	Ben	Kerala State Film Award for Best Child Artist	Won
