= A for Apple =

2019 Malayalam-language film

- Theatrical release poster
- Directed by: B. Madhu and S. Kumar
- Screenplay by: Rajesh Jayaraman
- Story by: P. F. Mathews
- Produced by: Sudarsanan Kanjiramkulam
- Starring: Tony Sigimon; Janvi Byju; Sheela; Nedumudi Venu; Devan; Salim Kumar; Krishna Kumar; Saju Navodaya; Sajal SS; Pradeep Kottayam; Sethu Lakshmi; Gourav Menon; Kalyani Nair
- Cinematography: M. J. Radhakrishnan
- Edited by: V.T. Sreejith
- Music by: Jerry Amaldev; Bijibal
- Production company: Swarnalaya Cinemas
- Distributed by: Swarnalaya Cinemas
- Release date: 19 July 2019
- Running time: 140 minutes
- Country: India
- Language: Malayalam

A for Apple is a 2019 Malayalam-language film directed by the duo B. Madhu and S. Kumar and produced by Sudarsanan Kanjiramkulam. The story was by P. F. Mathews and the screenplay was written by Rajesh Jayaraman. Jerry Amaldev is the music composer and Sreekumaran Thampi was the lyricist; Bijibal composed the background score. Tony Sigimon, Janvi Byju, Nedumudi Venu, Sheela, Salim Kumar, Devan, and Santhosh Keezhattoor acted in the film's major roles.

== Plot ==
Years after he left, Achu is back looking for his childhood friend Vishnupriya. Although she has changed beyond his recognition, he still loves her and tries to win her over. Vishnupriya, now a rebel activist, is looking for answers from her past and has no time for love.

== Cast ==
- Tony Sijimon as Achu
  - Gourav Menon as Young Achu
- Janvi Byju as Vishnupriya
  - Baby Niranjana as Young Vishnupriya
- Nedumudi Venu as Narayanan
- Sheela as Lakshmi
- Krishna Kumar as advocate Ram Mohan
- Devan as Ahmed Haji
- Santhosh Keezhattoor as Sub Inspector Jayasankar
- Salim Kumar as Muhammed
- Sajal SS as Anish
- Pradeep Kottayam
- Sethu Lakshmi
- Saju Navodaya
- Kalyani Nair

== Music ==
Jerry Amaldev was the music director and Bijibal composed the background score. Sreekumaran Thampi was the lyricist. Sound mixing was done by Krishnan Unni.

Track-List
No.	Title	Singer(s)	Length
1.	"Ethra Sundaram"	K.S. Chithra, Abhijeet Bhattacharya	5:58
2.	"Thottu Thottu Vidarnnu"	Chinmayi, Vijay Yesudas	3:46
3.	"Unaram Uyaram"	Dr. Rashmi Madhu	3:46
Total length:			13:30
