= Savithri Rajeevan =

Indian writer and artist

Savithri Rajeevan is an Indian poet, short story writer and painter. One of the leading female writers in Malayalam, she has published four collections of poetry and a volume of short fiction.

She was born in 1956 in Malappuram district, Kerala. After graduating in Malayalam literature from the University of Kerala, she studied at the University of Baroda Faculty of Fine Arts. She was a jury member of Kerala State Chalachitra Academy in 2009. She has also served as Vice President of the Lalit Kala Akademi and as an Advisory Board Member of the Kendra Sahitya Akademi. Her poetry has been translated into various Indian languages as well as Swedish and English. She has been living together with writer B. Rajeevan from 1975 onwards.

Her works include Ammaye Kulippikkumpol (poetry), Savithri Rajeevante Kavithakal (poetry) and Sanchariyude Thanupoya Veedu (stories). Savithri has won many awards such as the Kerala Sahitya Akademi Award (2016, for Ammaye Kulippikkumpol) and the Kamala Surayya Award (2011, for Savithri Rajeevante Kavithakal).

== Works ==
Savithri has published four collections of poetry and a volume of short fiction.

=== Poetry ===
- Cherivu (1993, Pakshikkottam Books, Trivandrum)
- Dehantaram (1999, Mulberry Books, Calicut)
- Savithri Rajeevante Kavithakal (2009, Mathrubhumi Books, Calicut)
- Ammaye Kulippikkumbol (2014, Mathrubhumi Books, Calicut)

=== Prose ===
- Sanchaariyude Thaanu Poya Veedu (2009, Mathrubhumi Books, Calicut)
