= B. Rajeevan =

Indian author

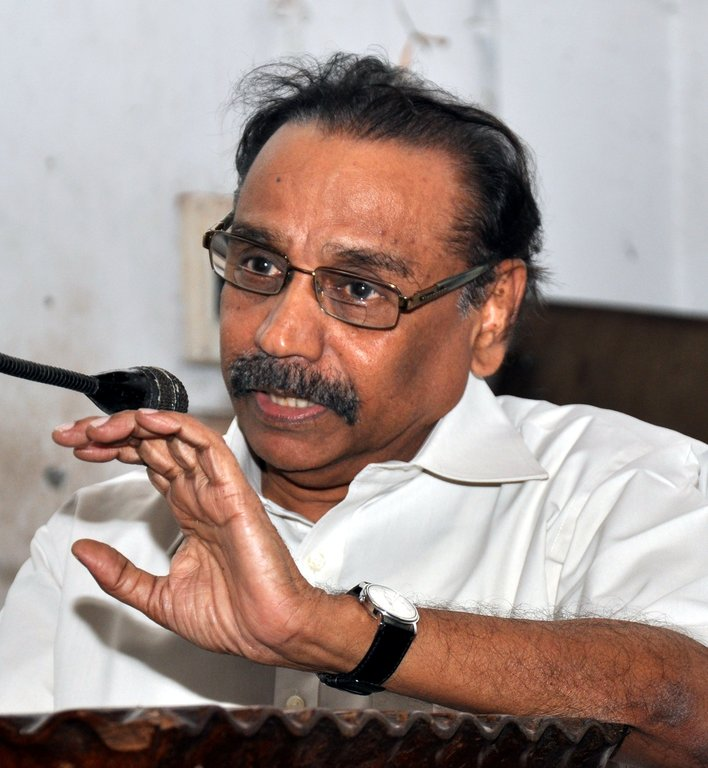
- Rajeevan in 2013
- Born: 1946 (age 79–80); Kayamkulam, Travancore
- Education: SN College, Quilon; University College, Trivandrum
- Occupations: Literary critic, author
- Writing career
- Period: 1997–present
- Genres: Literary criticism, essay
- Notable work: Vakkukalum Vasthukkalum

B. Rajeevan is a Malayalam author and literary critic from Kerala, India.

== Biography ==
He was born in 1946 in Kayamkulam near Quilon, Kerala. He studied at SN College, Quilon and University College, Trivandrum. He has been teaching Malayalam literature in government colleges since 1971. During the Emergency in 1975, he was branded as a Naxalite sympathiser and had to face police harassment and house arrest. In the eighties, he served on the State Committee of the Janakeeya Samskarika Vedi (People's Cultural Forum) and participated in various struggles. He was arrested and was expelled from his long-time college post. Since 1969, he has written and published essays on philosophy, aesthetics, history, political thought, film and poetry. He has been living together with poet Savithri Rajeevan from 1975 onwards.

He has a position as a jury member of the Kerala State Film Award Committee(1989) and is also the Chairman of the Jury on the John Abraham Award Committee.

== List of works ==
- Swathanthryathinte Samagratha (The Integrity of Freedom)
- Jaivarashtreeyavum Janasanjayavum (Biopolitics and Populism)
- Marxisavum Shasthravum (Marxism and Science)
- Anyavalkaranavum Yogavum (Alienation and Destiny)
- Jananibidamaya Danthagopuram
- Varthamanathinte Charithram (History of the Present)
- Vakkukalum Vasthukkalum (Words and Objects)
- EMSinte Swapnam (The Dream of EMS)

== Awards ==
- Kerala Sahitya Akademi Award, 2011
- Chintha Ravindran Award, 2019
- Kerala Library Council Award, 2015
- M. N. Vijayan Award, 2014
- O. V. Vijayan Sahitya Puraskaram, 2013
- C. P. Menon Award, 2013
- Basheer Award, 2011
- Narendra Prasad Foundation Award, 2011
- Guru Darshana Award, 2011
- Shanthakumaran Thampi Foundation Award, 2011
