= Shibin Francis =

Indian screenwriter

- Born: 24 July 1987 (age 38); India
- Occupation: Screenwriter
- Notable work: Comrade in America

Shibin Francis (born 1987) is an Indian screenwriter. Shibin is the story writer of the Malayalam movie Paavada (2016). He is based in Chicago.

== Early life and background ==
He was born in Poovathodu village near Bharananganam Pala Kottayam, Kerala. He completed his schooling in Kottayam and moved to the United States with his parents. He is settled in California.

== Career ==
Shibin debuted in Malayalam films as a screenwriter for the Malayalam feature film starring Prithviraj Sukumaran, Anoop Menon and Manju Warrier named Paavada. This film was produced by noted film actor Maniyanpilla Raju and is directed by Marthandan. The film was released in January 2016.

He has signed up for Amal Neerad Productions as screenwriter for Amal Neerad's first film with Dulquer Salmaan in the lead. This film was released on 5 May 2017.

== Filmography ==
Year	Film	Notes
2016	Pavada	Debut film
2017	Comrade in America	
2019	Under World	
2021	Ottakkomban	
