= Acha Dhin =

Acha Din
- Film Poster
- Directed by: G. Marthandan
- Written by: Vijeesh A.C.
- Produced by: S. George
- Starring: Mammootty; Mansi Sharma; Maniyanpilla Raju; Renji Panicker
- Cinematography: Pradeep Nair
- Edited by: Ratheesh Raj
- Music by: Bijibal
- Production company: Cyn-Cyl Celluloid
- Release date: 17 July 2015
- Country: India
- Language: Malayalam

Acha Din (transl. A good day) is a 2015 Indian Malayalam-language action drama film written by Vijeesh A.C. and directed by G. Marthandan. The film stars Mammootty and Mansi Sharma. The film was released on 17 July 2015 and performed poorly at the box office.

== Cast ==
- Mammootty as Durgaprasad
- Mansi Sharma as Sheethal
- Kishore as DYSP Antony Issac IPS
- Renji Panicker as Chief Minister Thomas Chacko
- Maniyanpilla Raju as SI Soman
- Kunchan as Gopi
- Padmaraj Ratheesh as Muneer
- Saju Navodaya as Police officer
- Sudheer Karamana as Anand
- P. Balachandran as Sir
- Yazir Saleem as Hussain
- Jaise Jose as Saidu
- Abu Salim as Joykuttan
- Chali Pala as Meeshakkaran
- Sethulakshmi as Ammachi
- Shaani Shaki as Anwar
- Hareesh Perumanna as Madanan
- Gokulan as Kamarajan
- Jayakrishnan as Doctor Baburaj
- Moly Kannamaly as Moly
- Sabumon Abdusamad as Michael
- Pauly Valsan as Security man's wife
- Anjali Aneesh as Nurse
- Vivek Gopan as Doctor
- Pradeep Kottayam as CCTV Operator
- Gopalakrishnan as Health Inspector
- Bindu Anish as Antony's wife
- Swaminathan
- Arun
- Hariprashanth MG as Cameraman Dixon

== Soundtrack ==
The film's background score and music is composed by Bijibal with lyrics written by Santhosh Varma.
