= Ben (2015 film) =

Indian film

- Directed by: Vipin Atley
- Written by: Vipin Atley
- Produced by: Sajan K George
- Starring: Gourav Menon; Suraj Venjaramoodu; Anjali Nair
- Cinematography: Hari Nair
- Edited by: Sooraj E. S.
- Music by: Krishna Raj
- Production company: Vibgyor Cinema
- Release date: November 1, 2015
- Running time: 110 minutes
- Country: India
- Language: Malayalam

Ben is a 2015 Malayalam language coming-of-age comedy drama film the, which marks the directorial debut of Vipin Atley. Gourav Menon, Suraj Venjaramoodu, and Anjali Nair in the lead roles. The film is loosely based on several real-life incidents. It draws inspiration from the very real, everyday struggles of children trying to cope with cutthroat schooling environments and the extreme expectations of parents. The narrative emphasizes the need to prioritize a child's mental well-being over academic perfection.

Ben was released in theatres on 1 November 2015. The film received positive reviews from critics and was a commercial success. The film won the National Film Award for Best Child Artist, the Kerala State Film Award for Best Child Artist, and the Kerala State Film Award for Best Character Actress

== Plot ==
Ben (Gourav Menon) is an outdoor-loving, free-spirited boy who is not particularly interested in academics but finds immense joy in the simple countryside life. Ben's mother, Asha (Anjali Nair), has high ambitions for her son. She frequently clashes with the joint family setup, feeling that their relaxed lifestyle and doting relatives are spoiling Ben and hindering his academic progress. Driven by the desire to make Ben a top-tier student, she forces his father, Justin (Suraj Venjaramoodu), to relocate the family into a nuclear household.

Shortly after, Ben is enrolled in an expensive, highly demanding IGCSE (International General Certificate of Secondary Education) school against his wishes. The shift from his joyful, play-oriented village environment to a cutthroat, highly competitive school environment takes a severe toll on him. Ben struggles to fit in, cannot cope with the crushing academic pressure, and begins losing his natural childhood enthusiasm. Obsessed with her social standing and the grades of other children, Asha pushes Ben to his breaking point. Her relentless nagging and unrealistic expectations drive the boy to the brink of a mental breakdown, highlighting the societal pressures and toxic parenting methods that often strip children of a happy childhood.

As Ben's mental condition worsens, the narrative serves as an eye-opener for the parents. It forces Asha and Justin to realize the negative consequences of their pressure, ultimately delivering a poignant message about prioritizing a child's happiness and mental well-being over academic perfection. Ben's world is his family and friends.

== Cast ==
- Gourav Menon as Ben
- Suraj Venjaramoodu as Justin
- Anjali Nair as Asha Justin
- Jibu Jacob as Jibu
- Nirmal Palazhi as Jose
- Rajesh Sharma as Fr. Jose Murikkumpuzha
- Adish Praveen as Chaami
- Baby Nila as Chikuchi
- Anwar Shereef as Aa Chettan
- Varsha Abhay as Tency
- Anjana as Jibu's wife
- Rama Narayanan as Jose's wife
- Paul Jineesh as Joby
- Omana Ouseph as Ammachi
- Munshi Venu as Appachan
- Mohammed Sarthaj as Kochchachan
- Jaya as Anna Kutty
- Roshini as Stace
- Manoj Chamravattom as Paster
- Swathi Mohan as Musaliyar
- Carina Antony as Angela Teacher
- Kashinathan Venjaramoodu as Student
- Nohad Shajahan as Student
- Molly Kannamaly as Kaithotta Ammachi
- Kalabhavan Haneef as Antappan Sir
- Sneha Sreekumar as Tuition Teacher,Bettilda Varghese
- Hareesh Kanaran as Astrologer (cameo appearance)
- Ajmal Ameer as Kochchachan (cameo appearance)
- Aju Varghese as Allen (cameo appearance)
- Master Vishal Krishna as Ben's friend (uncredited)
- Vipin Atley as Narrator (Voice Only)

== Production ==
Ben was filmed over a compact schedule, typically completed in around 25 to 30 days of principal photography. The entire shoot took place on location in Kerala, with the majority of filming set in and around the towns and countryside of Ettumanoor and Pala in the Kottayam district.

== Music ==
The songs and the film score were composed by Krishna Raj and Vipin Atley, The song also written by Vipin Atley.

Track listing
No.	Title	Music	Singer(s)	Length
1.	"Oh Enthu Jeevitham"	Vipin Atley, Krishna Raj	Gourav Menon, Adish Praveen, Leah Anne Philip, Joel	03:37
2.	"Raari Raaro"	Krishna Raj	Justeena, Krishna Raj	03:31

== Release ==
Ben was released in theatres on 1 November 2015, coinciding with Kerala Day weekend.

=== Home Media ===
The digital streaming and satellite rights of the film are acquired by Sun NXT and Surya TV.

== Reception ==
Ben received positive reviews from critics. On the review aggregator website Rotten Tomatoes, 87% of 14 critics' reviews are positive, with an average rating of 7.2/10.

Critics lauded Ben for moving away from typical fairy-tale children’s movies and highlighting the harsh reality of parents placing undue academic and societal pressure on their children. The film served as an eye-opener regarding the Indian education system, urging society to restore the essence of a natural childhood rather than robbing kids of their joy

== Awards ==
- National Film Award for Best Child Artist - Gourav Menon
- Kerala State Film Award for Best Child Artist - Gourav Menon
- Kerala State Film Award for Best Character Actress - Anjali Nair
