= I. Shanmughadas =

Indian writer and film critic

I Shanmughadas
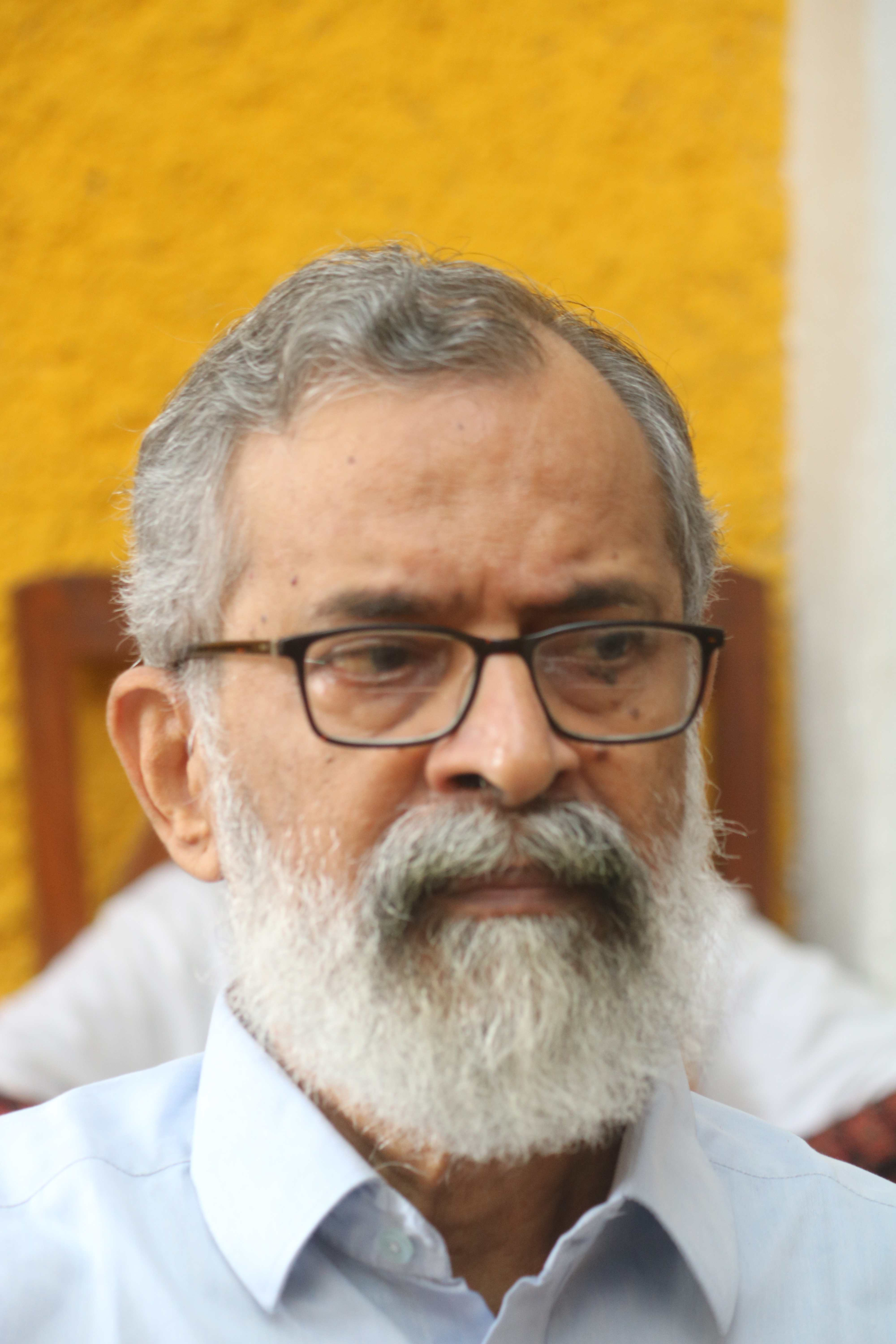
- Born: 4 September 1954 (age 72); Ottappalam, Kerala, India
- Occupations: Film critic, writer, English professor
- Years active: 1970s - present
- Awards: National Film Award, Kerala State Film Award

I. Shanmughadas is a writer and film critic from Kerala, India. He received the National Film Award for Best Film Critic in 1999.

== Education and career ==
He was born in September 1954 in Ottappalam, to Iyyanath Bhanumathy Amma and Paattathil Divakara Menon.

After acquiring a postgraduate degree in English literature, he began his professional life as a teacher in Mumbai. Later, he was a lecturer in English literature in various Government colleges across the state. He retired as professor from Sri C. Achutha Menon Government College, Thrissur. Early associations with film societies inspired him to take an active part in the film society movement and activities. Shanmughadas started writing articles on cinema in the latter half of the 1970s.

== Recognition ==
He received the National Award for the best film critic in 1999. Sanchariyude Veedu, a book on the films of Satyajit Ray, won the State award for the best book on cinema in 1996. "Daivanarthakante Krodham", his article on M.T Vasudevan Nair's Nirmalyam, won him the State Award for the best article written on films of the year 2013.

He is the recipient of Kerala Sahitya Akademi’s Vilasini Puraskaram for the best literary criticism for his book Shareeram Nadhi Nakhathram on The God of Small Things, G.N Pilla Endowment Award for the best academic article (2008), Kozhikodan Award for the best book on cinema (2012) and Film Critic's Association's Awards for the best book on cinema of the years 1997 and 2006 as well.

In 2022 Shanmughadas received Satyajit Ray Memorial Award instituted by FIPRESCI-India (International Federation of Film Critics).

== Published works ==
- Malakalil Manju Peyyunnu
- Cinemayude Vazhiyil
- Sanchariyude Veedu
- Aaranu Buddhanallaathathu
- Godard: Colaykkum Marxinum Naduvil
- P. Ramadas: Vidyarthiyude Vazhi
- Cinemayum Chila Samvidhayakarum
- Shareeram Nadi Nakshathram
