= Homely Meals =

- Film poster
- Directed by: Anoop Kannan
- Written by: Vipin Atley
- Produced by: Hussain; Illias Zakkariya
- Starring: Vipin Atley; Rajesh Sharma; Neeraj Madhav; Srinda Ashab
- Cinematography: Georgy Joseph
- Edited by: Babu Ratnam
- Music by: Sartaj; Bijibal
- Production company: Recard Pictures
- Distributed by: LJ Films
- Release date: 3 October 2014 (Kerala)
- Running time: 142 minutes
- Country: India
- Language: Malayalam

Homely Meals is a 2014 Indian Malayalam-language comedy drama film written by Vipin Atley and directed by Anoop Kannan (who previously directed Jawan of Vellimala), starring Vipin Atley, Rajesh Sharma, Neeraj Madhav, and Srinda Ashab. The film received positive reviews upon release. It was appreciated for its novel theme, directorial value, and technical expertise.

== Plot ==
Homely Meals is about the journey of Alan, an odd-looking youngster who is crazy about films and wants to make a mark in the visual media with aid from his rowdy friends. However, his dream is stumbled upon by his former friends, Sajith and Sharath Chandran, Sajith's mentor, who had previously helped Sajith steal credit for Alan's show.

== Cast ==
- Vipin Atley as Alan
- Srinda Ashab as Nanditha
- Rajesh Sharma as Palarivattam Mosappan
- Neeraj Madhav as Arun
- Shreerej as Praveen
- Thommy as Dicrooze
- Jain Paul as Sree Sankar
- Basil Joseph as Pottan Basil
- Sharafudheen as Chandrappan, Dubbing Engineer
- Manoj K. Jayan as Sarath Chandran
- Nedumudi Venu as Father Dickson
- Kailash as Sajith Ram
- Sabitha Anand as Alan's mother
- Sreelatha Namboothiri as Alan's grandmother
- Babu Antony as himself
- Sunil Sukhada as Parameswaran Nair
- Sudheer Karamana as Surendran, Arun's father
- Sasi Kalinga as Chacko Chettan
- Sreejith Ravi as Sajan, Bike passenger
- Anil Murali as CI Karthikeyan
- Joju George as Raghavan, Program Director
- Shivaji Guruvayoor as Roy Peter
- Vaishak Uthaman as a man in BAR
- Dinesh Prabhakar as Lalan
- Moly Kannamaly as Mary
- Anwar Shereef as Bacchu
- Majeed as Bishop Mar Basselius Cornelius
- Gourav Menon as Sanju, Arun's brother
- Malini Sivaraman as the girl in the cycle
- Balaji Sharma as cameraman

== Reception ==
Paresh C Palicha of Rediff.com rated the film and wrote, "Homely Meals is watchable for its earnest performances." Deepa Soman of The Times of India gave a rating and said, "It's through comedy that the film scores most of its brownie points. The actors, many of them new, have gotten under the skin of their characters. Overall, the film does not disappoint and definitely is a one-time watch."
