= O. V. Vijayan Literary Award =

Malayalam literary award

O. V. Vijayan Sahitya Puraskaram
- Award for individual contributions to Malayalam literature
- Awarded for: Literary award in India
- Sponsored by: Naveena Samskarika Kala Kendram, Hyderabad
- Rewards: ₹50,000, citation, memento designed by Kanayi Kunhiraman
- First award: 2011
- Final award: 2019

Highlights
- Total awarded: 9
- First winner: Sarah Joseph
- Last winner: P. F. Mathews
- Website: nskk.in/home

The O. V. Vijayan Sahitya Puraskaram or O. V. Vijayan Literary Award is an annual award instituted by the Naveena Samskarika Kala Kendram, Hyderabad, in memory of Malayalam novelist and cartoonist O. V. Vijayan who had spent his last days in Secunderabad. The award consists of a cash purse of ₹50,001, a memento by Kanayi Kunhiraman, and a citation. It recognizes to the best book in Malayalam language during the year.

== Recipients ==
Year	Recipient	Work	Category	Ref.
2011	Sarah Joseph	Ooru Kaval	Novel	
2012	Zacharia	Alfonsammayude Maranavum Shavasamskaravum	Collection of short stories	
2013	Vijayalakshmi	Vijayalakshmiyude Kavithakal	Collection of poems	
2014	B. Rajeevan	Vakkukalum Vasthukkalum	Collection of essays	
2015	Ushakumari	Chithirapurathe Janaki	Novel	
2016	Chandramathi	Rathnakarante Bharya	Collection of short stories	
2017	Lopa R.	Vaikkolpava	Collection of poems	
2018	C. S. Meenakshi	Bhoumachapam - Indian Bhoopatanirmanathinte Vismayacharithram	Non-fiction	
2019	Karunakaran	Yuvavayirunna Onpathu Varsham	Novel	
2022	P. F. Mathews	Muzhakkam	Novel	
2023	Kuzhur Wilson	Innu Njan Nale Neeyantappan	Collection of poems	

== See also ==
- List of Malayalam literary awards
