= Vipin Atley =

Indian film director, writer and actor

- Citizenship: Indian
- Occupations: Director; Actor; Writer
- Years active: 2014—present

Vipin Atley is an Indian director, actor and writer who works in the Malayalam film industry. He is best known for his role in the Homely Meals (2014) for which he played the lead role and wrote the script. Atley made his directorial debut in 2015 with Ben. Musical Chair (2021) written and directed by him has won the award for the best film at the 2021 IFFK.

== Accolades ==
Year	Award	Category	Work	Result	Notes	Ref.
2021	IFFK	Best Malayalam Film	Musical Chair	Won	NETPAC (Note: Network for the Promotion of Asian Cinema (NETPAC). Introduced in 2007. Also Known as NETPAC Awards)	

== Filmography ==
=== As director and writer ===
Year	Title	Credits		Notes	Ref.
Year	Title	Director	Writer	Notes	Ref.
2015	Ben	Yes	Yes		
2019	Vattamesha Sammelenam	Yes	Yes		
2020	Musical Chair	Yes	Yes		
2024	Antappante Athbudha Pravarthikal	Yes	Yes		
2024	Pombalai Orumai	Yes	Yes		

=== As actor ===
Year	Title	Role	Notes	Ref.
2007	Pranayakalam	Ranjith's friend		
2014	Homely Meals	Allen		
2019	Vattamesha Sammelenam			
2020	Musical Chair	Marty		
2022	Nanpakal Nerathu Mayakkam	Tomy		
2024	Antappante Athbudha Pravarthikal	Antappan		
2024	Pombalai Orumai	Sub Inspector		
