= C. S. Meenakshi =

Indian engineer and writer (born 1962)

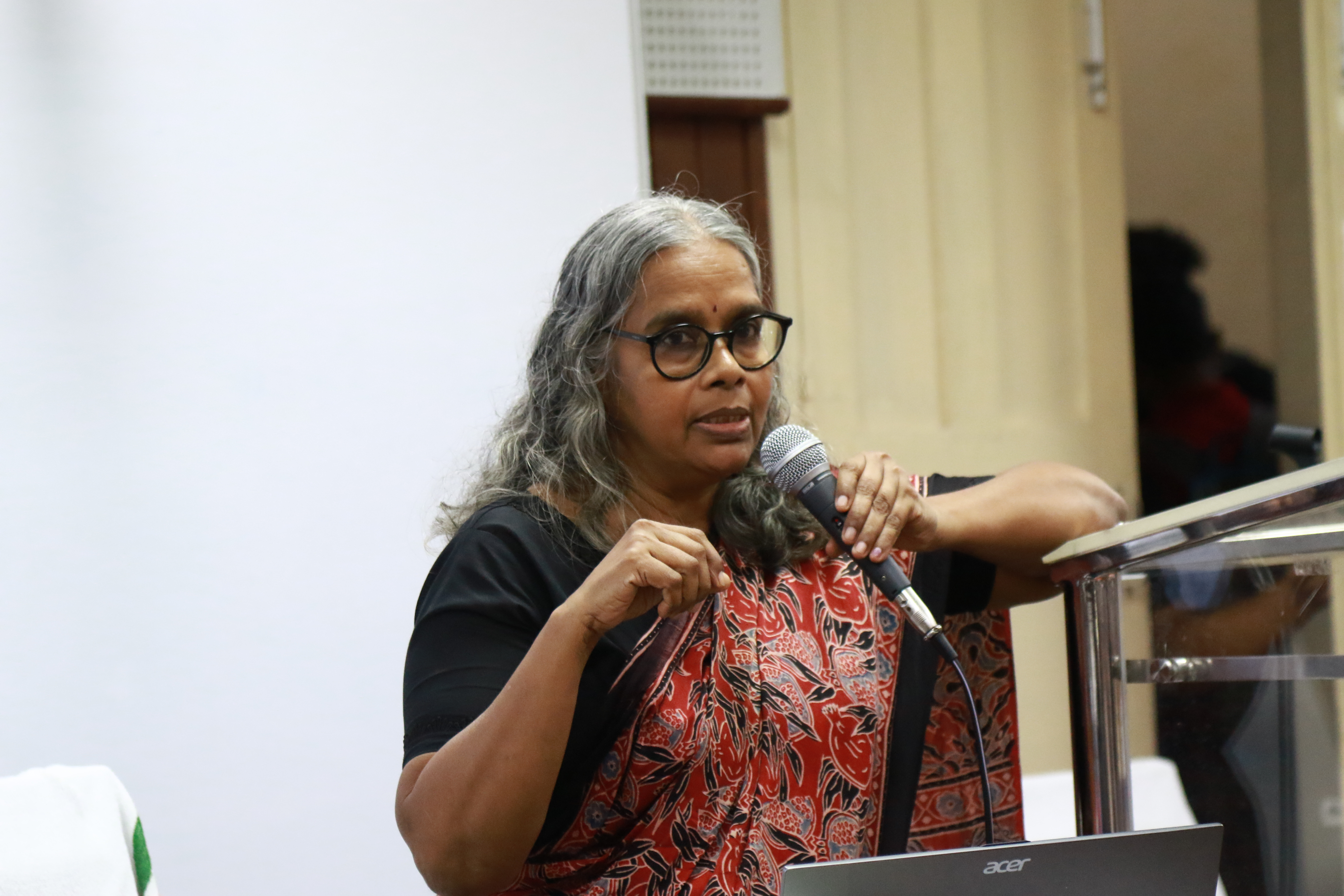
- Born: 28 March 1962 (age 64); Kozhikode, Kerala
- Education: Government Engineering College, Thrissur
- Occupations: Engineer, writer and public speaker
- Spouse: Ajith Kumar
- Writing career
- Notable works: Bhaumachapam- Indian Bhoopada nirmmanatthinte vismaya charithra; Penpattu Tarakal- Malayala Chalachitra Ganangalile Pennavishkarangal
- Notable awards: G.N. Pillai Award, given by the Kerala Sahitya Akademi; Kerala State Film Award for Best Book on Cinema; O. V. Vijayan Literary Award

C. S. Meenakshi is an Indian engineer, writer and public speaker from Kozhikode, Kerala. She has received several awards including the G.N. Pillai Award that was given by the Kerala Sahitya Akademi, the O. V. Vijayan Literary Award, the Kerala Science and Technology Council's Popular Writing Award, the Kerala Film Critics Association's Mannarakkayam Baby Award for Best Film Book, and the Kerala State Film Award for Best Book on Cinema.

== Biography ==
C. S. Meenakshi C.S. was born on 28th March 1962. She is a native of Kozhikode. After completing degree in Civil engineering from Government Engineering College, Thrissur, she worked in Neyveli Lignite Corporation, Kerala Industrial Infrastructure Development Corporation, Kerala Water Authority and retired from the Kerala Local Self Government Department as the Executive Engineer.

=== Personal life ===
Meenakshi is married to Ajith Kumar, a retired superintending engineer from the Irrigation Department, poet and documentary director.

== Literary contributions ==
Bhaumachapam- Indian Bhoopada nirmmanatthinte vismaya charithram [Meaning:The Arc of the Earth - The Amazing History of Indian Mapmaking] written by Meenakshi is a scholarly book that tells the history of the Great Trigonometrical Survey, which was conducted in India from 1802 to 1871. The book by Meenakshi, a civil engineer, has been foreword by Anand, a writer and civil engineer. The book has six chapters. The first two chapters discuss various topics such as the history of the survey, the colonial interests behind the survey, and how the survey helped the British occupation. The third chapter discusses the various surveys conducted by the British till then, such as the Revenue Survey, Topographical Survey, Leveling Survey, and Irrigation Survey. The fourth chapter explains the scientific aspects of the GTS, the interesting experiences related to the survey, and the difficulties the survey team had to overcome. The fifth chapter is about the survey team's journeys across the various terrains of the subcontinent, the various mountains and rivers in these places, the shortcuts used to conduct the survey in inhospitable places, the journeys, routes, and challenges they faced, including the foreigners and the locals they appointed. Chapter 6 depicts the Indians in this British survey and how the survey was viewed by ordinary people in India (fears, superstitions, and defenses).

Meenakshi's Penpattu Tarakal- Malayala Chalachitra Ganangalile Pennavishkarangal [meaning: Paths of Female Singers-How women are mentioned in Malayalam flim songs], which meticulously analyzes the role of women in the Malayalam film and music industry, also deals with various streams of music, history of songs, interventions of classical music, singing styles, and dominant tendencies along with the history of Malayalam film singers from the old generation to the new generation.

The book Penpattu Tarakal is divided into three sections: Uravakal, Pennuruvakal, and Uriyadal. In the first section, Uravakal, the author explains how gender roles work in music. In this, the author argues with reason that from the Puranas to the philosophers and social reformers known in Kerala history, women have been objectified. In the second chapter of Uravakal, discussions about women's participation in non-cinematic music genres in Kerala come to the fore.

The second and main part, Pennuruvangal, examines the cultural history of Malayalam film songs spanning eight and a half decades, chronologically. The third part, Uriyadalal, deals with the marginalization and misadventures of female artists in the music industry. It also includes an interview with Vimala B. Varma, the singer from Nirmala, the first Malayalam film to feature a playback song, followed by detailed notes on important female singers in the history of Malayalam film songs.

Her third book, Anpenthiya Villali, about poet and lyricist P. Bhaskaran, was released in 2025.

== Acting career ==
Meenakshi played the role of a teacher in 'Bhagyalakshmi', directed by Sajinlal, with journalist Babu Velappay's story and screenplay written.

== Awards and honors ==
In 2019, Meenakshi received the G.N. Pillai Award that is given by the Kerala Sahitya Akademi for the second-place work in the non-fiction category for her work Bhaumachapam- Indian Bhoopada nirmmanatthinte vismaya charithram. This book also received the Kerala Science and Technology Council's Popular Writing Award, and the O. V. Vijayan Literary Award. Her book titled, Penpattu Tharakal - Malayala Chalachitra Ganangalile Pennavishkarangal, received the Satyajit Ray Film Society Award, and the Kerala Film Critics Association's Mannarakkayam Baby Award for Best Film Book of 2024. In 2024, her book Penpattu Tharakal, received the Kerala State Film Award for Best Book on Cinema.
