= Kerala State Film Award for Best Character Actress =

Annual Indian film award

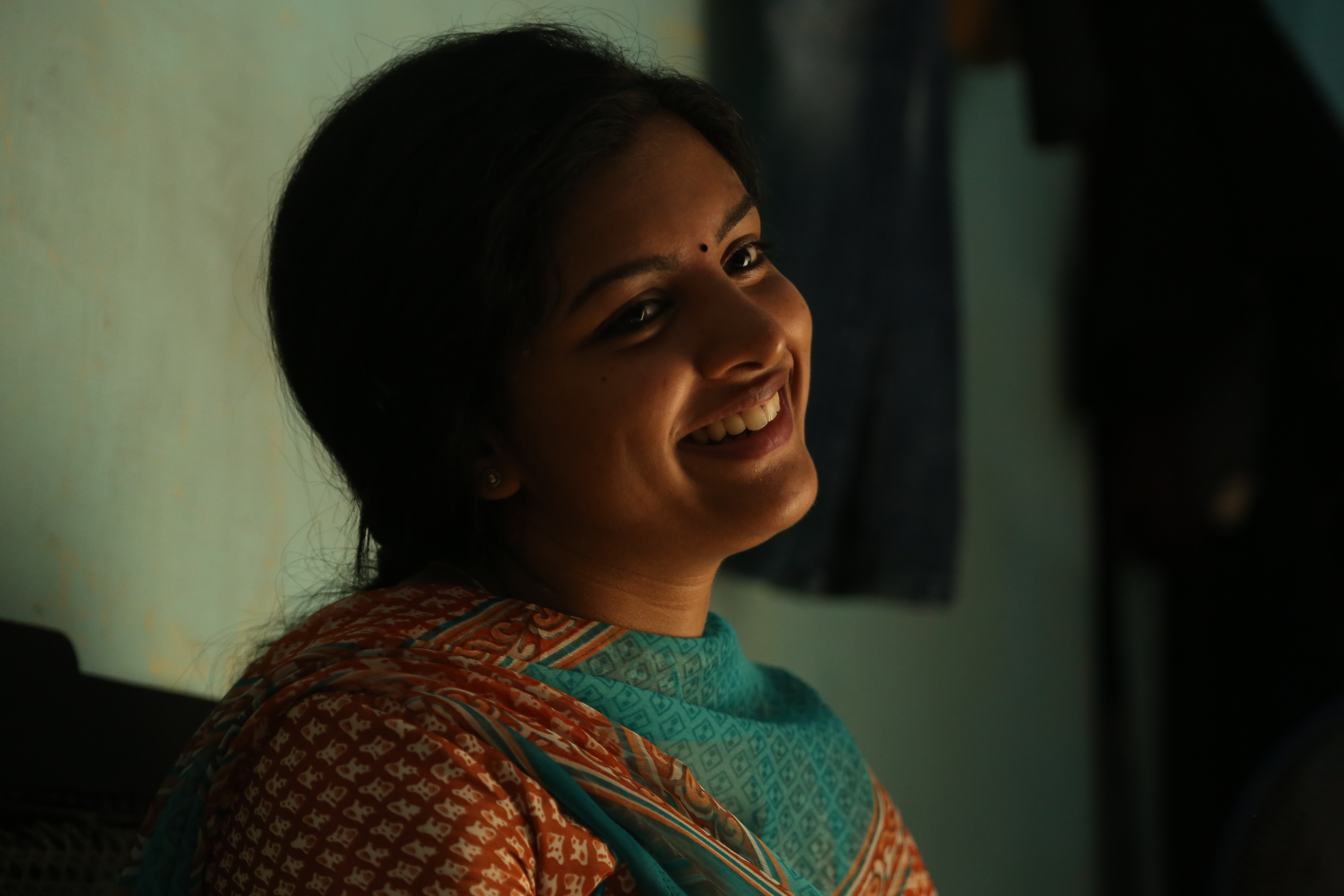
- Lijomol Jose, the latest winner at the 55th Kerala State Film Awards
- Awarded for: Best performance by an actress in a Malayalam film
- Sponsored by: Kerala State Chalachitra Academy
- Reward: ₹50,000 (US$530)
- First award: 2015
- Final award: 2024
- Most recent winner: Lijomol Jose

Highlights
- Total awarded: 9
- First winner: Anjali Nair

The Kerala State Film Award for Best Character Actress is an award, begun in 2015, presented annually at the Kerala State Film Awards of India to an actress for her performance in a Malayalam film. It replaced the Kerala State Film Award for Second Best Actress, which was discontinued in 2014. The winner receives a certificate, a statuette and a cash prize of ₹50,000.

== Winners ==
Year	Actor	Film	Ref.
2015	Anjali Nair	Ben	
2016	Kanchana P. K.	Olappeeppi	
2017	Pauly Valsan	Ee.Ma.Yau. Ottamuri Velicham	
2018	Savithri Sreedharan	Sudani from Nigeria	
2018	Sarasa Balussery	Sudani from Nigeria	
2019	Swasika	Vasanthi	
2020	Sreerekha	Veyil	
2021	Unnimaya Prasad	Joji	
2022	Devi Varma	Saudi Vellakka	
2023	Sreeshma Chandran	Pombalai Orumai	
2024	Lijomol Jose	Nadanna Sambhavam	

== See also ==
- Kerala State Film Award for Best Character Actor
