= N. P. Sajeesh =

Indian journalist (born 1976)

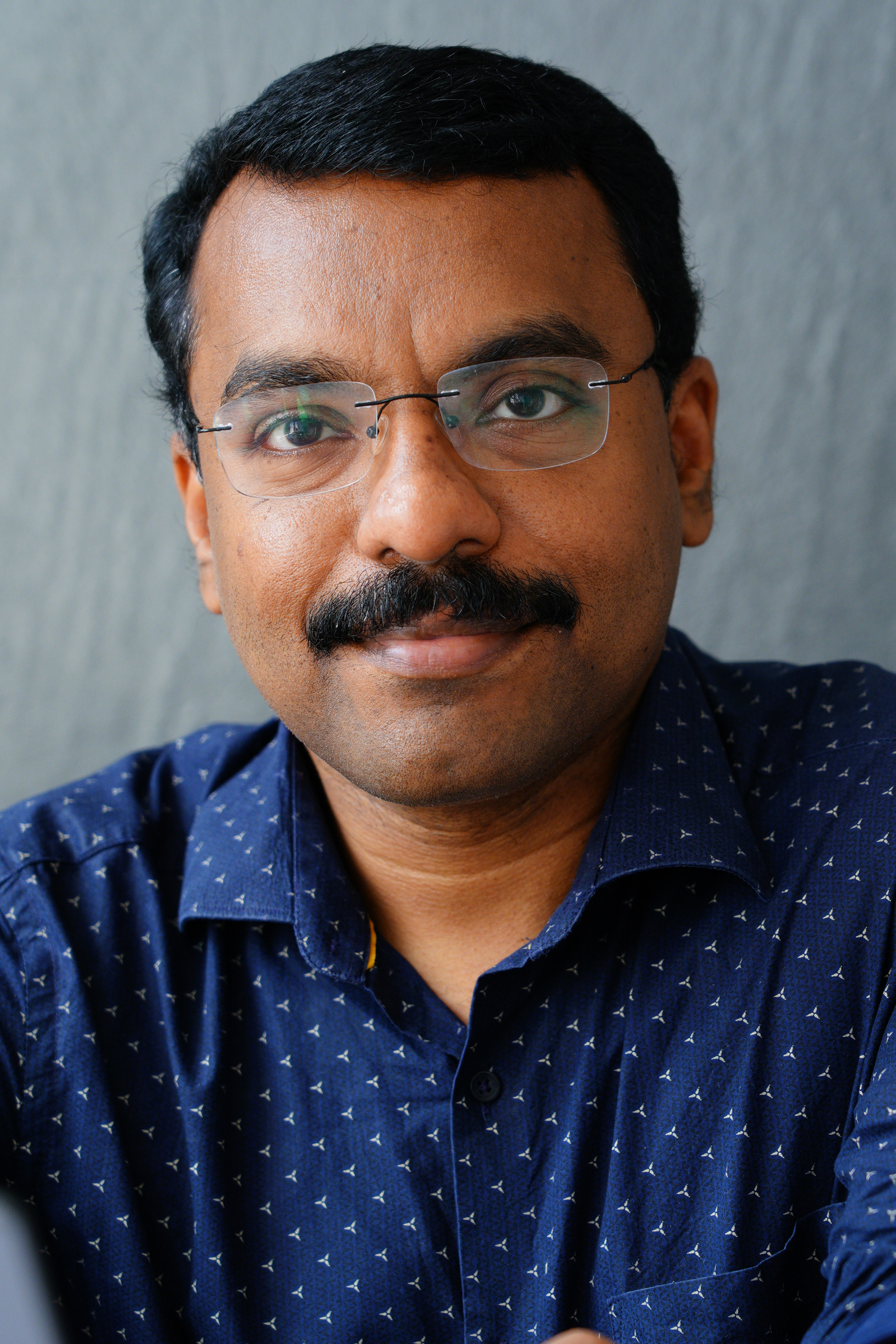
- N P Sajeesh in 2022

N.P Sajeesh (born 7 December 1976) is a writer, journalist and film critic. Currently he serves as the Deputy Director (Programmes) at Kerala State Chalachitra Academy

== Life ==
Sajeesh was born at Kalpathur near Perambra in Kozhikode district of Kerala State, India. Authoring several books on literature and cinema, He won Kerala State Film Award for the best book in cinema in 2007 for the book Salabhachirakukal Kozhiyunna Charithra Sishirathil. He won Kerala State Film Award for the best article on cinema in 2006 for the article titled Gujarathinu sesham Malayala cinema Musliminodu parayunnathu published in Mathrubhumi Weekly.

In 2008 he served on the Kerala State Film Award Jury headed by Vijayakrishnan.

He received the ALA (Amateur Little Cinema) Award for the best translated work on cinema for the book titled Sahasrabdathinte Cinemakal published by Frames Film Society.

He has published three collections of essays on cinema.

Thiramalayalathinte Avasthantharangal, published by Keralabhasha Institute, is a collection of essays on different genres of Malayalam Cinema.

The book Salabhachirakukal Kozhiyunna Charithra Sishirathil, is published by H&C Publishers. He has compiled and edited Purushaveshangal, a collection of essays on Mammootty and Mohanlal.

Veettilekkulla Kathukal is about Sylvia Plath, an American poet.

He is the co-author of the books titled Athmahathya: Jeevitham kondu Murivettavante Vakku and Unmadam: abodhathinte Maholtsavam which probe the connection between suicide, madness and creativity.

He is sub editor with Madhyamam Weekly. He has been with Madhyamam for almost eight years and has been writing features and articles on a wide range of subjects such as cinema, literature, politics and information technology.
