= Bipin Chandran =

Indian script writer

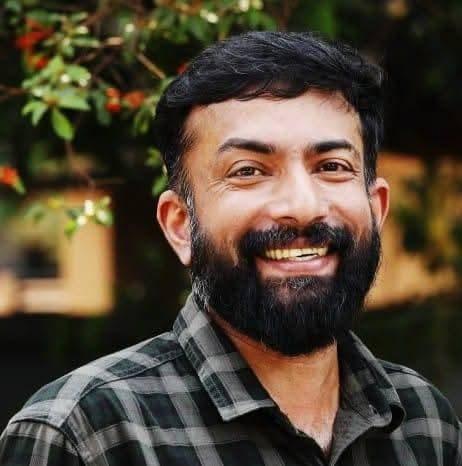
- Born: Ponkunnam, Kottayam, Kerala, India
- Other name: Bindran
- Education: St. Berchmans College Changanacherry, Maharajas College, Eranakulam
- Occupations: Writer, Screenwriter, Actor
- Years active: 2009-present
- Notable work: 1983 and Paavada
- Awards: Kerala State Film Award for Best Article on Cinema

Bipin Chandran is and Indian writer, screenwriter, and actor. His first movie as a screenwriter was Daddy Cool.

== Personal life ==
Chandran was born in Ponkunnam, Kerala. He attended St. Berchmans College in Changanacherry, where he met Martin Prakkat. He later pursued higher studies at Maharaja's College, Ernakulam, where he participated in cultural activities and served as the College Arts Club Secretary during the 1990s.

== Career ==
As an author, Chandran has written books including "Mammootty: Kazhchayum Vayanayum", an anthology of memoirs, interviews, and essays about the cinematic journey of the actor Mammootty. His other books includes "Kriyaathmaka Jeevithathilekku Pathu Chuvadukal", (translation of Windy Dryden's "10 Steps to Creative Living"), "Best Actor Screenplay", "Maayude Kathukal", "Ormayundo ee mukham", "Kappithante Barya", "Irattachanku", "Chithrajivithangal", "Mahanadan", "Armadachandran" and "Chandrahasam."

Bipin Chandran also penned the columns in online magazines.

He has acted in minor roles in few Malayalam films. In 2019, he received Kerala State Film Award for Best Article on Cinema for his articles "Komali Melkkai Nedunna Kaalam" and "Madambilliyile Manorogi".

== As screenwriter ==
Year	Film	Director	Notes
2009	Daddy Cool	Aashiq Abu	Dialogues only
2010	Best Actor	Martin Prakkat	Debut film as writer
2013	Buddy	Raj Prabavathy Menon	Dialogues
2013	ABCD	Martin Prakkat	Creative contribution
2014	1983	Abrid Shine	Screenplay
2014	Samsaaram Aarogyathinu Haanikaram	Balaji Mohan	Dialogues
2016	Paavada	G. Marthandan	Story & Screenplay
2016	King Liar	Lal	Dialogues only
2017	C/O Saira Banu	Antony Sony	Screenplay
2022	Cobra	R. Ajay Gnanamuthu	Malayalam Dialogues
