= Beena R. Chandran =

Indian actress and theatre artist

- Born: Beena R. Chandran
- Occupations: Actress, theatre artist, teacher
- Years active: 2020–present
- Known for: Thadavu
- Awards: Kerala State Film Award for Best Actress (2024)

Beena R. Chandran is an Indian actress and theatre artist who works in Malayalam film industry. She received the Kerala State Film Award for Best Actress in 2024 for her performance in the film Thadavu. In addition to her acting career, she is also a school teacher and a trained theatre performer.

== Early life and background ==
Beena R. Chandran worked as a school teacher in Kerala before entering professional cinema. She began performing in theatre, which laid the foundation for her acting career.

== Career ==
Beena made her breakthrough in Malayalam cinema with the film Thadavu (2024). Her performance was widely praised for its realism and emotional depth, earning her the Kerala State Film Award for Best Actress.

In addition to films, she continues to participate in theatre performances in Kerala.

== Awards ==
Year	Award	Category	Recipient	Result	Notes	Ref.
2024	Kerala State Film Awards	Best Actress	Thadavu	Won	Shared with Urvashi	

== Filmography ==
=== Films ===
Year	Title	Role	Notes	Ref.
2025	Thadavu	Geetha	Won Kerala State Film Awards for Best Actress	
2026	I, Nobody	Molly		
