= Mansi Sharma =

Indian actress and model

- Born: 16 March 1989 (age 37); Bijnor, Uttar Pradesh, India
- Occupations: Actor; model
- Known for: Choti Sarrdaarni; Mahabharat
- Spouse: Yuvraj Hans (m. 2019)
- Children: 2
- Relatives: Hans Raj Hans (father-in law)

Mansi Sharma (born 16 March 1985) is an Indian actress, entrepreneur and model who has appeared in Ginny Weds Sunny, Begum Jaan, Amaanat and few other Hindi films.

== Personal life ==
Mansi and Yuvraaj Hans got married on February 21, 2019, in Jalandhar, Punjab. They first met during a Box Cricket League and started dating subsequently. Their first son was born in 2020. Mansi moved Chandigarh in 2022. On 16 September 2023, Mansi had her second child with Yuvraj Hans at a private nursing home in Chandigarh.

== Early life ==
Mansi wanted to be an actor since she was a kid. After finishing college, she went to acting classes in Delhi and auditioned for many roles. She also did theater to gain experience before starting her career in movies.

== Career ==
During the COVID-19 pandemic, Mansi and Ritika Sharma started a cosmetic brand known as Boddess Beauty.

== Filmography ==
=== Film ===
Year	Title	Role	Language	Notes	Ref.
2015	Acha Dhin	Sheetal	Malayalam		
2017	Begum Jaan	Girl in Bus	Hindi		
2017	Halwa		Hindi	Short film	
2019	Amaanat	Lover Bride	Punjabi		
2020	Ginny Weds Sunny	Manpreet	Hindi		
2020	Brij Mohan Amar Rahe	Customer one	Hindi		

=== Television ===
Year	Title	Role	Notes
2012	Aasman Se Aage	Sandhya	
2012–2013	C.I.D.	Shimona	Episode 846
2012–2013	C.I.D.	Reena	Episode 882
2012–2013	C.I.D.	Radhika	Episode 903
2013	Devon Ke Dev...Mahadev	Indrani	
2013–2014	Mahabharat	Ambalika	
2013–2014	Pavitra Rishta	Neena Sachin Deshmukh	
2014	Uttaran	Saba	
2015–2016	Pyaar Ko Ho Jaane Do	Trisha Hooda	
2016	Yeh Kahan Aa Gaye Hum	Yaamini Pilgaonkar	
2016–2017	Chandra Nandini	Maharani Avantika	
2018	Manmohini	Village Girl	
2018	Mariam Khan - Reporting Live	Aayat Khan	
2018	Vikram Betaal Ki Rahasya Gatha	Queen Bhanumati	
2019	Patiala Babes	Parlour Girl	
2019; 2021–2022	Choti Sarrdaarni	Harleen Kaur Gill	
2022	Swaran Ghar	Rajeshwari Deol	
2024	Punjabi Dance Punjabi	Herself	
2024	Badall Pe Paon Hai	Shilpa Khanna	
2025	Badi Haveli Ki Chhoti Thakurain	Tapasya	
