= Vijayakrishnan =

Indian film critic and director

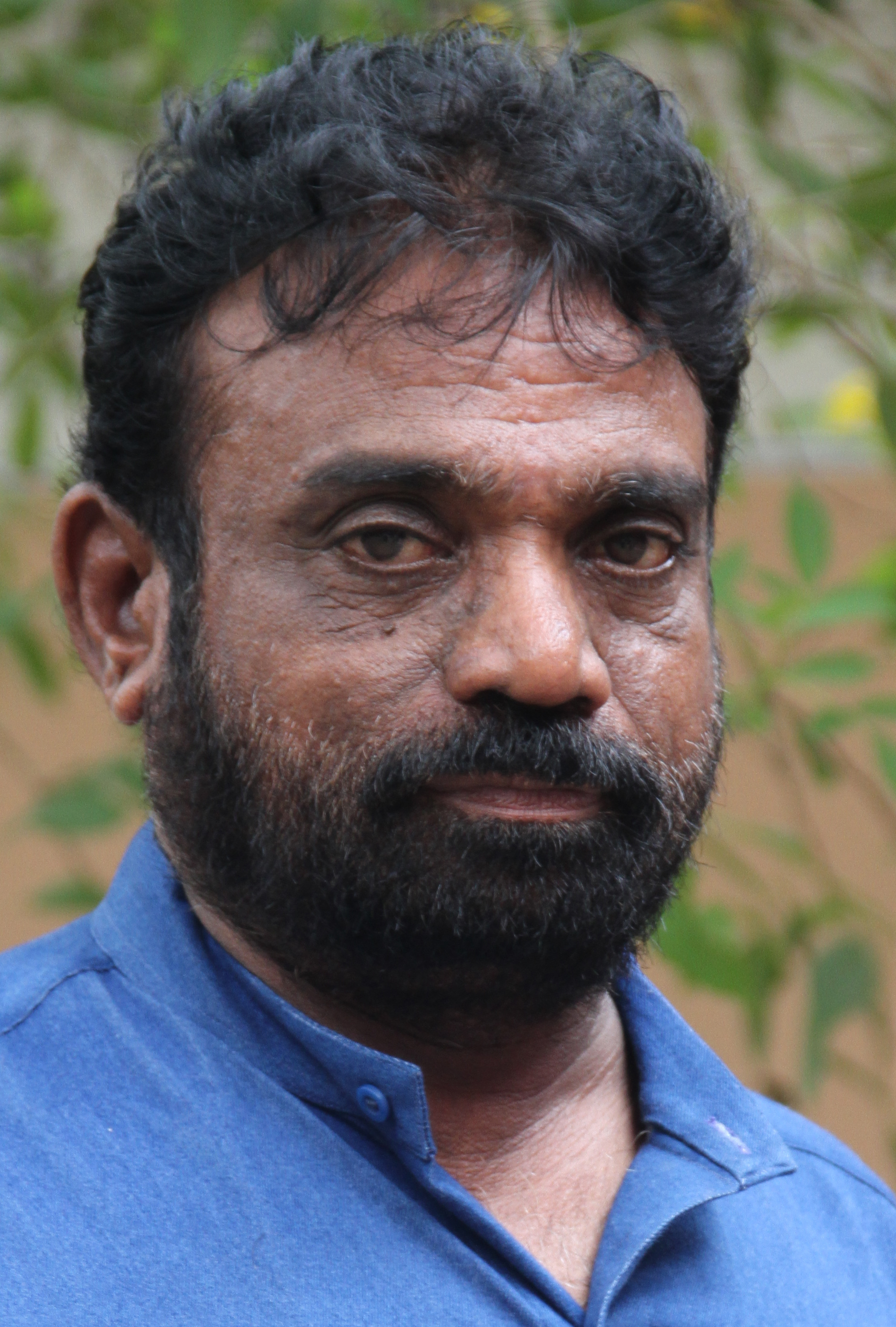
- Born: 5 November 1952 (age 73); Thiruvananthapuram, India
- Occupations: Film director, writer, film critic, film historian
- Years active: 1975–present
- Spouse: Asha S.P (1985–present )
- Children: Sruti Vijayakrishnan, Yadu Vijayakrishnan
- Website: vijayakrishnan.com

Vijayakrishnan is an Indian film critic, film historian and director born in 1952 in Thiruvananthapuram, Kerala He has received eight State Awards, one National Award, and two Critics Awards.

== Committee member ==
Vijayakrishnan was a member of the Kerala State Film Award Committee and National Award Committee on multiple occasions. He was also a member of the Indian Panorama Selection Committee for Filmotsav 1986. Vijayakrishna served as a member of the Indian Central Board for Film Certification for 8 years, Bharatiya Vidya Bhavan, and former Director Board Member of Kerala State Film Development Corporation. He was also a member of the Board of Studies in Thunchath Ezhuthachan Malayalam University. Presently, he is the Chairman of Padmarajan Trust.

== Awards ==
Year	Award	Category	Nominated work
1982	National Film Awards	Best Book on Cinema	Chalachitra Sameeksha
1984	Kerala State Film Award	Best Book on Cinema	Chalachitrathinte Porul
1985	Kerala State Film Award	Best Book on Cinema	Marunna Prathichhayakal
1986	Kerala State Film Award	Best Book on Cinema	Karuppum Veluppum Varnangalum
1989	Film Critics Award	Best Children's Film	Kamandalu
1991	Kerala State Film Award	Best Book on Cinema	Kaalathil Kothiya Silpangal
1991	Kerala State Award	Best TV Programme for Children	Oridathorikal
1992	Kerala State TV Awards	Special Jury Award	Kathasamgamom
1995	Rotary Award	Outstanding Contribution in Literature	
1995	Nana Miniscreen Award	Best Director of TV Serial	
1995	State Children's Literature Institute Award	Best Children's Novel	Bhoothathan Kunnu
1998	Challenge Foundation Award	Best TV Serial Director	
1998	State TV Awards	Special Jury Award	Pattolaponnu
1998	Madhyama Patana Kendram Awards	Second Best Serial	Pattolaponnu
2000	Thirumanas Award	Total Contribution for TV Medium	
2000	Soma Award	Special Jury Award	Tharattu
2000	Mayoora Award	Outstanding Contribution for TV	
2000	Solar Award	Outstanding Contribution for TV	
2005	Kerala State Film Award	Best Article on Cinema	Classicukal comalinadakangalakunnathu
2011	Kozhikkodan Award	Best Book on Cinema	Tirakatayum Cinemayum
2012	Kerala State TV Awards	Best Anchor for Education Program	Chitrasala
2013	Kerala State Film Award	Best Book on Cinema	Indian Cinemayude 100 Varshangal
2014	Atlas TV Critics Award	Best Documentary Director	Indian Cinema @ 100
2015	Vayalar Rama Varma Samskarika Vedi Awards	Best Television Program	Aayiram Paadasarangal
2016	Jeycee Foundation Awards	Best Television Anchor	Aayiram Paadasarangal
2018	Kerala Film Critics Award	Best Children's Film	Ilakal Pacha Pookkal Manja
2020	P. Kesavadev Literary Award	Literature	Overall contribution

== Books ==
Fiction:-

1. Saarthavahakasanghom
2. Anuyay
3. Brahmapurathekkulla vandi
4. Mruthyuvinte mukham
5. Thamasinte kannukal
6. Padayottom
7. Naalamathe salabanjika
8. Chirukantanum yakshirmarum
9. Nidhi
10. Shakespearum meenkariyum
11. Vijayakrishnante laghunovelukal
12. Kizhavanmarthandante Kuthira
13. Samayaratham
14. Paloramathayude Pasu

On film:-

1. Kaalathil kothiya silpangal
2. Nerinu nere pidicha kannadi
3. Malayala cinemayude katha
4. Karuppum veluppum varnangalum
5. Marunna prathichhayakal
6. Chalachitrasameeksha
7. Chalachitrathinte porul
8. Lokacinema
9. Satyajit rayyude lokam
10. Malayala cinema
11. Chalachitravum yatharthyavum
12. Viswothara thirakkathakal
13. Malayala cinemayile madhavam
14. Malayala cinemayile mathru sannidhyam
15. Vathilppurakkazhchakal
16. Marakkanavatha malayala cinemakal
17. Chitrasala
18. Thirakkathayum Cinemayum
19. Luis Buñuel
20. Indian Cinemayude 100 Varshangal
21. Hollywood muthal Kim-ki-duk vare
22. Indian Cinema : 101 varshangal 101 Chitrangal
23. Rajyabhrashtanaya Marthanda Varma

Literary criticism:-

1. Iruttil urangathirikkunna oral

Children's literature:-

1. Kamandalu
2. Boothathan kunnu

== Filmography ==
Year	Title	Category	Notes
1986	Nidhiyude Katha	Feature film	Director
1987	Padmanabhapuram Palace	Documentary	
1988	Oru Maram Pala Thamasakkar	Documentary	
1988	Mahabali	Documentary	
1989	Kamandalu	Children's film	
1990	Arivinte Vazhi	Documentary	
1990	Ganasudha	Documentary	
1990	Oridathorikkal	TV serial	
1992	Sivamahimayude Raatri	Tele film	
1992	Kathasamgamom	TV serial	
1993	Perunnal Varunnu	Tele film	
1993	Nikshepam	Tele film	
1994	Thoolikayum Camerayum	Documentary	
1994	Anaathar, Sanaathar	Tele film	
1994	Gana Tharangini	Documentary	
1994	Prayaschitham	Tele film	
1994	Manthrikante Pravu	Children's film	
1994	Alambum	Tele film	
1994	Virunninu Mumpu	Tele film	
1994	Ullathu paranjal uriyu......	Tele film	
1994	Varnachirakukal	Tele film	
1994	Thudakkam	Tele film	
1994	Rithubhedangal	Tele film	
1995	Chamayam	TV serial	
1995	Malathi Menon	Tele film	
1996	Mayooranritham	Feature film	Director
1996	Take 4 OK	TV serial	
1998	Mookkuthiyum Manchadiyum	TV serial	
1998	Pattola Ponnu	TV serial	
1999	Preyasi	TV serial	
1999	Thooval Kireedom	TV serial	
1999	Onnam thumbiyam onathampuranum	Tele film	
1999	Pisachinte Kuppayam	Tele film	
2000	Panthirukulam	TV serial	
2000	Tharattu	TV serial	
2001	Kudumbavilakku	TV serial	
2001	Agnikireedom	TV serial	
2002	Vijanaveethi	TV serial	
2002	Ramayanam	Tele film	
2004	Keralam Vaana Rajavamsangal	Documentary	
2004	Pranayam	TV serial	
2005	Thakazhi	Documentary	
2005	Illam nira vallam nira	Tele film	
2005	Kudumbasametham	TV serial	
2005	Nakshathrakannukal	Tele film	
2006	Vazhanoolmala	Tele film	
2006	Sivakamikkunnile Nakshatrangal	Tele film	
2009	Dalamarmarangal	Feature film	Director
2011	Umma	Feature film	
2013-14	Indian Cinemayude 100 Varshangal	TV Program	
2014-16	Aayiram Paadasarangal	TV Program	
2017	Kaviyude Osyath	Feature Film	Screenplay & Executive Producer
2018	Ilakal Pacha Pookkal Manja	Feature Film	

== See also ==
- List of Indian writers
