= San Jaimt =

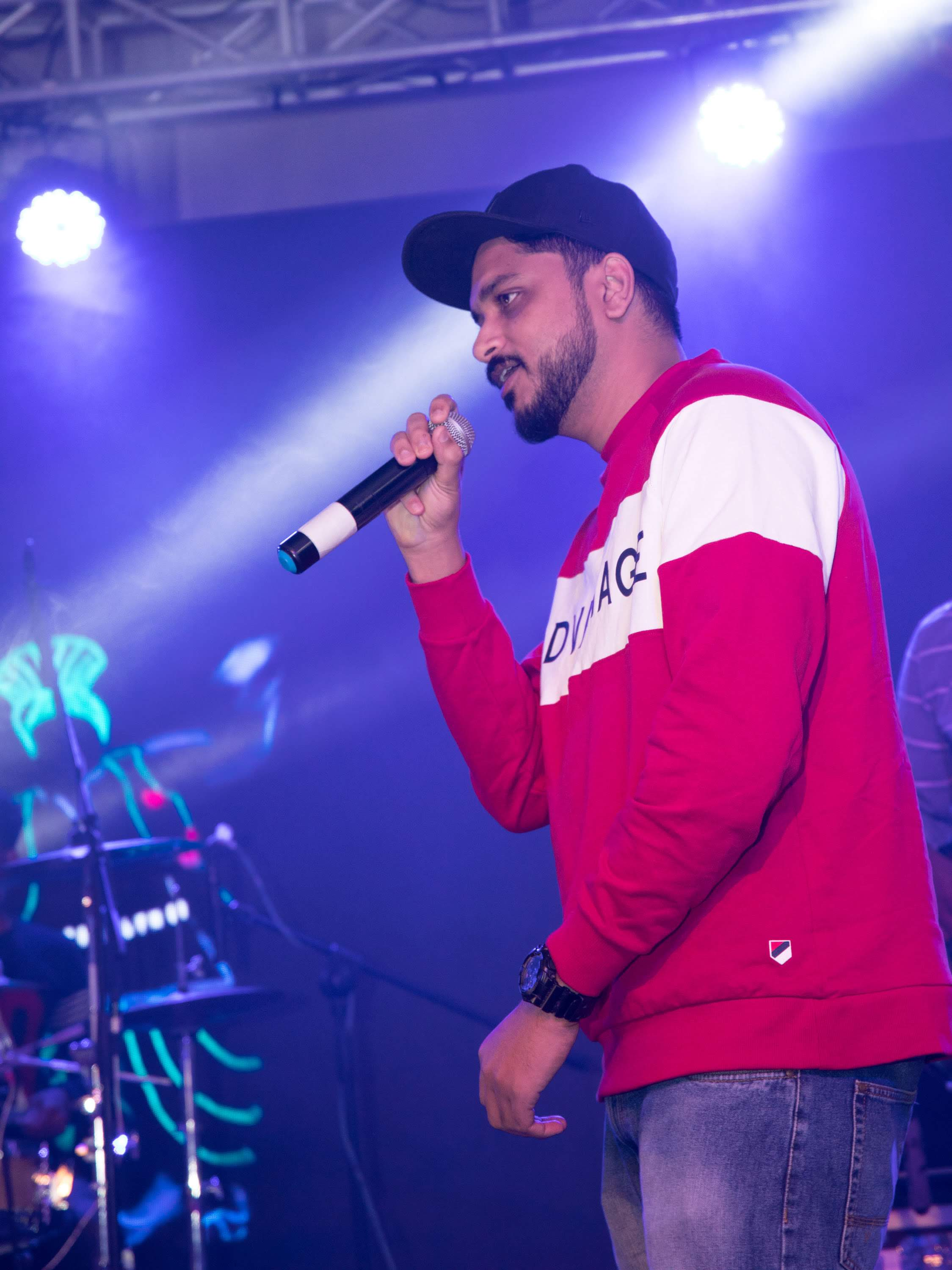

Background information
- Born: Sanju Jaison; 1 October 1988 (age 37); Kottayam, Kerala, India
- Origin: Dubai
- Genres: Alternative hip hop; Hip hop music; World Music; Independent music
- Occupations: Rapper, Music Producer
- Instruments: Logic Pro, Vocals
- Years active: 2008–present
- Label: San Jaimt Music

Sanju Jaison (born 1 October 1988), better known by his stage name San Jaimt, is an Indian rapper, songwriter and a music producer . He has worked in Malayalam cinema projects and is one of the early rappers to come out of Kerala. He is known for his independent singles "We're Sorry" (2013),"Thee" (2018),"Win" (2017), "These Wings" (2017) and "Walk Alone(2017)"

== Early life ==
Sanju was born on 1 October 1988, in Kottayam. He moved to Dubai at a young age with his parents, where he was introduced to rap music by his friends and was influenced by the songs of 2pac, Eminem and Rakim.

== Career ==
Sanju started releasing his mixtapes and independent projects in the mid-2000s, collaborating with many local talents and uploading his music on social media platforms such as Myspace, and ReverbNation under the stage name Wolfam before settling down with his musical name San Jaimt.

In 2010, he released his demos such as "Fizz de Bottles", "U n ME" and "Rapsoulman" online. After he returned to Kerala to do his engineering course at St. Joseph's College of Engineering and Technology, Palai, he met some musicians in the college music club with whom he shared music ideas. His friend, Mahesh Peter, gave him his first opportunity to rap in a college album, called 6th module which consisted of 13 tracks. Peter also introduced him to Malayalam music director Alphonse Joseph (composer).

He made his film debut in The Hitlist, released in 2012, with the help of Alponse Joseph, who was in charge of the music for the song "Kadhakalumezhuthi". Later, he was called to work for another film, Face2Face. His most notable work in Malayalam cinema includes performing the rap for the title track of the film Mr. Fraud, composed by Gopi Sundar and starring Mohanlal He later worked for movies such as ABCD: American-Born Confused Desi (Naya Paisa illa Remix), Koothara (vasudeva) and for the song "Padakal Undare" from 2022 Malayalam film Panthrandu

In 2013, he released his first independent single, "We're Sorry", which depicts a tragic love story; it was based on atrocities faced by women around the world. The song was featured in BBC Asian Network, 9XO, Malayala manorama, deccan chronicle, The Indian Express, Vh1 and other social media platforms. His second independent single "Neeyane", which was a love themed rap fusion song, was released on 14 February 2016. The song generated over 100,000 YouTube hits in less than 3 weeks.

=== 2017: Intensity ===
San Jaimt's first single "Win" from his debut album Intensity was released on 24 February 2017 and after two weeks on 10 March 2017 second single called "These wings" was released on YouTube. Both the songs had received mixed reviews. He was also featured in Khaleej times-City Times edition on 19 March 2017. He released his third single called "Walk alone" featuring dubai based band MasterPlan from his debut album Intensity on 16 April 2017 on YouTube., the fourth single called "My Mind" was released on 7 July as a part of album promotion. The full-length album was released on 18 November 2017.

=== 2018: Munvidhi ===
The single "Thee" from San Jaimt's second Malayalam Hip hop album Munvidhi was released on 23 October 2018. The song is a fusion of folk beat and Malayalam rap. His second single "Veera Kadha" from the same album was released on 6 June 2019. He announced that the full album will be released in December. San Jaimt's 5th single "Changala" was released on 3 July 2020 and features artists Vivek G Harry and Apoorva. The 6th song from the album called "Veendeduppu" was released on 18 July 2020. The song "Veendeduppu" talked about the importance of Mental health and it was featured in The New Indian Express on 23 July 2020.

=== 2021: 20 beats project ===
20 beats project was an initiative by San Jaimt promoting the Hip hop music scene in Kerala. The beats were free and were produced in a period of 2 months. The 20 beats project was meant to encourage aspiring rappers who liked to produce their own songs without any copyright issues.

=== 2021-2023: Ulka: Echoes of rage, resilience and guilt ===
San Jaimt released his first single "Scene" from his third Malayalam Hip hop album "Ulka" featuring Rzee Purplehaze on 3 April 2021. The second single "Ottayaal Pattaalam" from the album featuring ThirumaLi was released on 12 September 2021. In 2022 he released songs from the album like Slamdunk, Karnan, Kaananam, Pathiye, and Thira as a part of album promotion.The full album "Ulka: Echoes of rage, resilience and guilt" was released on 28 October 2023.

== Discography ==
Year	Track	Single	Artist	Album	Music director
2010	Fizz de bottles; U n Me; Rap Soul Man	yes	San Jaimt	Demo releases	Fort Minor(Instrumental Album: The Rising Tied)
2011	Module 6(Promo); Thodiyile Kuyil; Orupaadu Mohangal; Nammal Thaedumee		San Jaimt	6th Module	MaheshPeter
2012	Aakasha Chillil Muthande		Alphons Joseph, San Jaimt	Face to Face (2012 Malayalam film)	Alphons Joseph
2012	Kadhakalumezhuthi		Alphons Joseph, San Jaimt	The Hitlist	Alphons Joseph
2013	We're Sorry	yes	San Jaimt		San Jaimt
2013	Nayapaisa illa (Remix)		junior mehboob, Anna Katharina Valayil, Gopi Sundar, San Jaimt	ABCD: American-Born Confused Desi	Gopi Sundar
2014	Vasudeva		Pavithra Menon, San Jaimt, Gopi Sundar	Koothara	Gopi Sundar
2014	Mr Fraud (Theme Song)		San Jaimt, Gopi Sundar	Mr. Fraud	Gopi Sundar
2016	Neeyane	yes	San Jaimt, Harish		San Jaimt
2017	Win ft. PeterEm; Walk Alone ft. MasterPlan; Broken; FairyLand; My Mind; Rap Rambo; On Us ft. Diago; Remember My Name; These Wings; Through The Storms ft. Jim r Pinto		San Jaimt	Intensity	San Jaimt
2018	Thee		San Jaimt	Munvidhi	San Jaimt
2019	Veera Kadha; Johnny(Malayalam ft. CJ; Johnny(English Version)		San Jaimt	Munvidhi	San Jaimt
2020	Vazhkaiyin Payanam	Yes	K. S. Harisankar, San Jaimt	Vazhkaiyin Payanam	Sunadhshankar
2020	Changala ft. (Vivek G Harry & Apoorva); Veendeduppu		San Jaimt	Munvidhi	San Jaimt
2021	Scene		San Jaimt, rZee	Ulka	rZee
2021	Ottayaal Pattaalam		San Jaimt, ThirumaLi	Ulka	San Jaimt
2022	Padakal Unare		Hector Lewis, San Jaimt	Panthrand (2022 Malayalam film)	Alphons Joseph
2022	Slam Dunk		San Jaimt	Ulka	San Jaimt
2022	kaananam		San Jaimt	Ulka	San Jaimt
2022	Karnan		San Jaimt, Anil Panachooran	Ulka	San Jaimt
2022	Pathiye		San Jaimt	Ulka	San Jaimt
2022	Thira		San Jaimt	Ulka	San Jaimt
2022	Ulka		San Jaimt	Ulka	San Jaimt
2023	Intro		San Jaimt	Ulka	San Jaimt
2023	Check check		San Jaimt	Ulka	Thoro Beatz
2023	Mic		San Jaimt	Ulka	Anabolic Beats
2023	Lost		San Jaimt	Ulka	Anabolic Beats
2023	Rocky Balboa		San Jaimt	Ulka	KXVI
2025	Thilakkam		San Jaimt	Single	Grow Beatz
2026	Muttane		San Jaimt	Single	Anyvibe
2026	A.P.M.M (Adi poli malayalie mone)		San Jaimt	Single	San Jaimt
