= Face to Face (2012 Indian film) =

- Theatrical release poster
- Directed by: V. M. Vinu
- Written by: Manoj Payyannur
- Produced by: M. K. Nassar
- Starring: Mammootty; Siddique; Kalabhavan Mani; Ragini Dwivedi; Roma Asrani
- Cinematography: Ajayan Vincent
- Edited by: Samjith Mohd
- Music by: Alphonse Joseph
- Production company: Good Line Productions
- Distributed by: Good Line Release
- Release date: 13 November 2012
- Country: India
- Language: Malayalam

Face to Face (Titled as Face 2 Face) is a 2012 Malayalam-language crime film film directed by V. M. Vinu and starring Mammootty, Siddique, Kalabhavan Mani, Ragini Dwivedi and Roma Asrani. The film was written by Manoj Payyanur and produced by M. K. Nazar under the banner of Good Line Productions. It was released on 13 November 2012 during Deepavali alongside My Boss and 101 Weddings.

== Plot ==
Balachandran is an honest police officer who has been suspended from service following his struggle with alcoholism, which led to the breakdown of his family and his separation from his wife, Jayasree, and their son. He subsequently works as a real estate businessman and lives with his brother, Anwar, and sister-in-law, Dr. Uma. He later reunites with his childhood friends, Superintendent of Police Ramdas and Circle Inspector Abdul Lateef.

The investigation begins when Thomas, the son of former Chief Minister Kuriyan Punchakkadan, is found murdered and hung from a cross near a beach. Ramdas summons Balachandran for questioning after learning that he had met Thomas at a hotel shortly before his death. During the investigation, Balachandran reveals that Thomas was involved in prostitution, sex trafficking, and human trafficking. Thomas operated the criminal network with his associate, Nirmala Thankachi, a beautician, while their activities were based at the Pagoda Resort, owned by drug dealer Nirmal Kumar. Thomas's cousin, George, frequently assisted him in his illegal activities.

Balachandran had previously attempted to arrest Thomas, but the latter was released shortly after being taken into custody due to political influence. Thomas and George later attempted to kill Balachandran by staging a road accident, but he survived. Without Ramdas's knowledge, Balachandran assists Abdul Lateef in the murder investigation.

During the course of the investigation, Balachandran befriends four young men—Chandu, Peter, Shyam, and Rahul—and invites them to an abandoned estate. It is later revealed that Balachandran already knows they are responsible for Thomas's murder and had approached them to uncover their motive. The four confess that they killed Thomas in retaliation for the rape and murder of Peter's sister, Isa.

Balachandran subsequently reveals that Chandu is in fact his estranged son, Naveen, and reconciles with him. To protect the four youths, Balachandran falsely confesses to Thomas's murder before Ramdas and is arrested. Jayasree later visits him in prison, where they reconcile. Balachandran accepts responsibility for the collapse of their family, acknowledging that his alcoholism had been the cause of their separation.

== Cast ==
- Mammootty as CI Balachandran
- Siddique as SP T. Ramadas IPS, Balachandran's childhood friend
- Kalabhavan Mani as CI Abdul Latheef Chundakkadan
- Ragini Dwivedi as Jayasree Balachandran
- Roma Asrani as Dr. Uma Antharjanam, Balachandran's sister-in-law
- Vineeth Kumar as Anwar (TV-Reporter), Uma's husband
- Jins Varghese as Shaji (TV-Cameraman)
- Vijayaraghavan as Ex-Chief Minister Kurian Varghese Punchakadan, Thomas's father
- Firoz Khan as Thomas Kurian Punchakkadan, Kurian's son and George's cousin
- Nishanth Sagar as George Joseph Punchakkadan, Thomas's cousin and friend
- Mamukkoya as Aalikkoya, Punchakadan's driver and Peter's neighbour
- Mahesh as Raghuprasad
- Binoy Nambola as Peter
- Reena Basheer as Chandrababu's wife and Shyam's mother
- Amrita as Isa, Peter's sister
- Rajesh Hebbar as Dr. Chandrababu, Shyam's father
- Abu Salim
- Kunchan
- Sivaji Guruvayoor as DGP Nandakishore Varma IPS
- Gayathri as Constable Velayudhan's wife
- V.M.Vinu as shop owner

== Production ==
Roma Asrani and the Kannada actress Ragini Dwivedi played the lead roles along with Mammootty. The film had an ensemble cast of supporting actors including Siddique, Vijayaraghavan, Kalabhavan Mani, Mamukkoya and Kunchan along with four new faces: Gautam, Rishikesh, Rohit and Binoy. The film was extensively shot in Goa, Ernakulam and Munnar.

According to the director, Face to Face is a "high-octane thriller woven around a murder mystery. The film brings on to the screen loads of action and suspense."

== Soundtrack ==
The soundtrack features three songs composed by Alphons Joseph . The lyrics were written by Anil Panachooran and Anna San Jaimt.

Track list

No.	Title	Lyrics	Singer(s)	Length
1.	"Kannum Pooti Kathum Pothu"	Anil Panachooran	Vishakh Sasi Dharan	3:30
2.	"Aakasha Chillil muthande"	Anil Panachooran & San Jaimt	Alphons Joseph & San Jaimt	3:55
3.	"Changathi Padayum"	Anil Panachooran	Karthik & Madhu Balakrishnan	3:33
Total length:				10:18

== Release and reception ==
The film was released in 81 theaters across Kerala on 30 November 2012; the movie had gained negative responses from both critics and viewers.

Sify gave the movie two stars out of five and stated this: "With the absence of basic logic at most times and a style that was perhaps okay eons ago, this film is tough to be digested even for the hardcore fans of" Mammootty.

The Times of India also gave the movie two stars and stated: "The film does not engage the audience. It is so much pre-occupied with an infuriating surge of self-pity and some stereo-typed villainy. Save for the perennial charm on his face, even Mammootty fails to salvage a shoddily-written plot."

Rediff.com's headline was "Face 2 Face is best avoided" and added, "None of these gimmicks can salvage the film because of its weak plot and over-dependence on star power. "
