= Kudumba Sthreeyum Kunjadum =

2024 Indian film

Kudumbasthreeyum Kunjadum
- Directed by: Mahesh P. Sreenivasan
- Written by: Sree Kumar Arackal
- Produced by: Benny Peters
- Cinematography: Lawell S.
- Edited by: Raja Mohammed
- Music by: Sreejju Sreedhar; Manikandan
- Production company: Indie Films
- Release date: 31 May 2024
- Country: India
- Language: Malayalam

Kudumba Sthreeyum Kunjadum (transl. Housewife and the lamb) is a 2024 Indian Malayalam-language comedy drama film directed by Mahesh P. Sreenivasan and written by Sree Kumar Arackal. The film stars Dhyan Sreenivasan, Salim Kumar, Guinness Pakru, and Anna Rajan.

== Plot ==
A police officer pursues a gang of thieves. Meanwhile, a husband returns from overseas with his wife, leading to marital complexities.

== Cast ==
- Dhyan Sreenivasan as Jijo
- Anna Rajan as Clara Sunny
- Kalabhavan Shajohn as CI Gopalakrishnan
- Guinness Pakru as Unni
- Jaffar Idukki as Koya
- Salim Kumar as Adv.Alex
- Maniyanpilla Raju as Fr Benedict
- Saju Navodaya as Dasappan
- Sneha Babu as Meera
- Manka Mahesh as Clara's Mother
- Benny Peters as Sunny
- Jayakrishnan as Sreedharan
- Sneha Sreekumar as Mary

== Release ==
The film was released in theatres on 31 May 2024.
