= Payyans =

- Theatrical poster
- Directed by: Leo Thaddeus
- Written by: Leo Thaddeus
- Produced by: Noushad Kammu Vadakkan
- Starring: Jayasurya; Lal; Anjali; Rohini
- Cinematography: S. G. Raman
- Music by: Alphons Joseph; Rahul Raj (score)
- Production company: Kammu Vadakkan Films
- Distributed by: Beebah Creations; Sayujyam Cine Release
- Release date: 18 February 2011
- Country: India
- Language: Malayalam

Payyans is a 2011 Indian Malayalam family-drama film written and directed by Leo Thaddeus. It stars Jayasurya, Anjali, Rohini, Lal and Lalu Alex. The film's score was composed by Rahul Raj whilst the songs were by Alphons Joseph.

== Plot ==
Josy is raised by his mother Padma after her husband disappears. He drops out from the college to start his own business. But he does not succeed in his venture because of the lifestyle he leads. Later he gets a job as a Radio Jockey where he meets sound engineer Seema and falls in love.

One day John gives a call to Padma to let her know that he is alive. In excitement Padma tries to pull John's bag and she slips, falls down and dies due to head injuries. Problems start when John attempts to bring Josy's life into a proper way by enforcing discipline. . But his plans does not work out the way he planned it to be. Josy starts to hate John and on one night when he was drunk, he asks his dad to walk out.

Josy later understands how much his dad loved him. He searches for him unsuccessfully. On fathers' day when Josy was anchoring a show about it, John calls to the show and tells his experience of a dad as how much he loved his kid when he was young and how much the kid dislikes him when he grew older. Josy saw that the call came from his own home and rushes home where he finds dad and reunites with him.

== Cast ==
- Jayasurya as Josy John
- Anjali as Seema
- Lal as John Varghese
- Rohini as Padma
- Lalu Alex as Kuttappan
- Suraj Venjaramoodu as Brittas
- Janardhanan as Brittas's father
- Guinness Pakru as Japan Babu
- Kalasala Babu
- Harisree Martin
- Manka Mahesh as Seema's Mother
- Sayuj S. Menon as Josy's boss, Red FM 93.5 manager
- Jagathy Sreekumar as Seema's Father (Photo Presence)

== Production ==
The film marked the debut of Anjali in Malayalam cinema.

== Soundtrack ==
Payyans

Soundtrack album by Alphons Joseph
- Released: 18 February 2011
- Recorded: 2010
- Genre: Feature film soundtrack
- Length: 22:42
- Label: Manorama Music
- Producer: Naushad Kammu Vadakkan

Alphons Joseph chronology
Cocktail (2010)	Payyans (2011)	Casanovva (2011)

The songs of the film were composed by Alphons Joseph with lyrics penned by Kaithapram Damodaran, Anil Panachooran. The background score for the film was composed by Rahul Raj.

Track listing
No.	Title	Lyrics	Singer(s)	Length
1.	"Doore Vazhiyirulukayaayi"	Anil Panachooran	Alphonse Joseph	07:12
2.	"Kadha Parayaan"	Kaithapram Damodaran	Jayachandran	04:58
3.	"Rout Mari"	Anil Panachooran	Rashmi Vijayan	04.29
4.	"Thennal Chirakundo"	Kaithapram Damodaran	Karthik, Jyotsna Radhakrishnan	04:01
5.	"Thennal Chirakundo [Unplugged]"	Kaithapram Damodaran	Karthik, Jyotsna Radhakrishnan	02:42
Total length:				22:42
