= Mr. Fraud =

2014 film by B. Unnikrishnan

- Theatrical release poster
- Directed by: B. Unnikrishnan
- Written by: B. Unnikrishnan
- Produced by: A.V. Anoop
- Starring: Mohanlal; Miya; Dev Gill; Vijay Babu; Siddique; Vijayakumar; Manjari Phadnis; Pallavi Purohit
- Cinematography: Satheesh Kurup
- Edited by: Manoj
- Music by: Gopi Sunder
- Production company: A.V.A Productions
- Distributed by: Maxlab Entertainments (India); PJ Entertainments (overseas)
- Release dates: 17 May 2014 (India); 23 May 2014 (International)
- Running time: 138 minutes
- Country: India
- Language: Malayalam
- Box office: ₹17 crore (US$1.8 million)

Mr. Fraud is a 2014 Indian heist action thriller film written and directed by B. Unnikrishnan. The film stars an ensemble cast of Mohanlal, Dev Gill, Vijay Babu, Miya, Manjari Phadnis, Siddique, Vijayakumar, Pallavi Purohit, Rahul Madhav, Sai Kumar, Suresh Krishna, Devan and Kalasala Babu. The film was produced by A. V. Anoop under the banner A. V. A Productions. The film follows an infamous thief who as his final assignment plans to plunder the treasure from a royal household.

The film's soundtrack and background score were composed by Gopi Sunder. Action choreography was directed by Stunt Silva. The film was released on 17 May 2014 where it received mixed reviews from critics.

== Plot ==
Two royal brothers Ravindra Varma and Mahendra Varma, fight for the royal family treasure along with their sons. During the fight, a prism from the idol of the goddess explodes. The brothers are frightened and immediately stop the fight. After conducting certain rituals, they find that the goddess is angry because of the bloodshed that happened, and it is decided that the treasure will be locked for 41 years.

In the present, Bhai Ji is a con artist, who disguises himself as John Cliff and successfully loots ₹100 crore (US$10 million) from a wedding along with his assistants Abbas and Priya. At that time, his acquaintance Javed introduces him to Nikhil Adharva "Nikki", who tells Bhai Ji about the royal treasure and the story behind it. He shows the list of royal family members, who are inheriting the treasure. They are Ravindra Varma's sons Vasudeva Varma and Sri Krishna Varma and Mahendra Varma's sons Shekhara Varma, who is the royal head and Rajashekhara Varma. Nikki tells that Rajashekhara Varma has moved to the court, stating that the treasure should be given back to the government and used for helping the public rather than dividing among themselves. The case is pending in the court, and this will be the right chance to steal the treasure. Bhai Ji demands ₹500 crore (US$52 million) for doing the job and an advance of ₹250 crore (US$26 million) before doing it.

Meanwhile, the family arranges security arrangements as they fear a heist, and the police department sends DYSP Sajan to guard the family and treasure. They appoint a private consultant named Sivaram from Jaipur to assess the value of the treasure, but before he reaches there, Bhai Ji kidnaps him and takes him to his place. Rajashekara Varma takes Bhai Ji to the royal palace, where he meets the other family members. Later, the cellar is opened, and Bhai Ji begins assessing the value of the treasure. He realizes that this is the riskiest mission he has ever attempted. Meanwhile, Rajashekhara Varma is attacked by some goons, and before they could kill him, Bhai Ji arrives, and defeats the goons. Rajashekhara Varma thanks Bhai Ji for saving his life, but Sajan and Saraswathy, who is Rajashekhara Varma's daughter, have suspicions. Nikki and Javed arrive along with the real Sivaram and meet Bhai Ji, who gives the video clippings of the treasures and tells Nikki to make a replica of it. Nikki agrees and leaves.

Meanwhile, Rajashekar has become friends with Bhai Ji and tells him about Sarawathy and shows him the school run by her, which is still under construction. Bhai Ji and his assistants decided to find out a way to steal the treasure from the cellar. He guesses that there should be a secret path behind the cellar that would lead to another exit after studying the architecture of several other palaces. In the night, the three of them leave to search for the door. Bhai Ji enters the cellar and, using a metal detector, finds the passage and the exit point. Before leaving out of the cellar, he talks to the idol and tells that there is a secret between them, which is also known to someone else. Sajan accidentally tells the other family members regarding Saraswathy's past, which only he and Rajashekara Varma knew. Saraswathy was assaulted by unknown people when she was only 12 years old, and Rajashekhara Varma had adopted her after that incident.

Initially, he had instructed Sajan to try to find the culprits, but later on, seeing that it would be futile, he asked Sajan, who was the CI at that point in time, to close the case. Upon the knowledge of Saraswathy's past, Rajashekhara Varma's daughters and their husbands threaten him to withdraw the case that he had filed with the court, or else they would file another case to re-investigate the issue. An infuriated Rajashekhara Varma starts to hit Sajan, and Bhai Ji intervenes. Rajashekhara Varma narrates the incident to Bhai Ji. 15 years back, Sajan was chasing a thief, who had robbed a bank, and on the way, he encountered an unconscious Saraswathy, and takes her to the hospital, where he informs Rajashekhara Varma, who was the local MLA. Though they tried to find the culprits, they didn't succeed. Rajashekhara Varma tells Sajan not to charge any case as it would affect Saraswathy's future, and Rajashekhara Varma adopts her.

Sajan also tells Bhai Ji that though he had a suspicion on him, he is now convinced that Bhai Ji is innocent and that he has found out the people, who were behind the attack on Rajashekhara Varma and that he was planning to meet them at night when a party will be conducted at the palace. Bhai Ji tells that it is dangerous for Sajan to go alone and he would accompany him, but Sajan refuses Bhai Ji's help. Saraswathy arrives at the palace, along with Rajashekhara Varma and tells the family members that they can do whatever they want, but her father wouldn't withdraw the case. Shekara Varma comes in defence of Saraswathy and promises her that no one will harm her. Bhai Ji is disturbed, and when asked by Abbas and Priya, he tells them that he was the thief that Sajan was chasing, and on the way, he saw three people chasing Saraswathy. He extended his hand to help her while he was driving, but she missed it. Bhai Ji became confused about whether to stop and save the girl or run away as the cops were right behind him.

He decided to move away from there to avoid getting caught. He tells them that from that day, the incident used to haunt him and he was shocked to see the girl again. That night after the party, Nikki and the gang arrive with the duplicate treasure, and they begin the heist. Bhai Ji enters the cellar through the secret tunnel, and Nikki places a GPS inside the boxes to make sure that Bhai Ji doesn't cheat them. After taking the treasure out, Nikki informs Bhai Ji that the final transaction will be in Jaipur, and Abbas can come with them so that Bhai Ji can trust them. The next day Bhai Ji submits his evaluation report, and before he leaves, the cops arrive there and informs them that Sajan has been murdered and arrest Rajashekhara Varma as he is the main suspect. Bhai Ji leaves for Jaipur. Javed and Nikki tell him that they are not going to pay him anything and he should return the ₹250 crore (US$26 million) if he wants Abbas back.

Bhai Ji tells them that a few more people have to arrive and tells them that he has brought the third party (unknown entity) that teamed up with Nikki and hired him for the heist. The unknown entity happens to be Shekhara Varma and his son Sudhakara Varma, who was captured by Bhai Ji's henchman Bittoo when they arrived to Jaipur for the final transaction. Bhai Ji tells Shekhara Varma that he knows him well about him and he is not a simple person like others, but a wicked person. He tells him that it was the goddess which told him the truth. When Bhai Ji was searching for the door to a secret tunnel inside the cellar, he finds an old bullet stuck on the walls, and he realized how the prism broke. During the fight, when Vasudeva Varma was going to strike Shekara Varma with a sword, he secretly had a gun with which he shot at the prism.

Mahendra Varma learnt about his son's evil intentions and lied to others about the goddess's wrath and locked the cellar as a punishment for Shekhara Varma. Though he was happy with getting one-fourth of the treasure, he was upset when his brother Rajashekhara Varma filed a case, and this prompted him to join with Nikki and plan a heist. Even he was the one who planned to kill Rajashekhara Varma so that if he dies, Vasudeva Varma and Sri Krishna Varma would become the suspects, and they will begin to distrust each other while Shekhara Varma can move forward with the case and extend the time for a heist. Bhai Ji knows that Sudhakara Varma was the one who killed Sajan, and Abbas had secretly shot the murder in his phone upon Bhai Ji's instructions, and the visuals have been sent to the cops. A fight ensues, and after some time, Abbas has Nikki at gunpoint after Bhai Ji defeats him.

Javed begs for mercy, and Bhai Ji tells him to take the van having the treasure to a place along with Sudhakara Varma and Sivaram. After they leave, he tells Nikki and Shekhara Varma that Abbas had planted a bomb in the van and presses the button triggering a blast which kills the three of them, and kills Nikki. Bhai Ji leaves a gun back, telling Shekara Varma that it was destiny that brought him there for the job and he had never stolen the treasure. Instead, he exchanged the treasure between the boxes along with the boxes and that he got ₹250 crore (US$26 million) for doing nothing. He also leaves telling that Shekhara Varma can choose his punishment. Shekara Varma commits suicide. Two years later, Saraswathy's school has been completed, and Bhai Ji visits Saraswathy and Rajashekhara Varma, who thank him for all the help he did, like funding for the school, helping Rajashekhara Varma to win the case and also saving him from the Sajan's murder case. Bhai Ji confesses to Sarawathy that he was the man who had offered his hand to save her, but couldn't do it, and he tells them that this is his only confession. When Saraswathy asks him about his real name, he tells her that she can call him Mr. Fraud.

== Cast ==
- Mohanlal as Bhai Ji / John Cliff / Sivaram Varma
- Siddique as ex-MLA Rajashekhara Varma
- Miya as Saraswathi
  - Amritha Anilkumar as Young Saraswathi
- Vijay Babu as Abbas
- Dev Gill as Nikhil Adharva aka Nikki (voice dubbed by Saiju Kurup)
- Vijayakumar as Shekara Varma (voice dubbed by Shivaji Guruvayoor)
- Manjari Phadnis as Priya
- Pallavi Purohit as Damini Varma
- Sai Kumar as Intelligence DYSP Sajan
- Rahul Madhav as Sudhakara Varma
- P. Balachandran as Vasudeva Varma
- Devan as Sri Krishna Varma
- Suresh Krishna as Thrivikrama Varma
- Rajeev Parameshwar as Prathap Varma
- Ashvin Matthew as Javed
- Balaji Sarma as Shivaram
- Mukundan
- Manoj
- V. K. Sreeraman as Ravindra Varma
- Kalasala Babu as Mahendra Varma
- Sathaar
- Balachandran Chullikkadu as Advocate Idiculla
- Biju Pappan
- Sriranjani as Bhai ji's mother (in flashback)
- Gopi Sundar as himself (cameo appearance)
- Balabhaskar as himself (cameo appearance)
- Stunt Silva as Bittoo (cameo appearance)

== Production ==
=== Genre ===
According to B. Unnikrishnan, Mr. Fraud is not a total heist film, neither does it quite follow the conventions and cliches of a crime caper. "Mr. Fraud is a curious mix. It is part grey, part action, part thriller and part musical," says the director. He adds: "It's the first time I am attempting this genre, I have never tried my hands at a potboiler before. The film has tastefully-shot songs, daredevil stunts, high-voltage drama and coiled suspense. At the same time it's not a mindless medley as Mr Fraud also has a focused storyline to keep the viewers hooked. Mr Fraud zooms into a spate of unexpected events that come his way and how he negotiates the situation. It's more of an emotional thriller."

=== Filming ===
Though delayed for a while due to Mohanlal's Ayurvedic treatment, the film commenced its production on 19 February 2014. The film was shot mainly from Ottappalam and Kochi in two schedules. Aspinwall House, Kochi was a significant location. The climax scenes were shot from Mumbai and Jaipur. The shooting of the film was wrapped on the day of Vishu festival (15 April) in Jaipur.

== Music ==
Mr. Fraud

Soundtrack album by Gopi Sunder
- Released: 25 April 2014
- Genre: Film soundtrack
- Length: 20:13
- Language: Malayalam
- Label: Muzik 247
- Producer: Gopi Sunder

Gopi Sunder chronology
How Old Are You (2014)	Mr. Fraud (2014)	Bangalore Days (2014)

The soundtrack and background score were composed by Gopi Sunder. The lyrics were written by Harinarayanan and Chittoor Gopi. The film has four songs, including the theme track sung by the composer himself, along with San Jaimt, and a re-orchestrated version of the keerthana, "Sadaa Paalaya", sung by Carnatic vocalist G. N. Balasubramaniam. The song "Poothinkale" sung by Shankar Mahadevan, in which Mohanlal appears in a rock star getup with salt and pepper look, went viral in music sharing websites. The song Sada Paalaya received a positive response from audiences

Track listing
No.	Title	Lyrics	Singer(s)	Length
1.	"Poonthinkale"	Chittor Gopi	Shankar Mahadevan, Shakthisree Gopalan	5:02
2.	"Khuda Woh Khuda"	Harinarayanan	Shankar Mahadevan	6:45
3.	"Sadaa Paalaya"	G. N. Balasubramaniam	Sudeep Kumar, Sithara	5:12
4.	"Mr.Fraud Theme"	Gopi Sunder	Gopi Sunder, San Jaimt	3:15
Total length:				20:14

== Marketing and release ==
=== Theatrical ===
Mr. Fraud released on 17 May 2014. An android app was developed to publicise details of the film.

=== Home media ===
The channel satellite rights were sold to Amrita TV for an amount of ₹18 crore (US$1.9 million). The film grossed a ₹13 crore distributor's share in one month.

=== Legal issues ===
The film was scheduled to be released on 8 May 2014. However, the Film Exhibitors Federation imposed a ban on the film in protest against B. Unnikrishnan's alleged instructions to the Film Employees Federation of Kerala (FEFKA) and Association of Malayalam Movie Artists (AMMA) representatives not to participate in the inauguration function of the federation's new office building. The issue reached a flashpoint with the FEFKA saying that no other Malayalam film will be released in cinemas refusing to screen Mr. Fraud. Finally, Exhibitors Federation allowed to release Mr. Fraud, but imposed a blanket ban on B. Unnikrishnan. Liberty Basheer, the president of Exhibitors Federation, said in a statement: "The federation had announced the ban on the film without any prior intimation and we don't want the distributor or the producer to incur any losses because of this. So the Mohanlal-starrer will hit the theatres on the said date. But we won't exhibit any film that Unnikrishnan plans to write, direct or produce in the future in Kerala."

== Reception ==
=== Critical response ===
Mr. Fraud received mixed reviews from critics.

Aswin J. Kumar from The Times of India rated the film 3.5 in a scale of 5 and said, "Mr Fraud is not at all such a tedious watch with its luxuriant display of gadgets, air-screen projectors and dialogues resonant with technical terms. The fight and chase happen with the accompaniment of dry leaves propelled away with vigour, but certainly not as unbearable as the tiring song sequences which offer no mercy for ears." Sify.com's reviewer gave the verdict as "average" and commented, "With a rather flimsy premise, the film is presented in a grand scale, but it is evident that the opulence is limited to some colourful garments, swanky cars and technical gimmicks."

International Business Times wrote: "Mr Fraud is a decent masala entertainer, though it not as gripping as one would expect from a heist film." Paresh C. Palicha of Rediff.com rated the film 2 in a scale of 5 and concluded that "only the hardcore Mohanlal fans will like Mr Fraud which is otherwise an uninteresting film."

Chandrakanth Viswanath of The New Indian Express described the film as "a fine attempt in a novel genre" and concluded his review saying: "Carved in the popular format, with enough action-packed sequences and convincing performances, coupled with technical finesse, Mr Fraud has the potential to win hearts of die-hard Mohanlal fans and thrill junkies alike."
