= The Face of the Faceless =

2023 Malayalam-language film

- Directed by: Shaison P. Ouseph
- Written by: Jayapal Ananthan
- Produced by: Sandra D'Souza Rana
- Starring: Vincy Aloshius
- Cinematography: Mahesh Aney
- Edited by: Ranjan Abraham
- Music by: Alphons Joseph
- Distributed by: Tri light creations
- Release date: 2023
- Country: India
- Language: Malayalam

The Face of the Faceless is a 2023 Malayalam language movie directed by Shaison P Ouseph and written by Jayapal Anandan. Vincy Aloshious is the main actress in the film. The film has been made to the list of Oscar eligibility for the best Original score categories at the 96th Academy Awards in 2024. The movie is based on the true story of Sr. Rani Maria, her life among the most vulnerable, and her tragic death in their cause. In addition to the original Hindi version, the movie has also been released in Malayalam, Tamil, Telugu, and Spanish editions.

The film has received over 123 international awards and has been recognised as the Best Christian Film of 2024. With strong ratings on acclaimed platforms such as IMDb (7.9/10), BookMyShow (9.3/10), and The Times of India (4.7/5), the film has garnered universal praise and appreciation. Its poignant portrayal of justice, sacrifice, and forgiveness has deeply moved audiences worldwide and even earned special acclamation during an audience at the Vatican with the Holy See.

== Plot ==
Sr. Rani Maria is a Catholic nun and social worker who works among the poor and marginalized people in Indore, Madhya Pradesh. She is known as "Indore Ki Rani" or "Queen of Indore" by the villagers who respect and love her for her service and compassion. She also has a loving family in Kerala, where she was born and raised.

However, some powerful and influential people are threatened by her work and advocacy for the rights and dignity of the poor. They hired a hitman named Samander Singh to assassinate her. Samander Singh follows her and waits for the right opportunity to strike.

One day, he attacks Sr. Rani Maria on a bus while she is traveling to Kerala for a vacation. He stabs her multiple times in front of the horrified passengers and escapes. Sr. Rani Maria dies on the spot, leaving behind a trail of blood and tears.

The police arrest Samander Singh and charge him with murder. The media covers the incident and the public expresses outrage and grief. The villagers in Indore mourn the loss of their beloved "Queen". Sr. Rani Maria’s family in Kerala receives the news and is devastated. They also receive a letter from Sr. Rani Maria that she wrote before her death, in which she expresses her love and forgiveness for her killer and asks them to do the same.

Sr. Rani Maria’s family decides to forgive Samander Singh and accept him as their brother. They visit him in prison and embrace him. They also attend his trial and plead for his release. Samander Singh is moved by their gesture and repents of his crime. He converts to Christianity and joins the Franciscan order. He dedicates his life to serving the poor and spreading the message of forgiveness and peace. The story ends with a message of hope and reconciliation.

== See also ==
- Christianity in India
