= Neeyane =

Single by San Jaimt
- Released: February 14, 2016
- Recorded: January 2016; (Dubai, U.A.E)
- Genre: Hip hop; rap
- Length: 3:33
- Label: Forte Beatz Productions
- Songwriter(s): San Jaimt
- Producer(s): San Jaimt

Music video
- "Neeyane" on YouTube

"Neeyane" is a song by Indian rapper San Jaimt featuring Harish. This is a love themed rap fusion song, combining Malayalam melody with English rap. Lyrics of the song were written by San Jaimt, Harish Chandran and Girish Chandran. This song was released on Valentine's Day, February 14, 2016. Music video was directed by Girish Chandran and major scenes were shot in Kochi, Kerala, India. Girish Chandran, Nithya and San Jaimt appears in the music video.
