= Panthrandu =

2022 Malayalam-language film

- Official Film Poster
- Directed by: Leo Thaddeus
- Written by: Leo Thaddeus
- Produced by: Victor Abraham
- Starring: Vinayakan: Dev Mohan; Shine Tom Chacko; Lal
- Cinematography: Swaroop Sobha Sankar
- Edited by: Nabu Usman
- Music by: Alphons Joseph
- Production company: Skypass Entertainment
- Release date: 24 June 2022
- Running time: 146 minutes
- Country: India
- Language: Malayalam

Panthrandu (transl. Twelve) is a 2022 Indian Malayalam-language action drama film written and directed by Leo Thaddeus. The film stars Vinayakan, Dev Mohan, Shine Tom Chacko and Lal in important roles.

== Cast ==
- Dev Mohan as Emmanuel
- Vinayakan as Anthro
- Shine Tom Chacko as Pathro, Anthro's younger brother
- Lal as Peelu
- Srinda as Sicily, Pathro's wife
- Sreelatha Namboothiri as Rossy, Sicily's mother
- Amala Rose kurian as Rachel, Zacheaus's daughter
- Veena Nair as Elsie, Anthro's sister
- Prasant Murali as Jude
- James Eliya as Srank Paily
- Sundara Pandyan as Yacob, Elsie's husband
- Sohan Seenulal as Zacchaeus
- Vijayakumar as S.I. Vattaoli
- Vettukili Prakash as Lazar
- Jayakrishnan as Kora
- Swetha Vinod as Mariya
- Oorali Martin as John

== Production ==
The film began production in 2021. During the press conference of the film when Vinayakan was asked about his #MeToo allegations, he said that he has never harmed any woman.

== Soundtrack ==
The soundtrack features three songs composed by Alphons Joseph . The lyrics were written by Joe Paul, Hari Narayanan and San Jaimt.

Track list

No.	Title	Lyrics	Singer(s)	Length
1.	"Thatti Veezhaan"	Leo Thaddeus	Martin Oorali	1:46
2.	"Padakal Unnare"	Joe Paul & San Jaimt	Hector Lewis, San Jaimt & ThirumaLi	3:17
3.	"Melle"	Hari Narayanan	Shahabaz Aman	3:39
Total length:				8:42

== Release and reception ==
The film released on 24 June 2022.

V. Vinod Nair of The Times of India wrote that "The film with its themes of friendship, family and love between brothers, amid the action thriller feel, makes it an entertainer for the family audience, as well". Sarin S. Rajan of Malayala Manorama called the film's flow slow but praised the visuals and strong screenplay.
