= Vellithira (2003 film) =

2003 Indian film

- Soundtrack cover
- Directed by: Bhadran
- Written by: Bhadran
- Produced by: Latha Mohan
- Starring: Prithviraj Sukumaran; Navya Nair; Kalabhavan Mani
- Cinematography: S. Kumar
- Edited by: Ranjan Abraham
- Music by: Alphons Joseph
- Production company: Shlok Films
- Distributed by: Shlok Release
- Release date: 27 June 2003
- Country: India
- Language: Malayalam

Vellithira (transl. Silver Screen) is a 2003 Indian Malayalam-language comedy-drama film written and directed by Bhadran. It stars Prithviraj Sukumaran and Navya Nair. The story is about a young man who is working hard to raise his sister. The music was composed by debutant Alphons Joseph.

== Plot ==
A teenage girl named Thatha is living with her blacksmith brother Vakkathi Vasu and his wife and children. Style Raj is a guy who moves from place to place with a movie projector and shows movie to public on the run for a living. He meets Thatha and falls in love. Vasu discovers that Raj is actually the murderer of the landlord who killed his father. In the end Raj is sent to jail and later marries Thatha.

== Cast ==
- Prithviraj Sukumaran as Raghuram (Style Raj)
- Kalabhavan Mani as Vakkathi Vasu
- Navya Nair as Thatha
- Kavya Madhavan as Pankajam, Raghuram's sister
- Sudheesh as Mohammad
- Vinayakan as Padavan
- Jagathy Sreekumar as Erumathadam Jose
- Salim Kumar as Surendran Vaduvanchery
- Oduvil Unnikrishnan as Peppatty Nair
- Cochin Haneefa as Panchayath President
- Ashokan as Gopu
- Kalpana as Pushpam
- Indrans as Iyamkutty, tea shop owner
- Machan Varghese as Nooli Thommy
- Meghanathan as Shivankuttan
- Bindu Panicker as Bhavani, Vasu's wife
- Bindu Ramakrishnan as Raj's mother

== Soundtrack ==
The film's soundtrack contains 13 songs, all composed by Alphons Joseph. Lyrics were written by Shibu Chakravarthy and Kaithapram.The film marked the debut of Alphons as a film composer. The audio launch for this film's soundtrack was launched by A. R. Rahman.

| # | Title | Singer(s) |
|---|---|---|
| 1 | "Hridayasakhee" | Hariharan |
| 2 | "Hridayasakhee" (D) | Hariharan, K. S. Chitra |
| 3 | "Karinkallil Kadanjedutha" | Sujatha Mohan, Vidhu Prathap, Chorus |
| 4 | "Kudamullakkadavil" | Sujatha Mohan |
| 5 | "Pacha Maanga" | Shankar Mahadevan, K. S. Chitra |
| 6 | "Nee Manimukilaadakal" | P. Jayachandran, K. S. Chitra |
| 7 | "Ottuvacha" | Biju Narayanan, Anwar Sadath, Bindu |
| 8 | "Velichathin Vellithooval" | Alphonse Joseph |

== Awards ==
- Kerala Film Critics Award - Best Female Singer - Sujatha Mohan (also for Kasthooriman)
