= Pachamarathanalil =

- Directed by: Leo Thaddeus
- Written by: Leo Thaddeus
- Produced by: G. Sureshkumar
- Starring: Sreenivasan; Padmapriya; Lal; Lalu Alex; Nassar
- Cinematography: Manoj Pillai
- Music by: Alphons Joseph
- Production company: Revathy Kalamandhir
- Distributed by: Pyramid Saimira Group
- Release date: 9 May 2008
- Country: India
- Language: Malayalam

Pachamarathanalil is a 2008 Indian film produced by Revathy Kalamandhir, written and directed by debutant Leo Thaddeus. It stars Sreenivasan and Padmapriya in the lead roles with Lalu Alex, Lal and Nassar in other pivotal roles. The film's score and soundtrack is written by composer, Alphons Joseph.

== Plot ==
Sachidanandan alias Sachi is a well known cartoonist who is much popular as the creator of Thumpi, a very popular cartoon character in a children's magazine. Sachi's wife Anu, a government employee is much obsessed with their 7-year-old daughter Sneha's studies. They lead a happy family life with Sneha, who is the cynosure of all eyes and attracts attention wherever she goes and inspires the creation of the cartoon character Thumpi.

The story begins to get hotter when an Advertisement film maker happens to notice Sneha and invites her to cast in his new advertisement film which is to be shot in Chennai. Sneha seems enjoying and easy going like a professional actress in the entire sets. After some days, the shoot is packed up for a shift to Pollachi. During the trip, Sachi gets shocked to find that Sneha is missing in the bus and he becomes frantic. He could not even imagine what will happen if Anu happens to know the news.

The drama at the highways takes a curious turn when CI Venkatachala Iyer alias Venkiti reaches the scene to investigate the case. Suddenly, a twist occurs which turns out that Sneha is not the daughter of Sachi. The film goes on to tell what happened to Sneha and who actually Sneha is. It was later revealed that Ali was the father of Sneha. Ali was unjustly accused and imprisoned for a bomb blast in Coimbatore and Sneha's mother died in childbirth and Sachi had found Sneha when Ali was caught by the police. Back in the present, Ali allows Sachi and Anu to look after Sneha since they've cared for her throughout her life as he is led to the back of the police van.

== Cast ==
- Sreenivasan as Sachidanandan
- Padmapriya as Anu
- Nassar as CI Venkatachala Iyer
- Lal as Mohammed Ali
- Lalu Alex as Alfie
- Suraj Venjaramoodu as Jose
- V. K. Sreeraman as Lohi
- Sukumari as Nun
- Meera Vasudevan as Maala
- Vinayakan as mad man
- Kalabhavan Shajohn as SI Murugan
- Chali Pala as Constable Muthaiya

== Production ==
Majority of the movie was shot in and around Palakkad and Pollachi.
