= Entammede Jimikki Kammal =

Song by Vineeth Sreenivasan Ranjith Unni

from the album Velipadinte Pusthakam
- Language: Malayalam
- Released: 16 August 2017
- Recorded: 2017
- Studio: Shaanz Eternal Ray; Noise Head Quarters; Freddy's Audio Video Garage
- Genre: Filmi
- Length: 3:21
- Label: Satyam Audios
- Composer: Shaan Rahman
- Lyricist: Anil Panachooran

Shaan Rahman chronology
"Meda Meeda Abbayi" (2017)	"Entammede Jimikki Kammal" (2017)	"Goodalochana" (2017)

Music video
- "Entammede Jimikki Kammal" on YouTube

"Entammede Jimikki Kammal", or simply "Jimikki Kammal", is a 2017 song from the soundtrack of the Malayalam film Velipadinte Pusthakam (2017). The song is composed by Shaan Rahman and sung by Vineeth Sreenivasan and Ranjith Unni. Taken from various folk songs, "Jimikki Kammal" is written by Anil Panachooran. The song became popular and produced several dance covers uploaded by fans on YouTube.

== Development ==
Benny P. Nayarambalam, script writer of Velipadinte Pusthakam, suggested music director Shaan first four lines of the "Jimmikki Kammal" and requested him to compose a similar song. However, Benny was reluctant to use the same lines. Later, lyricist Anil Panachooran and Shaan decided to use the same lines and director Lal Jose agreed to it.

== Release and reception ==
The song was released as a promo video for the film on 17 August 2017. Instantly, the song became a hit and several dance video covers appeared in YouTube and Facebook. And several among these became viral

The most popular dance video was done by a group of teachers and students from Indian School of Commerce, Kochi. This dance video and the two lead dancers, Sheril G Kadavan and Anna George rose into fame. Sheril got offers to act in films. Later News Corp bagged the rights to stream this video globally.

A dance cover by Nicole and Sonal from team Naach from Mumbai also became popular. Actor-producer Vijay Babu informed that they will do a dance performance in his production Aadu 2. Another popular video was uploaded by the makers of the film Aadhi. Pranav Mohanlal, Anusree, Aditi Ravi and Linta Jeethu were the dancers in this one.

American actor and television host Jimmy Kimmel tweeted about the song saying that he loved it.
