= Lonappante Mamodeesa =

Lonappante Mammodisa
- Film poster
- Directed by: Leo Thaddeus
- Written by: Leo Thaddeus
- Produced by: Shinoy Mathew
- Starring: Jayaram; Anna Rajan
- Cinematography: Sudheer Surendran
- Edited by: Ranjan Abraham
- Music by: Alphons Joseph
- Production companies: Pen & Paper Creations
- Distributed by: S Talkies Release
- Release date: 1 February 2019
- Country: India
- Language: Malayalam

Lonappante Mammodisa (transl. Lonappan's baptism) is a 2019 Indian Malayalam-language comedy drama film written and directed by Leo Thaddeus. The film features Jayaram and Anna Rajan in lead roles. It was released on 1 February 2019.

== Plot ==
Lonappan is a middle-aged man who leads a simple life with his three unmarried sisters. Even though he runs a watch repair shop along with his assistant Shameer, Lonappan has already lost interest in his job. After a series of events, Lonappan decides to pursue his childhood passion, storytelling.

== Cast ==
- Jayaram as Lonappan
  - Eric Zakariya as Young Lonappan
- Shanthi Krishna as Valyechi
- Anna Rajan as Leena
- Eva Pavithran as Rosliy
- Joju George as Babu
- Nisha Sarang as Cicily
- Hareesh Kanaran as Shameer
- Kaniha as Neelima
- Dileesh Pothen as Kunjuoottan
- Alencier Ley Lopez as Fr. Stephen Chacko
- Niyas Backer as Simon
- Vishak Nair as Sony
- Irshad as Vareed
- Anjali Nair as Annakkutty
- Sneha Sreekumar as Aleyamma
- Innocent as School Teacher (Guest Appearance)
- Davinchi Santhosh
- Adv Dr. Kriss Venugopal as Kriss Venugopal

== Production ==
This is the fourth film directed by Leo Thaddeus.

== Soundtrack ==
All songs were composed by Alphons Joseph.

No.	Title	Lyrics	Singer(s)
01	"Punya Rasa"	Hari Narayanan	Vineeth Sreenivasan
02	"Manju Puthacha"	Hari Narayanan, Joffey Tharakan & Leo Thaddeus	Alphons Joseph and Tessa Chavara
03	"Chinkariyam"	Hari Narayanan	Joseph Alphons
04	"Meghakkattil"	Hari Narayanan	Alphons Joseph
05	"Lonappa Enthanappa"	Joffey Tharakan	Jassie Gift

== Reception ==
A critic from The Times of India wrote that "Lonappante Mammodisa might make you smile and probably, urge you to think about re-visiting your long-lost passion, if it's given a chance".
