= Anna Rajan =

Indian actress

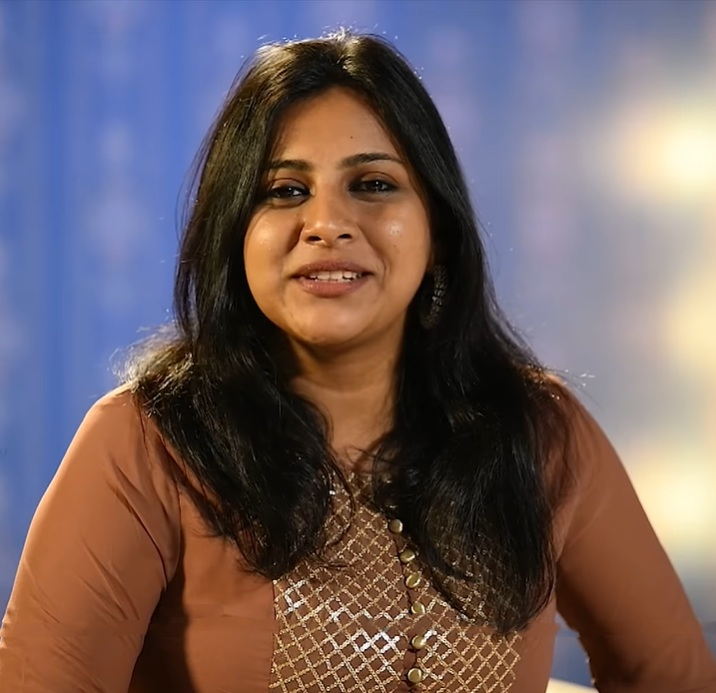
- Anna Rajan in 2019
- Born: Anna Reshma Rajan; Aluva, Kerala, India
- Education: Government Medical College, Ernakulam
- Occupation: Actress
- Years active: 2017 – present

Anna Reshma Rajan is an Indian film actress, who appears in Malayalam films. She made her acting debut in 2017 with Angamaly Diaries.

== Early life ==
Anna Rajan was born in Aluva, Kerala, to Sheeba and K. C. Rajan. She has an elder brother named Shaun. She was educated at the Nirmala School, Muvattupuzha, and then at St. Francis School in Aluva. Later, she studied Nursing at Government Medical College, Ernakulam. Her father died while she was in college, and his sudden demise placed financial pressure on the family, prompting her to take up jobs during her studies.

== Career ==
She worked as a nurse in Rajagiri Hospital in Aluva before foraying into films. She was identified by producer Vijay Babu and director Lijo Jose Pellissery after seeing her face in a hoarding in Kerala. They made her audition for the role of Lichy in Angamaly Diaries. Including her, the film introduced 86 debutant actors. In the film she is credited as Reshma Rajan. After that, she preferred to be credited as Anna Rajan. For her performance, she received nominated for Filmfare Award for Best Supporting Actress – Malayalam.

Her second film was the Lal Jose-directed Velipadinte Pusthakam (2017), in which she played the female lead role opposite Mohanlal. In 2019, she acted in Lonappante Mamodeesa starring Jayaram and Madhura Raja opposite Mammootty. In 2020, she played the role of Koshy's wife Ruby in the action drama Ayyappanum Koshiyum alongside Prithviraj Sukumaran.

== Filmography ==
Year	Title	Role	Notes
2017	Angamaly Diaries	Lichy	Credited as Reshma Rajan
2017	Velipadinte Pusthakam	Mary	
2018	Militia	Teacher	Short film
2019	Lonappante Mamodeesa	Leena	
2019	Madhura Raja	Lissy	
2019	Sachin	Anjali	
2019	Swarnamalsyangal		
2020	Ayyappanum Koshiyum	Ruby Koshy Kurien	
2020	Wonder Woman Vidya	Vidya	Short film
2022	Randu	Mercy	
2022	Thirimali	Jansi	
2024	Kudumba Sthreeyum Kunjadum	Clara Sunny	
2025	Daveed	Herself	Cameo
2026	Jailer 2	Dileep's Wife	Tamil debut

== Awards and nominations ==
Filmfare Awards South

- 2018: Nominated - Best Supporting Actress – Malayalam – Angamaly Diaries
