= Leo Thaddeus =

Indian film director and screenwriter

- Born: Thrissur
- Occupations: Film director; Screenwriter
- Years active: 2008
- Known for: Oru Cinemakkaran(2017), Lonappante Mamodeesa(2019) and Panthrandu(2022)

Leo Thaddeus (born 15 August 1971) is an Indian film director and screenwriter who works in Malayalam cinema.

== Career ==
Leo Thaddeus is known for Pachamarathanalil(2008), Payyans(2011), Oru Cinemakkaran(2017), Lonappante Mamodeesa(2019) and Panthrandu(2022). He has worked in the film industry for 20 years and has written and directed more than five feature films, seven short films and ten documentaries in various languages.
