= Mariam Vattalil =

Indian activist and Catholic religious sister (1954–1995)

Blessed Regina Mariam of Vattalil FCC

Virgin, martyr
- Born: 29 January 1954; Pulluvazhy, Ernakulam district, Kerala India
- Died: 25 February 1995 (aged 41); Nachanbore Hill, Indore, Madhya Pradesh, India
- Venerated in: Catholic Church
- Beatified: 4 November 2017, Indore, India by Cardinal Angelo Amato
- Feast: 25 February

Rani Maria Vattalil, FCC (29 January 1954 – 25 February 1995) was an Indian Catholic religious sister and social worker of the Franciscan Clarists who worked in the Diocese of Indore. Vattalil, a Syro-Malabar Eastern Catholic, dedicated herself to catechetical formation and educational instruction in different areas of the region. She was vocal in matters of social justice, which led to her murder by those opposed to her aid of the poor.

Vattali's cause for canonization was opened after her death, and she was beatified in Indore on 4 November 2017.

== Life ==
=== Childhood and education ===
Mariam Vattalil was born in Kerala, India, on 29 January 1954 as the second of seven children to Paily and Eliswa Vattalil. Her baptism was celebrated at the Church of Saint Thomas on the following 5 February, with her name being chosen in honour of the Mother of God. Her siblings were: Stephen, Annie, Varghese, Thressiamma, Celine (later became a Franciscan clarist as "Selmy Paul") and Lusy. Vattalil received both her First Communion and Confirmation on 30 April 1966 and often frequented catechism lessons. She studied at a government-run primary school.

=== Religious life ===
Vattalil joined the Franciscan Clarist Congregation in Kidangoor, Kerala, following the completion of her secondary schooling and assumed the religious name of Rani Maria upon joining and entering their novitiate. Her cousin Cicily would become Soni Maria. The two set off for the convent and entered the order on 3 July 1971 for their aspirancy period, which concluded on 30 October 1972. Their postulancy spanned from 1 November 1972 to 29 April 1973 and their novitiate spanned from 30 April 1973 to 20 April 1974.

Her first profession was made on 1 May 1974 before she was sent to Saint Mary's Convent in Bijnor, Uttar Pradesh, where she arrived on 24 December 1975; she served there as a teacher from 8 September 1976 to 7 August 1978. Her duties continued there and she made her final profession of vows on 22 May 1980 at Angamaly, Kerala, in the church of Saint Hormis. On 21 July 1983, she was transferred to Odagady, and arrived there on 25 July; she served as the coordinator of social activities there. From 1 June to 31 July 1985 she spent time in silence and solitude at Aluva while later serving as the local superior from 30 May 1989 to 15 May 1992. It was around this time that she received a degree in sociology from Rewa University. Vattalil was later transferred to Udayanagar on 15 May 1992 and arrived there on 18 May.

== Murder ==
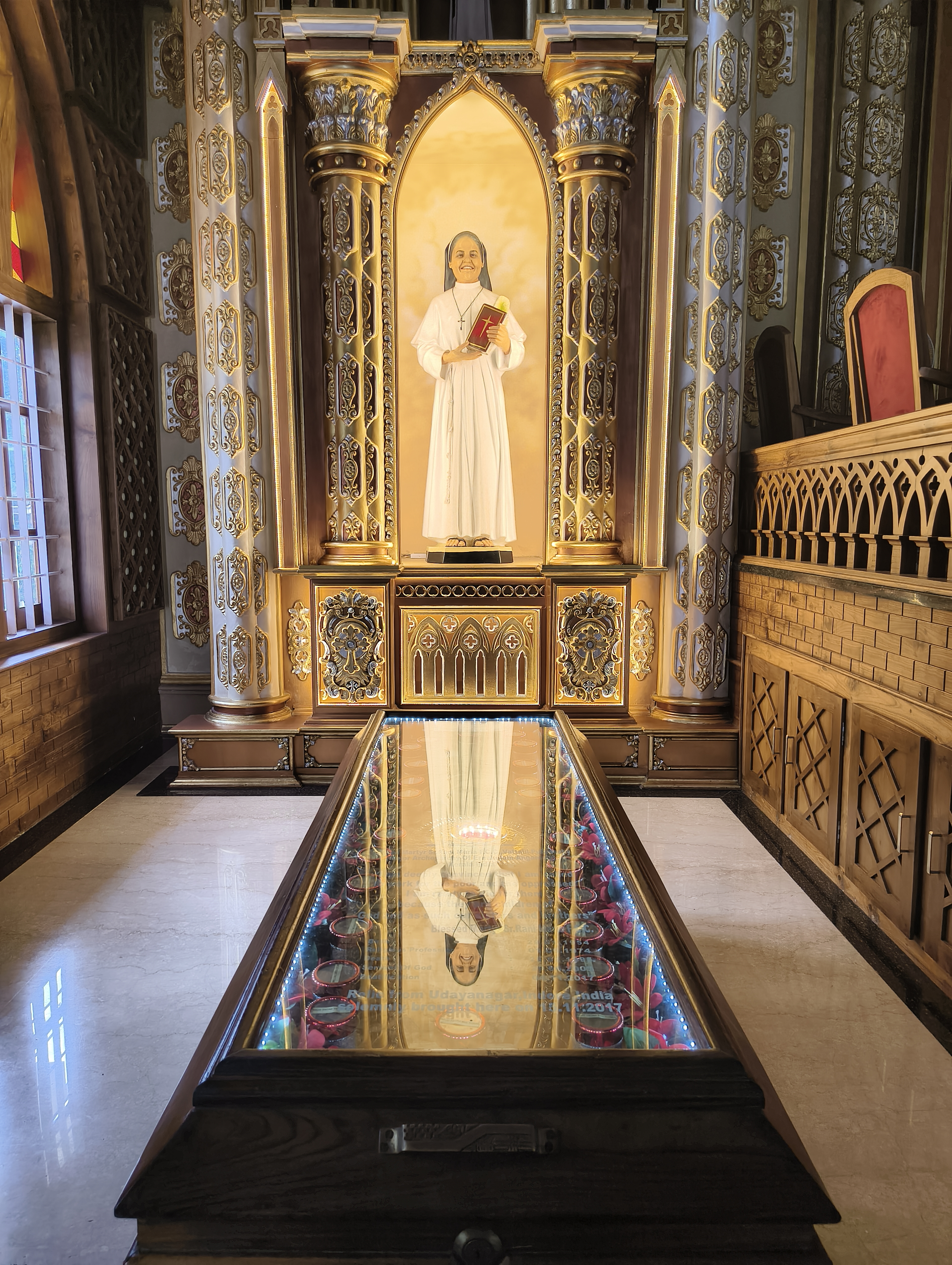
Relics of Blessed Rani Mariam

On 25 February 1995 she woke up early for breakfast after having gone to the chapel prior to anyone else joining her there. She and two other religious reached the bus stand to be told that the bus trip was cancelled. The trio decided to return to the convent when they saw the bus with the name 'Kapil' which was the one that she was to travel on. Sister Liza Rose asked if the conductor could reserve a seat for Rani Maria to which the conductor allowed. Sister Liza Rose helped her into the bus and bade her farewell.

A man dressed in white kept her bag near the driver and asked her to sit in the back, which was something unusual in the town since the sisters were given front seats whenever in public transport. Vattalil agreed where she was seated with three men who had the intention of killing her. The leader – Jeevan Singh – sat with his guard Dharmendra and Samundar Singh. Jeevan began insulting her before Samundar rose from his seat and asked the driver to stop the bus. Singh broke a coconut against a rock on the road's side and entered the bus distributing the pieces to the passengers. He offered one to her but withdrew it to make a fool out of her before drawing a knife and stabbing her in the stomach. He continued to stab her and dragged her out of the bus, which had stopped, and continued stabbing her. The passengers were too wrought with fear to intervene with some fleeing the scene in panic.

Vattalil was murdered in a knife attack by hitman Samandar Singh in Nachanbore Hill in Indore on 25 February 1995 while she made her way to Indore in a bus; she had 40 major injuries besides 14 bruises and unto the last breath said: "Jesus!" repeatedly. The murder was arranged because some landlords were offended due to her work among the landless poor.

The police at 10:45 am contacted the sisters to inform them of what had happened and to tell them that their slain sister's remains were still on the side of the road. The distraught sisters contacted the Bishop of Indore George Anathil to inform him of what had happened before Anathil and some priests reached the spot at 2:00pm to find her bloodied corpse which was taken to the episcopal residence to be cleaned and laid in state.

=== Posthumous recognition ===
Cardinal Oswald Gracias described her work as an "heroic example ... siding with the poor and disadvantaged". A museum in her honour exists in Ernakulam. Her remains were exhumed for inspection and reburial on 18 November 2016 in Indore with the diocesan bishop overseeing the exhumation.

=== Samundar Singh ===
Singh was convicted of Vattalil's murder and was sentenced to life imprisonment. Vattalil's sister visited Singh in prison where she expressed her forgiveness on 31 August 2002. Singh was overcome after witnessing such a gesture and begged for forgiveness for what he had done while expressing repentance. Vattalil's mother visited Singh on 25 February 2003 and kissed his hands as a sign of forgiveness.

Singh was released from prison in 2006 due to good conduct. He was pardoned by Vattalil's family, and he is considered one of their own. He was moved to tears when he learned of her impending beatification in March 2017 and expressed his enthusiasm for being able to attend the beatification.

== Beatification ==
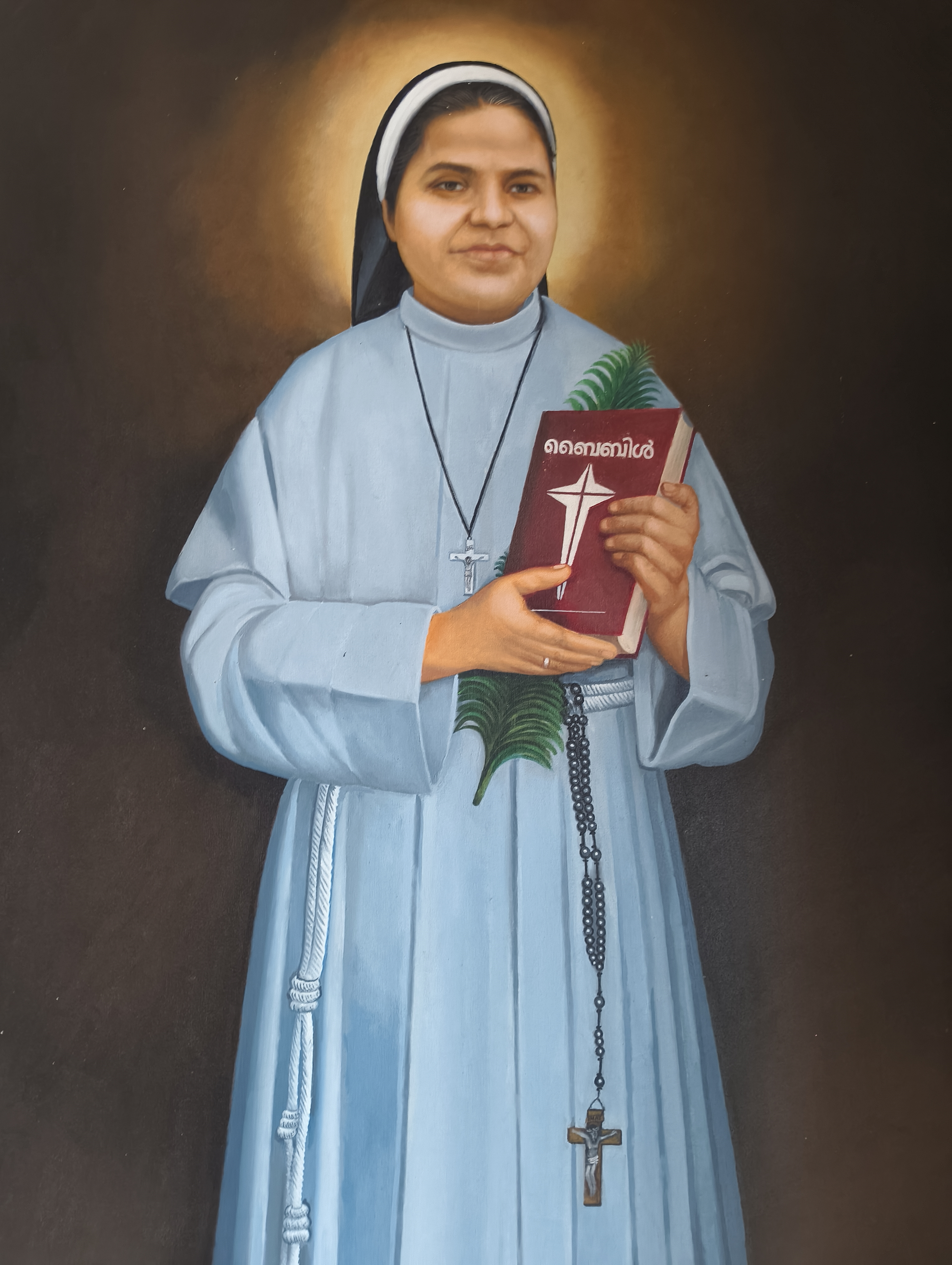
Portrait of Rani Mariam

The diocesan process took place in Indore from 29 June 2005 to 28 June 2007. The Congregation for the Causes of Saints received the Positio in 2014. Pope Francis approved the cause on 23 March 2017 and confirmed that Vattalil would be beatified on 4 November 2017 in Indore. The postulator assigned to the cause is Fra Giovangiuseppe Califano.

== In popular culture ==
The documentary entitled The Heart of a Murderer, depicting the murder and subsequent repentance of Samundar Singh, was the winner at the World Interfaith Harmony Film Festival of 2013.

In 2023 a movie named The Face of the Faceless was created inspired from her life.

== Gallery ==
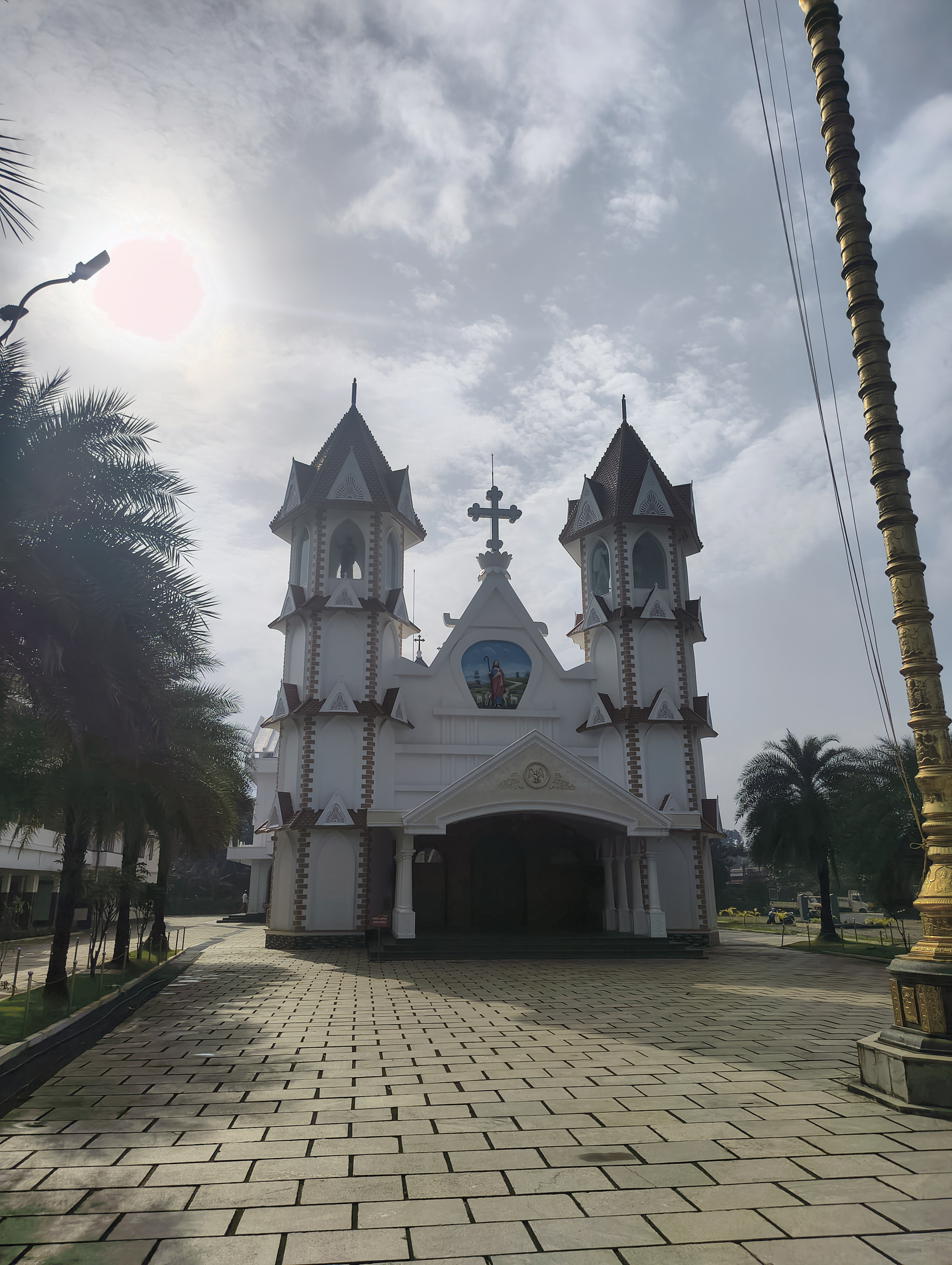
Parish Church dedicated to Blessed Rani Mariam (Pulluvazhy Church)

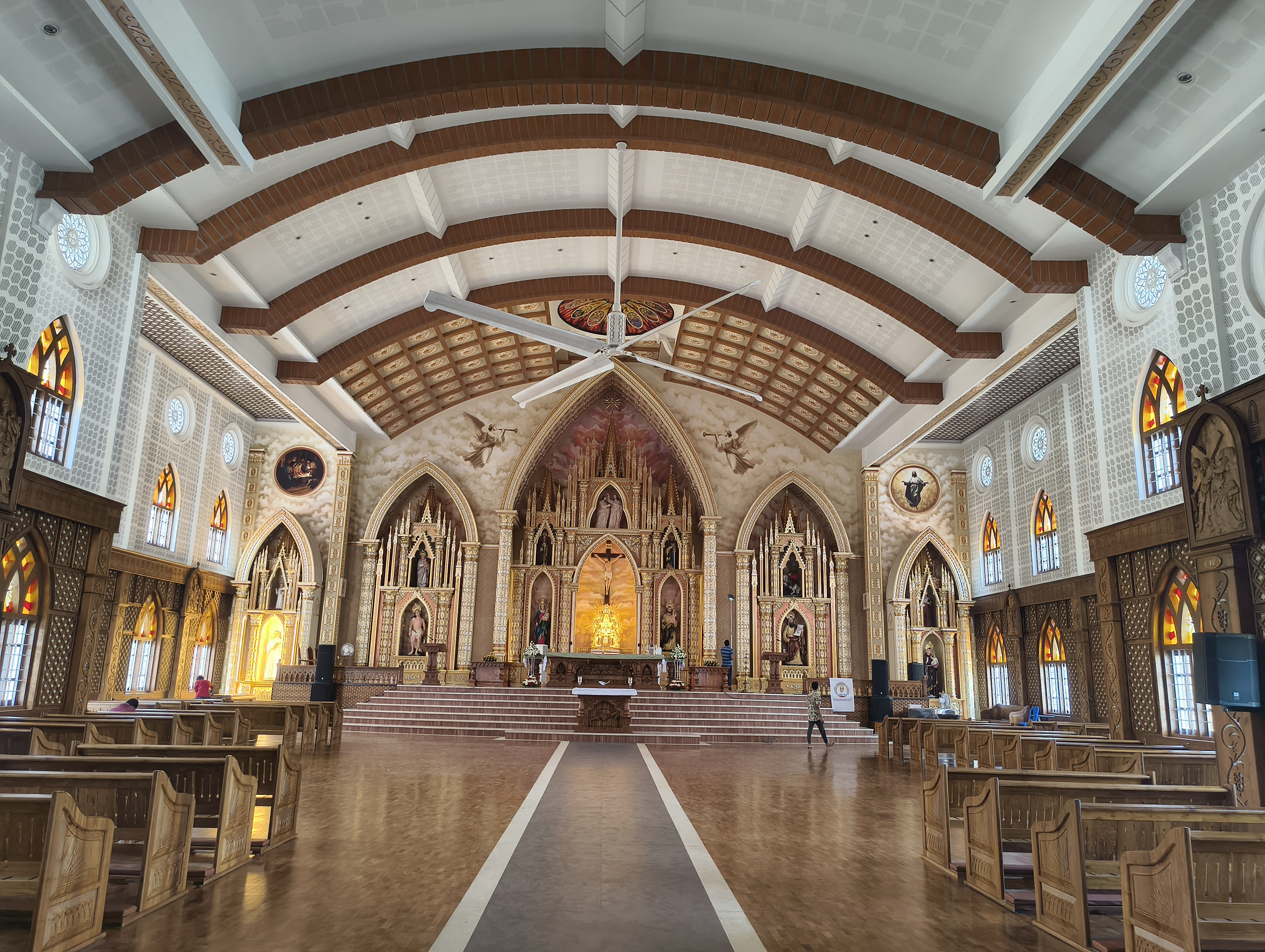
Altar of Pulluvavazhy Church

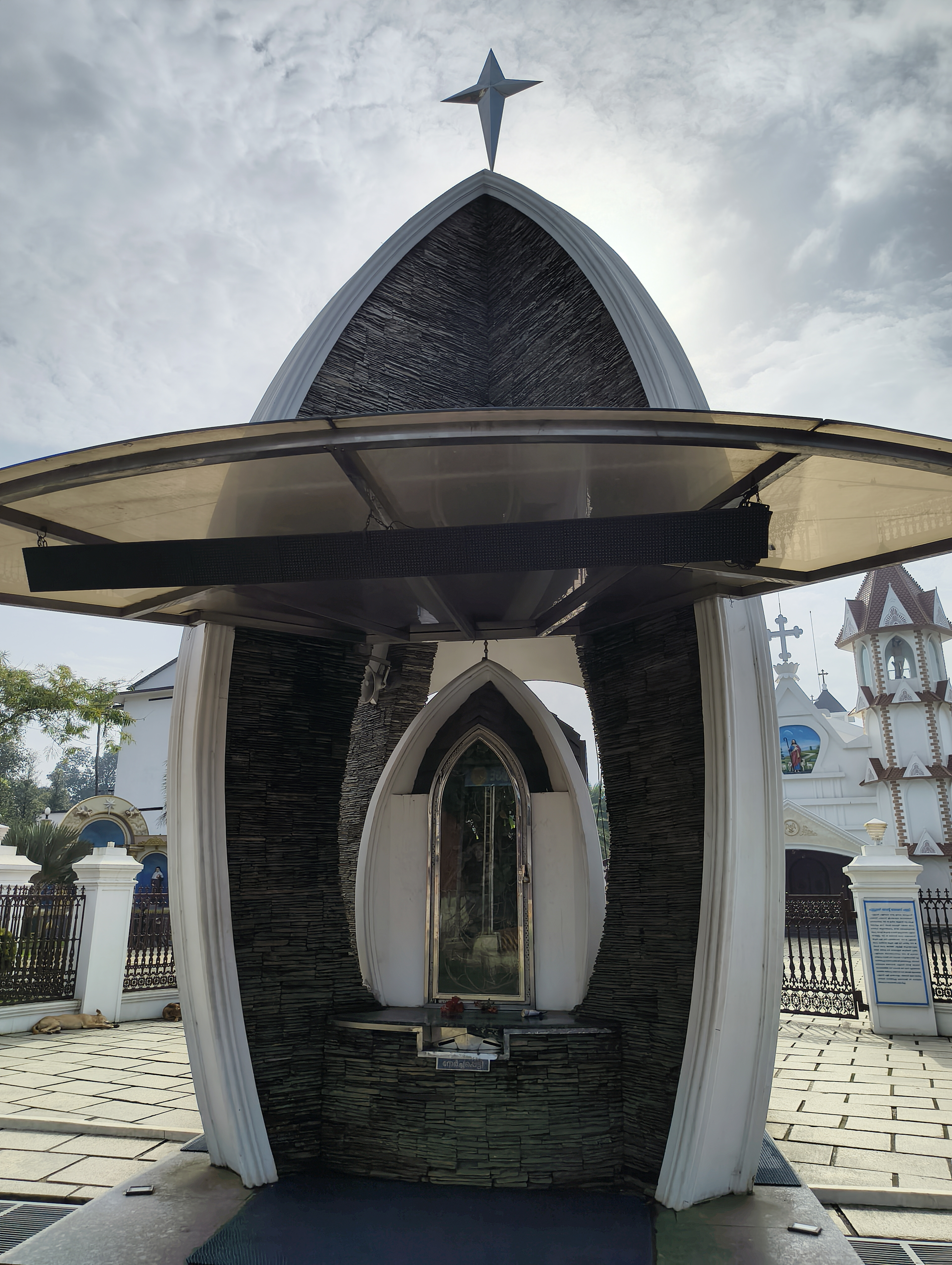
Shrine of Pulluvazhy Church
