= Randu =

2022 Malayalam film

- Theatrical release poster
- Directed by: Sujith Lal
- Written by: Sujith Lal
- Produced by: Prajeev Sathyavarthan
- Starring: Vishnu Unnikrishnan; Tini Tom; Mareena Michael Kurisingal; Musthafa; Anna Rajan; Mamitha Baiju; Irshad
- Cinematography: Anishlal R S
- Edited by: Manoj Kannoth
- Music by: Bijibal
- Production company: Heavenly Movies Private Ltd
- Release date: 7 January 2022
- Country: India
- Language: Malayalam

Randu (transl. Two) is a 2022 Indian Malayalam-language political satire comedy film written and directed by Sujith Lal. The film stars Vishnu Unnikrishnan, Tini Tom, Mareena Michael Kurisingal, Musthafa, Anna Rajan, Mamitha Baiju, Irshad in lead roles. It was produced by Prajeev Sathyavarthan under the banner of Heavenly Movies Private Ltd and the music was composed by Bijibal. It was released on 7 January 2022.

== Cast ==
- Vishnu Unnikrishnan as Vava
- Tini Tom as Nalinan
- Sudhi Koppa as Shajahan
- Mareena Michael Kurisingal as Rubina
- Musthafa as Vava's friend
- Anna Rajan as Mercy
- Mamitha Baiju as Kunjumol
- Irshad as Mujeeb
- Gokulan as Chandran
- Mala Parvathy as Rubina's mother
- Rajesh Madhavan as Sulaiman
- Kalabhavan Rahman as mukri
- Vishnu Govindan as Devadas

== Production ==
The first look of the film was revealed by actor Mohanlal on 1 July 2020. Vishnu Unnikrishnan and Anna Rajan were announced as joining the production in July 2020. Principal photography started on 23 December 2020 and the shoot was wrapped on 16 February 2021. Director Sujith Lal conformed that Anna Rajan of Angamaly Diaries fame plays the female lead during an interview with The Times of India. Later Tini Tom became the executive producer

== Reception ==
The film was released on 7 January 2022. Anna Mathews critic of The Times of India gave 3.5 out of 5 stars and wrote that "Vishnu Unnikrishnan brings charm, innocence and sincerity to the role of Vava." Sajin Shrijith, a critic from Cinema Express stated that "The film is not in a hurry to get to its destination" and gave 3.5 out of 5. OTTplay critic gave 2.5 out of 5 and wrote that "True to its title, the film's director shows the two different sides of communal politics that aims to divide people who are united. While the core message is ably delivered, it comes at the cost of the entertainment quotient of the political satire that only has few memorable moments." Ajith Babu critic of Onmanorama stated that "The film manages to remind us that everyone is equal and that this country belongs to all".
