= Oru Cinemakkaran =

- Theatrical release poster
- Directed by: Leo Thaddeus
- Written by: Leo Thaddeus
- Produced by: Thomas Panicker
- Starring: Vineeth Sreenivasan; Rajisha Vijayan; Anusree
- Cinematography: Sudheer Surendran
- Edited by: Ranjan Abraham
- Music by: Bijibal
- Production company: Opus Penta
- Distributed by: LJ Films Pvt. Ltd.
- Release date: 24 June 2017
- Running time: 132 minutes
- Country: India
- Language: Malayalam

Oru Cinemakkaran is a 2017 Indian Malayalam-language feature film written and directed by Leo Thaddeus, starring Vineeth Sreenivasan in lead role, with Rajisha Vijayan, Anusree, Vijay Babu, Prashant Narayanan, Renji Panicker, Lal, Joy Mathew and Sasi Kalinga in supporting roles.

The film was released on 24 June to mixed reviews.

== Plot ==
Alby is an assistant director trying to make a name in the Malayalam film industry. He is in a relationship with Sara. Alby's father, a Jacobite priest, isn't happy either with his career choice or his relationship with Sara. Sara's father is a hooligan from Mattancherry who has fixed her marriage with an Italian-Indian, Gonzalves. Sara defies this and marries Alby. There he steals from a neighbor tenant Sudheer and to avoid defamation he murders him, the spur of the moment crime affects him and his family life. But, in an unbelievable twist Alby's misfortune changes and his decisive moment as a filmmaker happens.

== Cast ==
- Vineeth Sreenivasan as Alby Stephen
- Rajisha Vijayan as Sara Thomas
- Anusree as Nayana
- Vijay Babu as Sudheer
- Prashant Narayanan as Police officer
- Renji Panicker as Fr. Stephen, Alby's father
- Joy Mathew as Lonnappan, Bank Manager
- Lal as Thomas, Sara's father
- Jacob Gregory as Gonzalves
- Sasi Kalinga as Chacko
- Jaffar Idukki as Kumaran
- Abu Salim as Ganeshan
- Hareesh Perumanna as Babu
- Noby Marcose as Jabbar
- Chali Pala as Rajeshekharan
- Reshmi Boban as Alby's mother
- Santhosh Pandit as himself (Cameo-appearance)
- Tomichan Mulakupadam as producer
- Rebecca Santhosh as Sara's Friend
- Subeesh Sudhi as Gokul

== Soundtrack ==
Music: Bijibal, Lyrics: Santhosh Varma, Rafeeq Ahamed, B. K. Harinarayanan

- "Angotto Ingotto" - Bijibal
- "Ozhukiyozhuki" - Haricharan, Shweta Mohan
- "Chirakukalaayi" - Arun Alat
- "Kannaake Mazhavillu" - Vineeth Sreenivasan, Teenu Tellence
