= Velipadinte Pusthakam =

- Theatrical release poster
- Directed by: Lal Jose
- Written by: Benny P. Nayarambalam
- Produced by: Antony Perumbavoor
- Starring: Mohanlal; Anoop Menon; Anna Rajan; Priyanka Nair; Salim Kumar; Chemban Vinod Jose; Appani Sarath
- Cinematography: Vishnu Sarma
- Edited by: Ranjan Abraham
- Music by: Shaan Rahman
- Production company: Aashirvad Cinemas
- Distributed by: Maxlab Cinemas and Entertainments
- Release date: 31 August 2017 (India)
- Running time: 157 minutes
- Country: India
- Language: Malayalam

Velipadinte Pusthakam (transl. Book of Revelation) is a 2017 Indian Malayalam-language action comedy film directed by Lal Jose and written by Benny P. Nayarambalam. The film was produced by Antony Perumbavoor through Aashirvad Cinemas; it stars Mohanlal with Anoop Menon, Anna Rajan, Priyanka Nair, Siddique, Salim Kumar, Sanjeev M Pillai and Chemban Vinod Jose in supporting roles. Shaan Rahman composed the film's soundtrack and score.

The film follows the lives of many people associated with a lesser-known seaside college. When a newly appointed vice principal acts in a fundraising film for his college, problems begin to rise as he unveils the truth behind a crime and gets absorbed in it. Principal photography took place between May and July 2017, primarily in the neighbourhoods of Thiruvananthapuram and Alappuzha in Kerala.

Velipadinte Pusthakam was released in India on 31 August 2017. The song "Entammede Jimikki Kammal" from the film sung by Vineeth Sreenivasan and Renjith Unni was a viral hit attracting national and international attention for the first time in the Malayalam music industry.

== Plot ==
During the Karkidakam season in 2007, Vishwanathan, also known as Bullet Vishwan, is ambushed while riding his motorbike. As he fights his attackers, two men—Maathan Tharakan and Kaaka Rameshan—arrive. Maathan hits Vishwan with a steel bar, killing him.

Prof. Premraj, also called Kamaraj, is the vice-principal of a college who tries to stop relationships between male and female students while continuing a relationship with a cleaner, and watches pornographic videos. Two student gangs; the 'kadappuram' (seafront) gang led by Franklin and the 'Thiruvananthapuram' (city) gang led by Sameer are always at loggerheads with each other. During one of these fights, the gangs break a picture of Vishwan. Premraj installs CCTV cameras in the campus. Franklin's friend Vignyanaakoshi interferes with the system to show pornographic videos; Premraj turns on the monitor, sees the videos and is caught by Fr. Joseph Kaattuparamban, who suspends him from his job. Premraj tells Sameer and his gang he is innocent of the offence but is being replaced as vice-principal and is powerless to act. He orders the gang to break the new vice-principal's legs; Sameer agrees to this and the gang hold a small protest by the gate as Premraj's replacement arrives. Franklin also arrives and congratulates the new vice-principal.

The new vice-principal is Michael Idicula, who avoids Sameer's plan to break his legs. He introduces himself to the teachers, including Mary. Michael's first class of students—especially Sameer, who was praised for making a short film—seem to like him. This disappoints Franklin, who was expecting Michael to befriend Franklin instead. One day, Michael meets Franklin's father Varkey, who is drunk and invites Michael to his house. He meets Franklin's family. Later, the physics teacher Anumol, who is Mary's friend, decides to propose to Michael on her behalf. When they go to meet Michael, he tells them to meet after the morning Mass at the local Latin church. They discover Michael is a priest and wonder why he still did not marry. Anumol and Mary cancel their planned proposal; instead Anumol asks Michael if he knows anyone willing to marry Mary, to which Michael agrees. Meanwhile, Michael reconciles Sameer and Franklin and their gangs, and they also meet Vareethettan, who has been serving Michael's family for a long time.

Michael, as vice-principal, is popular with the students and the staff. When Michael suggests making a feature film to raise money for building two hostels for the college, Fr. Kaattuparambu gives permission, providing only the Phoenix College staff and students are in the film. Michael calls his friend, Malayalam film producer Vijay Babu, about the project, and he agrees to take part. According to Vijay, the story is only suitable for a short film and Michael suggests the story of Vishwan, who had campaigned for a college to be built on land originally owned by Maathan Tharakan. He describes Vishwan as a violent but honest man who always did the right thing whenever he could. Maathan Tharakan killed Vishwan the day after the college's cornerstone was laid, and paid to have his right-hand man Kaaka Rameshan sent to jail. Vijay says the story is perfect and goes ahead with the project.

Auditions for the film's characters are held and all of the roles except that of Vishwan—whom no-one portrays well—are cast. Because of this, Vijay decides to freeze the project. They eventually find someone who is perfect for the role—Michael—who changes his appearance completely. The film's production begins.

Principal photography of the film begins; all of the actors—except Premraj (portraying Maathan Tharakan), who has difficulties in acting—perform well. Meanwhile, Michael meets Vishwan's widow Jayanthi and her second daughter Sreekutty, who explain that their first daughter died. One night, Premraj is beaten up by the real Maathan Tharakan and his gang, who warn him Michael will suffer the same fate if he carries on with the film. Michael goes to meet Maathan and tells him filming must continue. One night, Maathan tells Michael the story about Vishwan's death is wrong and that Kaaka Rameshan was the true killer; Vishwan was killed because he married Rameshan's lover Jayanthi. Shocked, Michael asks Sameer and Franklin to restructure the climax; after much argument, both agrees to the demands.

The crew film the death of Vishwan's first child. After the filming, Michael signs a form in the name of Vishwan, shocking Vareethettan. He tells the staff and students Michael's father resented his son becoming a priest and forcibly removed him from the seminary; this incident affected Michael as a psychological illness. Vareethettan says Michael adopts the personality of characters he really likes, and asks them to stop Michael from acting. Michael vanishes but he—still speaking as Vishwan—threatens Varkey into revealing how Vishwan's first daughter died; Varkey says Kaaka Rameshan drowned her in a pond. Varkey told the real Vishwan everything and Vishwan started fighting Rameshan and got himself killed. The next day, Rameshan is released from jail and tells some of the people there he killed Vishwan, shocking everyone. Rameshan creates a fuss at the filming and then arrives at the climax scene. There, Michael—who is supposed to be receiving a whack on the head from another actor—stops and beats up the actor. Rameshan gets involved and tells the crew he killed Vishwan, angering Michael, who nearly kills Rameshan.

Vishwan's death is not depicted in the students' film; instead a caption tells the audience; "Vishwan lives in the minds of everyone". Michael's illness has been cured and the bishop explains that Michael is the best person to inaugurate the new hostel. He does this and announces that he will become the new principal of the Phoenix College. The film ends as all of them stands together to take a selfie.

== Cast ==
- Mohanlal as Prof./Fr. Michael Idicula / Bullet Vishwan
- Anoop Menon as Vishwanathan / Bullet Vishwan
- Arun Kurian as Sameer
- Appani Sarath as Franklin
- Anna Rajan as Mary
- Priyanka Nair as Jayanthi
- Salim Kumar as Prof.Premraj Idikkattutharayil
- Chemban Vinod Jose as Kaaka Rameshan
- Siddique as Maathan Tharakan
- Shivaji Guruvayoor as Fr. Joseph Kaattuparamban
- Sneha Sreekumar as Anumol
- Vijay Babu as himself
- Alencier Ley Lopez as Vareethettan
- Prasad Mohammah as Varkey
- Jude Anthany Joseph as Vignyanakoshi
- Neha as Vishwan's first daughter
- Venkitesh V. P. as College student (special appearance in the song "Entammede Jimikki Kammal")

== Production ==
=== Development ===
In an interview with Manorama Online in May 2015, Lal Jose announced he would soon direct a film with Mohanlal. in the lead roles and had already received an advance payment from producer Antony Perumbavoor for Aashirvad Cinemas. In September, however, he said he would precede with a short-scheduled film by December and a Nivin Pauly film in early 2016, and had the "other film in mind". His first-time working with both actors together, Lal had made earlier attempts to make a film with Mohanlal, which never worked out.

The project started during a story discussion with screenwriter Benny P. Nayarambalam, when Lal asked him if he could come up with a story that would suit Mohanlal. Benny described a character he had in mind, which Lal found interesting. They then developed a story outline in 10 days. As of January 2016, a script for the project had not been written; Benny said the film was in its preliminary phase and might take another year to materialize, considering that both Lal Jose and Mohanlal were busy with other projects. Shortly after, Pauly's film was mothballed and Lal confirmed the "Mohanlal/Lal Jose film" as his next. He described its genre as a "light-hearted humorous movie". The rest of the cast and crew of the film were expected to be fixed as soon as the script was finished.

In February 2016, Lal said Benny "has started the work", and after finishing the writing process the filming would commence in the second half of 2016. The following month, Benny said he would start writing after finishing scripting a Mammootty film scheduled to start in August 2016. Meanwhile, some reports said Mohanlal's role was of a college vice principal in the film. In December 2016, Benny said the film's discussion was progressing and that it dealt with a "subject that has tragedy and will have Mohanlal as a college professor".

In April 2017, it was announced that the first schedule of filming would start by mid-May and the second schedule two months later. More details of Mohanlal's character were revealed: he plays a distant professor of a college and will exhibit two different character looks while passing through two phases of life, but "not [in] a long [time] span"—one will have him in a bearded look and the other clean-shaven. It was reported that Mohanlal would shoot for around a month and will join the second schedule by July, appearing in different looks for each schedule. Some of the cast were confirmed and the rest were being finalized at the time. The title Velipadinte Pusthakam was announced by Mohanlal on 21 May 2017. As of April 2017, filming was scheduled to start on 15 May that year.

=== Casting ===
Lal Jose wanted every character in the film to get due importance; not just the lead character. The names of most of the supporting cast were revealed in April 2017. Anna Rajan, who debuted with Angamaly Diaries, was fixed in the role of Mary, a professor. Benny described her character as "a strict college professor who would be seen as a regular, sari-clad faculty member. We might add a pair of spectacles too to the look, but the final decision will be taken post the look test." Anoop Menon was confirmed in an unspecified role who "appears in the backstory of the film". Also Salim Kumar, Priyanka Nair, Kalabhavan Shajohn, Siddique, Alencier Ley Lopez, Arun Kurian, and Jagan were confirmed at the time in other supporting roles. Arun Kurian plays a college student named Sameer, whom he described as a "gregarious type, a college-going city boy"; Lal Jose had Arun himself in mind for the role.

In June 2017, it was revealed that Anoop would play an old man named Vishwan and would wear more than one costume during the story. Jude Anthany Joseph confirmed his presence in the film in May. Siddique plays Tharakan, a character with villainous shades. He said his character "has an issue with the college authorities and the students. He is miffed at the owner, who has allotted the land to build the college." Sarath Kumar portrays a character named Franklin from a fisherman's family, who is a popular guy on campus. Salim Kumar plays Premraj, a college professor who loses his position as Vice-principal. Jude plays a student called Vignjanakoshi. Sibish Sudhi plays the college peon. Other characters are played by Shivaji Guruvayoor, Vijay Babu, and Krishna Kumar.

=== Filming ===
Principal photography began with a puja function on 17 May 2017 at St. Xavier's College, Thumba in Thiruvananthapuram, Kerala. The crew planted saplings in the college premises before commencing filming. Almost 40 days of filming were scheduled in the college. Mohanlal joined the sets on 25 May 2017. He spent 23 days of filming in this schedule. The crew reached Muthalapozhi beach in Thiruvananthapuram on 2 June 2017 to film a beach volleyball scene that was interrupted by rain and was filmed later in the week. The place where Micheal consults a lawyer was filmed in a house named Magistrate Bangalow in Menamkulam; the scene was filmed in less than a day.

Anoop joined the crew in early June 2017. Mohanlal continued filming until 8 June. He took a break from the schedule to film Villain and rejoined the sets of Velipadinte Pusthakam on 18 June. Some of the scenes were filmed in Ponmudi. Filming continued in Thiruvananthapuram region until late June 2017. It took 42 days to complete the schedule.

The second schedule began in Alappuzha district on 9 July 2017, and was expected to last for two weeks. Some flashback scenes were shot at Cherthala. Nimesh Thanoor was the art director. Some sets were constructed beside Kattoor beach in Alappuzha district; including Vishwan's house—which was built in 15 days—a nearby temple, and a workshop. Mohanlal filmed for 10 days in this schedule. The filming was completed on 22 July 2017; the final scenes were filmed at Arthunkal beach. Post-production began the following day, with the commencement of dubbing in a studio in Kochi.

== Music ==
Velipadinte Pusthakam

Soundtrack album by Shaan Rahman
- Released: 16 August 2017
- Studios: Shaanz Eternal Ray; Noise Head Quarters; Freddy's Audio Video Garage
- Genre: Feature film soundtrack
- Language: Malayalam
- Label: Satyam Audios
- Producer: Shaan Rahman

Shaan Rahman chronology
Meda Meeda Abbayi (2017)	Velipadinte Pusthakam (2017)	Goodalochana (2017)

Shaan Rahman composed the film's original soundtrack and score. The soundtrack album was released digitally by the label Satyam Audios on 16 August 2017. It consists of five songs, which were written by Vayalar Sarath Chandra Varma, Rafeeq Ahamed, Anil Panachooran, Santhosh Varma, and Manu Manjith. The song "Entammede Jimikki Kammal" was first put out through YouTube on 6 August 2017, and the remaining songs were each released within two weeks.

Velipadinte Pusthakam
No.	Title	Writer(s)	Singer(s)	Length
1.	"Entammede Jimikki Kammal"	Anil Panachooran	Vineeth Sreenivasan, Renjith Unni	03:21
2.	"Karayum Kadalum"	Santhosh Varma	M. G. Sreekumar	04:19
3.	"Manpaathakale"	Rafeeq Ahamed	Shaan Rahman	05:12
4.	"Mele Arimulla"	Manu Manjith	Madhu Balakrishnan	03:52
5.	"Neeyum"	Vayalar Sarath Chandra Varma	Madhu Balakrishnan, Vrinda Shameek	04:28

== Release ==
Velipadinte Pusthakam was released in India on 31 August 2017 in over 400 screens, including 210 screens in Kerala alone. The film earned ₹3.72 crore in the opening day at the Kerala box office. It grossed ₹15–20 crore from worldwide Box office.
