= Anil Panachooran =

Indian film lyricist and poet (1969–2021)

- Born: P. U. Anilkumar; 20 November 1969; Kayamkulam, Alappuzha, Kerala, India
- Died: 3 January 2021 (aged 51); Thiruvananthapuram, Kerala, India
- Occupations: Poet; Lyricist; Actor
- Years active: 2005–2021
- Awards: Filmfare Award For Best Lyricist, Asianet Film Awards

Anil Panachooran (20 November 1969 – 3 January 2021) was an Indian lawyer, poet and lyricist, who worked prominently in the Malayalam film industry. Although a lawyer by profession, he wrote more than 200 songs for the Malayalam film industry as a lyricist.

== Filmography ==
List of films and songs
Year	Title	Song
2005	Makalkku	Idavamasa perum Mazha
2007	Arabikkadha	Thaaraka Malarukal
2007	Arabikkadha	Thaane Padum
2007	Arabikkadha	Chora Veena
2007	Arabikkadha	Thirike Njaan Varumenna
2007	Nasraani	Eeran Meghame
2007	Nasraani	Kanana Nizhalin
2007	Kadha Parayumbol	Vyathyasthanamoru
2008	Cycle	Pattunarnuvo
2008	Cycle	Milky Way
2008	Cycle	Varnapainkili
2008	Cycle	Puthiyoreenam
2008	Cycle	Kanaapponnin
2008	Shakespeare M.A Malayalam	Akkam Pakkam
2008	Shakespeare M.A Malayalam	Yavanika
2008	Shakespeare M.A Malayalam	Vedana Paakum
2008	Minnaminnikkoottam	Mizhithammil
2008	Minnaminnikkoottam	Tharajalam
2008	Minnaminnikkoottam	Kadalolam Valsalyam
2008	Minnaminnikkoottam	We Are in Love
2008	Minnaminnikkoottam	Minnaminnikoottam
2008	Maadambi	Jeevithamoru
2008	Parunthu	Poo Mayile
2008	Parunthu	Nee Cheytha Karmmangal
2008	Crazy Gopalan	Yudham Thudangi
2008	Crazy Gopalan	Gopaala Gokulapaala
2008	Crazy Gopalan	Hay Lelo
2009	Winter	Kula Thullum Thalathil
2009	Makante Achan	Othorumichoru
2009	Samayam	Mamaka Kamanayil
2009	Calendar	Chirakarnna Mounam
2009	Calendar	Gandharaajan Poovidarnnu
2009	Calendar	Pachavellam
2009	Calendar	Punarum Puthu Manam
2009	Bhagavaan	Vande Matharam
2009	Passenger	Ormathirivil
2009	Passenger	Passenger
2009	Malayaali	Ponnurulimele
2009	Bhramaram	Annarakanna Vaa
2009	Bhramaram	Kuzhaloothum Poonthennale
2009	Daddy Cool	Kathayoraavarthanam
2009	Loudspeaker	Changazhi Muthumaay
2009	Loudspeaker	Kaattaarinu Thoraathoru
2009	Loudspeaker	Manjinte Maaraala
2009	Duplicate	Irulile
2009	Swantham Lekhakan	Cheruthinkal Thoni
2009	Swantham Lekhakan	Sandhya Prakashame
2009	Kappalu Muthalaali	Rajappa
2009	Kappalu Muthalaali	Ithuvare
2010	Body Guard	Enneyaano
2010	Body Guard	Arikathayaro
2010	Ringtone	Ilamaan Mizhi
2010	3 Chaar Sou Bees	Pathinezhaayaal
2010	3 Chaar Sou Bees	Paadi Paaloottum
2010	3 Chaar Sou Bees	Kochunniyaasaanu
2010	3 Chaar Sou Bees	Ek Doh Three Chaar
2010	3 Chaar Sou Bees	Aadumaan Thodumaan
2010	3 Chaar Sou Bees	Suravanditha
2010	Nallavan	Maayakkanavu
2010	Nallavan	Thoo Mallike
2010	Nallavan	Nallavan
2010	Penpattanam	Neram Pularum
2010	Advocate Lakshmanan – Ladies Only	Aaru Padai
2010	Advocate Lakshmanan – Ladies Only	Azhakin Sreedevi
2010	Chekavar	Poril Theyyaaram
2010	Chekavar	Poonchillayil
2010	Cocktail	Neeyaam Thanalinu
2010	Oridathoru Postman	Pottukuthi Pulariyitha
2010	Oridathoru Postman	Kuzhimadiyaa Kulamadiya
2010	Oru Small Family	Pandu Pandu ...
2010	Oru Small Family	Swantham Swantham
2010	Oru Small Family	Kallu Kudikkan
2010	Marykkundoru Kunjaadu	Kunjaade Kurumbanaade
2010	Marykkundoru Kunjaadu	Changaathikkuyile
2010	Marykkundoru Kunjaadu	Entadukke Vannadukkum
2010	Marykkundoru Kunjaadu	Panchaarachiri Kondu
2011	Payyans	Rout Mari
2011	Payyans	Doore Vazhiyirulukayaayi
2011	Arjunan Saakshi	Unarum
2011	Arjunan Saakshi	Ee Kaanum Naadaka
2011	Note Out	Kudukudu
2011	Note Out	Varumo Meghame
2011	Note Out	Kaala Pettennu
2011	Note Out	Neelakkuyile
2011	City of God	Jeevitham
2011	City of God	Annan
2011	City of God	Kaalangal
2011	City of God	Betaabi
2011	City of God	Annan
2011	City of God	Praayam
2011	City of God	Nee Akaleyaano
2011	China Town	Aaraanu Kootu
2011	China Town	Mohapattam
2011	China Town	Innu Penninnu
2011	China Town	Arike Ninnalum
2011	Maanikyakkallu	Olakkuda Choodunnoru
2011	Maanikyakkallu	Naadaayaaloru
2011	Maanikyakkallu	Chembarathi Kammalittu
2011	Priyappetta Naattukaare	Kannil Kannil Choodum
2011	Priyappetta Naattukaare	Unnam Vidaathe
2011	Priyappetta Naattukaare	Kothiyoorum Nerathu
2011	Priyappetta Naattukaare	Thudiyolam Thulli
2011	Seniors	Ithiri Chakkara Nulli
2011	Sivapuram	Mindaathe Mindunnu
2011	Sivapuram	Ormakalile
2011	Sivapuram	Bhoomiyithu Mukkaal
2012	Kunjaliyan	Kunjaliyaa
2012	Navaagatharkku Swaagatham	Ketto Snehithare
2012	Navaagatharkku Swaagatham	Pokkuveyil
2012	Navaagatharkku Swaagatham	Kaithaalam
2012	Navaagatharkku Swaagatham	Koodunnunde
2012	Padmasree Bharath Dr Saroj Kumar	Kesu Ninte
2012	Padmasree Bharath Dr Saroj Kumar	Iniyoru Chalanam
2012	Padmasree Bharath Dr Saroj Kumar	Mozhikalum
2012	Hero	Nero Nero
2012	Hero	Maayaathe Ormmayil
2012	Grihanaathan	Chinthum Paadi
2012	Thaappaana	Padaykkirangiya Thappana
2012	Thaappaana	Pakida Palavidham
2012	Jawan of Vellimala	Pora Niranjoru Pathira
2012	Mullassery Madhavankutty Nemam PO	Kannaaram Pothi
2012	Mullassery Madhavankutty Nemam PO	Ishta Swapnamee Arikatho
2012	Mullassery Madhavankutty Nemam PO	Kan Thurannoru Kalyani
2012	Nine One Six – 916	Chenthaamara Theno
2012	Poppins	Mohangal Maathram
2012	Poppins	Ninakkaay Maathram
2012	Face to Face	Changaathi Padayum
2013	Entry	Sammaanam
2013	Oru Yaathrayil	Kaatte Kaatte
2013	Nadodimannan	Nadodimannan
2013	Black Ticket	Narunilaathullikal
2013	Black Ticket	Thoraa Raamazha
2013	Weeping Boy	Chema Chema
2013	Weeping Boy	Doore Maanathu
2014	Vikramaadithyan	Oru Kodi Thaarangale
2014	8:20	Ennumen Karalile
2015	Female Unnikrishnan	Konchathe Konchenam
2015	Kidney Biriyani	Kanavin Naal
2015	Kidney Biriyani	Koodum Thedi
2015	Kidney Biriyani	Thedi Thedi Poke
2015	Rajamma@Yahoo	Ullathu Chonnaal
2015	Rajamma@Yahoo	Ottakkuyilinte Mounam
2015	Rajamma@Yahoo	Kurishinte Chillayil
2016	Hello Namasthe	Hello Namasthe
2016	Yaathra Chodikkaathe	Oru Kudanna Kanneer
2016	Yaathra Chodikkaathe	Chakravalathinte
2016	Kammaara Sambhavam	Anjaandu Bharikkaan
2016	Pallikkoodam	Ennum Thoduviral
2016	Maayamaalika	Onnu Thottu
2017	Vilakkumaram	Thithaaro Chirakadichu
2017	Vilakkumaram	Nirame Maayalle
2017	Oru Mexican Apaaratha	Munneraan Samayamaayi
2017	God Say	Chankkaranenthyedaa
2017	Velipaadinte Pusthakam	Entammede Jimikki Kammal
2017	Vaakku	Minuminuthoru
2018	Velakkaariyaayirunnaalum Neeyen Mohavalli	Kannanthalir
2018	Janaadhipan	Enaadi Kallyaani
2018	Janaadhipan	Ninamozhukunu
2018	Janaadhipan	Theepadavu
2018	Thattumpurath Achuthan	Nenchinullilaake
2018	Thattumpurath Achuthan	Vidilla Poonda Kalla
2018	Thattumpurath Achuthan	Mazha Varanunde
2018	Thattumpurath Achuthan	Mangalakaaraka
2019	Kuttymaama	Thallalla Thallalla
2019	Marconi Mathai	Enna Parayana
2019	Prathi Poovan Kozhi	Eninna Enithenna
2019	Prathi Poovan Kozhi	Thondi Thondi
2020	Urriyadi	Thumbappoo Chottil
2020	Urriyadi	Parakkate Velichamengum
2020	Urriyadi	Ellamini Neeye
2020	Urriyadi	Olakkaalu Seelakkaalu
2020	Urriyadi	Kanuvan Kothicha
2020	Urriyadi	Jayathe Jayathe
2023	Within Seconds	Kasthoori Kattoothi

*He penned his last lyrics for the movie Within Seconds(2021).

== Acting Credits ==
Arabikkatha as Poet (also singer and lyricist)

== Death ==
While undergoing treatment for COVID-19 during the COVID-19 pandemic in India, he died on 3 January 2021, following a cardiac arrest. Upon his death, relatives demanded a postmortem and police later registered a case of unnatural death.

== Awards ==
- Asianet Film award for best Lyricist 2008- Arabikadha, Kadha Parayumbol
- Filmfare award for best Lyricist 2008

== See also ==
- Malayalam literature
- List of Malayalam-language authors
