= Alphons Joseph =

Indian music director and composer

- Born: 8 July 1973 (age 53)
- Origin: Thrissur, Kerala
- Genres: Film score
- Occupations: Composer, Music Director, Singer, Instrumentalist, Voice Trainer
- Instruments: Guitar, Vocals
- Years active: 2003–present
- Member of: Rexband
- Website: Official Website

Alphons Joseph is an Indian music director and playback singer who works in Malayalam film industry. He debuted with 2003 movie Vellithira. Alphons is also noted for singing "Aaromale" from the film Vinnaithaandi Varuvaayaa, which was composed by A. R. Rahman.

== Discography ==
List of film scores and soundtracks composed
Year	Film	Score	Songs	Notes
2003	Vellithira	Yes	Yes	
2004	Manjupoloru Penkutti	Yes	Yes	
2004	Jalolsavam		Yes	
2005	Iruvattam Manavatti		Yes	
2005	Makalkku	Yes		
2007	Athishayan	Yes	Yes	
2007	Big B		Yes	
2007	Black Cat	Yes	Yes	One song only
2008	Pachamarathanalil	Yes	Yes	
2008	Aayudham		Yes	One song only
2010	Aathmakatha		Yes	
2010	Cocktail		Yes	Two songs only
2010	Elektra	Yes	Yes	
2011	Payyans		Yes	
2011	Seniors		Yes	One song and Drama theme music
2011	Uppukandam Brothers Back in Action		Yes	
2012	Asuravithu		Yes	
2012	Casanovva		Yes	Two songs only
2012	Cinema Company	Yes	Yes	
2013	Pranayakadha	Yes	Yes	Two songs only
2014	Kathai Thiraikathai Vasanam Iyakkam		Yes	One song only
2015	Akkaldhamayile Pennu	Yes	Yes	
2019	Lonappante Mamodeesa	Yes	Yes	
2020	Varane Avashyamund	Yes	Yes	
2022	Panthrandu	Yes	Yes	
2022	Sundari Gardens	Yes	Yes	
2023	The Face of the Faceless	Yes	Yes	
2023	Live	Yes	Yes	

=== Playback singer ===
Year	Song	Film	Composer
2003	"Velichathin Vellithooval"	Vellithira	Himself
2005	"Kanneeril Pidayum"	Iruvattam Manavatti	Himself
2007	"Oru Vakkum"	Big B	Himself
2010	"Aaromale"	Vinnaithaandi Varuvaayaa	A. R. Rahman
2010	"Aaromale"	Ye Maaya Chesave	A. R. Rahman
2010	"Pontharakame"	Aathmakatha	Himself
2010	"Vennilavinumivide"	Cocktail	Himself
2010	"Lets Dance"	Elektra	Himself
2010	"Ormathan"	Thriller	Dharan
2010	"Angine Angine"	Puthumukhangal	Shyam Dharman
2011	"Doore Vazhiyirulukayaayi"	Payyans	Himself
2012	"Aaromale"	Ekk Deewana Tha	A. R. Rahman
2012	"Engo Odugindrai"	Pizza	Santhosh Narayanan
2012	"Nee Yeppo Pulla"	Kumki	D Imman
2013	"Yaarukkum Thozhan Illai"	Thanga Meengal	Yuvan Shankar Raja
2013	"Chilena Oru Mazhaithuli"	Raja Rani	G. V. Prakash Kumar
2013	"Doore"	Kaanchi	Ronnie Raphael
2013	"Spirit of Amen"	Amen	Prashant Pillai
2014	"Ekkachakkay"	Kappal	Natarajan
2014	"Kaatril Kathai Irukku"	Kathai Thiraikathai Vasanam Iyakkam	Himself
2014	"Thamizhukku en Ondrei Azhuthavum"	Tamizhuku En Ondrai Azhuthavum	Thaman
2014	"Mayako"	Asurakulam	C. Sathya
2015	"Mananivalude"	Rajamma @ Yahoo	Bijibal
2015	"Aazhi Alai Neerum"	Vizhithiru	Sathyan Mahalingam
2017	"Emitemitemo"	Arjun Reddy	Radhan
2018	"My World is Flying"	Hello Guru Premakosame	Devi Sri Prasad
2020	"Mathi kanna"	Varane Aavashyamundu	Himself
2022	"Mayamoham"	Sundari Gardens	Himself
2022	"Ponni Nadhi (Malayalam)"	Ponniyin Selvan	A R Rahman
2023	"Parakkum Parava Poley"	Otta	M. Jayachandran

=== Other works ===
- 2010 Commonwealth Games Theme song (Kerala State version)
- 2011 Composed music for Medical research project Music for the foetus.

== Awards and recognitions ==
- Alphons was awarded the 2004 Film Critics Award - Best Music Director award for the movie Jalolsavam.
- 2011 Amrita TV FEFKA Film Awards – Best Music Director award for the songs of the movie "Atmakadha".
- 2011 Vijay TV Music Awards – Best Debut Singer award for the song Aaromale.
- 2011 L-Channel Film & TV Awards – Best Music Director award for the songs of "Cocktail".
- 2011 Pala Communications Yuva Prathibha Awards – For all the achievements in the year 2010.
- 2011 Radio mirchi music Awards – Best Singer Nomination' for VTV Song Aaromale.
- 2024 Zepstone Arts Festival International Film Awards – Best Music Score awardfor the movie the Face of the Faceless .
