= List of accolades received by Premam =

Accolades
Award	Won	Nominated
Asianet Comedy Awards	3	3
Asianet Film Awards	6	6
Asiavision Awards	4	4
CPC Cine Awards	2	2
Filmfare Awards South	2	7
IBNLive Movie Awards	1	3
IIFA Utsavam	4	9
Mirchi Music Awards South	1	4
North American Film Awards	1	1
South Indian International Movie Awards	7	15
Vanitha Film Awards	6	6
- Total number of awards and nominations (Note: Awards in certain categories do not have prior nominations and only winners are announced by the jury. For simplification and to avoid errors, each award in this list has been presumed to have had a prior nomination.)
Totals	37	60
- References

Premam is a 2015 Indian Malayalam-Tamil languages coming-of-age musical romantic drama film written, edited, and directed by Alphonse Puthren. It was produced by Anwar Rasheed under his production company, Anwar Rasheed Entertainment. The film features Nivin Pauly and Sai Pallavi in the lead roles. The soundtrack and score were composed by Rajesh Murugesan, while the cinematography was handled by Anand C. Chandran. The plot follows love life of George David (Nivin) from teenage to adulthood in three stages. The film was also remade in Telugu in 2016 with the same name.

Produced on a budget of ₹40 million, Premam was released on 29 May 2015 and grossed ₹600 million. The film was included in The Hindu's top 25 Malayalam-language films of the decade. The film garnered awards and nominations in several categories, with particular praise for its direction, screenplay, Nivin and Pallavi's performance, music, cinematography, and editing. The film won 37 awards from 60 nominations.

At the 63rd Filmfare Awards South, Premam was nominated in seven categories, winning Best Female Debut (Sai Pallavi) and Best Male Playback Singer (Vijay Yesudas for "Malare"). At the 5th South Indian International Movie Awards it received fifteen nominations and won seven, including those for Best Film, Best Director, Best Music Director, Best Lyricist, Best Male Playback Singer (Vijay Yesudas). Nivin and Sai Pallavi won the Best Actor Critics and Best Debut Actress awards respectively. At the 1st IIFA Utsavam it received nine nominations and won four, including those for Best Performance in a Comic Role, Best Music Direction, Best Lyricist and Best Male Playback Singer. Among other wins, the film received six Asianet Film Awards, six Vanitha Film Awards, three Asianet Comedy Awards, four Asiavision Awards and two CPC Cine Awards. But the movie was not considered by the Kerala State Film Awards, which is official state film award given by Government of Kerala.

== Awards and nominations ==
Award (Note: Awards, festivals and organizations are in Alphabetical order.)	Date of ceremony (Note: Date is linked to the article about the awards held that year, wherever possible.)	Category	Recipient(s)	Result	Ref.
Asianet Comedy Awards	13 November 2015	Best Comedy Pair	Soubin Shahir & Vinay Forrt	Won	
Asianet Comedy Awards	13 November 2015	Best Comedy Dialogue	Sharaf U Dheen	Won	
Asianet Comedy Awards	13 November 2015	Best Comical Scene Song	Shabareesh Varma, Rajesh Murugesan	Won	
Asianet Film Awards	7 February 2016	Most Popular Film	Premam	Won	
Asianet Film Awards	7 February 2016	Popular Malayalam Actor	Nivin Pauly	Won	
Asianet Film Awards	7 February 2016	Best Director	Alphonse Puthren	Won	
Asianet Film Awards	7 February 2016	Best Music Director	Rajesh Murugesan	Won	
Asianet Film Awards	7 February 2016	Best Singer – Male	Vijay Yesudas ("Malare")	Won	
Asianet Film Awards	7 February 2016	Special Jury Award	Sai Pallavi	Won	
Asiavision Movie Awards	2 December 2015	Best Popular Movie	Premam	Won	
Asiavision Movie Awards	2 December 2015	Man Of The Year	Nivin Pauly	Won	
Asiavision Movie Awards	2 December 2015	Sensational Actor Of The Year	Sai Pallavi	Won	
Asiavision Movie Awards	2 December 2015	Best Singer – Male	Vineeth Sreenivasan ("Aluva Puzha")	Won	
CPC Cine Awards	9 March 2016	Best Movie	Alphonse Puthren (Premam)	Won	
CPC Cine Awards	9 March 2016	Best Music Director	Rajesh Murugesan	Won	
Filmfare Awards South	18 June 2016	Best Film – Malayalam	Premam	Nominated	
Filmfare Awards South	18 June 2016	Best Director – Malayalam	Alphonse Puthren	Nominated	
Filmfare Awards South	18 June 2016	Best Actor – Malayalam	Nivin Pauly	Nominated	
Filmfare Awards South	18 June 2016	Best Female Debut – Malayalam	Sai Pallavi	Won	
Filmfare Awards South	18 June 2016	Best Music Director – Malayalam	Rajesh Murugesan	Nominated	
Filmfare Awards South	18 June 2016	Best Lyricist – Malayalam	Shabareesh Varma ("Malare")	Nominated	
Filmfare Awards South	18 June 2016	Best Male Playback Singer – Malayalam	Vijay Yesudas ("Malare")	Won	
IBNLive Movie Awards	7 March 2016	Best Film (South)	Premam	Nominated	
IBNLive Movie Awards	7 March 2016	Best Southern Director	Alphonse Puthren	Nominated	
IBNLive Movie Awards	7 March 2016	Best Southern Debut	Sai Pallavi	Won	
IIFA Utsavam	24—25 January 2016	Best Picture	Premam	Nominated	
IIFA Utsavam	24—25 January 2016	Best Director	Alphonse Puthren	Nominated	
IIFA Utsavam	24—25 January 2016	Performance In A Negative Role	Alphonse Puthren	Nominated	
IIFA Utsavam	24—25 January 2016	Performance In A Leading Role – Male	Nivin Pauly	Nominated	
IIFA Utsavam	24—25 January 2016	Performance In A Supporting Role – Female	Madonna Sebastian	Nominated	
IIFA Utsavam	24—25 January 2016	Best Performance In A Comic Role	Vinay Forrt	Won	
IIFA Utsavam	24—25 January 2016	Best Music Direction	Rajesh Murugesan	Won	
IIFA Utsavam	24—25 January 2016	Best Lyrics	Shabareesh Varma ("Malare")	Won	
IIFA Utsavam	24—25 January 2016	Best Playback Singer – Male	Vijay Yesudas ("Malare")	Won	
Mirchi Music Awards South	27 July 2016	Album of the Year	Rajesh Murugesan	Nominated	
Mirchi Music Awards South	27 July 2016	Male Vocalist of the Year	Vijay Yesudas ("Malare")	Nominated	
Mirchi Music Awards South	27 July 2016	Song of the Year	"Malare"	Nominated	
Mirchi Music Awards South	27 July 2016	Listeners Choice Song of the Year	"Malare"	Won	
North American Film Awards	24 July 2016	Best Playback Singer – Male	Vijay Yesudas	Won	
South Indian International Movie Awards	30 June – 1 July 2016	Best Film – Malayalam	Premam	Won	
South Indian International Movie Awards	30 June – 1 July 2016	Best Director – Malayalam	Alphonse Putharen	Won	
South Indian International Movie Awards	30 June – 1 July 2016	Best Actor – Malayalam	Nivin Pauly	Nominated	
South Indian International Movie Awards	30 June – 1 July 2016	Best Actor Critics' Choice – Malayalam	Nivin Pauly	Won	
South Indian International Movie Awards	30 June – 1 July 2016	Best Comedian – Malayalam	Soubin Shahir	Nominated	
South Indian International Movie Awards	30 June – 1 July 2016	Best Comedian – Malayalam	Vinay Forrt	Nominated	
South Indian International Movie Awards	30 June – 1 July 2016	Best Male Debut – Malayalam	Shabareesh Varma	Nominated	
South Indian International Movie Awards	30 June – 1 July 2016	Best Male Debut – Malayalam	Sharaf U Dheen	Nominated	
South Indian International Movie Awards	30 June – 1 July 2016	Best Female Debut – Malayalam	Sai Pallavi	Won	
South Indian International Movie Awards	30 June – 1 July 2016	Best Female Debut – Malayalam	Madonna Sebastian	Nominated	
South Indian International Movie Awards	30 June – 1 July 2016	Best Female Debut – Malayalam	Anupama Parameswaran	Nominated	
South Indian International Movie Awards	30 June – 1 July 2016	Best Music Director – Malayalam	Rajesh Murugesan	Won	
South Indian International Movie Awards	30 June – 1 July 2016	Best Lyricist – Malayalam	Shabareesh Varma ("Malare")	Won	
South Indian International Movie Awards	30 June – 1 July 2016	Best Male Playback Singer – Malayalam	Vijay Yesudas ("Malare")	Won	
South Indian International Movie Awards	30 June – 1 July 2016	Best Male Playback Singer – Malayalam	Vineeth Sreenivasan ("Aluva Puzha")	Nominated	
Vanitha Film Awards	16 February 2016	Popular Film	Premam	Won	
Vanitha Film Awards	16 February 2016	Popular Actor	Nivin Pauly	Won	
Vanitha Film Awards	16 February 2016	Best Newcomer – Actor	Krishna Sankar, Sharaf U Dheen, Shabareesh Varma	Won	
Vanitha Film Awards	16 February 2016	Best Newcomer – Actress	Sai Pallavi	Won	
Vanitha Film Awards	16 February 2016	Best Music Director	Rajesh Murugesan	Won	
Vanitha Film Awards	16 February 2016	Best Singer – Male	Vijay Yesudas ("Malare")	Won	

== See also ==
- List of Malayalam films of 2015
