= Premam (soundtrack) =

2015 soundtrack album by Rajesh Murugesan

Soundtrack album to Premam by Rajesh Murugesan
- Released: 14 February 2015
- Recorded: 2015
- Genre: Feature film soundtrack
- Length: 22:26
- Languages: Malayalam; Tamil
- Label: Muzik 247
- Producer: Rajesh Murugesan

Rajesh Murugesan chronology
Neram (2013)	Premam (2015)	Action Hero Biju (2016)

Premam is the soundtrack album for the 2015 Malayalam film of the same name directed by Alphonse Puthren and starring Nivin Pauly. The original soundtrack and background score were composed by Rajesh Murugesan, who had collaborated with Puthren in the film Neram (2013). Shabareesh Varma, beside singing, wrote the lyrics for eight of the nine songs. One song "Rockaankuthu" which had lyrics written by Pradeep Palarr was sung by Tamil film composer Anirudh Ravichander. The soundtrack album was released by the record label Muzik 247 on 14 February 2015 and topped the charts, with songs "Aaluva Puzha" and "Malare" became instant hits. The album was listed as the Best Malayalam Music Album of the year by Apple Music.

== Development ==
Puthren roped in Rajesh Murugesan as the film's composer in April 2014, following the success of Neram. Unlike many films during the Malayalam new generation have less than five tracks in the album, Puthren insisted that Rajesh compose at least 13–14 tracks for the film, since the narrative of the film is musical and Puthren believed that the songs would have great impact on the film. However, the final track list only had 9 songs. Shabareesh Varma initially wrote one song for the director–composer collaboration's previous film, which was "Pistah". As the track became viral upon release, Puthren roped him as the norm lyricist and asked him to pen eight tracks for the film. Shabareesh started penning the first song, a "gibberish" track for the film in May 2014. Most of his tracks were written at his house in Aluva, where Rajesh and Puthren were present.

Shabareesh commented that some of his film songs seemed to come true in real life. In an interview with Deccan Chronicle, he stated that when he wrote the song "Ithu Puthan Kaalam", he got much money to solve his financial troubles. However, when he wrote the second song "Kaalam Kettupoi", the recording studio due to heavy rains and lightning, but the laptop with the film's songs was safe with the music director Rajesh Murugesan. The track "Scene Contra" was written as the eponymous title song for a short film, and was written within eight minutes. As some of his friends demanded that the song should be used in a film album instead of a short film. Then, Puthren suggested that the song could be used in Premam and Rajesh wrote background orchestration for this purpose.

In September 2014, actor Murali Gopy recorded the song "Kalippu" during the time he worked on singing two songs simultaneously. Similar to "Scene Contra", this song was also recorded for a short film under the title "Kalippu", but following Puthren's suggestions, this song was used in the film. In addition to Shabareesh Varma, screenwriter-cum-lyricist Pradeep Palarr also penned one song titled "Rockaankuthu" recorded by Tamil film composer Anirudh Ravichander.

== Marketing ==
The music album of Premam was launched on 14 February 2015 on the occasion of Valentine's Day through streaming media for digital download. Followed by the digital release, the audio CDs were released through music stores on 28 February, with a record number of CDs sold on the first day of its release. All the audio songs released prior to the film release went viral on the internet. In March 2015, video for the song "Aluva Puzha" sung by Vineeth Sreenivasan was released and became the chart topper. As a marketing strategy the song "Scene Contra" was released later on 5 May and "Malare" was released on YouTube on 6 June. The song received 1 million hits within 14 hours of release and trended on all social networking platforms.

== Reception ==
Writing for The New Indian Express, music critic Vipin Nair noted, "The Neram team's (Alphonse Puthren-Rajesh Murugesan-Shabareesh Varma) sophomore effort in Premam is almost as impressive, but for an occasional let down by the vocal choices". At the annual music review roundup published in The Hindu, Karthik listed Premam as the second best Malayalam soundtrack of 2015, after Charlie (composed by Gopi Sunder). Apple Music selected it as the "Best Malayalam album" of 2015. Sanjith Sreedharan of The Times of India listed the album as the "most popular Malayalam music album of 2015".

== Track listing ==
All lyrics are written by Shabareesh Varma, except "Rockaankuthu" by Pradeep Paalar.

No.	Title	Singer(s)	Length
1.	"Aluva Puzhayude"	Vineeth Sreenivasan	3:03
2.	"Kaalam Kettupoi"	Shabareesh Varma	2:47
3.	"Pathivai Njan"	Shabareesh Varma, Rajesh Murugesan	3:31
4.	"Scene Contra"	Shabareesh Varma	2:26
5.	"Kalippu"	Murali Gopy, Shabareesh Varma	3:02
6.	"Rockaankuthu"	Anirudh Ravichander	3:01
7.	"Malare"	Vijay Yesudas	5:16
8.	"Chinna Chinna"	Ranjith, Aalap Raju	2:18
9.	"Ithu Puthan Kalam"	Shabareesh Varma, Rajesh Murugesan	3:46
Total length:			22:26

== Chart performance ==
Chart (2015)	Peak position	Reference
Indian Music Charts	1	

Singles Chart(s) (2015)	Song title	Peak position	Reference
Radio Mirchi South	Aluva Puzha	1	
Radio Mirchi South	Malare	1	

== Other versions ==
For the Telugu remake of this film under the same name, Murugesan remade four of his songs into Telugu, with "Evare" (the Telugu remake of the original song "Malare") retained its singer Vijay Yesudas, for the version.

== Awards ==
Award (Note: Awards, festivals and organizations are in Alphabetical order.)	Date of ceremony (Note: Date is linked to the article about the awards held that year, wherever possible.)	Category	Recipient(s)	Result	Ref.
Asianet Film Awards	7 February 2016	Best Music Director	Rajesh Murugesan	Won	
Asianet Film Awards	7 February 2016	Best Singer – Male	Vijay Yesudas for "Malare"	Won	
Asiavision Movie Awards	2 December 2015	Best Singer – Male	Vineeth Sreenivasan for "Aluva Puzha"	Won	
CPC Cine Awards	9 March 2016	Best Music Director	Rajesh Murugesan	Won	
Filmfare Awards South	18 June 2016	Best Music Director – Malayalam	Rajesh Murugesan	Nominated	
Filmfare Awards South	18 June 2016	Best Lyricist – Malayalam	Shabareesh Varma for "Malare"	Nominated	
Filmfare Awards South	18 June 2016	Best Male Playback Singer – Malayalam	Vijay Yesudas for "Malare"	Won	
IIFA Utsavam	24—25 January 2016	Best Music Direction	Rajesh Murugesan	Won	
IIFA Utsavam	24—25 January 2016	Best Lyrics	Shabareesh Varma for "Malare"	Won	
IIFA Utsavam	24—25 January 2016	Best Playback Singer – Male	Vijay Yesudas for "Malare"	Won	
Mirchi Music Awards South	27 July 2016	Album of the Year	Rajesh Murugesan	Nominated	
Mirchi Music Awards South	27 July 2016	Male Vocalist of the Year	Vijay Yesudas for "Malare"	Nominated	
Mirchi Music Awards South	27 July 2016	Song of the Year	"Malare"	Nominated	
Mirchi Music Awards South	27 July 2016	Listeners Choice Song of the Year	"Malare"	Won	
North American Film Awards	24 July 2016	Best Playback Singer – Male	Vijay Yesudas	Won	
South Indian International Movie Awards	30 June – 1 July 2016	Best Music Director – Malayalam	Rajesh Murugesan	Won	
South Indian International Movie Awards	30 June – 1 July 2016	Best Lyricist – Malayalam	Shabareesh Varma for "Malare"	Won	
South Indian International Movie Awards	30 June – 1 July 2016	Best Male Playback Singer – Malayalam	Vijay Yesudas for "Malare"	Won	
South Indian International Movie Awards	30 June – 1 July 2016	Best Male Playback Singer – Malayalam	Vineeth Sreenivasan for "Aluva Puzha"	Nominated	
Vanitha Film Awards	16 February 2016	Best Music Director	Rajesh Murugesan	Won	
Vanitha Film Awards	16 February 2016	Best Singer – Male	Vijay Yesudas for "Malare"	Won	
