= Gold (2022 Indian film) =

2022 Indian film

- First look poster
- Directed by: Alphonse Puthren
- Written by: Alphonse Puthren
- Produced by: Supriya Menon; Listin Stephen
- Starring: Prithviraj Sukumaran; Nayanthara
- Cinematography: Anend C. Chandran; Viswajith Odukkathil
- Edited by: Alphonse Puthren
- Music by: Rajesh Murugesan
- Production companies: Prithviraj Productions; Magic Frames
- Distributed by: Magic Frames (Kerala); SSI Production (Tamil Nadu)
- Release date: 1 December 2022
- Running time: 165 minutes
- Country: India
- Language: Malayalam

Gold is a 2022 Indian Malayalam-language comedy drama film written, directed and edited by Alphonse Puthren. It was jointly produced by Supriya Menon of Prithviraj Productions and Listin Stephen of Magic Frames. The film stars Prithviraj Sukumaran and Nayanthara, along with an ensemble supporting cast of Deepti Sati, Mallika Sukumaran, Lalu Alex, Ajmal Ameer, Baburaj, Shammi Thilakan, Shanthi Krishna, Jagadish, Krishna Sankar, Roshan Mathew, Vinay Forrt, Shabareesh Varma and Saiju Kurup.

In addition to writing, editing and directing the film, Alphonse also worked on the stunt choreography, visual effects, color grading, and animation titles of the film. It marks his return to direction after seven years since Premam (2015). Principal photography commenced in September 2021 and ended in June 2022.

Initially set for worldwide theatrical release during Onam, in September 2022, it was deferred due to delays in the post-production and eventually opened in theatres on 1 December 2022, where it received mixed-to-negative reviews from critics and became a box-office bomb.

== Plot ==
"Danger" Joshy S Kunjan, who owns a mobile shop, purchases a new car owing to a marriage alliance, that is almost fixed with Radha. However, on the delivery day, Joshy and his mother find that someone has parked a pickup truck with a load of portable speakers. Joshy complains to the police, but they're busy and decide to look into it slowly. The next morning, Joshy discovers that the small boxes inside the truck are not portable speakers, but gold bars painted as speakers. Joshy, who believes that he has struck gold, literally, buys a gold furnace from an acquaintance and melts one speaker. The police arrive to investigate, but decide to leave the truck due to unavailability of ground space in the police station.

Later, Joshy sells one of the gold bar to "Gold" Musthafa for ₹4.5 million and proceeds to buy 20 of the real portable speakers, of the same model as the ones in the truck, intending on switching the real speakers with the gold bars. It is later revealed that the gold was supposed to be dowry for the marriage between Sumangali, daughter of Unnikrishnan, the owner of the shopping complex in which Joshy's mobile shop is situated, and Unnikrishnan's friend, "Idea" Shaji's son, Suneesh. When Unnikrishnan's associate, Usman, was driving for the delivery of the gold, it was ambushed by another gang, headed by Boss Freddy, who learnt about the gold. However, Usman managed to escape and parked the truck in the entrance of Joshy's house, since it was empty that day.

Boss Freddy's men arrive at Joshy's house to silently take the truck away, but Joshy finds and thrashes them. Upon knowing the location of the truck, Sumangali and Unnikrishnan try to retrieve the gold themselves, along with Usman, but to no avail. Joshy's wedding alliance is also called off since Shaji unknowingly admitted to Radha's parents that the complex will be demolished by explosives once it is transferred to Suneesh. Meanwhile, the police make space at the police station and inform Joshy that they will take the truck the next day, in the evening. Unnikrishnan cancels Sumangali's marriage as he learns that Shaji and Suneesh only wanted the dowry and transfer of the shopping complex.

With time running out as only 20 gold bars were switched, Joshy manages to buy 180 portable speakers. He manages to only switch 170 of remaining gold bars, leaving 10 bars in the truck. Later, Sumangali takes over from her father as the owner of the shopping complex, and is later impressed with Joshy when Baazi calls him to ask which mobile phone Sumangali should buy next. 6 months later, Joshy sends a letter to the CM Kalamassery Ajayan, revealing that he delivered ₹850 million of black money to a charity fund anonymously, in order to provide housing to the poor and laptops to students. He took 10% of the total money as tax, and refers to himself as "Gold". It is also revealed that the 10 gold bars which Joshy could not switch, are still inside the truck. Sumangali is also revealed to have an interest in Joshy, but is confused whether to choose Joshy or Gold.

== Cast ==
- Prithviraj Sukumaran as Joshy S. Kunjan, a mobile shop owner
- Nayanthara as Sumangali Unnikrishnan, Unnikrishnan's daughter
- Deepti Sati as Radha
- Mallika Sukumaran as Latha, Joshy's mother
- Baburaj as CPO Rakesh Manjappra
- Lalu Alex as "Idea" Shaji
- Ajmal Ameer as Suneesh Shaji, Shaji's son
- Shammi Thilakan as Unnikrishnan, Sumangali's father
- Shanthi Krishna as Subhadra, Sumangali's mother
- Jagadish as Head constable Prince
- Krishna Sankar as Bhasi, Joshy's mobile shop manager
- Shabareesh Varma as CPO Girish
- Chemban Vinod Jose as Boss Freddy
- Vinay Forrt as Jumper Santhosh
- Roshan Mathew as Manu, new-gen gunda
- Saiju Kurup as Jomon, Joshy's mechanic friend
- Suresh Krishna as CI Pluto Augustin
- Abu Salim and Sandeep Varma as Timber Brothers
- Althaf Salim as Velukkuttan, Jomon's assistant
- Prem Kumar as Anto Chettan
- Sudheesh as Gold Musthafa
- Idavela Babu as Chacko, Shop owner
- Sharaf U Dheen as Richard, Driver
- Jaffar Idukki as Babu, Marriage Broker
- Thesni Khan as News reader
- Shebin Benson as Sonny, a Day Band member
- Siju Wilson as Gilbert, Day Band Leader
- Justin John as JJ
- Faisal Muhammed as Faiz
- M. A. Shiyas as Baby Kunju
- Vineeth Thattil David as Usman
- Sabumon as Biju, Usman's friend
- Sibu Thankachan as Pappan, Auto driver
- George Abraham as Speeder Jinto
- Alphonse Puthren as "Spider" Suresh
- Aleena Alphonse Puthren as Mareena
- Soubin Shahir as Mittu
- Ganapathi S. Poduval as Jaffar
- Sai Kumar as Kalamassery Ajayan, Chief Minister of Kerala
- Sharat Saxena as Major General Singhania
- Renji Panicker as Chandrashekharan
- Parvathi T as Bhavathi
- Anarkali Nassar as Suneesh Shaji's bride

== Production ==
Production began with a pooja ceremony on 8 September 2021. Originally planned to shoot within Kerala, location was shifted outside of Kerala due to COVID-19 pandemic restrictions in the state. Produced by Supriya Menon of Prithviraj Productions and Listin Stephen of Magic Frames. Alphonse was directing a film after a gap of six years since Premam. With a song sequence choreographed by Alphonse's wife Aleena Antony at Fort Kochi, the filming was wrapped up on 14 June 2022. Cinematography was done by Anend C. Chandran and Viswajith Odukkathil. Apart from directing, Alphonse also handled editing, stunt choreography, visual effects, and color grading of the film.

== Soundtrack ==
The music of the film was composed by Alphonse's regular composer Rajesh Murugesan. The soundtrack is distributed by Magic Frames Music. The song "Hands Up Zindagi" contains a reprised version of the Hindi song "Zindagi Ek Safar Hai" from Andaz (1971).

Gold

Soundtrack album by Rajesh Murugesan
- Released: 2022
- Recorded: 2021–2022
- Venues: Chennai, Kochi, Mumbai
- Genre: Feature film soundtrack
- Length: 23:34
- Language: Malayalam
- Label: Magic Frames Music
- Producer: Rajesh Murugesan

Rajesh Murugesan chronology
Pechi (2022)	Gold (2022)

Tracklist
No.	Title	Lyrics	Singer(s)	Length
1.	"Thanne Thanne"	Shabareesh Varma	Vijay Yesudas, Rajesh Murugesan	3:56
2.	"Hands Up Zindagi"	Hasrat Jaipuri, Nadirshah	Shankar–Jaikishan, Padmaja Srinivasan, Rajesh Murugesan, Shabareesh Varma	3:36
3.	"Pulari Unarnnathu Kaanande"	Kaithapram Damodaran Namboothiri	Sujatha Mohan, Rajesh Murugesan	1:45
4.	"Clock Soojigal"		Ranjith Govind, Benny Dayal, Rajesh Murugesan	2:30
5.	"Ural Urulumbo"		Shabareesh Varma, Siju Wilson, Rajesh Murugesan	2:28
6.	"Thanne Thanne - Reprise"	Shabareesh Varma	Rajesh Murugesan	3:57
7.	"Gold Hustle"		K S Abhishek, Rajesh Murugesan	4:19
8.	"Gold Theme"		Rajesh Murugesan	2:23

== Release ==
Initially, the film was scheduled for a theatrical release on 8 September 2022 on the occasion of Onam. Subbiah Shanmughan of SSI Productions distributed the Tamil and Malayalam version of the film in Tamil Nadu. The film completed censoring on 28 November 2022, with a runtime of 2 hours 45 minutes. With that, the release date was announced to be on 1 December 2022. Due to dubbing and censoring delays, the Tamil dubbed version was released only a day later on 2 December 2022. The digital rights of the film were bagged by Amazon Prime Video and satellite rights were sold to Sun TV Network.

== Reception ==
Gold received mixed to negative reviews from critics who praised Prithviraj's performance, but criticized its story, screenwriting, editing and length.

=== Critical response ===
Princy Alexander of Onmanorama appreciated the movie for portraying its brilliance on a man's inner psyche for luxuries in life. If Premam was a love story and Neram focused on a man's tryst with time, Gold definitely does justice to the film's theme. Manoj Kumar. R of The Indian Express gave 3 out of 5 stars and wrote "How do you enjoy an Alphonse Puthren film? By simply being in the moment. If you expect the narrative to take you someplace else, you might be left disappointed. Instead, if you choose to enjoy what the film is offering you at any given moment, you will find entertainment. Like life, in Alphonse's films, it's not the destination but the journey that matters."

OTTplay gave 3 out of 5 stars and wrote "The highlight of Prithviraj Sukumaran's Gold, right from its outset, is its making; Alphonse has carefully conceived and crafted each of the scenes of the film that blends with Rajesh Murugesan's thumping music." Janani. K of India Today gave 2 out of 5 stars and criticized Alphonse's script as "wafer-thin" and "incohesive", but praised Prithviraj's performance by describing him as the "soul" of the film. Anna M. M. Vetticad of Firstpost gave 2 out of 5 stars and wrote, "Despite its flaws, Gold's first half is entertaining. The post-interval downhill slide is so rapid (...) No amount of catchy music, production polish and star wattage can camouflage skin-and-bones writing. Gold plating, after all, is just that – plating."
