= 1st IIFA Utsavam =

2016 Indian Telugu film award ceremony

- Date: 24–25 January 2016
- Site: Gachibowli Athletic Stadium, Hyderabad, Telangana, India
- Hosted by: Allu Sirish; Diganth; Navdeep; Pearle Maaney; Regina Cassandra; Siva; Suraaj; Venkat Prabhu; Vijay Raghavendra

Highlights
- Best Picture: Baahubali: The Beginning (Telugu); Baahubali: The Beginning (Tamil); Ennu Ninte Moideen (Malayalam); RangiTaranga (Kannada)
- Most awards: Baahubali: The Beginning (11)
- Most nominations: Baahubali: The Beginning (25)

Television coverage
- Channel: Gemini TV (Telugu); Sun TV (Tamil); Surya TV (Malayalam); Udaya TV (Kannada)
- Network: Sun TV Network

The 1st IIFA Utsavam ceremony honouring the winners and nominees of the best of South Indian cinema in 2015 was held on 24 and 25 January 2016 at the Gachibowli Athletic Stadium, Hyderabad. Marking the inaugural event of the IIFA Utsavam, it recognised the best cinematic work in Telugu, Tamil, Malayalam and Kannada languages from late 2014 to late 2015 and awarded prizes to performers and technicians.

== Awards and nominees ==
=== Main awards ===
==== Telugu ====
Best Picture	Best Direction
Baahubali: The Beginning; Bhale Bhale Magadivoy; Paathasala; Srimanthudu; Yevade Subramanyam	S. S. Rajamouli – Baahubali: The Beginning; Chandoo Mondeti – Karthikeya; Koratala Siva – Srimanthudu; Mahi V. Raghav – Paathasala; Puri Jagannadh – Temper
Performance in a Leading Role – Male	Performance in a Leading Role – Female
Mahesh Babu – Srimanthudu; Allu Arjun – S/O Satyamurthy; Nani – Bhale Bhale Magadivoy; N. T. Rama Rao Jr – Temper; Prabhas – Baahubali: The Beginning	Shruti Haasan – Srimanthudu; Lakshmi Manchu – Dongaata; Lavanya Tripathi – Bhale Bhale Magadivoy; Nithya Menen – Malli Malli Idi Rani Roju; Tamannaah Bhatia – Baahubali: The Beginning
Performance in a Supporting Role – Male	Performance in a Supporting Role – Female
Jagapati Babu – Srimanthudu; Naveen Chandra – Bham Bolenath; Pawan Kalyan – Gopala Gopala; Posani Krishna Murali – Temper; Sathyaraj – Baahubali: The Beginning	Ramya Krishna – Baahubali: The Beginning; Apoorva Srinivasan – Jyothi Lakshmi; Prachi Thaker – Pataas; Ritu Varma – Yevade Subramanyam; Tulasi – Srimanthudu
Performance in a Comic Role	Performance in a Negative Role
Vennela Kishore – Bhale Bhale Magadivoy; Bhadram – Jyothi Lakshmi; Brahmanandam – Dongaata; Srinivas Reddy – Pataas; Vennela Kishore – Srimanthudu	Rana Daggubati – Baahubali: The Beginning; Ajay Ghosh – Jyothi Lakshmi; Kabir Duhan Singh – Jil; Prabhakar – Dongaata; Sampath Raj – Srimanthudu
Music Direction	Lyrics
Devi Sri Prasad – Srimanthudu; Anup Rubens – Gopala Gopala; Anup Rubens – Temper; Raghu Kunche, Sai Karthik & Satya Mahaveer – Dongaata; M. M. Keeravani – Baahubali: The Beginning	Ramajogayya Sastry – "Rama Rama", "Charuseela" and "Jaago Re" from Srimanthudu; Devi Sri Prasad – "Super Machi" from S/O Satyamurthy; K. Shiva Datta – "Mamathala Thalli" from Baahubali: The Beginning; Ramajogayya Sastry – "O Manishi" from Yevade Subramanyam; Varikuppala Yadagiri – "Yendiro" from Dongaata
Playback Singer – Male	Playback Singer – Female
Sagar – "Jatha Kalise" from Srimanthudu; Deepu – "Dheevara" from Baahubali: The Beginning; Dhanunjay & Haricharan – "Alare Ala" from Gopala Gopala; Karthik – "Enno Enno" from Malli Malli Idi Rani Roju; L. V. Revanth – "Manohari" from Baahubali: The Beginning	Satya Yamini – "Mamatala Talli" from Baahubali: The Beginning; Damini – "Pacha Bottesi" from Baahubali: The Beginning; Geetha Madhuri – "Jeeva Nadhi" from Baahubali: The Beginning; Lakshmi Manchu – "Yendhiro" from Dongaata; Nikhita Gandhi – "Jantar Mantar" from Yevade Subramanyam

==== Tamil ====
Best Picture	Best Direction
Baahubali: The Beginning; Demonte Colony; Enakkul Oruvan; Indru Netru Naalai; Kanchana 2; Thani Oruvan	S. S. Rajamouli – Baahubali: The Beginning; A. R. Murugadoss – Kaththi; Jeethu Joseph – Papanasam; Mohan Raja – Thani Oruvan; Raghava Lawrence – Kanchana 2
Performance in a Leading Role – Male	Performance in a Leading Role – Female
Jayam Ravi – Thani Oruvan; Kamal Haasan – Papanasam; Kamal Haasan – Uttama Villain; Vishal – Paayum Puli; Raghava Lawrence – Kanchana 2; Vignesh – Kaaka Muttai; Vijay – Puli	Nayanthara – Maya; Anushka Shetty – Baahubali: The Beginning; Jyothika – 36 Vayadhinile; Samantha – Thanga Magan; Tamannaah Bhatia – Baahubali: The Beginning; Trisha – Thoongaa Vanam
Performance in a Supporting Role – Male	Performance in a Supporting Role – Female
Sathyaraj – Baahubali: The Beginning; Nassar – Kaaviya Thalaivan; Prabhu – Aambala; Radharavi – Pisaasu; Rajkiran – Komban; VTV Ganesh – Trisha Illana Nayanthara	Ramya Krishnan – Baahubali: The Beginning; Aishwarya Rajesh – Kaaka Muttai; Asha Sarath – Papanasam; Nithya Menen – Kanchana 2; Ramya Krishnan – Aambala
Performance in a Comic Role	Performance in a Negative Role
Kovai Sarala – Kanchana 2; Karunas – Darling; Ramesh Thilak – Kaaka Muttai; Robo Shankar – Maari; Santhanam – Aambala; Thambi Ramaiah – Thani Oruvan	Arvind Swamy – Thani Oruvan; Nassar – Uttama Villain; Prithviraj – Kaaviya Thalaivan; Rana Daggubati – Baahubali: The Beginning
Music Direction	Lyrics
Anirudh Ravichander – Maari; A. R. Rahman – Kaaviya Thalaivan; A. R. Rahman – O Kadhal Kanmani; Anirudh Ravichander – Kaththi; G. V. Prakash Kumar – Kaaka Muttai; M. M. Keeravani – Baahubali: The Beginning	Dhanush – "Don'u Donu'u Don'u" from Maari; Rokesh – "Dungamaari" from Anegan; Vairamuthu – "Malargal Kaetten" from O Kadhal Kanmani; Vairamuthu – "Roja Kadale" from Anegan; Vivek – "Raasathi" from 36 Vayadhinile; Vijay – "Yendi Yendi" from Puli
Playback Singer – Male	Playback Singer – Female
Haricharan – "Manohari" from Baahubali: The Beginning; A. R. Rahman – "Mental Manadhil" from O Kadhal Kanmani; Anirudh Ravichander – "Donu Donu Donu" from Maari; Deepu – "Dheerane" from Baahubali: The Beginning; Dhanush, Gana Viji & Naveen Madhav – "Dangamaari" from Anegan; Haricharan – "Sandi Kuthirai" from Kaaviya Thalaivan	Geetha Madhuri – "Jeeva Nadhi" from Baahubali: The Beginning; Bhavatharini – "Aathadi Aathadi" from Anegan; Darshana & Shashaa Tirupati – "Kaara Aatakaara" from O Kadhal Kanmani; Lalitha Vijayakumar – "Raasathi" from 36 Vayadhinile; Sunidhi Chauhan- "Selfie Pulla" from Kaththi; Swetha Mohan – "Yaarumilla" from Kaaviya Thalaivan

==== Malayalam ====
Best Picture	Best Direction
Ennu Ninte Moideen; Iyobinte Pusthakam; Nee-Na; Premam; Varsham	Lal Jose – Nee-Na; Alphonse Putharen – Premam; Amal Neerad – Iyobinte Pusthakam; R. S. Vimal – Ennu Ninte Moideen; Santhosh Viswanath – Chirakodinja Kinavukal
Performance in a Leading Role – Male	Performance in a Leading Role – Female
Prithviraj – Ennu Ninte Moideen; Fahadh Faasil – Iyobinte Pusthakam; Jayasurya – Kumbasaram; Mammootty – Varsham; Nivin Pauly – Premam; Vijay Babu – Nee-Na	Parvathy Thiruvothu – Ennu Ninte Moideen; Amala Paul – Mili; Anusree Nair – Ithihasa; Deepti Sati – Nee-Na; Manju Warrier – Ennum Eppozhum; Padmapriya – Iyobinte Pusthakam
Performance in a Supporting Role – Male	Performance in a Supporting Role – Female
Aju Varghese – Oru Vadakkan Selfie; Chemban Vinod Jose – Nee-Na; Saiju Kurup – Aadu; Sai Kumar – Ennu Ninte Moideen; Soubin Shahir – Chandrettan Evideya; Tovino Thomas – Ennu Ninte Moideen	Lena – Ennu Ninte Moideen; Ann Augustine – Nee-Na; K. P. A. C. Lalitha – Loham; Madonna Sebastian – Premam; Namitha Pramod – Chandrettan Evideya; Srinda Arhaan – Chirakodinja Kinavukal
Performance in a Comic Role	Performance in a Negative Role
Vinay Forrt – Premam; Aju Varghese – Kunjiramayanam; Aju Varghese – Oru Vadakkan Selfie; Chemban Vinod Jose – Chandrettan Evideya; Chemban Vinod Jose – Iyobinte Pusthakam; Soubin Shahir – Premam	Jayasurya – Iyobinte Pusthakam; Alphonse Putharen – Premam; Bala – Ennu Ninte Moideen; Kunchacko Boban – Chirakodinja Kinavukal; Renji Panicker – Ennum Eppozhum; Vijay Babu – Double Barrel
Music Direction	Lyrics
Rajesh Murugesan – Premam; Gopi Sunder, M. Jayachandran, Ramesh Narayan – Ennu Ninte Moideen; Nikhil J. Menon – Nee-Na; Neha Nair & Yakzan Gary Pereira – Iyobinte Pusthakam; Rahul Raj – Kohinoor	Shabareesh Varma – "Malare" from Premam; B. K. Harinarayanan – "Hemanthamen" from Kohinoor; Muhammad Maqbool Mansoor – "Mukkatth Penne" from Ennu Ninte Moideen; Rafeeq Ahammed – "Kathirunnu" from Ennu Ninte Moideen; Venugopal – "Then Nila" from Nee-Na
Playback Singer – Male	Playback Singer – Female
Vijay Yesudas – "Malare" from Premam; Muhammad Maqbool Mansoor – "Mukkatth Penne" from Ennu Ninte Moideen; Vijay Yesudas – "Kannondu Chollanu" from Ennu Ninte Moideen; Vijay Yesudas – "Hemanthanen" from Kohinoor; Vijay Yesudas – "Hridayathin Niramayi" from 100 Days of Love	Shreya Ghoshal – "Kathirunnu" from Ennu Ninte Moideen; Mridula Warrier – "Hridayathin Niramayi" from 100 Days of Love; Neha Nair – "Mane" and "Ravu" from Iyobinte Pusthakam; Preethi Pillai – "Vasanthamalike" from Chandrettan Evideya; Vaikom Vijayalakshmi- "Kaikkottum Kandittila" from Oru Vadakkan Selfie

==== Kannada ====
Best Picture	Best Direction
RangiTaranga; Aatagara; Kendasampige; Krishna Leela; Love in Mandya; Mr. and Mrs. Ramachari; Naanu Avanalla...Avalu	Anup Bhandari – RangiTaranga; Arasu Anthare – Love in Mandya; B. S. Lingadevaru- Naanu Avanalla...Avalu; Santhosh Ananddram – Mr. and Mrs. Ramachari; Shashank – Krishna Leela
Performance in a Leading Role – Male	Performance in a Leading Role – Female
Yash – Mr. and Mrs. Ramachari; Ajay Rao – Krishna Leela; Nirup Bhandari – RangiTaranga; Sanchari Vijay – Naanu Avanalla...Avalu; Sathish Ninasam – Love in Mandya	Radhika Pandit – Mr. and Mrs. Ramachari; Aishani Shetty – Vaastu Prakaara; Mayuri Kyatari – Krishna Leela; Radhika Chetan – RangiTaranga; Sindhu Lokanath – Love in Mandya
Performance in a Supporting Role – Male	Performance in a Supporting Role – Female
Sai Kumar – RangiTaranga; Achyuth Kumar – Mr. and Mrs. Ramachari; Anant Nag – Aatagara; Master Manjunath – Love in Mandya; Rangayana Raghu – Krishna Leela	Lakshmi Raj – Krishna Leela; Anu Prabhakar – Aatagara; Malavika Avinash – Mr. and Mrs. Ramachari; Renuka – RangiTaranga; Sudha Rani – Vaastu Prakaara
Performance in a Comic Role	Performance in a Negative Role
Sadhu Kokila – Mr. and Mrs. Ramachari; Achyuth Kumar – Krishna Leela; Karthik Rao – RangiTaranga; Master Manjunath – Love in Mandya; Rangayana Raghu – Rana Vikrama	Arvind Rao – RangiTaranga; Dharmendra Urs – Krishna Leela; Madhu Guruswamy – Vajrakaya; Prakash Belawadi – Kendasampige; Suchendra Prasad – Raja Rajendra
Music Direction	Lyrics
Anup Bhandari – RangiTaranga; Anoop Seelin – Aatagara; Anoop Seelin – Love in Mandya; Sridhar V. Sambharam – Krishna Leela; V. Harikrishna – Mr. and Mrs. Ramachari; V. Harikrishna – Ranna	Anup Bhandari – "Kareyole" from RangiTaranga; Jayanth Kaikini – "Nenape Nithya Mallige" from Kendasampige; Rohith Padaki – "Tarammayya" from Aatagara; Santhosh Ananddram – "Yaaralli" from Mr. and Mrs. Ramachari; Shashank – "Kaadiruve Ninagagi" from Krishna Leela
Playback Singer – Male	Playback Singer – Female
Dhanush – "No Problem" from Vajrakaya; Anoop Seelin – "Halooralli" from Aatagara; Anoop Seelin – "Opkondbitlu Kanla" from Love in Mandya; Shashank Sheshagiri – "Maathadro" from Krishna Leela; Tippu – "Krishna Calling" from Krishna Leela	Shreya Ghoshal – "Upavaasa" from Mr. and Mrs. Ramachari; Apoorva Sridhar – "Krishna Calling" from Krishna Leela; Inchara Rao – "Kareyole" from RangiTaranga; Shweta Mohan – " Kanasali Nadesu" from Kendasampige; Supriya Lohith – "Tarammayya" from Aatagara

=== Other awards ===
- Special Award: K. Balachander
- Best Cinematographer (Malayalam): Amal Neerad (Iyobinte Pusthakam)
- Best Production Designer (Tamil): Sabu Cyril (Baahubali: The Beginning)
- Best Background Music (Kannada): B. Ajaneesh Loknath (Rangitaranga)
- Best Sound Mixing: Murali Rayasam (Rangitaranga)
