= Oru Vadakkan Pranaya Parvam =

- Directed by: Vijesh Chembilode; Rishi Suresh
- Written by: Vijesh Chembilode
- Produced by: Rajesh; Vijesh; Mahesh
- Starring: Sooraj Sun; Shabareesh Varma; Anjana Prakash; Vineeth Vishwam
- Cinematography: Pramod K. Pillai
- Edited by: Thahir Hamsa
- Music by: Gichu Joy; Harimurali Unnikrishnan
- Production company: A-One Cine Food Productions
- Release date: 9 May 2025
- Country: India
- Language: Malayalam

Oru Vadakkan Pranaya Parvam (transl. A Northern chapter of love) is a 2025 Indian Malayalam-language drama film written and directed by Vijesh Chembilode and Rishi Suresh. This film stars Sooraj Sun, Shabareesh Varma, and Anjana Prakash in lead roles.

== Cast ==
- Sooraj Sun
- Shabareesh Varma
- Anjana Prakash
- Vineeth Vishwam
- Jenson Alappat
- Kaarthik Shankar
- Sreekanth Vettiyar
- Kunhikrishnan
- Kumar Sunil
- Rajesh Paravoor
- Shivaji Guruvayoor
- Dayyana Hameed
- Anupama V. P.
