= Asianet Comedy Awards =

- Awarded for: Awards for excellence in Malayalam cinema & Television
- Country: India
- Presented by: Asianet TV Channel
- First award: 2015
- Website: Asianet Comedy Awards

Asianet Comedy Awards is an award ceremony for Malayalam television and films presented by Asianet. The awards are given for the actors who made excellence in the comedic roles. The awards are normally presented annually and held in Adlux International Convention Center, Angamaly. Meera and Jewel Mary hosted the show in 2015 and 2016. Pearle Maaney and Meera hosted the show in 2017.

== Award's list 2017 ==
- Best Movie - Varnyathil Aashanka
- Best Director -Raffi
- Best Actor-Jayaram (Achayans)
- Best Actress - Aparna Balamurali (Sunday Holiday)
- Popular Actor - Biju Menon (Rakshadhikari Baiju Oppu)
- Popular Actress - Miya
- Popular movie -
- Best Song - Thechille Penne (Role Models)
- Best Script -
- Versatile Actor - Kunchako Boban (Varnyathil Aashanka, Ramante Edenthottam)
- Evergreen Golden Star - Sreenivasan
- Comedy Icon - Salim Kumar
- Youth Icon -Tovino Thomas (Godha, Oru Mexican Aparatha)
- Star performer of the year - Renji Panicker (Godha)
- Best Combo -Aju Varghese, Neeraj Madhav (Lava Kusha)
- Supporting Actor - Lal (Chunkzz)
- Most Promising Actor - Sshivada (Achayans), Aditi Ravi (Alamara), Aishwarya Lekshmi (Njandukalude Naatil Oridavela)
- All Rounder of the Year - Soubin Shahir
- Entertainer of the year -
- Child Artist -
- Entertainer of the Year - Asif Ali
- All-time favorite of Media (TV) - Suraj Venjaramoodu
- Best Actor (TV) - Payyans Jayakumar
- Best Actress (TV) - Archana Suseelan
- Best Anchor -
- Versatile Performer – TV - Arya Rohit and Akhil
- Top TV Performer - Suraj Venjaramoodu

== Award's list 2016 ==
- Best Movie - Two Countries
- Best Director - Abrid Shine
- Best Actor - Dileep
- Best Actress - Mamta Mohandas
- Popular Actor - Jayasurya
- Popular Movie - Pretham
- Best Song - Suresh Thampanoor
- Best Script - Syam Pushkaran
- Versatile Actor - Siddique
- Evergreen Favorite Star - Mukesh
- Comedy Icon - Aju Varghese
- Supporting Actor - Pradeep Kottayam
- Most Promising Actor - Saju Navodaya
- All Rounder of the Year - Vineeth Sreenivasan
- Entertainer of the year - Kalabhavan Shajon
- Child Artist - Akshara Kishore
- Multifaceted Talent - Suraj Venjaramoodu
- Best Actor (TV) - Anoop Chandran
- Best Actress (TV) - Beena Antony
- Best Anchor - Kishore
- Versatile Performer – TV - Dharmajan Bolgatty
- Top TV Performer - Rimi Tomy
- Special Jury Award - Saji Venkulam

== Awards list 2015 ==
- Life Time Glory Award : Janardhanan
- Life Time Achievement Award : Jagathy Sreekumar
- Best Actor : Jayaram
- Best Actress : Anusree
- Youth Icon: Aju Varghese
- Popular Movie : Jamna Pyari
- Multifaceted Talent : Mukesh for Badai bungalow
- Versatile Comedian : Jagadeesh
- Comedy Movie : Chandrettan Evideya
- Best Director : Siddique
- Comedy Pair : Vinay Forrt & Soubin Shahir
- Best Writer Comical Scene : Shabareesh Varma, Rajesh Murugesan for Premam
- Best Comedy Skit : Santhosh
- Best actor (TV)- Kottayam Rasheed for Sthreedhanam
- Best actress (TV) -Kanya Bharathi for Chandanamazha
- Newface (TV & Film ):Nobi
- Comedy Dialogue : Sharaf U Dheen
- Best Presenter : Ramesh Pisharody for badai bungalow

== See also ==
- List of Asian television awards
