= Ladoo (film) =

- Poster
- Directed by: Arungeorge K David
- Written by: Sagar Satyan
- Produced by: S. Vinod Kumar
- Starring: Vinay Forrt; Shabareesh Varma; Balu Varghese; Dileesh Pothan
- Cinematography: Gautham Sankar
- Edited by: Lalkrishnan S. Achuthan
- Music by: Rajesh Murugesan
- Production company: Mini Studio
- Distributed by: Wunderbar Films
- Release date: 17 November 2018
- Country: India
- Language: Malayalam

Ladoo is a 2018 Indian Malayalam-language romantic comedy film directed by debutant Arungeorge K. David, written by Sagar Sathyan and produced by S Vinod Kumar for Mini Studio. The film stars Vinay Forrt, Shabareesh Varma and Balu Varghese and newcomer Gayathri Ashok. Dileesh Pothan has supporting roles. The music is composed by Rajesh Murugesan, while Gautham Sankar is the cinematographer. Lalkrishnan S. Achuthan is the editor. The film had a theatrical release on 17 November 2018.

== Synopsis ==
Vinu and Angeline, a couple in love, decide to elope and get married. But their friends get involved and their plan spins out of control.

== Cast ==
- Vinay Forrt as Vinu
- Sabareesh Varma as SK
- Balu Varghese as Rahul
- Manoj Guinness as Lovlesh
- Vijo Vijayakumar as Jinto
- Saju Navodaya as Itoope
- Dileesh Pothan as Suresh
- Bobby Simha as Joseph Dayanidhi (cameo)
- Indrans as Judge
- Vini Vishwa Lal as Alex
- Gayathri Ashok as Angeline
- Anna A Smith (Angeline's childhood)
- Nisha Sarang as Angeline's Mother
- Seema G. Nair as S.K.'s Mother
- Surjith Gopinath
- Sayana Sunil as Apsara S
- Mukundan as Gangadharan
- Jisjoy as Narrator (Voice Over)

== Production ==
Director Arungeorge K David first announced from his Facebook profile that Ladoo will be produced by Mini Studio, and presented by Dhanush. Shabareesh Varma, Balu Varghese, and Saju Navodaya were first confirmed to play roles in the film. Rajesh Murugesan, the music director of Premam was confirmed to compose the music for the film. Gautham Sankar was also confirmed as cinematographer.

=== Filming ===
Principal photography commenced on 10 May 2017 in Thrissur, Kerala. The main filming location was at Thrissur.

== Reception ==
A review in the Times of India stated the film had adopted the spirit of comedies from the 1990s. The film received a mixed review in LensMens but The New Indian Express found it clichéd and exaggerated.
