= 5th South Indian International Movie Awards =

Indian annual film awards event

- Date: 30 June – 1 July 2016
- Site: Suntec Convention Centre, Singapore

Television coverage
- Network: Sun TV Network

The 5th South Indian International Movie Awards is an awards event held at Suntec Convention Centre, Singapore on 30 June and 1 July 2016. SIIMA 2016 will recognize the best films and performances from the past year, along with special honors for lifetime contributions and a few special awards.

== Honorary awards ==
=== Lifetime Achievement Award ===
- S. Janaki (singer)
- Panchu Arunachalam (writer & producer)

=== Special appreciation ===
- TBA

== Main awards Nominees ==
=== Film ===
Best Film
Tamil	Telugu
Thani Oruvan – AGS Entertainment; I – Aascar Films; Kaaka Muttai – Wunderbar Films / Grass Root Film Company; Naanum Rowdy Dhaan – Wunderbar Films; OK Kanmani – Madras Talkies	Baahubali: The Beginning – Shobu Yarlagadda & Prasad Devineni; Bhale Bhale Magadivoy – Bunny Vassu / UV Creations; Kanche – Y. Rajeev Reddy / J. Sai Babu; Srimanthudu – Mythri Movie Makers; Rudramadevi – Gunasekhar
Kannada	Malayalam
Mythri – Omkar Films; Kendasampige – Parimala Film Factory; Krishna Leela – Sri Krishna Art Creations; RangiTaranga – Shree Devi Entertainers; Uppi 2 – Upendra Productions	Premam – Anwar Rasheed Entertainments; Chandrettan Evideya – Sameer Thahir / Shyju Khalid / Ashiq Usman; Charlie – Shebin Backer / Joju George / Martin Prakkat; Ennu Ninte Moideen – Suresh Raj / Binoy Shankarath / Ragy Thomas; Pathemari – Salim Ahamed / Adv Hashik T K / T P Sudheesh
Best Director
Tamil	Telugu
Vignesh Shivan – Naanum Rowdy Dhaan; Mohan Raja – Thani Oruvan; Gautham Vasudev Menon – Yennai Arindhaal; K. V. Anand – Anegan; Mani Ratnam – OK Kanmani	S. S. Rajamouli – Baahubali: The Beginning; Gunasekhar – Rudramadevi; Koratala Siva – Srimanthudu; Krish – Kanche; Maruthi – Bhale Bhale Magadivoy
Kannada	Malayalam
Upendra – Uppi 2; Chandrashekar Bandiyappa – Rathavara; Duniya Soori– Kendasampige; Pawan Wadeyar – Rana Vikrama; Shashank – Krishna Leela	Alphonse Putharen – Premam; Lal Jose – Nee-Na; Martin Prakkat – Charlie; R. S. Vimal – Ennu Ninte Moideen; Salim Ahamed – Pathemari

=== Acting ===
Best Actor
Tamil	Telugu
Vikram – I; Dhanush – Anegan; Jayam Ravi – Thani Oruvan; Lawrence Raghavendra – Kanchana 2; Vijay Sethupathi – Orange Mittai	Mahesh Babu – Srimanthudu; Allu Arjun – Rudramadevi; Naani – Bhale Bhale Magadivoy; Prabhas – Baahubali: The Beginning; Varun Tej – Kanche
Kannada	Malayalam
Puneeth Rajkumar – Rana Vikrama; Ajay Rao – Krishna Leela; Sathish Ninasam – Rocket; Upendra – Uppi 2; Yash – Masterpiece	Prithviraj – Ennu Ninte Moideen; Dulquer Salmaan – Charlie; Jayasurya – Su Su Sudhi Vathmeekam; Mammootty – Pathemari; Nivin Pauly – Premam
Best Actress
Tamil	Telugy
Nayanthara – Naanum Rowdy Dhaan; Nithya Menen – OK Kanmani; Aishwarya Rajesh – Kaaka Muttai; Amy Jackson – I; Jyothika – 36 Vayadhinile	Shruti Haasan – Srimanthudu; Nithya Menen – Malli Malli Idi Rani Roju; Anushka Shetty – Rudramadevi; Lakshmi Manchu – Dongata; Samantha Ruth Prabhu – S/O Satyamurthy
Kannada	Malayalam
Rachita Ram – Ranna; Mayuri Kyatari – Krishna Leela; Parul Yadav – Vaastu Prakaara; Radhika Pandit – Endendigu; Shanvi Srivastav – Masterpiece	Nayanthara – Bhaskar The Rascal; Parvathy – Ennu Ninte Moideen; Amala Paul – Mili; Anusree – Chandrettan Evideya; Mamta Mohandas – Two Countries
Best Actor in a Supporting Role
Tamil	Telugu
Prakash Raj – OK Kanmani; Charle – Kirumi; Karunakaran – Indru Netru Naalai; Nassar – Uttama Villain; Rajkiran – Komban	Rajendra Prasad – Srimanthudu; Jagapati Babu – Srimanthudu; Posani Krishna Murali – Temper; Sathyaraj – Baahubali: The Beginning; Upendra – S/O Satyamurthy
Kannada	Malayalam
Pannagha Bharan – Mrugashira; Arvind Rao – RangiTaranga; Chetan Chandra – Plus; P. Ravi Shankar – Aatagara; Rajesh Nataranga – Kendasampige	Siddique – Pathemari; Tovino Thomas – Ennu Ninte Moideen; Biju Menon – Anarkali; Chemban Vinod Jose – Urumbukal Urangarilla; Vineeth Sreenivasan – Oru Vadakkan Selfie
Best Actress in a Supporting Role
Tamil	Telugu
Radhika – Thangamagan; Nithya Menen – Kanchana 2; Asha Sarath – Papanasam; Lakshmi Menon – Vedalam; Leela Samson – OK Kanmani	Ramya Krishna – Baahubali: The Beginning; Nithya Menen – Rudramadevi; Kriti Kharbanda – Bruce Lee - The Fighter; Pavitra Lokesh – Malli Malli Idi Rani Roju; Sneha – S/O Satyamurthy
Kannada	Malayalam
Tejaswini Prakash – Goolihatti; Aishwarya Nag – Muddu Manase; Deepika Kamaiah – Neene Bari Neene; Karunya Ram – Vajrakaya; Sheetal Shetty – Kendasampige	Lena – Ennu Ninte Moideen; Namitha Pramod – Chandrettan Evideya; Kalpana – Charlie; Miya – Anarkali; Rima Kallingal – Rani Padmini
Best Actor in a Negative Role
Tamil	Telugu
Arun Vijay – Yennai Arindhaal; Arvind Swamy – Thani Oruvan; Karthik – Anegan; Suresh Gopi – I; Vijay Yesudas – Maari	Rana Daggubati – Baahubali: The Beginning; Mithun Chakraborthy – Gopala Gopala; Prakash Raj – Temper; Ravi Kishan – Kick 2; Sampath Raj – Srimanthudu
Kannada	Malayalam
Saikumar – RangiTaranga; P. Ravi Shankar– Masterpiece; Prakash Belawadi – Kendasampige; Prakash Raj – Mr. Airavata; Vikram Singh– Rana Vikrama	Kabir Bedi – Anarkali; Atul Kulkarni – Kanal; Nedumudi Venu – Oru Second Class Yathra; Saikumar – Ennu Ninte Moideen; Shafeeq Rahman – Amar Akbar Anthony
Best Comedian
Tamil	Telugu
RJ Balaji – Naanum Rowdy Dhaan; Kovai Sarala – Kanchana 2; Sathish – Thangamagan; Santhanam– Vasuvum Saravananum Onna Padichavanga; Yogi Babu – Kaaka Muttai	Vennela Kishore – Bhale Bhale Magadivoy; Ali – S/O Satyamurthy; Brahmanandam – Bruce Lee - The Fighter; Prudhvi – Bengal Tiger; Srinivasa Reddy – Pataas
Kannada	Malayalam
Chikkanna – Masterpiece; Achyuth Kumar – Krishna Leela; Rangayana Raghu – Rana Vikrama; Sadhu Kokila – Ramleela; Tabla Nani– Endendigu	Aju Varghese – Two Countries; Dhyan Sreenivasan – Kunjiramayanam; Neeraj Madhav – Adi Kapyare Kootamani; Soubin Shahir– Premam; Vinay Forrt– Premam

=== Debut awards ===
Best Debut Actor
Tamil	Telugu
G. V. Prakash Kumar – Darling; Darbuka Siva – Rajathanthiram; Sai Rajkumar – Kuttram Kadithal; Shanmugapandiyan – Sagaptham; Varun – Oru Naal Iravil	Akhil Akkineni – Akhil; Aakash Puri – Andhra Pori; Parvatheesam – Kerintha; Sathya Karthik – Tippu; Vijay Devarakonda – Yevade Subramanyam
Kannada	Malayalam
Vinay Rajkumar – Siddhartha; Mahesh – Namak Haraam; Nirup Bhandari – Rangi Taranga; Prathap Narayan – Benkipatna; Santhosh Reva – Kendasampige	Siddharth Menon – Rockstar; Adil Ibrahim – Nirnayakam; Shabareesh Varma – Premam; Sharafudheen – Premam; Vineeth Mohan – Adi Kapyare Kootamani
Best Debut Actress
Tamil	Telugu
Keerthy Suresh – Idhu Enna Maayam; Amyra Dastur – Anegan; Deepa Sannidhi – Enakkul Oruvan; Radhika Prasidhha – Kuttram Kadithal; Sushma Raj – India Pakistan	Pragya Jaiswal – Kanche; Malavika Nair – Yevade Subramanyam; Shruti Sodhi – Pataas; Tridha Choudhury – Surya vs Surya; Sayesha Saigal – Akhil
Kannada	Malayalam
Manvitha Harish – Kendasampige; Apoorva Gowda – 1st Rank Raju; Nabha Natesh – Vajrakaya; Urvashi Rautela – Mr. Airavata; Radhika Chetan – Rangi Taranga	Sai Pallavi – Premam; Anupama Parameswaran – Premam; Deepti Sathi – Nee-Na; Madonna Sebastian – Premam; Manjima Mohan – Oru Vadakkan Selfie
Best Debut Director
Tamil	Telugu
Anucharan – Kirumi; Ashwin Saravanan – Maya; Bramma G. – Kuttram Kadithal; M. Manikantan – Kaaka Muttai; Ravikumar R– Indru Netru Naalai	Anil Ravipudi – Pataas; Karthik Ghattamaneni – Surya vs Surya; KK Radha Krishna Kumar – Jil; Nag Ashwin – Yevade Subramanyam; Sriram Aditya– Bhale Manchi Roju
Kannada	Malayalam
Anup Bhandari – RangiTaranga; Imran Sardhariya – Endendigu; Manju Mandavya – Masterpiece; Priya Belliappa – Ring Road Suma; Rajkumar Reddy – Ouija	

=== Music ===
Best Music Director
Tamil	Telugu
Anirudh Ravichander – Naanum Rowdy Dhaan; A. R. Rahman – OK Kanmani; Ghibran – Uttama Villain; Harris Jayaraj – Yennai Arindhaal; Hip Hop Adhi – Thani Oruvan	Devi Sri Prasad – Srimanthudu; Devi Sri Prasad – S/O Satyamurthy; Gopi Sunder – Bhale Bhale Magadivoy; M. M. Keeravani – Baahubali: The Beginning; S. Thaman – Bruce Lee - The Fighter
Kannada	Malayalam
Arjun Janya– Vajrakaya; Anup Bhandari – RangiTaranga; Gurukiran – Uppi 2; Sridhar V. Sambhram – Krishna Leela; V. Harikrishna – Masterpiece	Rajesh Murugesan – Premam; Bijibal – Rani Padmini; M. Jayachandran – Ennu Ninte Moideen; Rahul Raj – Kohinoor; Shaan Rahman – Aadu Oru Bheekara Jeeviyanu
Best Lyricist
Tamil	Telugu
Vairamuthu – "Malargal Kettaen" from OK Kanmani; Dhanush – "Enna Solla" from Thangamagan; Kabilan – "Ennodu Nee Irundhaal" from I; Thamarai – "Unakenna Venum Sollu" from Yennai Arindhaal; Vignesh Shivn – "Yennai Maatrum Kadhale" from Naanum Rowdy Dhaan	Sirivennela – "Itu Itu Itu" from Kanche; Devi Sri Prasad – "Super Machi" from S/O Satyamurthy; Ramajogayya Sastry – "O Manishi" from Yevade Subramanyam; Ramajogayya Sastry – "Rama Rama" from Srimanthudu; Shivashakti Datta – "Mamatala Thalli" from Baahubali: The Beginning
Kannada	Malayalam
Anup Bhandari– "Ee Sanje" from RangiTaranga; A. P. Arjun – "Raja Rani" from Rhaatee; Jayanth Kaikini – "Kanasali Nadesu" from Kendasampige; K. Kalyan – "Ninnalle" from Endendigu; Manju Mandavya – "Annange Love" from Masterpiece	Shabareesh Varma – "Malare" from Premam; Hari Narayanan – "Ambazham" from Oru Second Class Yathra; Manoj Kuroor & Rajeev Nair – "Kanakamylanchi" from Loham; Rafeeq Ahammed – "Kaathirunnu" from Ennu Ninte Moideen; Santhosh Varma – "Ente Janalarikil" from Su Su Sudhi Vathmeekam
Best Male Playback Singer
Tamil	Telugu
Anirudh Ravichander – "Thangamey" from Naanum Rowdy Dhaan; Benny Dayal – "Unakenna Venum Sollu" from Yennai Arindhaal; G. V. Prakash Kumar – "Anbe Anbe" from Darling; Karthik – "Aye Sinamika" from OK Kanmani; Sid Sriram – "Ennodu Nee Irundhaal" from I	Sagar – "Jatha Kalise" from Srimanthudu; Dhananjay & Haricharan – "Bhaje Bhaaje" from Gopala Gopala; M. M. Keeravani – "Nippule Shwasaga" from Baahubali: The Beginning; Raghu Dixit – "Jaago Jaago Re" from Srimanthudu; Sonu Nigam – "Needhe Needhe" from Gopala Gopala
Kannada	Malayalam
Santhosh Venky – "Raja Rani" from Rhaatee; Armaan Malik – "Free Idhe" from Siddhartha; Gurukiran – "Baekoo Baekoo" from Uppi 2; Karthik – "Nenape Nithya Mallige" from Kendasampige; Vijay Prakash– "Airdelu Airchilu" from Rana Vikrama	Vijay Yesudas – "Malare" from Premam; Dulquer Salman – "Chundaripenne" from Charlie; Karthik – "Thanne Thanne" from Two Countries; Najim Arshad – "Manju Peyume" from Mili; Vineeth Sreenivasan – "Aluva Puzha" from Premam
Best Female Playback Singer
Tamil	Telugu
Shweta Mohan – "Enna Solla" from Thangamagan; Shreya Ghoshal – "Pookkalae Sattru Oyivedungal" from I; Chinmayi – "Idhaythai Yedho Ondru" from Yennai Arindhaal; Khareshma Ravichandran – "Kadhal Cricket" from Thani Oruvan; Neeti Mohan – "Neeyum Naanum" from Naanum Rowdy Dhaan; Shashaa Tirupati – "Parandhu Sella Vaa" from OK Kanmani	Satya Yamini – "Mamathala Thalli" from Baahubali: The Beginning; Shreya Ghoshal – "Nijamenani Nammani" from Kanche; Chinmayi – "Vennellona Mounam" from Surya vs Surya; Priya Himesh – "Gathama Gathama" from Malli Malli Idi Rani Roju; Ramya Behara– "Dheevara" from Baahubali: The Beginning
Kannada	Malayalam
Inchara Rao – "Kareyole" from RangiTaranga; Anuradha Bhat – "Mareyada Pusthaka" from Rathavara; Apoorva Sridhar – "Krishna Calling" from Krishna Leela; Shweta Mohan – "Kanasali Nadesu" from Kendasampige; Indu Nagaraj – "Ka Thalkattu" from Mr. Airavata	Baby Sreya – "Enno Njanente" from Amar Akbar Anthony; Shreya Ghoshal – "Kaathirunnu" from Ennu Ninte Moideen; Shakthisree Gopalan– "Pularikalo" from Charlie; Shweta Mohan – "Ee Thanutha" from Anarkali; Vaikom Vijayalakshmi – "Kaikkottum" from Oru Vadakkan Selfie

== Critics' choice ==
Tamil Cinema

- Best Actor – Jayam Ravi – Thani Oruvan
- Best Actress – Nithya Menen – O Kadhal Kanmani

Telugu Cinema

- Best Actor – Allu Arjun – Rudhramadevi
- Best Actress – Anushka Shetty – Rudhramadevi

Kannada Cinema

- Best Actor – Sathish Ninasam – Rocket
- Best Actress – Shanvi Srivastava – Masterpiece

Malayalam Cinema

- Best Actor – Nivin Pauly – Premam
- Best Actress – Parvathy – Ennu Ninte Moideen

== Generation Next Awards ==
  - The South Sensation of the Year: Sudheer Babu
  - The Youth Icon of South India award: Samantha Ruth Prabhu
