= United Kingdom of Kerala =

2025 Indian drama film

- Theatrical release poster
- Directed by: Arun Vaiga
- Written by: Arun Vaiga
- Produced by: Anne; Sajeev Alexander Mathew
- Starring: Ranjith Sajeev; Johny Antony; Indrans; Manoj K. Jayan; Manju Pillai; Sangita Madhavan Nair; Meera Vasudevan; Manoj K. U.; Alphonse Puthren
- Cinematography: Sinoj P. Ayyappan
- Edited by: Arun Vaiga
- Music by: Rajesh Murugesan
- Release date: 20 June 2025
- Country: India
- Language: Malayalam

United Kingdom of Kerala is a 2025 Indian Malayalam-language drama film written and directed by Arun Vaiga. The film stars Ranjith Sajeev, Johny Antony, Indrans, Manoj K. Jayan, Manju Pillai, Sangita Madhavan Nair, Meera Vasudevan, Manoj K. U., and Alphonse Puthren.

== Cast ==
- Ranjith Sajeev
- Johny Antony
- Indrans
- Manoj K. Jayan
- Manju Pillai
- Sangita Madhavan Nair
- Meera Vasudevan
- Manoj K. U.
- Alphonse Puthren

== Music ==
The music was composed by Rajesh Murugesan.

Track listing
No.	Title	Lyrics	Singer(s)	Length
1.	"Resamale"	Shabareesh Varma	Kapil Kapilan, Fazzy, Rajesh Murugesan	3:29
2.	"Nee Ennil"	Shabareesh Varma, Arun Vaiga	K. S. Harisankar	3:55
3.	"Changa Changa"	Shabareesh Varma	Vineeth Sreenivasan, Madhu Balakrishnan	4:21
4.	"Thenni Veenithe"	Shabareesh Varma	Jassie Gift	3:45
5.	"Chirakugal"	Shabareesh Varma	Suroor Musthafa, Gayathry Rajiv	5:02
6.	"Irulithu Maari Varum"	Rajesh Murugesan	Suroor Musthafa	3:55
7.	"Kanal Eriyum"	Murukan Kattakkada	Murukan Kattakkada	5:09
Total length:				29:36

== Release ==
United Kingdom of Kerala was initially scheduled for release on 23 May 2025 but was postponed and later released theatrically on 20 June 2025.

== Reception ==
Anna Mathews of The Times of India rated the film 2.5/5 stars and wrote, "With a simplistic narrative and a lead character, who is too ironic an ‘angry young man’ to gain our sympathy, the film falters". Vivek Santhosh of The New Indian Express gave it 1.5/5 stars and wrote, "Despite its worthy themes of self-determination and migration, UKOK is held back by tired writing and an inconsistent narrative focus". Princy Alexander of Onmanorama wrote, "The music and songs by Rajesh Murugesan worked well for the movie, which serves a hard-hitting message with some heart."
