= Oh Meri Laila =

- Theatrical release poster
- Directed by: Abhishek KS
- Written by: Anuraj O. B.
- Story by: Anuraj O. B. Abhishek KS
- Produced by: Dr. Paul Varghese
- Starring: Antony Varghese; Sona Olickal; Nandhana Rajan
- Cinematography: Bablu Aju
- Edited by: Kiran Das
- Music by: Songs: Ankit Menon; Background Score: Sidhartha Pradeep
- Production company: Dr. Paul's Entertainment
- Release date: 23 December 2022
- Running time: 147 minutes
- Country: India
- Language: Malayalam

Oh Meri Laila is a 2022 Indian Malayalam-language film directed by Abhishek KS (in his directorial debut). starring Antony Varghese, Sona Olickal, Balachandran Chullikkad and Nandhu. The feature film is produced by Dr. Paul Varghese and the music composed by Ankit Menon. It was theatrically released on 23 December 2022.

== Cast ==
- Antony Varghese as Lailasuran a.k.a. Lailu
- Sona Olickal as Clara Thomas and Mary Thomas
- Balachandran Chullikkad as Bhadran
- Nandu as Thomas Kurian
- Sivakami
- Nandana Rajan as Saroja Devi
- Senthil Krishna
- Shabareesh as Yohannan

== Production ==
=== Filming ===
Principal photography began on 14 February 2022. The shoot wrapped up in April 2022

== Reception ==
=== Critical response ===
A reviewer of Zee News wrote "The first half of the film is full of little glances, love scenes and comedy. Pepe's easygoing style and acting is the highlight of the first half. The movie is set in a college setting". Sanjith Sidhardhan from OTT play wrote "Verdict: If you are in the mood for a light-hearted romcom, Oh Meri Laila makes for a decent one-time watch, thanks to its lead cast". P. Ayyappadas from Malayala Manorama says "The director has been able to accurately portray different environments like campus, love and family. Anuraj OB has also been able to shine in script and acting. Sona Olikal's remarkable performance as the heroine deserves applause. Babloo Aju's cinematography and Ankit Menon's music are also appreciated". Shrishma Eriat from Mathrubhumi says "Another Antony Varghese will be seen on screen, giving a very simple performance from the beginning to the end of O Meri Laila. A standout performance in this film suggests that films are yet to discover the talented actor Antony Varghese is capable of, rather than just portraying a hard-hitting, stubborn character".
