= Thobama =

2018 film

- Theatrical release poster
- Directed by: Mohsin Kassim
- Written by: T. V. Aswathy; Mohsin Kassim
- Produced by: Alphonse Puthren; Sukumar Thekkepat
- Starring: Sharaf U Dheen; Krishna Shankar; Siju Wilson; Punya Elizabeth Bose; Rajesh Sharma
- Cinematography: Sunoj Velayudhan
- Edited by: Shinos Rahman
- Music by: Rajesh Murugesan
- Production companies: Radical Cinemas; Thekkepat Films
- Distributed by: Global United Media
- Release date: 27 April 2018
- Country: India
- Language: Malayalam

Thobama is a 2018 Indian Malayalam-language comedy-drama film directed and co-written by Mohsin Kassim, produced by Alphonse Puthren and Sukumaran Thekkeppat. It stars Sharaf U Dheen, Krishna Shankar, Siju Wilson and Punya Elizabeth Bose in lead roles. Punya Elizabeth Bose made her debut in Thobama. Rajesh Murugesan composed the music. The film was released on 27 April 2018.

== Plot ==
Thommi (Thomas), Balu and Mammu (Manaf) are thick friends, having strong desire to earn big money with easy way of doing. Once they got influenced by multilevel marketing but find it hard to get money for its joining. So, they tied hands with Thommi's uncle Xavier (called as Aashan), and the trio under the guidance of Mani and Vijay, who were the staff of his uncle, started the supervision work of illegal sand extraction from river at night and started earning money. Vijay was once caught by the police and Balu was called to reach the police station and got warned.

Marcose is an illegal lottery black money exchange agent, who marks the winning lottery tickets before declaration of results using his influence. Mani who works with Marcose finds from him that next bumper prize will be for the ticket kept with Aashan. But Aashan sold the series of five tickets to five people before the information passed to him by Mani. To regain the tickets, Aashan hires the trio and offers a prize of three lakhs.

Meanwhile, Balu got new neighbour, who is the circle inspector of police and his family. His daughter Neethu is a colleague of Balu, and they slowly build up their affection.

Mammu having a strong intention to become an actor, got an opportunity to become a hero but demands two lakhs by the film unit. So, with hesitation from Balu, the duo joins with Aashan and identifies two of the sold tickets, but unable to recollect the face of the third person and none of other two. Balu and Mammu regain two of the sold tickets, one from an LIC agent and the other from a prostitute by tricking them. One night, Aashan recollects that fourth ticket had sold to a hotel labor. Vijay has returned from custody, but Mani and Marcose are not willing to take him back to their team. Thommi and Mani beats the hotel labor in search of the ticket but finds nothing. Next day they searched his room and got the ticket returned but were attacked by the locals while they escaped.

Mammu finds one day that his mentor Ustad, who he sought guidance from on several instances, had got arrested as he was a culprit in different cases. Lacking confidence as an after effect of this incidence, Mammu withdraws from the mission.

Thommi continues in search of fifth ticket as per the information received and finds the ticket holder at a hospital following an accident. He searches his belongings but finds no ticket. He identifies his house that night and searched for ticket but got scared and became unconscious. Mammu and Balu rescue him and admit him in a hospital. From Vijay, Mammu and Balu identify that Thommi got attacked by Mani and Aashan, but Vijay attacked them and exposes them to Marcose as they betrayed Vijay.

Finally, the bumper prize was announced, and the winning ticket was with the father of the auto driver who was in an accident, where Tommi had replaced this ticket on the last night of search. In the end, the trio had rejoined to search for a new life of success.

== Cast ==
- Sharaf U Dheen as Thommi
- Siju Wilson as Balu
- Krishna Shankar as Mammu
- Shabareesh Varma as Vijay
- Punya Elizabeth Bose as Neethu
- Hareesh Perumanna as Kappalandi Karunan
- Jaffar Idukki as Pavithran
- Rajesh Sharma as Mathaichan
- Raffi as Gopinathan
- Vettukili Prakash as Vareeth
- James Elia as Benchamin Idikula
- Nisthar Ahammed as Marcose
- Sreelakshmi as Smitha
- Maya Vishwanath as Deepa
- Neena Kurup as Sindhu
- Vanitha Krishna Chandran as Shanthi
- Jabir Aman as Asharaf

== Production ==
The film was jointly produced by Alphonse Puthren and Sukumaran Thekkeppat, directed and co-written by debutant Mohsin Kassim.
