= Sharaf U Dheen =

Indian actor

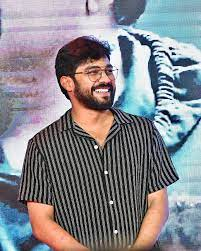
- Born: Perumbavoor, Kerala, India
- Occupations: Actor, Film Producer
- Years active: 2013–present
- Spouse: Beema (m. 2015)
- Children: 2

Sharafudheen, professionally credited as Sharaf U Dheen, is an Indian actor and film producer who appears in Malayalam films. He made his acting debut in 2013 with Neram. He got his breakthrough in Premam (2015).

== Personal life ==
Sharafudheen hails from Perumbavoor in the district of Ernakulam, Kerala. After completing his studies, he worked in various industries. He later established a tourism company named 'Seasonz India' at his hometown before foraying into cinema.

== Career ==
He made his acting debut in Neram in 2013, directed by Alphonse Puthren. He also acted in Ohm Shanthi Oshaana (2014) directed by Jude Anthany Joseph. He received breakthrough with the Alphonse Puthren-directed romantic-comedy Premam in 2015. In the film he played the role of Girirajan Kozhi, a flirt. He acted along with Prithviraj Sukumaran in the film Pavada in 2016. He has also worked in Pretham, Carbon (2018) and Thobama (2018) which was produced by Alphonse Puthren. In 2019, he acted in his debut leading role in Neeyum Njanum.

== Filmography ==
Key
†	Denotes films that have not yet been released

- All films are in Malayalam language unless otherwise noted.

Year	Title	Role	Notes
2013	Neram	Tutor	Malayalam-Tamil bilingual film
2014	Ohm Shanthi Oshaana	Sunny	
2014	Homely Meals	Dubbing Studio Worker	
2015	Premam	Girirajan Kozhi	
2016	Paavada	Vilakkoothi Rajan	
2016	Happy Wedding	Manu Krishnan	
2016	Pretham	Priyalal	
2016	Welcome to Central Jail	Prisoner	
2017	Munthirivallikal Thalirkkumbol	Reji	
2017	Georgettan's Pooram	Pallan	
2017	Role Models	Rexy Joseph	
2017	Njandukalude Nattil Oridavela	Yesudas	
2018	Carbon	Santosh	
2018	Aadhi	Sarath Nair	
2018	Thobama	Thommi	
2018	Varathan	Josy K Baby	
2018	Johny Johny Yes Appa	Philip aka Peeli	
2018	Pretham 2	Priyalal	
2019	Neeyum Njanum	Yakub Mohammed	
2019	Children's Park	Lenin	
2019	Virus	Sandeep	
2019	Happy Sardar	Kaakku	
2020	Anjaam Pathiraa	Dr Benjamin Louis	
2020	Halal Love Story	Thoufeeq	
2021	Aarkkariyam	Roy	
2022	Naaradan	Pradeep John	
2022	Pathrosinte Padappukal	Sony Pathrose	
2022	Kuttavum Shikshayum	C.P.O. Abin Raj	
2022	Priyan Ottathilanu	Priyadarshan aka Priyan	
2022	Rorschach	Satheeshan Madathil	
2022	Adrishyam	Rajkumar	
2022	Gold	Driver Richards	
2022	1744 White Alto	Inspector Mahesh	
2022	Aanandam Paramanandam	Gireesh	
2023	Djinn	Sukesh/Django	
2023	Ntikkakkakkoru Premondarnn	Jimmy	
2023	Janaki Jaane	Manu	
2023	Madhura Manohara Moham	Manu Mohan	
2023	Master Peace	Binoy	Disney+ Hotstar Web series
2023	Tholvi F.C.	Oommen	
2024	Level Cross	Zincho	
2024	Bougainvillea	Biju	
2024	Hello Mummy	Bony	
2024	Sorgavaasal	Sunil Kumar	Tamil film
2025	Padakkalam	Renjith	
2025	Samshayam	Harris	
2025	The Pet Detective	Tony Jose Alula	Also producer
2025	Khajuraho Dreams	Job	
2026	Ashakal Aayiram	Sumith Raghavan	
2026	Prathichaya	Ravi Madhavan	
2026	Madhuvidhu	Aanjilimoottil Amruth Raj "Ammu" / Aanjilimoottil Narayanan Kartha	
2026	Mollywood Times	Sachin Vaikom David	
2026	It's a Medical Miracle	Sooraj	
2026	Bachelor Party D'eux	Pappan	
