= Premam =

2015 film by Alphonse Puthren

- Theatrical release poster
- Directed by: Alphonse Puthren
- Written by: Alphonse Puthren
- Produced by: Anwar Rasheed
- Starring: Nivin Pauly; Sai Pallavi; Madonna Sebastian; Anupama Parameswaran
- Cinematography: Anend C. Chandran
- Edited by: Alphonse Puthren
- Music by: Rajesh Murugesan
- Production company: Anwar Rasheed Entertainments
- Distributed by: A&A Release; Tricolor Entertainment; (Kerala and Tamil Nadu)
- Release date: 29 May 2015
- Running time: 156 minutes
- Country: India
- Language: Malayalam
- Budget: ₹4 crore
- Box office: ₹73 crore

Premam (transl. Love) is a 2015 Indian Malayalam-language coming-of-age romantic comedy-drama film written, directed and edited by Alphonse Puthren. It was produced by Anwar Rasheed and stars Nivin Pauly and Sai Pallavi (in her major film debut). It also features an ensemble supporting cast including Madonna Sebastian & Anupama Parameswaran (in their debut) with Shabareesh Varma, Krishna Sankar, Siju Wilson, Ananth Nag, Vinay Forrt, Soubin Shahir, Sharafudheen and others. The plot follows George (Nivin)’s romantic journey with his friends from their teens to adulthood. While George's first love turns out to be a disappointment, Malar (Pallavi), a college lecturer, rekindles his love interest. His romantic journey takes him through several stages, helping him find his purpose.

The principal photography began in July 2014. The film was shot across locations including Goa, Aluva and Fort Kochi. The filming was wrapped up in November 2014. Anend C. Chandran and Rajesh Murugan handled the cinematography and music. The film was produced on a budget of ₹4 crore.

Premam was released on 29 May 2015 to widespread critical acclaim with praise towards the cast performance (especially Nivin and Pallavi), story, screenplay, cinematography, music, background score, editing and direction by Alphonse Puthren. The film emerged as a major commercial success grossing ₹73 crore. The film had a theatrical run of 175 days in Kerala and over 300 days in Tamil Nadu. The film was included in The Hindu's top 25 Malayalam movies of the decade. Pallavi and Nivin's performances were included by the Film Companion in its list of “100 Greatest Performances of the Decade”. It was also remade in telugu by Naga Chaitanya and Shruti Hasan portraying the respective roles played by Nivin Pauly and Sai Pallavi in 2016.

The film received nominations and won awards in several categories. At the 63rd Filmfare Awards South, Premam was nominated in seven categories, winning Best Female Debut (Sai Pallavi) and Best Male Playback Singer (Vijay Yesudas for "Malare"). At the 5th South Indian International Movie Awards, it received fifteen nominations and won seven, including Best Film, Best Director, Best Music Director, Best Lyricist, and Best Male Playback Singer (Vijay Yesudas). Nivin and Sai Pallavi won the Best Actor Critics and Best Debut Actress awards. At the 1st IIFA Utsavam, it received nine nominations and won four, including Best Performance in a Comic Role, Best Music Direction, Best Lyricist and Best Male Playback Singer. Among other wins, the film received six Asianet Film Awards, six Vanitha Film Awards, three Asianet Comedy Awards, four Asiavision Awards and two CPC Cine Awards. The film was not considered by the Kerala State Film Awards, the official state film award given by the Government of Kerala.

== Plot ==
George David is a sixteen-year-old pre-degree student studying at Holy Spirit Convent College in Aluva, Kerala. He is deeply infatuated with Mary, a popular girl from the same town. Alongside his close friends Shambu and Koya, George frequently follows Mary in hopes of speaking to her, though he is constantly intimidated by her protective father.

Despite multiple attempts, George is repeatedly hindered by unfortunate timing and circumstances. His romantic aspirations are crushed when he discovers that Mary is already in a relationship with another boy, who also happens to be named George. Heartbroken, he reluctantly agrees to help Mary meet her boyfriend discreetly. Following their poor academic performance in their final examinations, George and his friends decide to focus on their future education.

In 2005, George, Shambu, and Koya enroll at Union Christian College in Aluva. During the initial ragging period, George encounters Malar, a newly appointed lecturer from Tamil Nadu. George falls in love with her, and over time, she appears to reciprocate his affection. He is deeply impressed by her talent when she assists his college dance team. Convinced of her genuine feelings, George begins to contemplate marriage. Concurrently, a fellow faculty member, Vimal Sir, attempts to woo Malar with the help of the school’s physical education instructor, Shivan, though his efforts prove unsuccessful.

Later that academic year, Malar travels to Kodaikanal with her cousin, Arivazhagan, who is traditionally arranged to be her prospective groom. A few days later, the college receives word that Malar was involved in a severe accident and has officially resigned from her position. George and his friends immediately travel to Kodaikanal to visit her, only to discover that the trauma has caused selective amnesia, leaving her unable to recognize George or recall their relationship. Realizing she has no memory of him, a devastated George steps back, and Malar subsequently marries Arivazhagan. George and his friends quietly attend her wedding reception to offer their silent goodbyes.

In 2014, the thirty-year-old George operates a successful café alongside his childhood friend, Jojo. He crosses paths with Celine, a twenty-two-year-old woman, and develops romantic feelings for her. He soon discovers that Celine is the same young girl who used to accompany Mary years prior, and the two quickly bond over their shared past. Despite their significant age difference, George decides to propose to Celine. However, her family has already engaged her to Roney Varghese, a volatile cocaine addict who mistreats her. When Roney's abusive behavior causes the engagement to be canceled, he continues to relentlessly harass Celine. One night, George, Shambu, Koya, and Jojo confront Roney and give him a sound thrashing.

Ultimately, George and Celine marry. At their wedding reception, Malar arrives as a guest alongside her husband, having been personally invited by Celine. As they prepare to depart the venue, a conversation between Malar and her husband reveals that she has secretly regained her memory of the past. However, recognizing George's current contentment, she intentionally chooses not to disclose this truth, preserving his marital happiness. George and Malar exchange a final, understanding glance, officially achieving closure.

== Cast ==
- Nivin Pauly as George David
- Sai Pallavi as Malar
- Madonna Sebastian as Celine George
  - Eva Prakash as young Celine
- Anupama Parameswaran as Mary George
- Krishna Shankar as Koya
- Shabareesh Varma as Shambu
- Siju Wilson as Jojo
- Ananth Nag as Arivazhagan, Malar's cousin who later became her husband
- Vinay Forrt as Vimal "Java" Sir
- Soubin Shahir as P.T Shivan Sir
- Anju Kurian as Anju, George's sister
- Sooraj K. Sathyan as Suresh
- Shiyas K. A. as Shiyas
- Maju Mathew as Maju
- Sibu Thankachan as Sibu
- Althaf Salim as Jahangir
- Unni Chetan as Unni Chetan
- Vinod Ettan as Vinod
- Vijai Suresh as Kola Kozhi
- Jayesh as Kuttapi
- George Kora as George, Mary's boyfriend
- Franco Davis as George, Mary's father
- Renji Panicker as David Kalapparambath, George's father
- Maniyanpilla Raju as College Principal
- Nandini Nair as Nandini, Malar's friend
- Faisal C.M. as Faisal
- Justin John as Justin
- Dinesh Prabhakar as Lonappan Chettan
- Sharaf U Dheen as Henry aka Girirajan Kozhi
- Alwin Antony as Moosa
- Mahadev R K as College Student
- George P. Roy as Aftab
- Sandeep Varma as Murali sir
- Deepak Nathan as Usman (College chairman)
- Viswajith Odukkathil as Bolt Anoop
- Hormis Paulachan as Nigil
- Samarth as Samarth
- Rinsa as Anjali
- Vimal Kumar as Vimal, a student who one-sidedly loved Anjali
- Shinos Rahman as Baby
- Jude Anthany Joseph as Dolly D'Cruz
- Jayashankar as Peon
- Vinod Kovoor as Broker Shamsu
- Sandeep Kumar as a regular customer
- Aishwarya Raghavan as Aishwarya
- Pramod P. Jayachandran as Pramod
- Alphonse Puthren as Roney Varghese, Celine's ex-fiancé
- Rajini Chandy as George David's mother
- Sujinesh K Sundar as Nelson

== Production ==
=== Development ===
Following the success of the bilingual thriller Neram (2013), writer-director Alphonse Puthren planned for a Hindi remake for this project. But he decided to remake another film Shutter in Hindi, with Prithviraj Sukumaran being cast as the lead, despite reports stating that Anil Kapoor and Abhay Deol as the leads were surfaced. However, Alphonse eventually shelved the project and decided to work on a fresh script instead. He announced that the film will be titled as Premam, and as the title suggests, the film is said to be a romantic-drama. The project was bankrolled by director-producer Anwar Rasheed under his banner Anwar Rasheed Entertainment and Nivin Pauly was announced playing the lead role, which was his second project with Alphonse in the studio album Yuvvh and Neram. The scripting process began during the same month. Rajesh Murugeshan who has previously composed music for Alphonse's Neram was roped as the music composer.

=== Casting ===
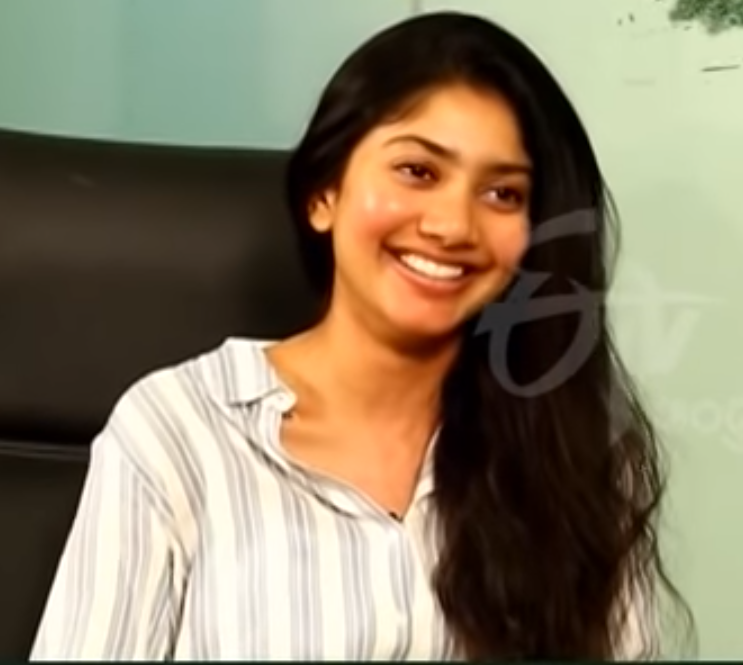
Sai Pallavi signed as the main leading lady of the film with Nivin Pauly

In February 2014, Jude Anthany Joseph announced that he would play a cameo in the film, which will mark his acting debut. Though, the shooting of the film commenced without any leading lady for the film, the team announced that the film would feature three heroines playing the lead. Alphonse invited applications from Malayalam-speaking women between the ages of 16 and 25. Later they released an ad in September 2014 saying the film needed only two heroines and they must be aged between 15 and 22 and "both of them should be able to speak Malayalam and English fluently as well as have a very good smile". The same month, Vinay Forrt was announced playing a comic role in the film, and also joined the shoot during the filming.

Though the details of the female lead were not disclosed initially, it was later revealed that newcomers Anupama Parameswaran, Sai Pallavi and Madonna Sebastian were announced as the female leads. Madonna was initially a playback singer, trained under Carnatic and western music, had sung for composers Deepak Dev and Gopi Sundar. Alphonse initially approached Madonna at one of the television shows she hosted, whether he asked her to act in one of her films for which she agreed. Pallavi, a doctor-cum-dancer, was approached by Alphonse six years before, through clippings from a reality show which she had participated, showcased in Facebook. Alphonse initially gave her an offer to act in his film which she refused, and after six years, he phoned to Pallavi, in which she thought him as a stalker and wanted to lodge a police complaint on him. But later misunderstood after Alphonse forcibly introduced himself. In an interview, Alphonse revealed that Asin was initially considered for the character Malar, played by Pallavi, following a fan's request. The film introduced 17 new actors in the Malayalam film industry.

=== Filming ===
Following the completion of pre-production, the principal photography began in July 2014. The team began filming the first schedule in Goa in August 2014, and returned to Kerala for filming major portions of the film. Major part of the film's shooting took place in locations in and around Aluva, with some scenes were filmed at Union Christian College, Fort Kochi, Chokkampatti Hills and Marthandavarma Bridge. The café which was run by George in the film was set at Pepper House restaurant in Fort Kochi. The entire filming was wrapped up in November 2014.

== Music ==
The original soundtrack and background score were composed by Rajesh Murugesan, who had collaborated with Alphonse in the film Neram (2013). Shabareesh Varma, beside singing, wrote the lyrics for eight of the nine songs. One song "Rockaankuthu" which had lyrics written by Pradeep Palarr was sung by Tamil film composer Anirudh Ravichander. The soundtrack album was released by the record label Muzik 247 on 14 February 2015. All the audio songs released prior to the film release went viral on the internet. In March 2015, video for the song "Aluva Puzha" sung by Vineeth Sreenivasan was released and became the chart topper. "Malare" was released on YouTube on 6 June. The song received 1 million hits within 14 hours of release and trended on all social networking platforms. Apple Music selected it as the "Best Malayalam album" of 2015.

== Release ==
Premam was originally scheduled for a release on the occasion of Christmas (25 December 2014), however, following the post-production delays, the film was postponed to 13 February 2015, in order to coincide with the Valentine's Day weekend. Anwar Rasheed later confirmed that the film will be released within March 2015, although the film was later pushed to April. In the end, the producers announced that the film will be released on 28 May 2015 in Kerala, and the following day in India, clashing with another Nivin Pauly-starrer film Ivide and Tamil film Massu Engira Masilamani. International Business Times called it one of the most awaited film of the year.

A & A Release distributed the film in India, which opened in 85 screens in Kerala alone on 28 May and outside the state, it released the following day in Bangalore, Pune, Mumbai, Coimbatore, Gujarat, Hyderabad, Mysore, Vizag, Delhi, Mangalore, Manipal, Chennai and Goa. It became the first Malayalam film to be released in 43 screens in the UAE on 11 June. Great India Films distributed the film on 12 June in 25 locations in the United States. Indienwood distributed in the Europe, while Tricolor Entertainment released it on 11 June in Australia. Blue Planet Entertainment Ltd handled the release in the UK. Singapore Coliseum released the film in Singapore on 13 June.

=== Marketing ===
The first look of Premam was unveiled on 24 January 2015, which featured a simple title logo designed in the shape of a butterfly. In a unique promotional activity, the film does not have a trailer release instead, two video songs were released as a part of the film promotions. According to Gokul Nath, the head of social media marketing company DigiFaktory, for which Premam became their first venture, he stated that "From the very beginning, I and Alphonse [Alphonse] had a need for an element of suspense. The aim was to present the film as the story of a young lover-boy and nothing else. Alphonse had a clear vision about the film, he knew how he wanted the film to be projected, what about it would draw audiences to the theatre." However, a fan-edited trailer was released in November 2015.

=== Re-release ===
After completing over 250 days theatrical run in Chennai box office, LA Cinema Maris in Trichy and Ram Muthuram Cinemas in Tirunelveli re-released the film on 18 March 2016. It is the first Malayalam film to have a re-release in Tamil Nadu. The film was further re-released in Chennai by Jazz Cinemas along with Vinnaithaandi Varuvaayaa and Raja Rani, for the occasion of Valentine's Day weekend for 10–16 February 2017. It was re-released again in Kerala on the occasion of Nivin Pauly's birthday (11 October 2019).

The film will be re-released once again on 13 February 2026, coinciding with Valentine's Day.

=== Piracy ===
In June 2015, a pirated version of Premam appeared online. The copy had a watermark indicating that it was a "censor copy", or a copy intended for censor board officials to review prior to the film's release. The film's producer, Anwar Rasheed, threatened to resign from Film Producers Association citing their lack of action after the leak was discovered. The police arrested three teenagers in connection with the case, believing them to be involved with film piracy groups. Later, cinema theatre owners protested against the piracy issue by shutting down the theatres.

== Reception ==
=== Critical response ===
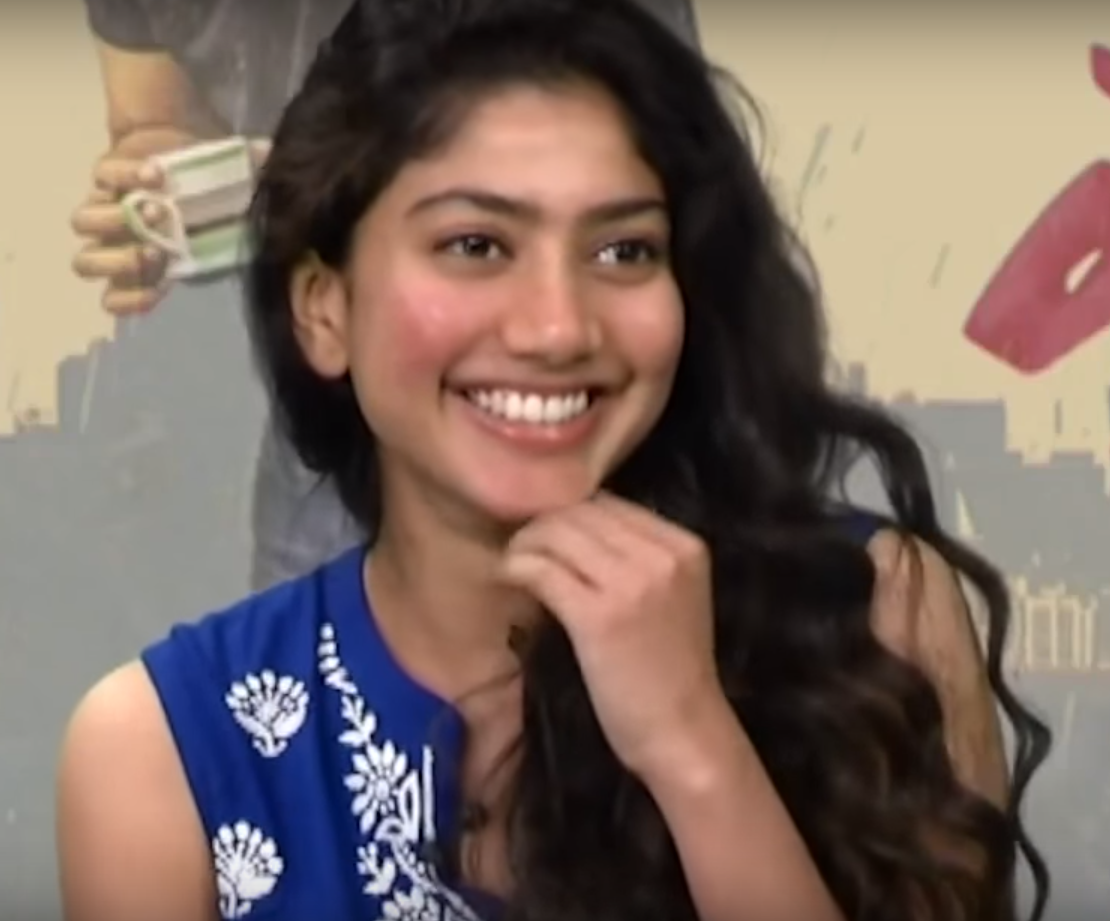
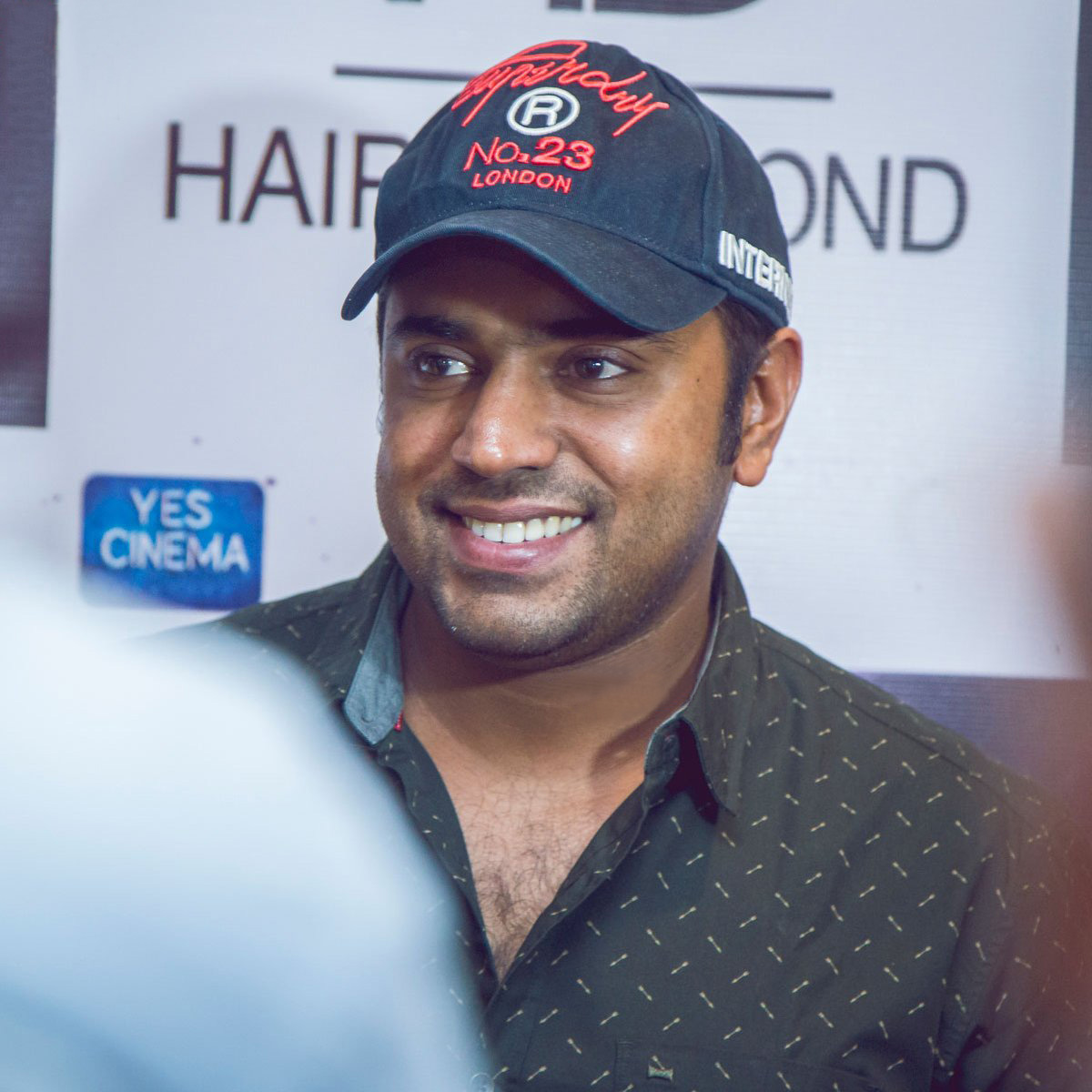
Sai Pallavi and Nivin Pauly were praised by many film critics for their portrayal of Malar and George.

Premam received positive reviews from critics. On the review aggregator website Rotten Tomatoes, 84% of 8 critics' reviews are positive, with an average rating of 8.3/10.

IB Times's reviewer Nicy V.P rated the film 5/5 and stated: "Premam is nothing but entertainment at its best and the movie deserves nothing less than a standing ovation." About the technicalities of the film, she said: "They are just flawless. From background score, songs, sound departments, art, cinematography, editing, costumes and others have come together to make Alphonse Putharen's dream a reality." Veeyen of Nowrunning.com rated the movie 3.5 out of 5 and wrote: "'Premam' elevates Alphonse Puthren onto a pedestal of sharp film makers who have figured out the actual potential of the medium that cinema is. And in their competent hands long-standing tales assume ground-breaking forms and enthuse the viewers in ways and manners never seen before. Much more than an unabashed crowd-pleaser, which it surely is, 'Premam' is a bracingly alive film where almost everything, seems to have fallen right into place." Sify.com rated the film 3.5 in a scale of 5 and said, "Premam is all for some genuine fun and perhaps, a few nostalgic moments as well for 80's and 90's generation. It's a lengthy ride for sure, but it will leave you wanting for more". Paresh C Palicha of Rediff.com rated the film 3 in a scale of 5 and said, "With Premam, Alphonse Putheran proves that he has the knack of presenting themes that have blockbuster written all over." Aswin J Kumar of The Times of India rated the film 3.5/5 and said that Premam is a "movie with a high likeability quotient because it unearths the beauty in trifles." Litty Simon of Malayala Manorama rated 3 out of 5 stars and highly appreciated Alphonse Puthraren's direction, cinematography, music, lead performances, editing and humour. "The simple story is told with amazing visuals. It is humour at its best", "the director has rightly kept his word of expecting nothing big and aptly sticks with the tagline 'The second film in the history of world cinema with nothing fresh'", says the reviewer.

S. R. Praveen of The Hindu said, "Alphonse Puthren's understanding of the medium is evident and he does not appear to try hard at any point." He praised Putharen's script, saying, "The strong point of Alphonse's script is its humour, which is very organic and does not stick out as a separate track." Rejith RG of Kerala Kaumudi said, "Filled with unforgettable moments, characters and song sequences, Premam is a delight to watch. It's after a long time that we got to see such a hugely enjoyable Malayalam film." Mythily Ramachandran of Gulf News called it "A delightful entertainer with Nivin Pauly in the lead" and said, "Premam is a fun film, a simple love story of the boy next door, like its tagline that reads 'nothing extraordinary in it'." Pramod Thomas of The New Indian Express concluded his review saying, "'Premam' is a watchable flick for its realistic treatment of the plot, performance of the newcomers, wits, good songs and for Nivin Pauly."

=== Box office ===
The film earned a gross of ₹1.43 crore (US$150,000) in Kerala On its first day of release. According to trade analyst Sreedhar Pillai, the net collection in Kerala in 3 days is approximately ₹5.60 crore with a distributor share of ₹3.50 crore. But Rediff.com reported a ₹2.35 crore collection within the first four days. Sreedhar Pillai also reported ₹10.3 crore (US$1.1 million) as the film's collection in Kerala alone within the first week of release, adding that it broke the previous records of Keralavarma Pazhassiraja, Drishyam and Bangalore Days. However Gulf News reported, it collected ₹4.5 crore (US$470,000) at the box office in the first week in India. P. V. Basheer also said that the film "would have earned a gross of about ₹5 crore in a week of its release in Kerala, with a distributor share close to ₹3 crore."

The earnings doubled in the second weekend from the first weekend. The film garnered a producer share of ₹11 crore (US$1.1 million) in two weeks and became the most profitable film produced by Anwar Rasheed. The gross collection from Kerala theatres crossed ₹20 crore (US$2.1 million) in 14 day (June 12) of release. The film experienced a 90% to 100% theatre occupancy in the third weekend. In Ernakulam city the film grossed ₹66 lakh (US$69,000) in two weeks from Shenoys, Padma and Sridhar theatres. It grossed ₹30 crore (US$3.1 million) in 25 days, which is a record in Malayalam film industry. In 50 days, the film collected over ₹60 crore from Worldwide box office of which ₹38 crore from Kerala, ₹7.5 crore from Rest of India, ₹2.6 crore from United States and United Kingdom combined and ₹11.5 crore from GCC box office.

The film was released on 12 June in 25 locations in the US distributed by Great India Films. The opening day gross was $26,000 and it raked up over $97,000 in three days in the Us. The US collection reached $106,000 in 4 days, giving tough competition to Bollywood and Tamil cinemas at the US. In two weeks, collection reached $150,000. The film collected $159,398 (₹1.01 crore) in second weekend from Australia.

In its final run, Premam film becomes the highest grossing Malayalam film in UAE-GCC territory by collecting ₹24 crore, in United States by collecting US$236,000 (₹1.76 crore) and also Rest of India box office at that time. The film collected ₹2 crore from Tamil Nadu box office in its 200 days theatrical run making it the highest grossing Malayalam film in Tamil Nadu at that time. The final box office collection is estimated as ₹60 crore (US$6.2 million) worldwide. The film had theatrical run over 151 days in Kerala.

=== Audience response ===
The Hindu reported, "Youngsters are literally mobbing theaters, cash registers are ringing without non-stop, theater owners are being pressured into squeezing in an extra show, and even recommendations are being made for tickets. Due to its right timing in bringing the film onto the screens after a long dullness in the mollywood industry, this love-fantasy film is well accepted in the hearts of Malayalis. The movie seems well on the expressway to becoming a cult movie." P. V. Basheer Ahamed, president of the Kerala Film Exhibitors Federation, said that a similar euphoria was last seen when Mammootty-starrer Rajamanikyam hit theatres in 2005. Nivin Pauly and Sai Pallavi's performance was also appreciated by people inside the film industry.

In Apsara theatre in Kozhikode, a group of audience turned violent and vandalized after some minor technical snag disturbed the screening of the film. The violent mob went on a rampage within minutes and the screening was suspended. The screen was torn apart and chairs were destroyed in the melee. The ruckus continued even after the police reached the spot and resorted to lathi charge. A police officer was injured in the clash. Seven youngsters were taken into custody in connection with the incident.

At least 60 students of various local colleges were caught on Monday, 15 June, by the police for bunking classes to watch Premam. The police action was a part of Operation Gurukulam following complaints that students of various schools and colleges were skipping classes to watch the film. The demand for the tickets led Premam to be the film with maximum additional shows in theatres after Rajamanikyam starring Mammootty.

== Remake ==
Premam was remade into Telugu under the same name, which released in 2016. The film stars Naga Chaitanya and Shruthi Hassan in the lead role reprising Nivin and Pallavi and was directed by Chandoo Mondeti.

== Controversies ==
In July 2015, reports have surfaced that Premam will be remade in Tamil, with Vijay Sethupathi and Hansika Motwani in the lead role reprising Nivin and Pallavi and Dhanush had bagged the remake rights. However, Dhanush had claimed that he did not have the rights for the film. In January 2016, fans of the original film trended the hashtag #SayNoToPremamTamil in the microblogging site Twitter, claiming that Tamil audience do not want to remake the film.

Fans started trolling Naga Chaitanya and Shruti Haasan after the release of the promo song "Evare" (a remake of the Malayalam original song "Malare"), for its Telugu remake claiming that it spoilt the flavour of the original song, and trended their reactions with hilarious memes. Many fans tagged Chaitanya and Shruti's performance as "overacting" and claimed that he and she failed to perfectly reprise Nivin and Pallavi's role from the original.

As the film did not receive a nomination at the Kerala State Film Awards, which is official state film award given by Government of Kerala, several comments were posted in social media expressing their disappointments. Director Aashiq Abu, slammed the jury committee for calling the filmmaking as "lazy" and expressed his displeasure on their decisions. Tamil filmmaker A. R. Murugadoss also expressed the same and called it as "unfair".

== Impact ==
Premam opened to rave response from celebrities with prominent members from Tamil industry: notably Selvaraghavan, Shankar and Vijay lauding Nivin Pauly's performance and Alphonse Puthren's direction. The lead actresses in Premam, Sai Pallavi, Anupama Parameswaran and Madonna Sebastian became overnight celebrities and carved a niche for themselves in the South Indian film industry. Following the 2015 Kerala local elections, the song "Malare" was used as a part of their political campaign. The song "Malare" and one of its dialogues were featured in the most popular songs and dialogues of 2015 by The Times of India. Aluva, where the film was shot became a tourist hotspots with 5,000 visitors per month came within three months after its release. The black shirt and white mundu outfit worn by Nivin's character George and his gang during his college days became trending after the film's release and was sold by the textile stores in Kerala during Onam celebrations in colleges and schools.

== Legacy ==
In the Tamil-language film Master (2021), the protagonist John Durairaj (Vijay), an alcoholic professor, quotes plots from films as the reason why he was addicted to alcoholism, thereby not revealing his backstory. He quoted the film's sub-plot of George's relationship with Malar, as his backstory, in one of the scenes.
