= Yuvvh =

Studio album
- Released: 5 April 2012
- Recorded: Kerala
- Genre: Hip hop
- Label: Sony Music
- Producer: Sony Music

Singles from Yuvvh
- 1. "Nenjodu Cherthu" Released: 5 April 2012

Yuvvh is a Malayalam music album released in 2012 by Sony Music.

== Tracks ==
The music was composed by Saachin and Sreejith, for the lyrics penned by Naveen Marar. "Nenjodu Cherthu" sung by Aalap Raju was an instant hit on YouTube. Produced by Chelorys media, the song Nenjodu Cherthu from Yuvvh got more than 200,000 hits within 4 days of release by Sony Music.

Yuvvh: Track listing
No.	Title	Lyrics	Singer(s)	Length
1.	"Padmanabha Pahi"	Swathi Thirunal	Anjali Muraleedharan	05:21
2.	"Nenjodu Cherthu"	Naveen Marar	Aalap Raju, Devan	04:39
3.	"Venchaayam Vinnil"	Naveen Maraar	Ouseppachen	03:39
4.	"Piriyumen Shishiram"	Naveen Maraar	Swapna Abraham	03:32
5.	"Tu Hi Rang Rangeeli"	Vivek Vashishtha	Job Kurian	04:24
6.	"She's An Indian Girl"	Naveen Maraar	Job Kurian	03:37
7.	"I Can Feel It (Reprise)"	Naveen marar	Sreejith	01:39
8.	"Koduvaali"	Naveen Maraar	Saachin	05:31
Total length:				32:24

== Music video ==
The music video for "Nenjodu Cherthu" was directed by Alphonse Putharen featured Nivin Pauly and Nazriya Nazim.
