= Dhivara =

- Cover of the song featuring actress Tamannaah

Song by Ramya Behara, Deepu

from the album Baahubali: The Beginning
- Released: 31 May 2015
- Genre: Filmi, folk-rock, pop-folk
- Length: 5:53
- Label: Lahari Music
- Songwriter: Ramajogayya Sastry

Music video
- "Dheevara" on YouTube

"Dhivara" is a Telugu song from the soundtrack of the 2015 film Baahubali: The Beginning. Sung by Ramya Behara and Deepu, the song was composed by M.M. Keeravani with lyrics penned by Ramajogayya Sastry. Most of the lyrics of the song were written in Sanskrit.

The music video of the track features Prabhas as Sivudu alias Mahendra Baahubali and Tamannaah as Avantika. In this song, Sivudu completes the task of climbing the waterfall which was earlier thought to be impossible to do, inspired by the sight of Avantika. The song was shot at Orvakal Rock Gardens located at Kurnool in Andhra Pradesh, Athirappilly Falls in Thrissur, Kerala and Western Ghats in Mahabaleshwar, Maharashtra.

== Release ==
The audio of the song released on 31 May 2015 along with other tracks in the album. The music video of the song released on 25 September 2015, through the YouTube channel of T-Series Telugu. The song has received more than 58 million views on YouTube. The song was released in Tamil as Deerane, In Hindi as Khoya Hain and in Malayalam as Njan Chendena.
