= Rajesh Murugesan =

Indian composer

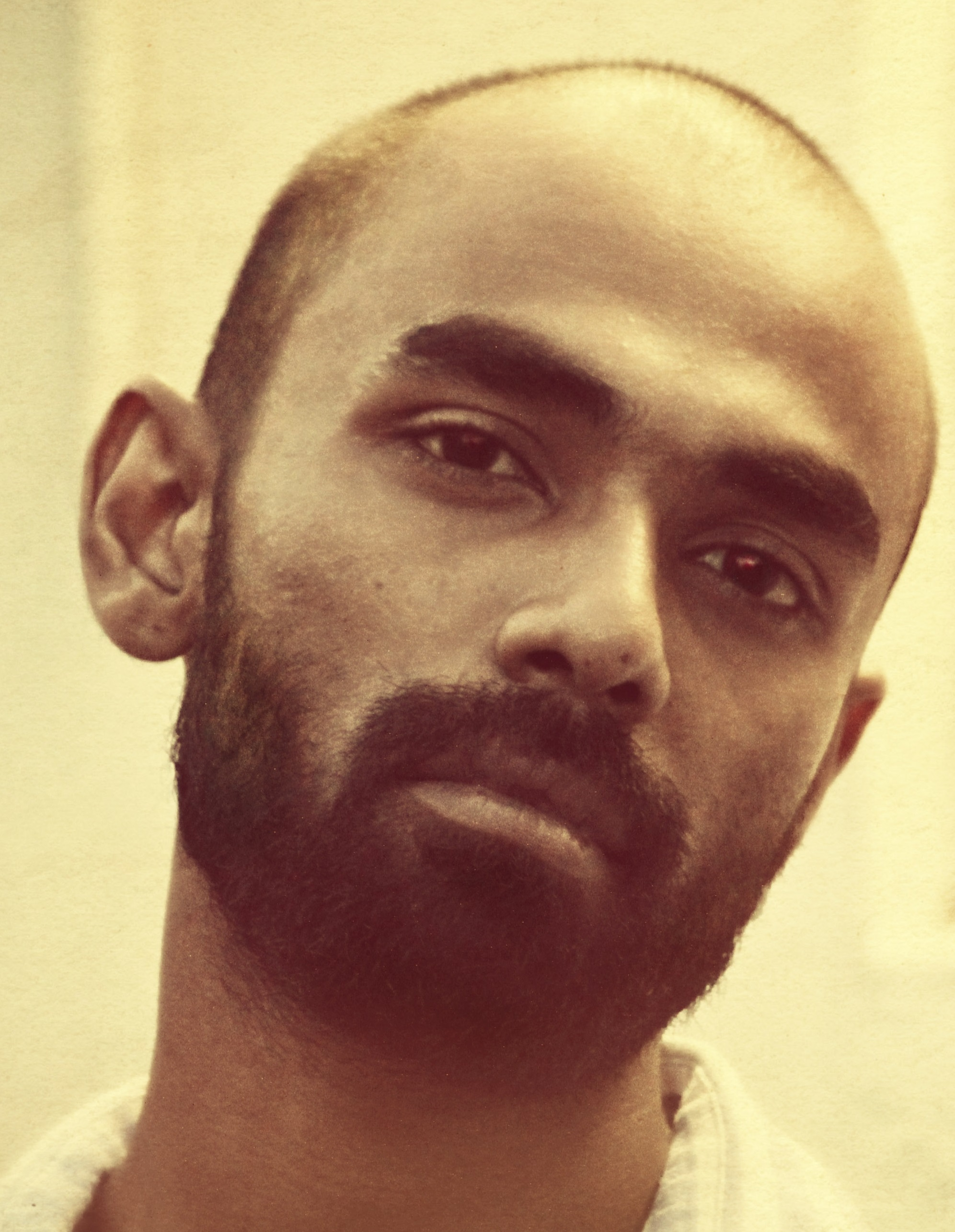
- Rajesh Murugesan
- Born: Rajesh Murugesan; 14 May 1988 (age 38); Nagercoil, Tamil Nadu, India
- Occupation: Music director
- Years active: 2013–present
- Spouse: Aishwarya Raghavan (m. 2020)

Rajesh Murugesan (born 14 May 1988) is an Indian music composer, best known for his compositions in Malayalam cinema for films like Neram and Premam.

== Personal life ==
Murugesan was born in Nagercoil and he completed his schooling at Cochin Refineries School, Ambalamugal, while graduating with a Degree from SAE International College, Chennai in 2008.

== Career ==
Rajesh made his debut as a music director in Neram a Tamil - Malayalam bilingual film which was directed by Alphonse Putharen and released in 2013. The song Pistah also featured as IPL promo song for the year 2016.

== Filmography ==
Year	Title	Language	Songs	Background Score	Notes
2013	Neram	Malayalam	Yes	Yes	
2013	Neram	Tamil	Yes	Yes	
2015	Premam	Malayalam	Yes	Yes	
2015	Time Bara Vait	Marathi	No	Yes	
2016	Action Hero Biju	Malayalam	No	Yes	
2016	Aviyal	Tamil	No	Yes	Segment: Eli
2016	Premam	Telugu	Yes	No	Remake of Premam
2017	Kismath	Kannada	Yes	Yes	Remake of Neram
2018	Thobama	Malayalam	Yes	Yes	
2018	Ladoo	Malayalam	Yes	Yes	
2019	Vasanthi	Malayalam	Yes	Yes	Also sound designer
2020	Ninnila Ninnila	Telugu	Yes	Yes	
2020	Theeni	Tamil	Yes	Yes	
2021	Navarasa	Tamil	No	Yes	Episode - Summer of ‘92
2022	Gold	Malayalam	Yes	Yes	
2023	Vasantha Mullai	Tamil	Yes	Yes	
2023	Appatha	Tamil	Yes	Yes	
2024	Manorathangal	Malayalam	No	Yes	Episode - Shilalikhitham
2024	Pechi	Tamil	No	Yes	
2025	Padakkalam	Malayalam	Yes	Yes	
2025	United Kingdom of Kerala	Malayalam	Yes	Yes	
2025	House Mates	Tamil	Yes	Yes	
2026	Heartin	Tamil	Yes	Yes	
2026	The Pet Detective †	Malayalam	Yes	Yes	

== Awards ==
1. Asianet Comedy Awards 2015 for Best Comical Scene Song
2. CPC Cine Awards 2015 for Best Music Director
3. Vanitha Film Awards 2016 for Best Music Director
4. Asianet Film Awards 18th Asianet film awards for Best Music Director
5. 5th South Indian International Movie Awards for Best Music Director Malayalam
6. IIFA 2016 Award for Best Music Director Malayalam 2016
