= Neram =

2013 Indian film by Alphonse Puthren

- Posters in Malayalam and Tamil
- Directed by: Alphonse Puthren
- Written by: Alphonse Puthren
- Based on: Neram (short) by Alphonse Puthren
- Produced by: Koral Viswanathan
- Starring: Nivin Pauly; Nazriya Nazim; Bobby Simha
- Cinematography: Anend C. Chandran
- Edited by: Alphonse Puthren
- Music by: Rajesh Murugesan
- Production company: Winner Bulls Films
- Distributed by: LJ Films (Malayalam); Red Giant Movies (Tamil)
- Release dates: 10 May 2013 (Malayalam); 17 May 2013 (Tamil)
- Running time: 119 minutes (Malayalam); 117 minutes (Tamil)
- Country: India
- Languages: Malayalam; Tamil
- Budget: ₹1.5 crore
- Box office: est. ₹18 crore

Neram (transl. 'Time') is a 2013 Indian action comedy film written, directed and edited by Alphonse Puthren (in his directorial debut). Malayalam and Tamil languages versions of the film were simultaneously made. The Malayalam version also contains several scenes in Tamil, as both versions of the movie take place in Chennai. It is an extended version of the short film of the same name, which Puthren directed in 2009. It stars Nivin Pauly, Nazriya Nazim (in their Kollywood debuts) and Bobby Simha in both versions. Supporting roles were played by Manoj K. Jayan, Shammi Thilakan, Lalu Alex, and Siju Wilson in the Malayalam version, while Nassar, Thambi Ramiah, John Vijay and Shabareesh Varma portrayed the characters in the Tamil version.

The whole film is set within one day in Chennai. Shooting for the film commenced on mid-2012, were completed in March 2013. The music was scored by debutant Rajesh Murugesan, while cinematography was handled by Anend C. Chendran. The Malayalam version was released on 10 May 2013, while the Tamil version was released a week later, on 17 May 2013.

Neram's both versions received positive reviews upon release and was a commercial success at the box-office. The film is remade in Telugu as Run (2016) starring Sundeep Kishan and in Kannada as Kismath (2018) starring Vijay Raghavendra. This film is about to be remade in Hindi.

== Plot ==
Mathew/Vetri is a computer engineering graduate but lost his job. His life is complicated now because he has taken a loan from a private moneylender named Vatti Raja and is not able to repay the amount because he has no income. Jeena/Veni's father Johnykutty/Saravanar denies her marriage with Mathew/Vetri as he is jobless. Jeena/Veni decides to elope with Mathew/Vetri, and his friend John gives him money for paying off his debt to Raja. On their way, Jeena/Veni's chain is snatched, and Mathew/Vetri's money is stolen. Raja calls Mathew/Vetri and asks him to settle the money within 5PM.

Johnykutty/Saravanar lodges a complaint with SI Ukken Tintu/Katta Kunju against Mathew/Vetri on charges of kidnapping Jeena/Veni and gives his number. Tintu/Kunju calls Mathew/Vetri and tells him that he should come along with Jeena/Veni to the police station within 5PM, but problems are yet to come: Mathew/Vetri's brother-in-law asks some amount of money from him to start a business, and even that is scheduled for 5PM. On the other hand, Jeena/Veni is kidnapped by Raja's men, assuming her to be another man's girlfriend who also has to return money to Raja.

Mathew/Vetri comes across the same man and decides to snatch his chain, but unfortunately at the moment he tries to do so, the man meets with an accident, and Mathew/Vetri takes him to a hospital. The man's brother RayBan/Dhandapani, who has influence, assures Mathew/Vetri of a job in his company. Suddenly, Tintu/Kunju arrives there and tells that Raja died in an accident. It is revealed that Lighthouse, the man who stole Jeena/Veni's chain and Mathew/Vetri's money, had also borrowed some money from Raja. Lighthouse planned with two others in having the money for themselves and stole Raja's car.

While the plan worked out perfectly, Raja's men went behind the car, and Raja goes behind the other man. In the chase, Raja was hit by an auto and died. Coincidentally, the auto driver was the driver who hit RayBan/Dhandapani's brother Manick with his vehicle, too. Later, Mathew/Vetri meets the men who stole his money and gets in a brawl with them. He finds his money and a chain inside the car and also finds Jeena/Veni in the car's rear (Raja hid her in his car). Mathew/Vetri gives the money to his brother-in-law, and the movie ends with a happy note that "Time is of two types: good time and bad time. Good will come following every bad time in life".

== Cast ==
Actor (Malayalam)	Actor (Tamil)	Role (Malayalam)	Role (Tamil)
Nivin Pauly		Mathew	Vetri
Nazriya Nazim		Jeena	Veni
Bobby Simha		Vatti Raja	Vatti Raja
Krishna Shankar	Ananth Nag	Manikunju (Manick)	Manickam (Manick)
Lalu Alex	Thambi Ramaiah	Johnykutty, Jeena's father	Saravanar, Veni's father
Shammi Thilakan	John Vijay	Sub-Inspector Ukken Tintu	Sub-Inspector K. Katta Kunju
Charle		Mayilsamy	Mayilsamy
Crane Manohar		Auto Rickshaw Driver	Auto Rickshaw Driver
Anand Chandrababu			
Ramesh Thilak		Lighthouse	Lighthouse
D. Crawford			
Willson Joseph	Shabareesh Varma	John	John
Joju George	Sai Prashanth	Jiju, Mathew's brother-in-law	Vetri's brother-in-law
Laxmi		Jeena's mother	Veni's mother
Sharaf U Dheen		Tutor	Tutor
Akhilan			
Deepak Nathan			
Vijay Muthu		Police Officer	Police Officer
Manoj K. Jayan	Nassar	Rayban	M. Dhandapaani
Anju Kurian		Mathew's sister	Vetri's sister
Munishkanth (uncredited)		Rayban's sidekick	Dhandapaani's sidekick

== Production ==
=== Development ===
Alphonse Puthren who made several short films and also the studio album Yuvvh had announced his directorial debut after the album's success that prompted him to move to the feature film format. He announced that the film will be titled as Neram which would be a "thriller-cum-black comedy" set in Chennai's Mandaveli, where he had lived for some time. He further added that the film's title and the story is all about the significance of time in human lives. It was considered to be an extended version of the short film of the same name starring Vijay Sethupathi, which he directed in 2009.

=== Casting ===
Initially Alphonse wrote the script with Jai and Vaibhav as the lead actors who declined the offers citing schedule conflicts. Later his friend and actor Nivin Pauly, who contributed to the short film by offering him a budget of ₹3,000 for the project, was approached as the lead actor, marking his debut in Tamil cinema. It was Nivin's second project he signed after his breakthrough with the Malayalam film Thattathin Marayathu. Bhama was chosen as the lead actress against Nivin and had also shot for ten days, but due to her busy schedules, she was replaced by Nazriya Nazim as the lead actress, who also made her debut in Tamil with the film. Alphonse decided to shoot it simultaneously in Tamil and Malayalam. He modified the Malayalam version and filmed it with an entirely different cast, retaining only the lead pair in both versions. Rajesh Murugesan, who had worked with Alphonse on his short films, was chosen as the film's composer, also making his feature film debut.

=== Filming ===
The crew began filming by June 2012, which was first held across various parts of Tamil Nadu, and later in Chennai. Shooting was further carried out in Chennai in August 2012, with Bhama's portions being reshot with Nazriya. In March 2013, Alphonse informed that the entire filming had been completed. The film was shot in Malayalam and in Tamil at the same time, which Nivin described as tough and challenging.

== Music ==
Rajesh Murugesan composed the soundtrack and film score of Neram, making his feature film debut. A promotional song titled "Pistah" performed by Shabareesh Varma, was released on 29 March 2013 and went viral. The audio of the film's Tamil and Malayalam versions were released on 3 May 2013 under the Think Music label.

== Release ==
The first look posters of the film was released on 21 February 2013. On 28 March 2013, Red Giant Movies, production house of Udhayanidhi Stalin acquired the film's distribution rights in Tamil Nadu, while the film was distributed in Kerala by Lal Jose, under his production house LJ Films. Trailers in both languages were released on 19 April 2013.

The Malayalam version was released on 10 May 2013, in 73 screens across Kerala, while the Tamil version was released on 17 May 2013 in 200 plus screens in Tamil Nadu.

The satellite rights of the film's Tamil version were sold to Sun TV and the rights of the film's Malayalam version was acquired by Mazhavil Manorama. AP International released the Malayalam version on Blu-ray, DVD and VCD on 1 August 2013.

== Reception ==
=== Critical reception ===
Neram received positive reviews from critics with praise towards the cast performances (particularly Nivin, Nazriya and Simha), cinematography, editing, black comedy, screenwriting and direction.

==== Malayalam version ====
Padmakumar K of Malayala Manorama rated 2.5 out of 5 stars and wrote "Though the concept is nothing new, the way of presentation and the setting is a merited deviation from the beaten track. The movie is watchable for some surprises it throws up now and then. There are some unseen extraordinary scenes and events not usually seen in Malayalam cinema." The reviewer praised the film's technical aspects, especially Alphonse Puthren's editing and direction, and Anand C. Chandran's camera works. He also praised the acting by Manoj K. Jayan, Simhaa, Shammi Thilakan and Nazriya Nazim while commenting that Nivin "still has to come out of his usual self". Sify gave the verdict as "good" and wrote "For a debut attempt with lots of fresh faces in its cast and crew, director Alphonse Puthren's Neram could leave you pleasantly surprised. With a rather okay script, the film scores with a brilliant narration, interesting performances, good visuals and peppy music." Aswin J Kumar of The Times of India rated 3.5 out of 5 stars and wrote "Neram has a romantic charm, an exciting trait which infuses it with a good measure of likability." Paresh C Palicha of Rediff rated 2.5 out of 5 stars and wrote "Neram has an interesting narrative but lacks on the humour quotient".

==== Tamil version ====
IANS rated 4 out of 5 stars and wrote "There is absolutely nothing new about the story, yet what differentiates Neram from other films is its brilliant non-linear screenplay, never seen before in Tamil cinema. The film grows on you very gradually despite its brooding first half, but what follows post interval is top class and is worth every applaud or hoot that came its way." Baradwaj Rangan of The Hindu appreciates the film's narrative style and cinematography, but commented "Almost everything is perfect on paper. But something is lost on screen. We feel we should be laughing more, and that there are a few too many flat passages." Malini Mannath of The New Indian Express wrote "the light, interesting narrative style and quirky characters makes it [the film] a pleasant one-time watch." N. Venkateswaran of The Times of India rated the film 3.5 out of 5 stars and wrote "Alphonse Puthren is a welcome addition to the new wave of Tamil film directors, and is a sign of the good times ahead for Indian cinema." Mythily Ramachandran of Gulf Times wrote "Alphonse joins the league of a growing number of young directors in Tamil and Malayalam who are making a mark with their fresh ideas and novel presentation. Neram is a delightful way to while away time." Sify gave the verdict as "Good" and concluded the review saying, "Neram is genuinely a good attempt to make something unusual by a group of youngsters, which has to be encouraged."

=== Box office ===
The film netted ₹81 lakh (US$84,000) from 73 screens in its opening weekend (10–12 May) in Kerala.

== Awards and nominations ==
Award	Date of ceremony (Note: Date is linked to the article about the awards held that year, wherever possible.)	Category	Recipient(s)	Result	Ref.
Asiavision Awards	15 November 2013	New Sensation in Acting	Nazriya Nazim	Won	
Asianet Film Awards	10 January 2014	Best Star Pair	Nivin Pauly & Nazriya Nazim	Won	
Ananda Vikatan Cinema Awards	8 January 2014	Best Debut Actor	Nivin Pauly	Won	
Ananda Vikatan Cinema Awards	8 January 2014	Best Debut Actress	Nazriya Nazim	Won	
Vanitha Film Awards	18 January 2014	Best Comedian	Shammi Thilakan	Won	
Tamil Nadu State Film Awards	August 2017	Special Jury Award	Nazriya Nazim	Won	
Vijay Awards	5 July 2014	Best Story, Screenplay Writer	Alphonse Puthren	Nominated	
Vijay Awards	5 July 2014	Best Debut Actor	Nivin Pauly	Nominated	
Vijay Awards	5 July 2014	Best Debut Actress	Nazriya Nazim	Won	
Vijay Awards	5 July 2014	Best Supporting Actor	Bobby Simha	Nominated	
Filmfare Awards South	12 July 2014	Best Male Debut – Tamil	Nivin Pauly	Won	
Filmfare Awards South	12 July 2014	Best Female Debut – Tamil	Nazriya Nazim	Won	
South Indian International Movie Awards	12—13 September 2014	Best Debut Director – Malayalam	Alphonse Puthren	Won	
South Indian International Movie Awards	12—13 September 2014	Best Male Debut – Tamil	Nivin Pauly	Nominated	
South Indian International Movie Awards	12—13 September 2014	Best Female Debut – Tamil	Nazriya Nazim	Nominated	
South Indian International Movie Awards	12—13 September 2014	Best Actor in a Negative Role – Malayalam	Bobby Simha	Nominated	
South Indian International Movie Awards	12—13 September 2014	Best Actor in a Negative Role – Tamil	Bobby Simha	Nominated	
South Indian International Movie Awards	12—13 September 2014	Best Fight Choreographer – Malayalam	Run Ravi	Nominated	

== Remakes ==
The film was remade in Telugu as Run (2016) and in Kannada as Kismath (2018). Alphonse has announced intentions for a Hindi remake to the film which he will direct.
