= Shabareesh Varma =

Indian Malayalam singer, actor, lyricist

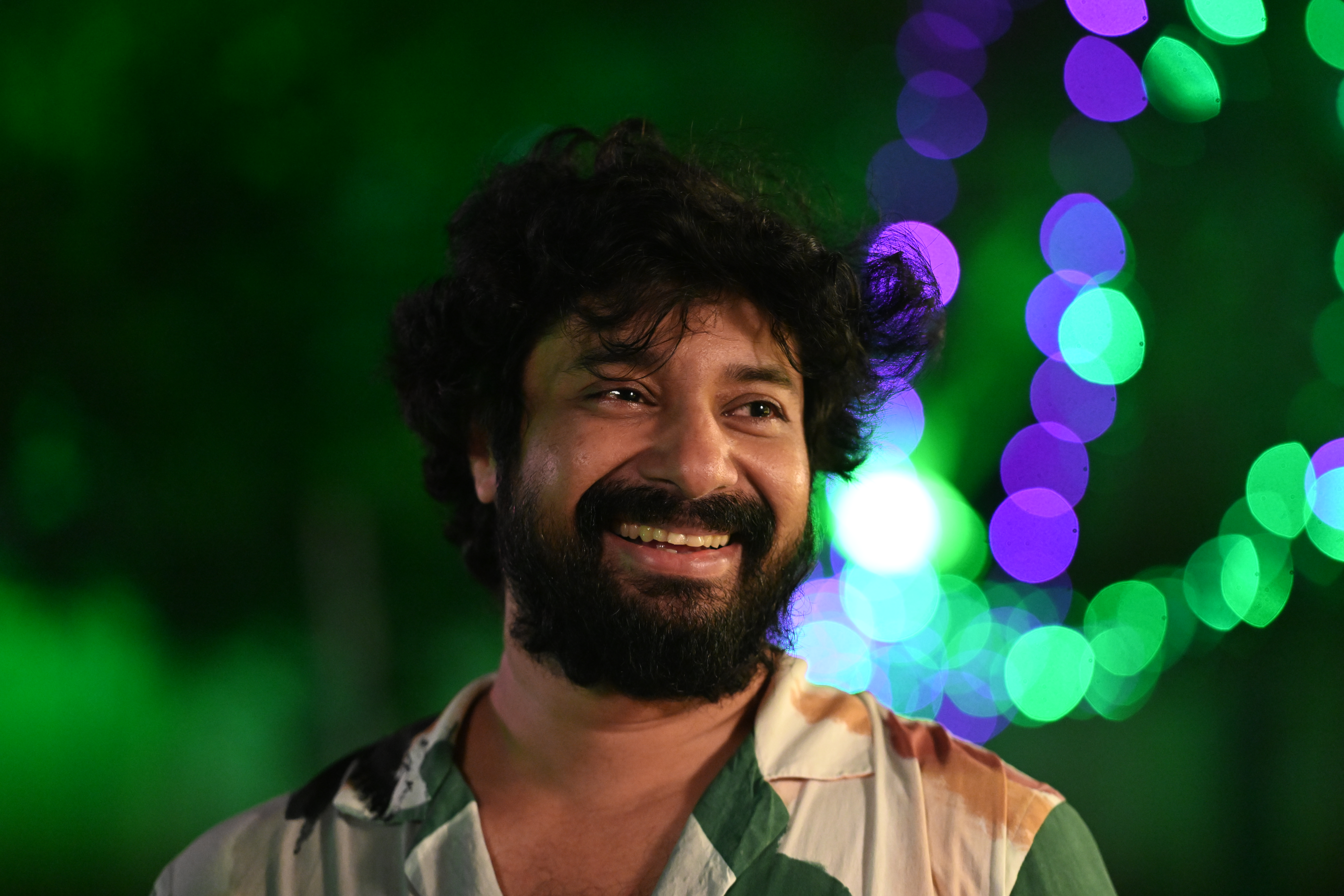
- Shabareesh in a shooting location
- Born: Shabareesh Varma; North Paravur, Kerala, India
- Occupations: Lyricist; singer; actor
- Years active: 2010–present
- Notable work: Premam; Kannur Squad; Turbo

Shabareesh Varma is an Indian lyricist, playback singer and actor who works in Malayalam films.

== Personal life ==
Varma was born to P. K Nandan Varma and Sulekha Varma in North Paravur, Ernakulam. After completing his graduation from MES College Marampally, Aluva, he studied at the SAE Institute, in Chennai and graduated with a degree in Audio Engineering and Music Production. He began his acting with two short films "Cling-Cling" and "Neram" (short film) in which he played the protagonist.

== Career ==
He debuted as an actor, lyricist and playback singer in the 2013 film Neram directed by Alphonse Puthren. In 2015, he was an actor and lyricist in Puthren's second directorial, Premam. In 2023, he starred alongside Mammootty as a police officer in Kannur Squad.

The song Pistah, which Shabareesh sang for Neram, was the promo song for the Indian Premier League. In 2016, he sang the official theme song of the Manjappada which is the supporters group of the football team Kerala Blasters. In 2020, he wrote one song for Yennum Yellow, an album released by Kerala Blasters as a tribute to their fans. He also performed the song 'Vaa Varika Vaa' written by Manu Manjith and Nikhil Thomas.

== Filmography ==
- All films are in Malayalam, unless otherwise noted.

== Discography ==
Year	Song	Film	Singer(s)
2013	Pistah Sumakiraya (Additional Lyrics)	Neram	Shabareesh Varma
2015	Scene Contra	Premam	Shabareesh Varma
2015	Malare	Premam	Vijay Yesudas
2015	Ithu Puthan Kaalam	Premam	Shabareesh Varma
2015	Pathivayi Njan	Premam	Shabareesh Varma
2015	Kaalam Kettu poyi	Premam	Shabareesh Varma
2015	Kalippu	Premam	Murali Gopy, Shabareesh Varma
2015	Aluva Puzhayude	Premam	Vineeth Sreenivasan
2015	Selfie	Double Barrel	Shabareesh Varma, K S Krishnan, Prashant Pillai
2015	Athala Pithala	Double Barrel	Arun Kamath, Shabareesh Varma, Rahul R Govinda, Gagan Baderiya
2015	Kadala Varuthu	Double Barrel	Shabareesh Varma
2015	Arikil Ninnarikil	Rock Star	P. Jayachandran
2015	Puthiya Puthiya	Rock Star	Siddharth Menon, Arun Kamath, Preeti Pillai, Prashant Pillai
2016	Anuraga Karikinvellam	Anuraga Karikkin Vellam	Peethambaran Menon, Govind Menon
2016	Poyimaranjo	Anuraga Karikkin Vellam	Preeti Pillai, Arun Kamath
2016	Neeyoo Njano	Anuraga Karikkin Vellam	Vaikom Vijayalakshmi, Niranj, Shabareesh Varma, Sreerag Saji
2017	Madhumatiye	Sakhavu	Shreekumar Vakkiyil, Preeti Pillai
2018	Get Out House	Naam	Shabareesh Varma
2018	Tanka Takkara	Naam	Shabareesh Varma, Niranj Suresh, Sooraj Santhosh, Suchith
2018	Adichu Polichu	Naam	Shabareesh Varma, Niranj Suresh, Sooraj Santhosh, Suchith
2018	Thudikottunne	Naam	Niranj Suresh
2018	Alakalay Uyarum	Naam	Haricharan Seshadri
2018	Azhakiyane	Naam	Vijay Yesudas, Haricharan Seshadri
2018	Neeye Neeye	Mandharam	Neha Venugopal, Niranj Suresh
2018	Karineela Kanna Kanna	Ladoo	Rajesh Murugesan and Shabareesh Varma
2019	Vanil Chandrika	Luca	Arvind Venugopal, Zia Ul Haq
2022	Kumkumamaake	Brahmāstra (Malayalam dubbed version)	Hesham Abdul Wahab
2022	Piri Ilaki Aadi	Brahmāstra (Malayalam dubbed version)	Benny Dayal
2022	Deva Deva	Brahmāstra (Malayalam dubbed version)	Hesham Abdul Wahab, Arya Dhayal
2022	Alare	Member Rameshan 9am ward	Nithya Mammen, Ayraan
2022	Lokam	Member Rameshan 9am ward	Vineeth Sreenivasan
2022	Thaaram	Member Rameshan 9am ward	Arjun Ashokan
2022	Punch Triple punch	Jaya Jaya Jaya Jaya Hey	Shabareesh Varma, Ankit Menon
2022	Jhalak Rani	Jaya Jaya Jaya Jaya Hey	Zia Ul Haq
2022	Karalo Veruthe	Oh Meri Laila	Sid Sriram
2022	Thiramaalayaay	Oh Meri Laila	Ankit Menon
2025	Whistle'u Bigil'u	Padakkalam	Shabareesh Varma, Suroor Musthafa, Rajesh Murugesan
2026	Thooki	Vaazha II: Biopic of a Billion Bros	Maalavika Sundar

=== As actor ===
Key
†	Denotes films that have not yet been released

Year	Title	Role	Notes
2013	Neram	John	Tamil version only
2015	Premam	Shambu	
2018	Naam	Harris Mohammed	
2018	Ladoo	SK	
2018	Thobama	Vijay	
2019	Thanneer Mathan Dinangal	Siju	
2020	Mariyam Vannu Vilakkoothi	Balu	
2021	Vasanthi	Chandhu	
2021	Bheemante Vazhi	Vivek Guddalli Tachisthu	
2022	Member Rameshan 9 am Ward	Subbu	
2022	Upachara Purvam Gunda Jayan	Reji	
2022	Anthakashri	Ananthan	
2022	Pathrosinte Padappukal	Sharath Panicker	
2022	Kochaal	Shijo Mathew	
2022	Trojan	Anand	
2022	Gold	CPO Gireesh	
2022	Oh Meri Laila	Yohannan	
2023	Vellari Pattanam	Baburaj	
2023	Sulaikha Manzil	Ramzan	
2023	Kannur Squad	Muhammed Shafi	
2024	Turbo	Jerry	
2025	Pravinkoodu Shappu	Thotta Biju	
2025	Dheeran	Spineesh	
2025	Sahasam	Saam	
2025	Paathirathri	Felix	
2025	Inspection Bungalow	Sub-Inspector Vishnu	
2026	Derby		

=== As playback singer ===
Year	Song	Film	Singer
2013	Thaka Thaka	Neram	Shabareesh Varma
2013	Pistah	Neram	Shabareesh Varma
2015	Scene Contra	Premam	Shabareesh Varma
2015	Ithu Puthan Kaalam	Premam	Shabareesh Varma
2015	Pathivayi Njan	Premam	Shabareesh Varma, Rajesh Murugesan
2015	Kaalam Kettu Poyi	Premam	Shabareesh Varma
2015	Kalippu	Premam	Murali Gopy, Shabareesh Varma
2015	Selfie	Double Barrel	Shabareesh Varma, K S Krishnan, Prashant Pillai
2015	Athala Pithala	Double Barrel	Arun Kamath, Shabareesh Varma, Rahul R Govinda, Gagan Baderiya
2015	Kadala Varuthu	Double Barrel	Shabareesh Varma
2018	Get out House	Naam	Shabareesh Varma
2018	Ellarum Onnani	Naam	Shabareesh Varma, Niranj Suresh, Sooraj Santhosh, Suchith
2018	Adichu Polichu	Naam	Shabareesh Varma, Niranj Suresh, Sooraj Santhosh, Suchith
2018	Dhiname Dhinanme	Sketch	Vineeth Sreenivasan, Mukesh, Shabareesh Varma
2018	Karineela Kanna Kanna	Ladoo	Rajesh Murugesan and Shabareesh Varma
2022	Raman thedum	Oh Meri Laila	Shabareesh Varma
2022	Punch Triple punch	Jaya Jaya Jaya Jaya Hey	Shabareesh Varma, Ankit Menon
2022	Gunda Gunda Gunda jayan	Upacharapoorvam Gunda Jayan	Shabareesh Varma
2024	Tharavadi Atrocity (Promo Song)	Bharathanatyam	Aju Varghese, Shabareesh Varma
2025	Whistle'u Bigil'u	Padakkalam	Shabareesh Varma, Suroor Musthafa, Rajesh Murugesan

=== Television ===
Year	Title	Role	Channel	Ref.
2026	Comedy Cooks	Contestant	Asianet	
