= Alphonse Puthren =

Indian film director and screenwriter

- Born: 10 February 1984 (age 42); Aluva, Kerala, India
- Occupations: Film director; Film editor; Screenwriter; Actor
- Years active: 2011–present
- Spouse: Aleena Mary Antony (m. 2015)
- Children: 2

Alphonse Puthren is an Indian film director, film producer, actor, editor, screenwriter and ad film maker, who works mainly in Malayalam cinema. He made his directorial debut with the critically acclaimed Malayalam - Tamil bilingual suspense-thriller Neram (2013). His second film was the sensational blockbuster coming-of-age romantic film Premam (2015). After 7 years, he came back with Gold starring Prithviraj Sukumaran and Nayanthara in the lead roles.

== Early and personal life ==
Alphonse Puthren was born in Aluva, Kerala to Daisy Chacko and Puthren Paul of the Manjooran house. He attended schools including Mount Tabor School Kalamassery, St. Aloysius High School North Paravur and higher secondary from Amrita Vidyalayam. He completed his Bachelor of Computer Application (BCA) from MES College Marampally, Aluva and later moved on to Chennai, earning a diploma in filmmaking from S. A. E. College, Chennai.

Alphonse is married to Aleena Mary Anthony since 26 August 2015. She is the daughter of popular film producer Alwyn Anthony, who is the owner of Ananya Films. They have a son Ethan (born 2016) and daughter Aina (born 2018).

== Career ==
After graduating, Alphonse started making short films and music videos. Arkan and Sutrum Vizhi were his earliest works, completed in college. In 2008, he made the short film Cling Cling. His next work was Neram, a short film which featured Vijay Sethupathi playing a pivotal character. Alphonse later made the music video Flavours, the video of which was shot using stop motion technique. His next short film was The Angel, employing actors Vijay Sethupathi and Bobby Simha in lead roles. Alphonse directed the Malayalam music video Dhaaham, with music by Rajesh Murugesan. Alphonse directed the music video Nenjodu Cherthu from the album Yuvvh, with music by Saachin-Sreejith. The video starring Nivin Pauly and Nazriya Nazim became "hugely popular". His next short film was Eli - a sexy tale which had Bobby Simha, Nivin Pauly and Rajeev Pillai as part of the cast and was produced by actor/director/singer Vineeth Sreenivasan.

Alphonse made his entry into the field of advertising by directing the commercial for Bangs Fried Chicken, a fast food chain.

He made his debut in feature films in 2013 with Neram, the full-length feature film version of his short film. The film is bilingual in Tamil and Malayalam and starred Nivin Pauly, Nazriya Nazim and Bobby Simha in lead roles. He wrote the screenplay and also edited the film. He directed the film Premam in 2015 which starred Nivin Pauly, while also writing the screenplay, editing and acting in a cameo role in the film. The film went on to become a blockbuster at the box office and became one of the highest grossing Malayalam films of all time. In April 2017, Alphonse issued a statement in his social media saying that his third directorial film would be a Tamil language film.

Alphonse Puthren edited the trailers of Thattathin Marayathu (directed by Vineeth Sreenivasan), Oppam, Marakkar (both directed by Priyadarshan) and Retro (directed by Karthik Subburaj). He also edited the "Ding Dong Promo Cut" for the film Super Deluxe.

== Filmography ==
=== As director ===
Year	Film	Language	Notes	Ref.
2013	Neram	Malayalam; Tamil	Bilingual film	
2015	Premam	Malayalam		
2016	Aviyal	Tamil	Anthology film; Segment : "Eli"	
2022	Gold	Malayalam		
TBA	Vijayam	Malayalam		

=== As producer ===
Year	Title	Language	Ref
2018	Thobama	Malayalam	

=== As actor ===
Year	Title	Role	Language	Notes	Ref.
2001	Dheena	Chitra's stalker	Tamil	Uncredited	
2015	Premam	Roney Varghese	Malayalam	Also director	
2025	United Kingdom of Kerala	Mathews	Malayalam		
2025	Balti	Soda Babu	Malayalam; Tamil	Bilingual film	
2025	Sarvam Maya	Dr. Rafael	Malayalam	Cameo appearance	
2026	Vaazha II: Biopic of a Billion Bros	DySP Xavier Alexander	Malayalam		
2026	Kattalan	Alokah's gang leader	Malayalam	Special appearance	
2026	Cosmic Samson †	TBA	Malayalam		

=== Other work ===
Year	Title	Credited as		Language	Notes
Year	Title	Director	Editor	Language	Notes
2009	Neram	Yes		Tamil	Short films
2011	The Angel	Yes	Yes	Tamil	Short films
2011	Eli - a sexy tale (Note: The short film was later included in the 2016 Tamil anthology film Aviyal.)	Yes	Yes	Tamil	Short films
	Neer (Note: The short film was later included in the 2015 Tamil anthology film Bench Talkies.)		Yes	Tamil	Short films
	Reg: We		Yes	Silent	Short films
	Karuppu and Vellai		Yes	Tamil	Short films
	Flavors Theme	Yes		English	Music video
