= List of accolades received by Thondimuthalum Driksakshiyum =

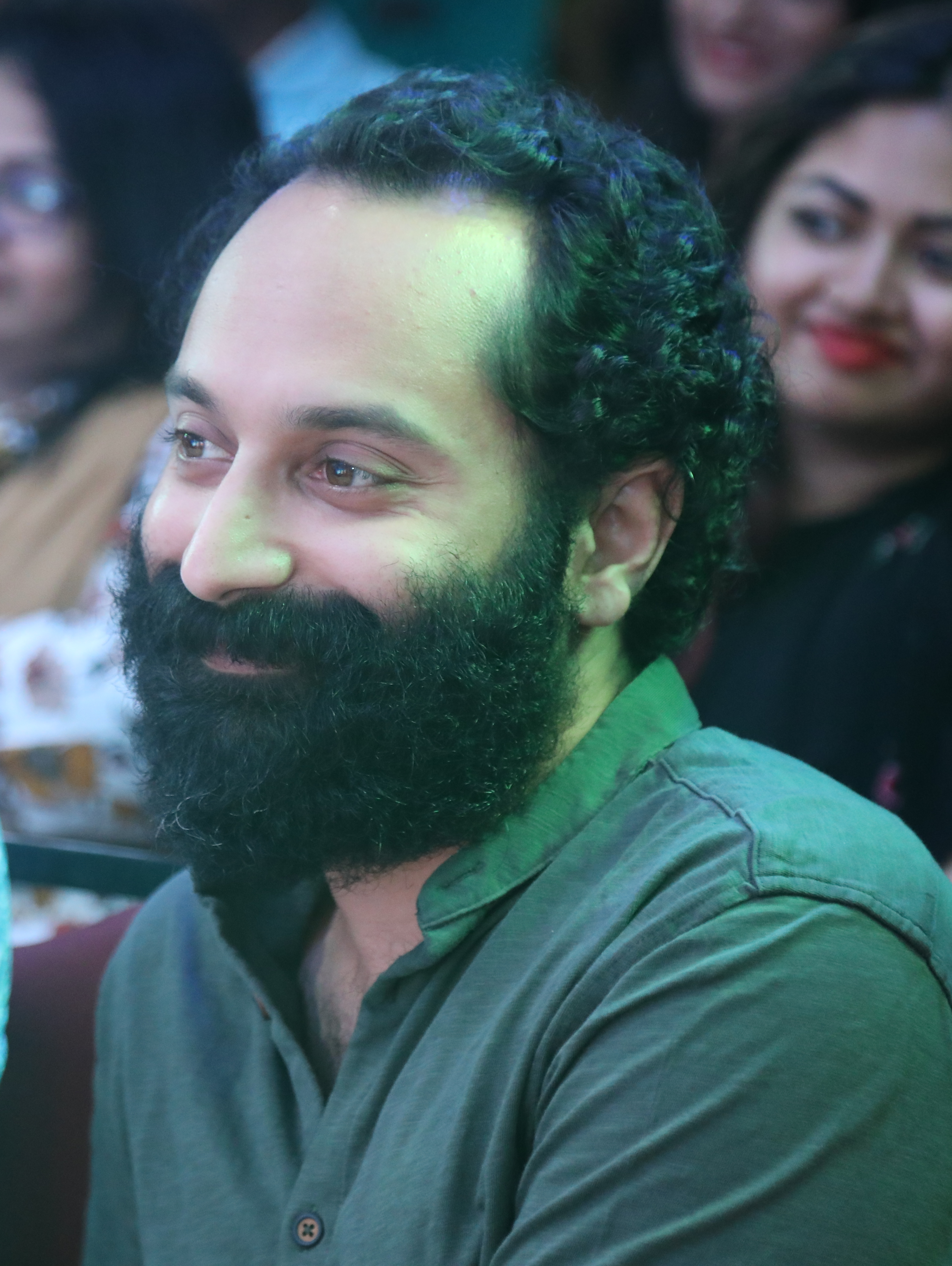
- Fahadh Faasil's performance in Thondimuthalum Driksakshiyum garnered him several awards and nominations
Accolades
| Award | Won | Nominated |
| Asianet Film Awards | 8 | 8 |
| Asiavision Awards | 2 | 2 |
| CPC Cine Awards | 6 | 6 |
| Film Critics Circle of India | 0 | 1 |
| Filmfare Awards South | 4 | 5 |
| Indian Film Festival of Melbourne | 0 | 1 |
| International Film Festival of Kerala | 1 | 1 |
| Kerala Film Critics Association Awards | 3 | 3 |
| Kerala State Film Awards | 2 | 2 |
| National Film Awards | 3 | 3 |
| South Indian International Movie Awards | 3 | 9 |
| Vanitha Film Awards | 4 | 4 |
- Total number of awards and nominations (Note: Awards in certain categories do not have prior nominations and only winners are announced by the jury. For simplification and to avoid errors, each award in this list has been presumed to have had a prior nomination.)
| Totals | 36 | 45 |
- References

Thondimuthalum Driksakshiyum is a 2017 Indian Malayalam-language thriller-drama film directed by Dileesh Pothan. The film stars Fahadh Faasil, Suraj Venjaramoodu, Nimisha Sajayan, Alencier Ley Lopez, Vettukili Prakash, and Sibi Thomas. It was written by Sajeev Pazhoor along with Syam Pushkaran who was also creative director. Bijibal composed the music while Rajeev Ravi handled the cinematography.

Produced on a budget of ₹65 million, Thondimuthalum Driksakshiyum was released on 30 June 2017 and grossed ₹175 million in Kerala. The film was cited as one of the "Top 5 Malayalam movies in 2017" and "The 25 best Malayalam films of the decade" by The Hindu. The film garnered awards and nominations in several categories, with particular praise for its direction, screenplay and Fahadh's performance. The film won 36 awards from 45 nominations.

== Awards and nominations ==
| Award (Note: Awards, festivals and organizations are in alphabetical order.) | Date of ceremony (Note: Date is linked to the article about the awards held that year, wherever possible.) | Category | Recipient(s) | Result | Ref. |
|---|---|---|---|---|---|
| Asianet Film Awards | 20 May 2018 | Best Film | Thondimuthalum Driksakshiyum | Won | |
| Asianet Film Awards | 20 May 2018 | Best Scriptwriter | Sajeev Pazhoor | Won | |
| Asianet Film Awards | 20 May 2018 | Best Actor | Fahadh Faasil | Won | |
| Asianet Film Awards | 20 May 2018 | Best Character Actor | Suraj Venjaramoodu | Won | |
| Asianet Film Awards | 20 May 2018 | Best Supporting Actor | Alencier Ley Lopez | Won | |
| Asianet Film Awards | 20 May 2018 | Best Music Director | Bijibal | Won | |
| Asianet Film Awards | 20 May 2018 | Best Lyricist | Rafeeq Ahamed | Won | |
| Asianet Film Awards | 20 May 2018 | Best Editing | Kiran Das | Won | |
| Asiavision Awards | 24 November 2017 | Best Film | Thondimuthalum Driksakshiyum | Won | |
| Asiavision Awards | 24 November 2017 | Outstanding Performer of the Year – Male | Suraj Venjaramoodu | Won | |
| CPC Cine Awards | 18 February 2018 | Best Movie | Thondimuthalum Driksakshiyum | Won | |
| CPC Cine Awards | 18 February 2018 | Best Scriptwriter | Sajeev Pazhoor | Won | |
| CPC Cine Awards | 18 February 2018 | Best Cinematographer | Rajeev Ravi | Won | |
| CPC Cine Awards | 18 February 2018 | Best Actor | Fahadh Faasil | Won | |
| CPC Cine Awards | 18 February 2018 | Best Actor in Character Role | Alencier Ley Lopez | Won | |
| CPC Cine Awards | 18 February 2018 | Best Editor | Kiran Das | Won | |
| Film Critics Circle of India | 2018 | Best Film | Thondimuthalum Driksakshiyum | Nominated | |
| Filmfare Awards South | 16 June 2018 | Best Film – Malayalam | Thondimuthalum Driksakshiyum | Won | |
| Filmfare Awards South | 16 June 2018 | Best Director – Malayalam | Dileesh Pothan | Won | |
| Filmfare Awards South | 16 June 2018 | Best Actor – Malayalam | Fahadh Faasil | Won | |
| Filmfare Awards South | 16 June 2018 | Best Actress – Malayalam | Nimisha Sajayan | Nominated | |
| Filmfare Awards South | 16 June 2018 | Best Supporting Actor – Malayalam | Alencier Ley Lopez | Won | |
| Indian Film Festival of Melbourne | 10–22 August 2018 | Best Actor | Fahadh Faasil | Nominated | |
| International Film Festival of Kerala | 15 December 2017 | Network for the Promotion of Asian Cinema (NETPAC) | Thondimuthalum Driksakshiyum | Won | |
| Kerala Film Critics Association Awards | 21 April 2018 | Best Director | Dileesh Pothan | Won | |
| Kerala Film Critics Association Awards | 21 April 2018 | Best Screenplay | Sajeev Pazhoor | Won | |
| Kerala Film Critics Association Awards | 21 April 2018 | Best Actor | Fahadh Faasil | Won | |
| Kerala State Film Awards | 8 March 2018 | Best Screenplay | Sajeev Pazhoor | Won | |
| Kerala State Film Awards | 8 March 2018 | Best Character Actor | Alencier Ley Lopez | Won | |
| National Film Awards | 3 May 2018 | Best Feature Film in Malayalam | Thondimuthalum Driksakshiyum | Won | |
| National Film Awards | 3 May 2018 | Best Screenplay (Screenplay Writer Original) | Sajeev Pazhoor | Won | |
| National Film Awards | 3 May 2018 | Best Supporting Actor | Fahadh Faasil | Won | |
| South Indian International Movie Awards | 14–15 September 2018 | Best Film – Malayalam | Thondimuthalum Driksakshiyum | Won | |
| South Indian International Movie Awards | 14–15 September 2018 | Best Director – Malayalam | Dileesh Pothan | Nominated | |
| South Indian International Movie Awards | 14–15 September 2018 | Best Actor – Malayalam | Fahadh Faasil | Nominated | |
| South Indian International Movie Awards | 14–15 September 2018 | Critics Choice Best Actor – Malayalam | Fahadh Faasil | Won | |
| South Indian International Movie Awards | 14–15 September 2018 | Best Actress – Malayalam | Nimisha Sajayan | Nominated | |
| South Indian International Movie Awards | 14–15 September 2018 | Best Female Debut – Malayalam | Nimisha Sajayan | Won | |
| South Indian International Movie Awards | 14–15 September 2018 | Best Supporting Actor – Malayalam | Suraj Venjaramoodu | Nominated | |
| South Indian International Movie Awards | 14–15 September 2018 | Best Music Director – Malayalam | Bijibal | Nominated | |
| South Indian International Movie Awards | 14–15 September 2018 | Best Female Playback Singer – Malayalam | Soumya Ramakrishnan ("Kannile Poika") | Nominated | |
| Vanitha Film Awards | 25 February 2018 | Best Director | Dileesh Pothan | Won | |
| Vanitha Film Awards | 25 February 2018 | Best Actor | Fahadh Faasil | Won | |
| Vanitha Film Awards | 25 February 2018 | Best Supporting Actor | Suraj Venjaramoodu | Won | |
| Vanitha Film Awards | 25 February 2018 | Best Newcomer Actress | Nimisha Sajayan | Won | |

== See also ==
- List of Malayalam films of 2017
