= Arun Kumar V. R. =

Indian film producer

Arun Kumar V.R.
- Born: Arun Kumar V.R. 1 March 1975 (age 51)
- Occupations: Film producer distributor exhibitor
- Years active: 2000–present
- Spouse: Nisha
- Children: 2

Arun Kumar V.R. is an Indian film producer, distributor, cinema exhibitor who works in Malayalam film industry. He began his career as executive producer in 2011 with Amal Neerad productions and started career as producer in Malayalam films in 2021. He established the film production house Film roll, which exclusively produces Malayalam films. He is an active member of Malayalam film producers Association.

== Filmography ==
Year	Title	Role
2022	Kuttavum Shikshayum (2021 film)	(producer)
2022	Thuramukham (2022 film), The Harbour	(executive producer)
2018	Varathan	(executive producer)
2017	CIA: Comrade in America	(executive producer)
2014	Iyobinte Pusthakam	(executive producer)
