= Right of recall =

The term right of recall can mean:

- The right of citizens to recall a representative or executive
  - Right to Recall laws in India
- The right of an employee under a collective bargaining agreement to be recalled to employment within a specified period after being laid off
