= Enna Vilai =

2026 film directed by Sajeev Pazhoor

- Theatrical release poster
- Directed by: Sajeev Pazhoor
- Written by: Sajeev Pazhoor
- Produced by: Githesh Viswambharan; Anugopal Venugopalan
- Starring: Karunas; Nimisha Sajayan; Vijayalakshmi Veeramani; Shashaa Shivakumar; Kamalesh Jagan; Heesha
- Cinematography: Alby Antony
- Edited by: Sreejith Sarang
- Music by: Sam C. S.
- Production company: Kalamaya Cineverse
- Distributed by: Romeo Pictures
- Release date: 17 September 2026
- Running time: 123 minutes
- Country: India
- Language: Tamil

Enna Vilai (transl. What is the Price?; also marketed as Enna Vilai: The Price of Dignity) is an 2026 Indian Tamil-language legal drama film written and directed by Sajeev Pazhoor in his directorial debut and produced by Kalamaya Cineverse. The film stars Karunas, Nimisha Sajayan, Vijayalakshmi Veeramani, Shashaa Shivakumar, Kamalesh Jagan and Heesha in lead roles. It follows a fisherman who is wrongfully convicted, and a lawyer who fights for his release.

The film marks Sajeev Pazhoor's Tamil directorial debut. The project was announced with Karunas and Nimisha Sajayan in the lead roles, with the film subsequently entering production. The film has music and background score by Sam C. S., cinematography handled by Alby Antony and editing by Sreejith Sarang.

Enna Vilai was released in theatres on 17 September 2026.

== Plot ==
In Rameswaram, Thavasimuthu "Thavasi" is a humble fisherman who sustains his family by collecting coins tossed into the sea by pilgrims. One day Thavasi discovers a valuable gold pendant on the seabed. Driven by basic honesty, he attempts to hand the ornament over to the local authorities. Instead, a corrupt policeman pockets a precious stone from the pendant and frames Thavasi connecting him to a stolen jewelry case in recent times from another state. An idealistic lawyer Kanchana takes up defense and in courtroom trial it was found by the defense lawyer that the person who had lodged the complaint in Bihar had a different piece of jewelry, the prosecutor diverts the case to temple theft. A local newspaper covers the case initially and then bigger newspapers and media houses cover the story, as to whom does the antique jewel belong. Getting bail was difficult for the accused and then a celebrity couple comes forward with the statement that it was their jewel and they had thrown in Rameswaram beach, thereby bringing an end to the case. But the defense lawyer pleads that the fisherman’s dignity has got affected through the prosecution and the state should publish an apology in leading newspapers rather than monetary compensation for which the state chief minister was reluctant and then accepts the condition.

== Cast ==
- Karunas as Thavasimuthu "Thavasi"
- Nimisha Sajayan as Advocate Kanchana
- Vijayalakshmi Veeramani as Pallama, Thavasi's wife
- Shashaa Shivakumar as Manimegalai, Thavasi's sister and Pandi's love interest
- Kamalesh Jagan as Bharathi, Thavasi's son
- Heesha as Tamizhazhagi, Thavasi's daughter
- Chethan Cheenu
- Mohan Raman as Constable Varadharajan
- Y. Gee. Mahendra as Advocate General
- Kavithalayaa Krishnan as Public Prosecutor
- Swaminathan as Advocate
- TSR Srinivasan as Judge
- Nizhalgal Ravi as Judge
- Poornima Bhagyaraj as Judge
- Viviya Santh
- Praveena
- JS Kavi as Kanchana's assistant
- Pasanga Pandi as Pandi, Manimegalai's love interest
- Deepa Shankar
- Supergood Subramani
- Rajendran as Temple Thief
- Kottachi as Konthandam
- Nirosha
- Muniswaran
- Pasupathi Raj
- S. R. Kothandan
- Prabhu as CM of Tamilnadu

== Production ==
=== Development ===
The film was announced as Enna Vilai, marking the directorial debut of writer Sajeev Pazhoor. It was conceived as a family drama with elements of a crime thriller and was planned as a bilingual project made simultaneously in Tamil and Malayalam. Githesh Viswambharan and Anugopal Venugopalan produced the film under the banner of Kalamaya Cineverse. Alby Antony was announced as the cinematographer, while Sam C. S. composed the music and Sreejith Sarang handled the editing.

=== Casting ===
Nimisha Sajayan was cast as the female lead, marking her reunion with Sajeev Pazhoor, who had written the screenplay for Thondimuthalum Driksakshiyum. Karunas was also cast in a lead role. The supporting cast includes Nizhalgal Ravi, Praveena, Y. Gee. Mahendra, Kamalesh Jagan, Pasanga Pandi, Viviya Santh, Chethan Cheenu, Kavithalayaa Krishnan, Swaminathan, Pasupathi Raj, Supergood Subramani, Deepa Shankar, Kottachi and others.

=== Filming ===
The first schedule of filming was completed in Rameshwaram, Tamil Nadu. The remaining portions were planned to be filmed at Ramoji Film City in Hyderabad and Gokulam Studios in Chennai by the end of August 2024. A major portion of the film was subsequently shot in Paalam village in Dhanushkodi, where the makers later returned to launch the film's first look with the participation of the local villagers.

== Music ==
Enna Vilai

Soundtrack album by Sam C. S.
- Released: 2 September 2026
- Recorded: 2024–2025
- Genre: Feature film soundtrack
- Language: Tamil
- Label: G. V. Prakash Kumar
- Producer: Sam C. S.

Sam C. S. chronology
Sardar 2 (2026)	Enna Vilai (2026)	The Vvaan: Force of the Forrest (2026)

Singles from Enna Vilai
- 1. "Kadalaadum Seemayile" Released: 2 September 2026; 2. "Vaan Meeru" Released: 13 September 2026; 3. "Maanarthiku Enna Vilai" Released: 23 September 2026 (After the film's release)

The music and background score is composed by Sam C. S., in his maiden collaboration with Karunas and Sajeev Pazhoor. The audio rights were acquired by G. V. Prakash Kumar's label. The first single titled "Kadalaadum Seemayile" was released on 2 September 2026. The second single titled "Vaan Meeru" was released on 13 September 2026. The last single "Maanarthiku Enna Vilai" was released on 23 September 2026, after the film's release.

Track listing
No.	Title	Lyrics	Singer(s)	Length
1.	"Kadalaadum Seemayile"	Karthik Netha	Anthony Daasan	4:01
2.	"Vaan Meeru"	Karthik Netha	Shivam	4:04
3.	"Maanarthiku Enna Vilai"	Ilango Krishnan	Deepak Blue	3:32

== Release ==
=== Premiere ===
Enna Vilai was selected for screening at the Kaia International Film Festival in Turkey in August 2026, ahead of its theatrical release. The film had previously received recognition at the Dadasaheb Phalke International Film Festival, where it won the award for Best Screenplay.

=== Theatrical ===
Enna Vilai was released in theatres on 17 September 2026. The film received a U/A certificate (parental guidance) from the censor board. Sajeev Pazhoor objected to this move as he felt the film did not include objectionable content and unsuccessfully demanded a U certificate (unrestricted) instead.

=== Distribution ===
Enna Vilai was distributed by Romeo Pictures in Tamil Nadu and Karnataka. The distribution rights were acquired by Wayfarer Films. The North India distribution rights were acquired by SP Cinemas.

=== Home media ===
The film will begin streaming on Netflix from 15 October 2026 In Tamil, Telugu, Malayalam, Kannada, Hindi.

== Reception ==
Abhinav Subramanian of The Times of India described the film as one that effectively makes its point while knowing when to conclude. Vishal Menon of The Hollywood Reporter India found the drama initially promising but criticised the film for overstaying its welcome. Avinash Ramachandran of The New Indian Express described the film as a compelling question presented through a meandering legal drama, highlighting the difference between its central idea and its execution. News Today similarly characterised the film as a compelling legal drama.

== Accolades ==
Enna Vilai received recognition at several film festivals prior to and around its theatrical release. The film won the Best Feature Film award at the Mannheim Arts and Film Festival in Germany, while Sajeev Pazhoor received the Best Indian Debut Director award at the Indian Independent Film Festival in Kolkata. The film also received the Best Screenplay award at the Dadasaheb Phalke International Film Festival.

Year	Award / Festival	Category	Recipient	Result
2026	Mannheim Arts and Film Festival	Best Feature Film	Enna Vilai	Won
2026	Indian Independent Film Festival, Kolkata	Best Indian Debut Director	Sajeev Pazhoor	Won
2026	Dadasaheb Phalke International Film Festival	Best Screenplay	Sajeev Pazhoor	Won
