= One (2021 film) =

2021 film directed by Santhosh Viswanath

- Theatrical release poster
- Directed by: Santhosh Viswanath
- Written by: Bobby–Sanjay
- Produced by: Sreelakshmi R
- Starring: Mammootty; Mathew Thomas; Murali Gopy; Siddique; Joju George; Ishaani Krishna; Gayatri Arun; Nimisha Sajayan
- Cinematography: Vaidy Somasundaram
- Edited by: Nishadh Yusuf
- Music by: Gopi Sundar
- Production company: Ichais Productions
- Distributed by: Central Pictures
- Release date: 26 March 2021 (India)
- Running time: 150 minutes
- Country: India
- Language: Malayalam

One is a 2021 Indian Malayalam-language political drama film directed by Santhosh Vishwanath and written by Bobby–Sanjay. The film stars Mammootty in the lead role, alongside an ensemble cast including Mathew Thomas, Murali Gopy, Siddique, Joju George, Ishaani Krishna, Gayatri Arun, Nimisha Sajayan, Madhu, Balachandra Menon, Ranjith, Shankar Ramakrishnan, Salim Kumar, Jayakrishnan, Jagadish, Binu Pappu, Jayan Cherthala, Sudev Nair, Krishna Kumar and Vivek Gopan.

== Plot ==
Kadakkal Chandran is the Chief Minister of Kerala who advocates for the Right to Recall (India) tool meant to target corrupt ministers and corrupt MLAs.

Affected by the high handedness of police protecting the CM and the challenges faced by commoners when people of power are traveling, Sanal posts an angry anonymous Facebook post lamenting the situation, which goes viral. Opposition parties make this, into a major political issue leading up to a general strike. There is a serious hunt for Sanal by the government and police. The local MLA and attorney are afraid to take up his case. He is apprehended as he tries to flee to Bengaluru. Later the CM declares that he wanted to meet Sanal in person. Though scared, he goes to the official residence of the Chief Minister. On meeting him, Sanal understands that the CM is a good leader and a wonderful human being after the CM reveals the truth behind Sanal's Facebook post. After initial friction, Sanal gets more close to the CM and they become close friends. The CM gives him an appointment and his life takes a new turn.

In the end, Kadakkal Chandran is re-elected as the Chief Minister.

== Cast ==
- Mammootty as Kadakkal Chandran, Chief Minister of Kerala
- Mathew Thomas as Sanal Das
- Joju George as Babychan, Party Secretary
- Murali Gopy as Marampalli Jayanandhan, Leader of Opposition
- Siddique as K.C. Jayakumar, Speaker of the Kerala Legislative Assembly
- Ishaani Krishna as Ramya, Sanal's friend
- Gayatri Arun as Seena Das, Sanal's sister
- Nimisha Sajayan as Lathika Satheesh, Chandran's sister
- Madhu as Vasudeva Panicker, Retd. Professor
- Balachandra Menon as Dr. Sreekar Varma
- Ranjith as Vijaya Mohan, Advocate General of Kerala
- Shankar Ramakrishnan as Shamsudeen IAS, Chief Secretary of Kerala
- Binu Pappu as Chandran's gunman
- Mamukkoya as Ibrahim, Chandran's cook
- Salim Kumar as Dassappan, Seena's and Sanal's father
- Jagadish as P. Sugunan, MLA opposition
- Prem Kumar as P. Madhu, MLA opposition
- Rizabawa as R. Bhaskaran, MLA opposition
- Jayan Cherthala as Vishwambharan, Minister for Culture
- Sudev Nair as MP Dinesh Rajan
- Sudheer Karamana as T.M Musaliyar, Minister for Industries
- Alencier Ley Lopez as Kuriakose, Minister for Revenue
- Krishnakumar as DGP Alex Thomas IPS, Vigilance Director
- Mukundan as MLA Kariyavattom Sreekumar
- Jayakrishnan as MLA Tom Mukkadan
- Archana Manoj as MLA Geetha Hariprasad
- Sreeja Das as Celine, MLA Opposition
- Yadhu Krishnan as DYSP Rajesh Menon
- Vivek Gopan as Roshan Alex, Chandran's private secretary
- Shiju as Satheesh Manohar, Lathika's husband
- Meghanathan as K. Ramachandran, Minister for Excise
- Suresh Krishna as MLA Nilamel Rajan
- Balaji Sarma as MLA Chittar Gopalakrishnan
- V.K Baiju as MLA Anil Thomas
- Sadiq as Sameer Kallayi, MLA opposition
- P. Balachandran as Attingal Madhusoodhanan, MLA opposition
- Prasanth Alexander as Satheeshan, MLA opposition
- Premjith Lal as T.K Santhosh, MLA opposition
- Nandu as Councillor Noorudheen
- Dinesh Panicker as SP Ananthan IPS
- Nishanth Sagar as CI Shine Thomas
- Abu Salim as SI Jayakrishnan
- Reshmi Boban as Indira, Dasappan's wife
- Vettukili Prakash as Adv. Padmanabhan
- Subbalakshmi as Ramya's grandmother
- Azees Nedumangad as Binu, Auto rickshaw driver
- Sanjay Padiyoor as Chandran's second gunman
- Riyaz Narmakala as Rajagopal
- Nazeer Latheef as Prof. George Korah
- Anubha George as District Collector, Trivandrum
- K.Laljy as Trivandrum City Police Commissioner
- Kalabhavan Haneef as Thomas, security officer
- Anoop C Mammen as Security officer
- Aaryan Krishna Menon as Jaimon
- Nazmal Ali Ahammed as Muneer, Chandran's driver
- Viaan Mangalassery as Felix
- Tarun Dhanrajgir as Governor of Kerala
- Dr. Arun Kumar as 24 News Reader
- Poojappura Radhakrishnan as Gopu, hair dresser
- Ashraf Pezhumoodu
- Pooja Mohanraj as Civil Police Officer

== Production ==
Principal photography began in October 2019.

The launch (muhurat) ceremony was held while the film was still in pre-production, and was attended by Joju George, Ranjith, Shankar Ramakrishnan, Salim Kumar and Ramesh Pisharody. Mammootty joined the film after completing work on Shylock.

== Music ==
Gopi Sundar is the music director of the movie. The film has one song, "Janamanssin", a political anthem, sung by Shankar Mahadevan. Its lyrics were written by Rafeeq Ahamed.

== Release ==
=== Theatrical ===
The film was originally scheduled to be released on 22 May 2020, but was postponed due to the COVID-19 pandemic. It was released on 26 March 2021.

=== Home media ===
Following the theatrical release, the film was released on 27 April 2021 on Netflix.

== Reception ==
=== Critical response ===
The film received positive reviews from critics.

Sify gave it a rating of 4.5 stars out of 5 and wrote, "A relevant political drama ". Indian Express gave it a rating of 3.5 stars out of 5 and wrote, "Mammootty’s political drama is pleasant despite its problems". Times of India gave it a rating of 3 stars out if 5 and wrote, "The portrait of a too-good-to-be-true CM ". Baradwaj Rangan of Film Companion South wrote "The film’s problem is in this utter predictability. The chief minister is so good, so pure and selfless that he becomes a big bore. It’s easier to portray Ravana on screen than Rama."
