= Heaven (2022 film) =

- Poster
- Directed by: Unni Govindraj
- Written by: P. S. Subramanian; Unni Govindraj
- Produced by: A. D. Sreekumar; Rema Sreekumar; K. Krishnan; T. R. Raghuraj
- Starring: Suraj Venjaramoodu
- Cinematography: Vinod Illampally
- Edited by: Toby John
- Music by: Gopi Sundar
- Production company: Cut 2 Create Pictures
- Distributed by: Movies Nest Release
- Release date: 17 July 2022
- Country: India
- Language: Malayalam

Heaven is a 2022 Indian Malayalam-language crime thriller film co-written and directed by Unni Govindraj (in his directorial debut). The film stars Suraj Venjaramoodu and Deepak Parambol, with Alencier Ley Lopez, Sudev Nair and Sudheesh in important roles. The film's music was composed by Gopi Sundar. Heaven was released theatrically on 17 July 2022.

== Plot ==
On a camping trip, a group of NCC cadets finds a decomposed body in the woods. DYSP Bijoy Kuruvilla, the investigating officer finds that the murderer is a CI named Peter Kurishinkal and arrests him. Peter is a widowed brain-over-brawn cop, who lives with his mother Mariyam and son Sebin. The cops are investigating a mass murder of Mathew's family, where Peter discovers that Sebin is also murdered. DYSP Kishore finds that a migrant worker, who used to work at their home has absconded and is the prime suspect. Peter notices that the tapes tied on Mathew's hands are tied anti-clockwise, which makes him deduce that a left-handed person should have done the crime. The migrant worker was right-handed. Peter regains his job as he wants to find the perpetrators, who murdered Sebin. Later he finds the migrant worker's body from the same house buried under the tiles. DYSP Kishore finds blood stains on the floor and looks for patients, who received treatment on that day for similar injuries and arrests Stephen. Peter finds that Stephen received money for confessing to the crime and learns about his advocate.

While following the advocate, Peter learns that Kishore is also involved in the crime, and he interrogates Kishore. Kishore tells Peter that the murders were done in vengeance by Fabian John. Fabian was smuggling diamonds via air which Mathews found out and informed the customs. Fabian's wife Ancy, who is pregnant, was the carrier, due to which she loses her child and commits suicide. Fabian learns about Mathew and arrives at his house named Heaven with Stephen and Ubaid to kill him. While killing Mathew's family, Sebin happens to be at the spot and Fabian had to kill him too. In revenge, Peter digs out Ancy's grave and Fabian arrives at Heaven to kill Peter. A fight ensues, where Peter overpowers and kills Fabian by injecting air into his veins, where he keeps the body in a morgue for a while and instructs an ambulance driver Philip to wear his clothes and drop the body in the woods, while Peter leaves to Dubai and videotapes him attending a birthday function. During the court trial, Peter could prove that he was in Dubai during the time the murder occurred as per post-mortem report. Due to this, Peter is released from custody.

== Cast ==
- Suraj Venjaramoodu as CI Peter Kurishingal
- Alencier Ley Lopez as ASI Sukumara Pillai
- Deepak Parambol as Fabian John
- Sudheesh as Philip
- Sudev Nair as DYSP Bijoy Kuruvilla
- Vinaya Prasad as Mariyam Kurishingal, Peter's mother
- Nimisha Sajayan as Defence Councillor (Cameo)
- Sminu Sijo as CPO Binimol
- Abhija Sivakala as SP Revathi Subramaniam IPS
- Shyam Mohan as CPO Sumesh Chandran
- Padmaraj Ratheesh as DYSP Kishore
- Jaffar Idukki as Stephen
- Joy Mathew as Dr. Narayana Swami (Police Surgeon)
- Adwaith as Sebin Kurushingal
- Gopalakrishnan as Mathews
- Devananda as Teena
- Sruthy Jayan as Ancy, Fabian's wife
- Sreeja Das as ASI Sherin
- Devi Ajith as Public Prosecutor
- Resmi Boban as School Principal
- Manju Pathrose as Stephen's wife
- Meera Nair as Nirmala, a forensic surgeon
- Chembil Ashokan as Juvenile Home Warden
- Boban Samuel as Adv. Damodhara Shenoy
- Jordy Poonjar as Vakkachan (Ward Member)
- Sohan Seenulal as Gireesh
- Santhosh Lakshman as Balvindar
- Asha Aravind as Lalitha (Forensic officer)
- Devi Menon

== Release ==
Heaven was released in theaters on 17 July 2022 and was subsequently released on Disney+ Hotstar on 19 August 2022. The Hindi dubbed version is available on Hulu.

=== Reception ===
Avinash Ramachandran of Cinema Express wrote that "Heaven is a decent film that could have been either better or worse, and it is to the credit of the team that it stays safely on the better side of things". Sanjith Sidhardhan of OTT Play gave the film a rating of two-and-a-half out of five stars and opined that "While the first half is interesting with just enough twists and red herrings, the filmmaker loses the grip in the second half by piecing together a puzzle that doesn't quite fit into how the film was progressing".
