= Njan Steve Lopez =

- Poster of the film Njan Steve Lopez
- Directed by: Rajeev Ravi
- Screenplay by: Rajesh Ravi; Santhosh Echikkanam; Geethu Mohandas; B Ajith Kumar
- Story by: Rajeev Ravi
- Produced by: Madhu Neelakandan; Alan McAlex; Madhukar R. Musle
- Starring: Farhaan Faasil; Ahaana Krishna
- Cinematography: Pappu
- Edited by: B. Ajithkumar
- Music by: Songs: Shahabaz Aman; Background score: Chandran Veyattummal; Govind Vasantha
- Production companies: Collective Phase One; Jar Pictures; M. R Film Works
- Distributed by: E4 Entertainment
- Release date: 8 August 2014
- Running time: 116 minutes
- Country: India
- Language: Malayalam

Njan Steve Lopez (titled in English as I Am Steve Lopez) is a 2014 Indian Malayalam-language thriller drama film, directed by Rajeev Ravi. The production is also supported by Jar Pictures, M.R. Filmworks and Media Mill. The film is set in Thiruvananthapuram and stars Farhaan Faasil and Ahaana Krishna in lead roles. It was their debut movie as hero and heroine.

== Plot ==
Steve is a college kid whose major concern in life is how to tell his childhood friend Anjali that he loves her. He has an iPhone, is on WhatsApp all the time, goes out drinking with his friends and generally lives a carefree life made all the more secure by the fact that Steve's father George is a Deputy Superintendent of Police in Thiruvananthapuram.

This idyll is smashed when one day, Steve witnesses a stranger being attacked by men with scythes. Steve isn't able to stop them, but when the attackers leave their victim for dead, Steve takes the injured man to the hospital.

It's here that he realizes there is more than what meets the eye. The man he helped is from a criminal gang and it's evident that George is very unhappy that his son has got mixed up in all this.

Steve's misgivings intensify when he's called to the police station to identify the attackers in a lineup and none of the men he'd seen are in that lineup.

On his way back from the police station, Steve spots one of the scythe-wielding men in a car and decides to follow him. The man whom Steve is following, Hari, seems to be unaware of the college kid tailing him, but of course, that's not really the case. Two of Hari's men knock out Steve. When he comes to his senses, Steve finds himself bound and gagged in a room that overlooks Hari's home. Things become murkier when Hari says he's going to let Steve go and Steve realizes that Hari knows his father.

All Steve wants to do is the right and humane thing by the people he encounters, but his acts of kindness just serve to terribly muddle up the situation he is in. Steve realises George and the police force are somehow involved with the gangs and are playing sides, possibly to maintain a peaceful status quo. However, no matter how many times Steve asks, George won't explain to his son precisely how the police are handling the situations.

Inevitably, Steve realises that the bad guys have human sides and the police have terrible secrets, but no one has answers to the questions that Steve has. The more he investigates this case in which he has unwittingly become a critical pawn, the more dangerous things turn for him. Aside from Steve, no one seems blameless and yet, he is the one who seems to be suffering the most. The film ends with Steve riding his motorcycle down a street with an empty expression on his face, as another motorcycle approaches from behind and the men riding it swing a scythe at Steve's back. The frame freezes just before the scythe connects, leaving Steve's final fate ambiguous.

== Cast ==
- Farhaan Faasil as Steve Lopez
- Ahaana Krishna as Anjali
- Alencier Ley Lopez as DSP George Lopez IPS
- Sujith Shankar as Hari
- Anil Nedumangad as Freddie Lopez
- Abhija Sivakala as Anjali (Hari's wife)
- James Elia as Mohanan
- Mini K. S. as Steve's mother
- Chinnu Kuruvila as Steve's sister
- Dr. Ambikasuthan as Steve's grandfather
- Vinayakan as Pratapan
- Anoop Mohandas as Steve Lopez's friend

== Production ==
The production of the film began on 25 December 2013 in Thiruvananthapuram. Director Rajeev Ravi took a recce in Puthenthope to learn more about the place. Ravi compared his film with Udaan (2010) and said that "this is a coming-of-RAGE film where characters grow up only to turn into angry young men". According to the director, the film doesn't fall into a single genre.

== Music ==
Njan Steve Lopez

Film score by Shahabaz Aman, Chandran Veyattummal
- Released: 13 July 2014
- Genre: Feature film soundtrack
- Length: 19:16
- Label: My Studio
- Producers: Shahabaz Aman, Chandran Veyattummal

The film score was composed by Chandran Veyattummal and Govind Vasantha. The songs were composed by Shahabaz Aman and were released on 13 July 2014 in A. J. Hall in Kochi. Chandran Veyattummal also composed the song "Pokaruthen Makane" for the film, which is extracted from the oral text of Iravikutti Pilla Poru. In an audio review, a critic from The Times of India wrote, "The music of the film doesn't stick to one style or genre, neither does it adhere to the current trends. The result is a set of fresh and listenable tracks, each of which has something new to offer". The song "Theruvukal Nee" became popular on social media.

Track listing
| No. | Title | Lyrics | Singer(s) | Length |
|---|---|---|---|---|
| 1. | "Theruvukal Nee" | Anwar Ali | Siddharth Menon | 5:14 |
| 2. | "Muthu Penne" | Traditional | Jassie Gift | 2:48 |
| 3. | "Pokaruthen Makane" | From the oral text of Iravikutti Pilla Poru (Research: Anwar Ali) | Jensy Gregory | 3:42 |
| 4. | "Chirakukal Njan" | Anwar Ali | Parvathy Jayadevan | 4:23 |
| 5. | "Oorake Kalapila" | Anwar Ali, Anoop Mohandas, Rahul Madhusudan | Anwar Ali, Anoop Mohandas, Ramesh Ram, Vishnu Dethan, Ben Sam Jones | 3:49 |
| Total length: | | | | 19:16 |

== Online release ==
The movie was released online on Reelmonk to a worldwide audience on 20 July 2015. However, the day of the online release the movie suffered from piracy attacks and was uploaded to torrent sites. The online release partner, Reelmonk, was, however, able to track the uploader within 12 minutes and has initiated criminal proceedings against the pirate.

== Reception ==
The film was well received by critics. Baradwaj Rangan of The Hindu wrote, "the fascinating and deeply atmospheric Njan Steve Lopez, follows pretty much the same trajectory [as Annayum Rasoolum]. Young man. Rebuff. Love. Spanner-throwing fate. Tangential involvement with criminals. It’s all there – but in a different form". Aswin J Kumar of The Times of India rated the film 3.5/5 stars and wrote, "Njan Steve Lopez is a film that will not disappoint even those who look for vigour and colour. It has warmth that glows every now and then and it is hard to resist". Deepanjana Pal of Firstpost wrote, "This is not a movie experience that will leave you feeling happy, but Njan Steve Lopez does make you wonder about the choices we make and those that are made for us. For that alone, it’s worth a watch". Nandini Ramnath of Mint wrote, "Njan Steve Lopez suggests that sometimes, it’s better to quaff your way towards a stupor rather than swallow the hard facts of life in present-day Malayali society". Shubha Shetty-Saha of Mid-Day rated the film 3/5 stars and wrote, "Watch it as it narrates an intriguing story aided by good performances".

The lack of commercialization made it a failure in the box office. It had since gone through a series of festival circuits gaining more critical acclaim. Finding audience online, now the film has a cult following and is considered Rajeev Ravi's best work among his five films.
