= Jiju Asokan =

Indian film director and scriptwriter

- Born: Jiju Asokan; 18 May 1977 (age 49); Padiyur, Thrissur, India
- Other name: Jiju E.A
- Occupations: Film director, Scriptwriter
- Years active: 2007–present
- Spouse: Subitha Jiju
- Children: Pavan E.J
- Parent(s): Asokan E.k; Valsala

Jiju Asokan (born May 18, 1977) is an Indian film director and Scriptwriter best known for his work in Malayalam cinema.

== Personal life ==
Jiju Asokan was born in Padiyur, Kerala with Asokan E.k and Valsala Asokan as his parents. Jiju Asokan completed his education at the SNVLP School, Padiyur and HDPHSS Edathirinji, and earned a degree from Christ College, Irinjalakuda and St. Theresa's kottakkal.

== Career ==
Jiju Asokan started his writing career writing and publishing many short stories in Mathrubhumi "Balapangthi". He made his debut as scriptwriter of the film Oridathoru Puzhayundu which won the Kerala State Film Award in 2007. His next project was Malayalam film Shakespeare M.A. Malayalam.

He was worked as an assistant director with Malayalam film director Jijo Appachan and made his debut as a director with the film Last Bench, which participated in the film marketing workshop of 10th international film festival of kerala. Jiju's second directorial venture Urumbukal Urangarilla was released in 2015. His third movie Premasoothram (2018) released in May 2018.

== Filmography ==
Year	Film	Credited as			
Year	Film	Director	Producer	Story	Screenwriter
2007	Oridathoru Puzhayundu			Yes	Yes
2008	Shakespeare M.A. Malayalam			Yes	Yes
2012	Last Bench	Yes		Yes	Yes
2015	Urumbukal Urangarilla	Yes		Yes	Yes
2018	Premasoothram	Yes		Yes	Yes
