= Puthenthope =

- Village
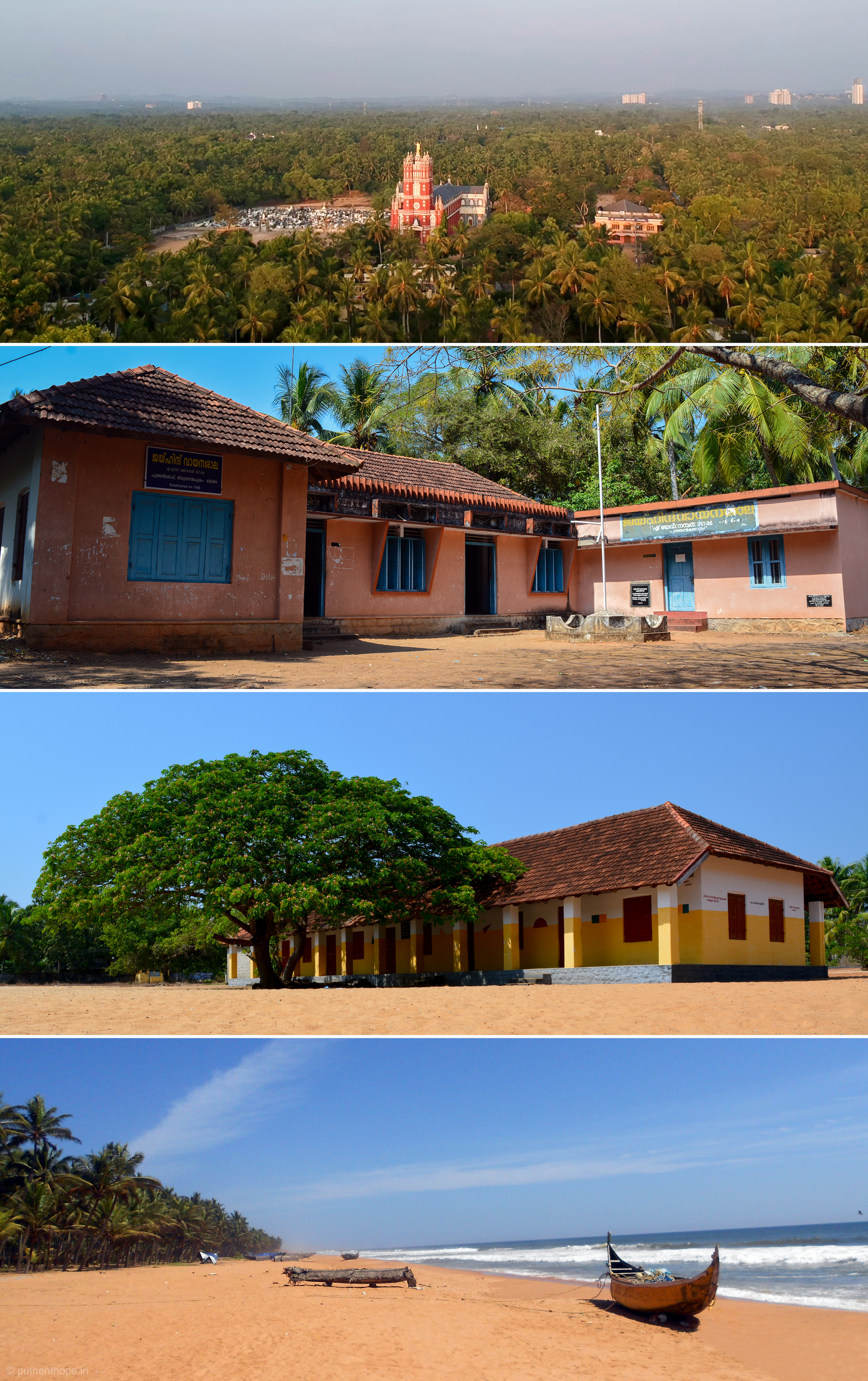
- from top : Puthenthope, Jaihind Vayanasala, St Ignatius UP School, Puthenthope Beach

- Location in Kerala Location in India
- Coordinates: 8°34′23″N 76°50′12″E
- Country: India
- State: Kerala
- District: Thiruvananthapuram

Government
  - Body: Gram panchayat

Languages
  - Official: Malayalam, English
- Time zone: UTC+5:30 (IST)
- PIN: 695586 -West of parvathy puthanar. 695301 -East Of parvathy puthanar
- Vehicle registration: KL-22
- Nearest city: Thiruvananthapuram
- Lok Sabha constituency: Attingal
- Climate: Hot and Humid (Köppen)

Puthenthope (Puthen - New, Thope - Orchard) is a coastal village in Thiruvananthapuram district in Kerala, India, and situated 19 km (12 mi) northwest of city centre, 16 km from Thiruvananthapuram International Airport. The village is mostly covered with coconut palms and cashew trees. Its western side edges the Arabian Sea, while the east is separated by Parvathi Puthanar, a manmade canal completed during the time of Regent Sethu Lakshmi Bhai of Travancore Kingdom. Access to National Highway (NH 66) and a railway station is as short as 2 km (1.2 mi) and the VSSC of the Indian Space Research Organisation is close by. There are two man made hills — one on the south (Thekkekkunnu)and the other on the north (Vadakkekkunnu), which are believed to have been made during the time of Portuguese.India's first DNA-Barcoding Centre, set up at bio-informatic centre for Tropical Garden and Research institute at Puthenthope. Famous Malayalam Cine Artist Alencier Ley Lopez hails from Puthenthope.

== History ==
There is little written historical record of Puthenthope's development but a strong oral tradition.

In the 16th century, the Dutch were looking for a strategic point to place their cannons, aiming at the Dutch ship movements in the Arabian Sea. They found a suitable place with tall coconut palms on the coastal area and dense forest throughout the inland. If they could build hills in between and place the cannons there, the ships could not see it but the people in the land could easily monitor. So to build the hills, the Dutch brought a group of people from Ambalappuzha, a place in the present Alappuzha district. They made the hills for the cannons to be placed. The Kusavans who came from Amplapuzha stayed back and continued with their occupation of pot making. The occupation of pot making was not suitable for many reasons–the unavailability of clay, the long walk through the forest to the nearest market, presence of notorious thieves on the forest way etc. They turned to another profitable occupation–fishing.

A journey through the coastal lines of Thiruvananthapuram reveals that there are no historical landmark sites as old as the Puthenthope mounds. The Portuguese influence can also be seen in the language spoken here. However, the Ambalapuzha link remained a mystery till the excavation of sand mounds in the late 1970s. During excavations, huge quantities of earthenware, believed to be used by the then people were discovered.

St. Francis Xavier came to India in the early 16th century and walked through the western coast of India preaching Christianity and converting people to Christianity. There is a strong assumption that he placed a cross near Njaramukham (the archaic name of Puthenthope) and prayed (present Pallimukku area). There is another belief that St. Francis heard about the death of his teacher St. Ignatius Loyola while he was near Njanramukham and so he placed the cross in his name.

There is a common belief that, some women from the family of the famous Ettuveettil Pillai, the Kazhakuttam Pillai, was given to the Mukkuvas of the area, after he being executed by Marthanda Varma. There are conflicting references but the most reliable historical reference points that these ladies from the eight families (ettu veedu) were gathered together and given to the mukkuvas on the northern border of Travancore kingdom, far away from the capital – a coastal area in the present Kayamkulam Taluk.

Fishing, once, might have been a profitable venture. The two pandakashalas, built close to the seashore, one near the Church and the other at Njaramugham, for processing and storing fish, have disappeared, but their remains account for the then flourishing fish trade.

During the heyday, people had established trade relations with Ceylon. The British East India Company had started its industrial expansions in Malaya and turning Singapore into a flourishing free port by the dawn of the 19th century and there was a big flow of human resources from China and India to these areas. Many people from Puthenthope had traveled to British Malaya before and after the Second World War. It might have been from there that some Puthenthopians moved on to England, after the independence of these countries in 1957. British must have allowed some of their civil servants to accompany them on their withdrawal (a possible reason).

== Occupation ==
- Puthenthope being a coastal village, the traditional occupation is fishing.
- Coconut farming is a means of additional income.
- A large population work in the Middle East sheikhdoms.

== Religion ==
=== Latin Catholic ===
Christian Catholic community. Parish of Puthenthope belongs to the Latin Archdiocese of Trivandrum. The center of all the religious, social and political activities is the Church, St. Ignatius Church.

St Ignatius Church Puthenthope

St Ignatius Church Puthenthope is the center of all religious and social activities. The present church was built in 1989. The foundation stone was blessed by Pope John Paul II during his visit to India in 1986. The church is the replica of St.Joseph's Cathedral, Palayam. A grotto of Mary is also built in front of the church and the statue of Mary in the grotto was brought from Lourdes by Gertrude Fernandez, a native of Puthenthope. A parochial house, which shows the typical architecture of Kerala is also situated nearby the church. St. Ignatius Parish community hall is another building situated along with the church in the junction of Puthenthope.

- St. Vincent de Paul society
- Kerala Catholic Youth Movement(K C Y M)
- Jesus Youth
- Legion of Mary

=== Islam ===
The Puthenthope Muslim Jamath is situated east side of Puthenthope and near to Puthenthope community health centre.

== Institutions ==
=== Library ===
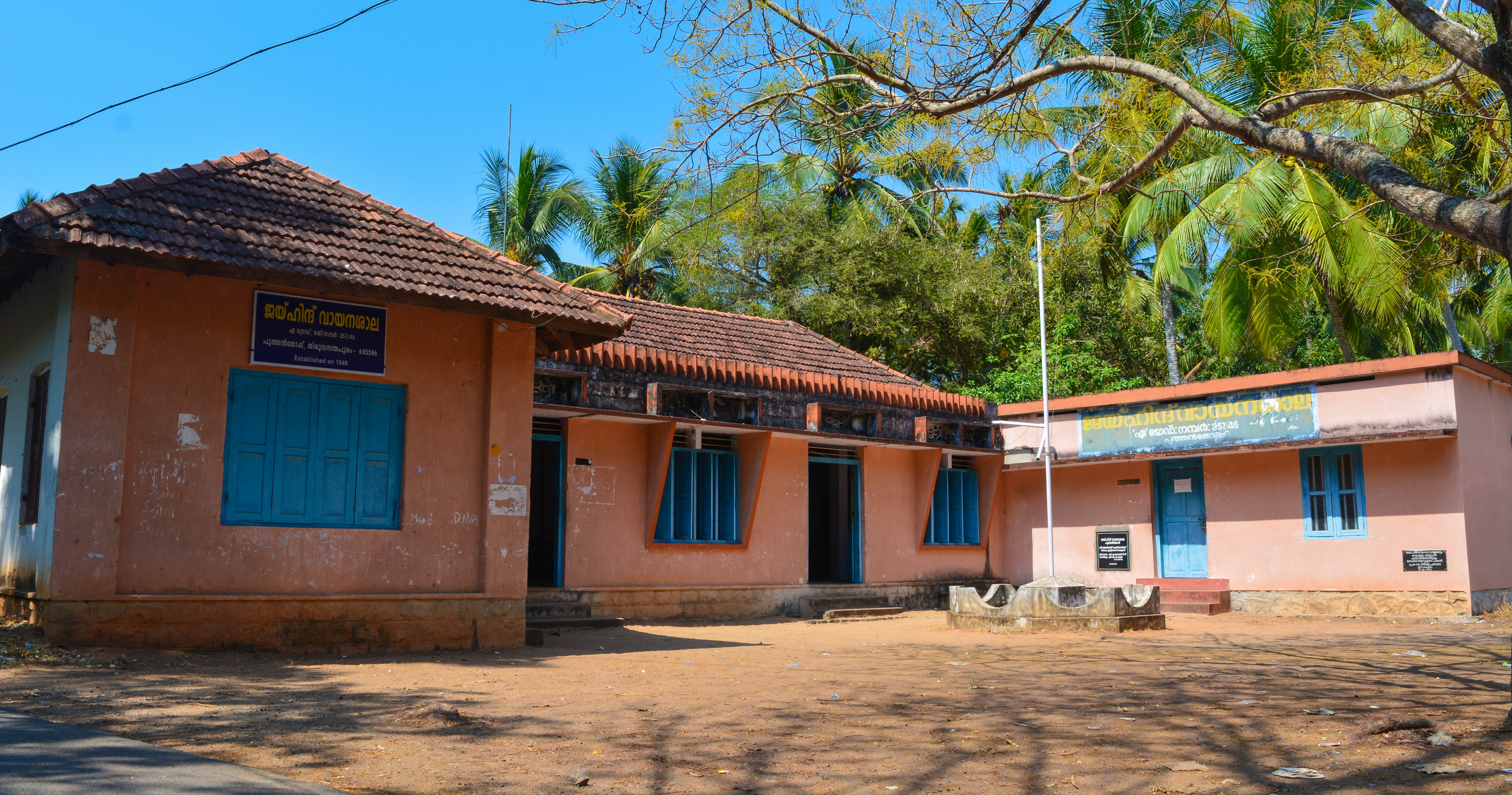
Jaihind Vayanasala

Jaihind Vayanasala was Founded in 1946, at the time of the non-violent independence movement in India. The name says it all. Jai- Victory, Hind - India. Proudly remains as the cultural center of Puthenthope.

=== Schools ===
- Stella Mary's Convent and Nursery School(Bethany Sisters)
- Government Lower Primary School, Puthenthope
- St.Ignatius Upper Primary School, Puthenthope (Roman Catholic Management)

=== Hospitals ===
- Government Primary Health Center, Puthenthope
- Palliative Care Center, Stella Maris Convent, Puthenthope

=== Banks ===
- Indian Bank, Puthenthope
- Puthenthope Agricultural Improvement Co-Op Society (PAICS)

=== Offices ===
- Matsya Bhavan, Puthenthope (Fisheries Office)
- Saraswathy Thangavelu Tropical Botanical Garden and Research Institute, Puthenthope
- India Post, Puthenthope
- Seaboy Fisheries Private Limited, Puthenthope

=== Resorts ===
- Wild Palms on Sea
- The Linta's Golden Beach Ayurvedic Resort
- Palmleaves Beach Resort
- Beach House

== Accessibility ==
Puthenthope is 3 km towards west from National Highway 66(Kaniyapuram) by road and 2.5 km from Kaniyapuram railway station. It is 16 km away from Thiruvananthapuram International Airport.

== Events and celebrations ==
- Christmas
- Christmas Aquatic sports in the Beach
- Easter
- Parish Feast (Feast of St. Ignatious) - July August
- Parish Feast (Feast of Mama Mary offering Baby Jesus in the Church) - February
- Procession along the boundaries of Parish during February Parish feast
- Jaihind Cup

== Attractions ==
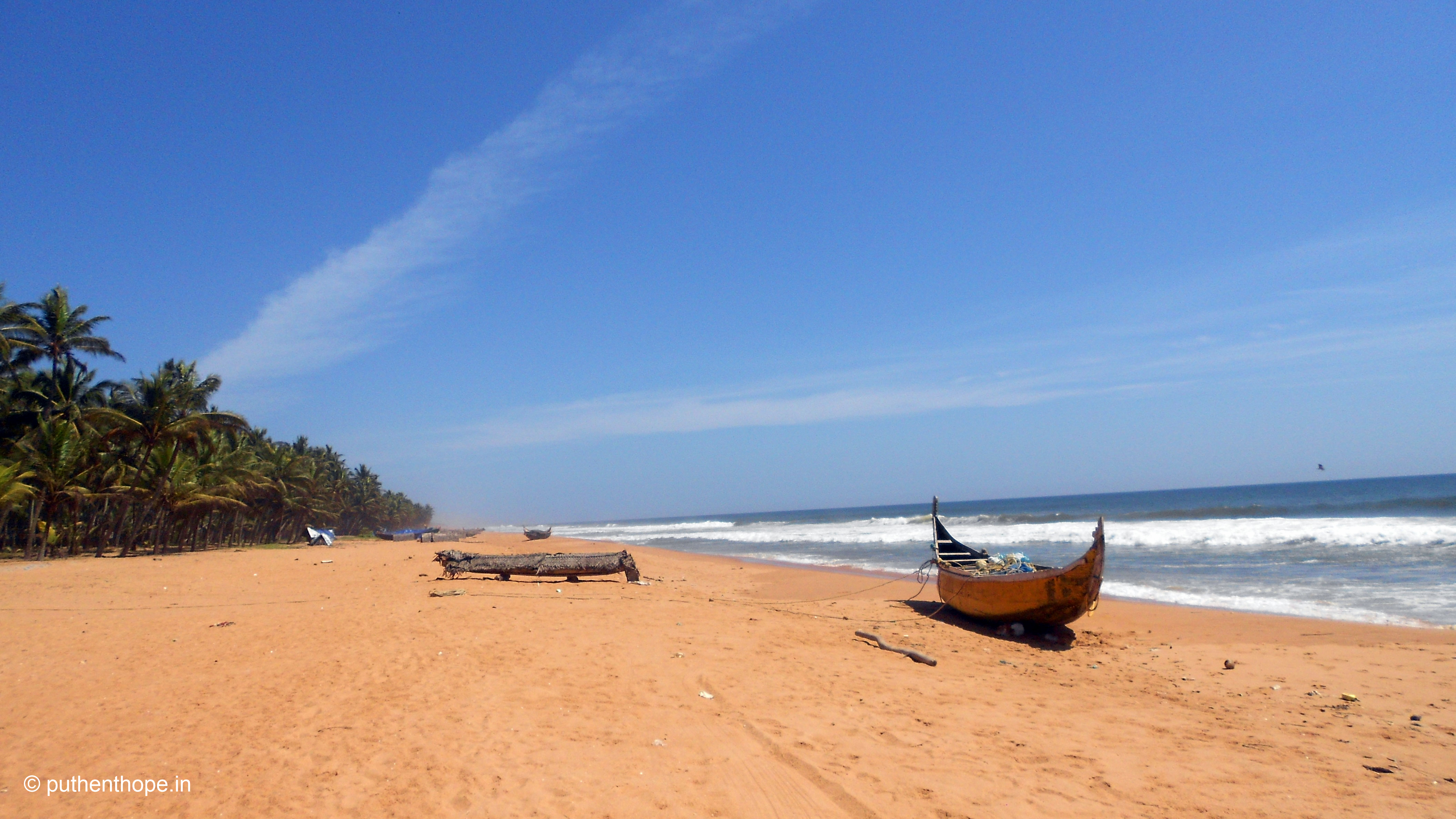
Puthenthope Beach

- The towering St.Ignatius Church which looks like a replica of St.Joseph's Cathedral, Thiruvananthapuram.
- Manmade hills -Thekkekkunnu and Vadakkekuunu
- Vast and beautiful beach of Puthenthope
- Wild Palms on Sea homestay at beachfront
- Palmleaves Beach Resort
- Sea Side Orchid Farm - a 10-acre orchid farm
- The Linta's Golden Beach Ayurvedic Resort

== Interesting facts ==
- Puthenthope is a matrilineal community (ancestral property is inherited to daughters, however nowadays gradual changes can be seen that ancestral property are inherited to both sons and daughters)
- India's First DNA Barcoding Centre is at Puthenthope.
