= Last Bench =

- Directed by: Jiju Asokan
- Produced by: T.B. Raghuanthan
- Starring: Mahesh; Siju Wilson; Vijeesh; Musthafa; Sukanya
- Music by: Mohan Sithara; Vishnu Sarath
- Production company: Kamalam Films
- Distributed by: Kamalam Films
- Release date: 3 August 2012
- Country: India
- Language: Malayalam
- Box office: ₹0.25 crore (US$26,000)

Last Bench is a 2012 Indian Malayalam drama film, directed by Jiju Asokan and produced by T.B. Raghuanthan. The film stars Mahesh, Siju Wilson, Vijeesh, Musthafa, and Sukanya in the lead roles. The film had musical score by Mohan Sithara and Vishnu Sarath. This film marks the Malayalam debut of Mahesh.

== Cast ==
- Mahesh as Rejimon
- Siju Wilson as Wilson Joseph
- Vijeesh as Ambareesh
- Musthafa as Samkutty
- Biyon as Rasheed
- Jyothi Krishna as Sneha
- Sukanya as Rosili
- Manju Satheesh as Deepa
- Chinchu Mohan
- Lakshmi Priya as Smitha
- Vijayan Karanthoor as George
- Ramadevi as Kamalam
- Anoop George
- Balachandran Chullikkad as Vinyan
- Pooja
- K. B. Venu

== Release ==
A reviewer for Rediff gave the film a rating of one-and-a-half out of five stars and noted that "Last Bench turns out to be a major disappointment". The Times of India gave the film one out of five stars and noted that "Last Bench suffers from its intolerable pre-occupation with the past and the way characters are burdened with feelings of loss, guilt and longing".
