= Vettukili Prakash =

Indian actor

- Born: Prakash V. G. 1966 (age 59–60); Elthuruth, Thrissur
- Occupation: Actor
- Years active: 1987–present

Prakash V. G., professionally credited as Vettukili Prakash, is an Indian actor who appears in Malayalam films. He acts in supporting roles.

== Career ==
Prakash born in 1966, hails from Ayyanthole in Thrissur, India. He took graduation in stage acting from School of Drama, Thrissur. He made his acting debut in 1987 with the Malayalam film Theertham. He received his stage name after his character "Vettukili" in the film Ennodu Ishtam Koodamo. He was active in the 1990s, typecasted in supporting comedy roles. In 2017, he appeared in Thondimuthalum Driksakshiyum in a serious role, which helped to break his typecasting.

== Filmography ==
Year	Title	Role	Notes
1987	Theertham	Kunjan Namboothiri	Debut
1988	Isabella	Tony	
1988	Piravi	Hari	
1989	Pooram		
1989	Unnikuttanu Joli Kitti		
1990	Aparaahnam		
1990	Kshanakkathu	Vivek's friend	
1991	Ottayal Pattalam	Velayudhan	
1992	Ennodu Ishtam Koodamo	Vettukili	
1992	Kizhakkan Pathrose		
1995	Alancheri Thamprakkal	Vasudevan	
1995	Puthukkottayile Puthumanavalan	Kunji Krishnan	
1996	Vanarasena	Achuthan	
1998	Dravidan		
1998	Kattathoru Penpoovu		
1999	Onnaamvattam Kandappol	Paappi	
2000	Kochu Kochu Santhoshangal	Sukumaran	
2001	Narendran Makan Jayakanthan Vaka		
2002	Yathrakarude Sradhakku	Office boy	
2005	Achuvinte Amma	Kunjoy	
2007	Katha Parayumpol	Villager	
2008	Veruthe Oru Bharya		
2009	Bhagyadevatha	Charlie	
2010	Kadha Thudarunnu	Venkiti	
2011	Kudumbasree Travels	Sathyan	
2012	Father's Day		
2015	1000 – Oru Note Paranja Katha		
2015	Urumbukal Urangarilla	Bhaskaran	
2017	C/O Saira Banu	Warrier	
2017	Thondimuthalum Driksakshiyum	Sreekandan	
2018	Premasoothram	Subramania Pappan	
2018	Thobama	Vareeth	
2019	Virus	Ambulance driver, Sadashivan	
2019	Ambili	Kurian/Kuriachen	
2019	Sathyam Paranja Viswasikkuvo	Hotel Owner	
2019	And the Oscar Goes To...		
2021	Vellam		
2021	One	Adv. Padmanabhan	
2022	Kallan D'Souza		
2026	Bethlehem Kudumba Unit	Davis	
2026	Avaraachan and sons		
