= Sreeranjini Kodampally =

Sreeranjini Kodamapally is a Carnatic vocalist from Kerala, India who performs in classical concerts and is a playback singer in the film industry. She is presently working as an assistant professor in music at department of music Maharajas college Eranakulam

== Life and education ==
Kodamapally is the daughter of Kodamapally Appukuttan Pillai, a retired teacher and Smt. Ambika Devi, both musicians. Her grandfather, the late Kodampally Gopala Pillai, was a musician who belonged to the Tanjore Tradition of Carnatic. Her brother Kodampally Gopakumar is a violinist from Kerala.

Kodamapally has completed her BA, MA and MPhil in music with 1st rank. In 2014 she is studying for a PhD in music under the guidance of B M Jayashree from the University of Bangalore. She is a student of Sangita Kalaacharya Smt Neela Ramgopal, Palkulangara Ambika Devi, Ashtaman Pillai and Violin Vidushi smt. T H Lalitha of AIR Calicut.

In 2014, Kodamapally is settled in Trivandrum with her husband Pradeep S Nair.

== Career ==
As well as her work as a Carnactic vocalist, Kodamapally has made her entry in to the field of film music with the song Madhava Maasamo from the movie Swapaanam by director Shaji N Karun, the music director is Sreevalsan J Menon.

Kodamapally's audio album NIDRA- music for good sleep, released by Satyam audios has received wide appreciation. She has also performed many fusion concerts with western musicians and Jugalbandis with Hindustani musicians.

She is an " A " grade artiste of All India Radio and Doordarshan.

Kodamapally won the Kerala State Government Chembai award for the young artist in the year 2009. Sreeranjini is also the recipient of Mavelikara Prabhavarama puraskaram for the most talented young musician in the year 2017
