= Jaihind Vayanasala =

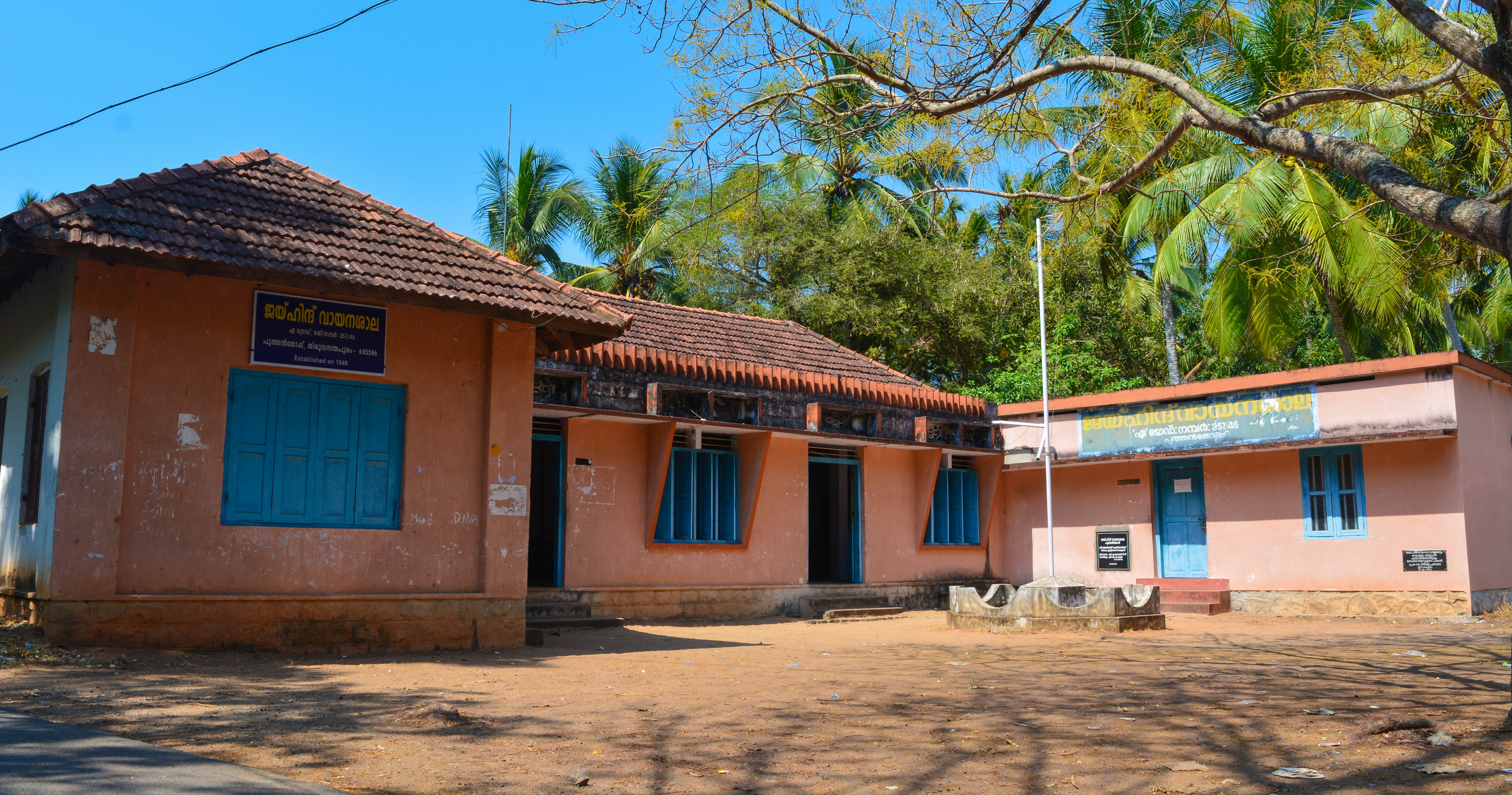
- Jaihind Vayanasala

- Location in Kerala, India
- Coordinates: 8°34′35″N 76°50′20″E

Jaihind Vayanasala is a library situated in Puthenthope, India.

== History ==
The library was established in the year 1946, at the time of the non-violent independence movement in India. The name of the library stems from this era, with "Jai" meaning "Victory" and Hind meaning India. The library proudly exists as the cultural center of Puthenthope. It is the most important cultural center in the Indian coastal area. A traditional boat race and drama festival are the noticeable events during the Christmas period.

The cultural changes and political atmosphere before and after the independent period inspired the young generation of the coastal village, and therefore, they decided to establish a library with the aim of establishing a liberal and secular way of life in this coastal village. Even though the influence of the church was immense during this time, the young people of this era, including Joseph D'cruz, William Sir, Don, Bosco, and many others, had democratically decided to select the name Jaihind instead of selecting the name of any of the patron Saints. The dramas of KPSC, the songs of ONV, and the novels of progressive writers and the progressive movement itself in Kerala had renewed the desire for a change in the educational aspirations and to select a cultural path that was separate from other parts of the coastal villages in Thiruvananthapuram. The establishment of this library itself can be considered as an inspiration for the young people in this village for reading the better books during that era when books were not abundant in these fishing villages. Jaihind Library created a space for the cultural and sports activities for this coastal village, and this is still continuing in Puthenthope after decades of changes. Only a few people in this village are now reported to be involved in fishing activities, while the majority of the young generations of this village are migrants who moved out of this village for making their livelihood, and now they are working in Gulf countries, Europe, the USA, Canada, and Australia.

== Sections in Library ==
This cultural center has been helping to develop communal activities, which include cultural and sports activities during the festival season especially in Christmas time.
