= Premasoothram =

- Theatrical release poster
- Directed by: Jiju Asokan
- Written by: Jiju Asokan
- Based on: Jalajeevitham by Asokan Charuvil
- Produced by: T. B. Raghunathan; Jees Lazar; Litty K. George; Jayan Mathilakam
- Starring: Chemban Vinod Jose; Balu Varghese; Sreejith Ravi; Indrans; Dharmajan Bolgatty
- Cinematography: Swaroop Philip
- Edited by: Ayoob Khan
- Music by: Gopi Sundar
- Production company: Kamalam Films
- Distributed by: JL Films
- Release date: 11 May 2018 (Kerala)
- Country: India
- Language: Malayalam

Premasoothram is a 2018 Indian Malayalam-language romantic comedy film written and directed by Jiju Asokan, based on the short story Jalajeevitham by Asokan Charuvil. The story is set in the period 1980-1990s. The film stars Chemban Vinod Jose, Balu Varghese, Dharmajan Bolgatty, Indrans, Sudheer Karamana and Lijomol Jose. The film was released in Kerala on 11 May 2018. The movie is about a student played by Balu Varghese in one way love with his own classmate played by Lijomol Jose. His antics in trying to woo her is the crux of the whole movie.

== Cast ==
- Chemban Vinod Jose as VKP/Visham Kudicha Pankajakshan
- Balu Varghese as Prakashan
- Lijomol Jose as Ammukutty
- Sudheer Karamana as Manoharan
- Vettukili Prakash as Subramaniyan
- Indrans as Kochubaby
- Dharmajan Bolgatty
- Manju Sunichen as Sarasu
- Anumol as Manjurani
- Sinoj Varghese as Rajappan
- Sreejith Ravi as Keshava Karuvan
- Chethan Jayalal
- Sibi Thomas as Bhasurachandran
- Anjali Nair as Sugandhi Teacher
- Reshmi Anil as The woman carrying the baby
- Vishnu Govindan as Sukumaran
- Vijilesh Karayad as Pandan Paramu
- Preetha Pradeep as Mallika

== Production ==
The film is based on the short story Jalajeevitham from the collection of short stories by Asokan Charuvil. The romantic comedy is set in the period 1980-1990s.

== Release ==
The film was released in Kerala on 11 May 2018.
