= Swapaanam =

- Theatrical poster
- Directed by: Shaji N. Karun
- Screenplay by: Hari Krishanan; Sajeev Pazhoor
- Story by: Shaji N. Karun
- Produced by: M. Rajan
- Starring: Jayaram; Kadambari; Siddique; Vineeth; Lakshmi Gopalaswamy; Ashwini Ranga
- Cinematography: Saji Nair
- Edited by: A. Sreekar Prasad
- Music by: Sreevalsan J Menon
- Production company: Prasad Studios
- Distributed by: Horizon Entertainment
- Release date: 27 February 2014
- Country: India
- Language: Malayalam

Swapaanam (English translation: The Voiding Soul) is a 2014 Indian Malayalam film directed by Shaji N. Karun and produced by M. Rajan for Horizon Entertainments. The film features Jayaram and Kadambari in the lead roles, alongside Siddique, Vineeth, Lakshmi Gopalaswamy in supporting roles. The music was composed by Sreevalsan J Menon, while the script was written by Harikrishnan and Sajeev Pazhoor, based on Shaji's own story. The film was screened in the Dubai International Film Festival.

The film released with Auro 3D sound in selected theatres, becoming the first Malayalam movie and fourth Indian film to employ the technology after Maryan (Tamil), Vishwaroopam(Tamil) and 1- Nenokkadine (Telugu).

== Plot ==
Unni, an expert Chenda player, and Nalini, a talented Mohiniyattam dancer, form a deep artistic and personal attachment that challenges social norms. As Unni gains acclaim for his music, his life gets complicated by friction with his family, including an envious brother, an estranged wife and his questionable parentage. These conflicts exacerbate long-standing vulnerabilies from Unni's past, leading the narrative towards a tragic end.

== Cast ==
- Jayaram as Unni
- Kadambari as Nalini
- Siddique as Narayanan Namboodiri
- Vineeth as Thuppan Namboodiri
- Sharath Das as Prakashan
- Ashwini Ranga as Unni's Mother
- P.D.Namboodiri as Achyuthan
- Udayan Namboodiri as Kuttan
- Lakshmi Gopalaswamy as Kalyani
- Indrans as Selvam
- P. Sreekumar as Shankaran Marar
- Namboothiri as Temple Priest
- K. Suresh Kurup as Pookatri Thirumeni
- Sajitha Madathil as Kuttan's Wife
- Margi Sathi as Achyuthan's Wife
- M.Thankamani (Retd. AIR Staff) as Vineeth's Mother

== Soundtrack ==
All lyrics are written by Manoj Kuroor except where noted; all music is composed by Sreevalsan J Menon.

No.	Title	Lyrics	Artist(s)	Length
1.	"Kaliyay Nee"		Deepu Nair, Meera Ram Mohan
2.	"Kaaminimanisakhi" (Swathi Thirunal Padam)	Swathi Thirunal Rama Varma	Meera Ram Mohan, Kalyani Menon
3.	"Mazhaville"		Amal Antony, Shenkottai Harihara Subramanium
4.	"Maadhava Maasamo"		Hariprasad, Sreeranjini Kodampally
5.	"Andaranagameevidham" (Kundanaachi Talam)		Edappally Ajithkumar, Ratheesh Ramakrishnan, Murali Sangeeth, Vivek
6.	"Oru Vela Raavinnakam"		Lekha R Nair
7.	"Paalaazhithedum"		Sreevalsan J Menon
8.	"Maarasannibhakara" (Banayudham)	Balakavi Ramasashtri	B. Arundhathi
9.	"Kaamopama Roopan" (Banayudham)	Balakavi Ramasashtri	Kottakkal Madhu

== Awards ==
- National Film Award for Best Audiography - D. Yuvaraj
