= Nimisha Sajayan =

Indian actress

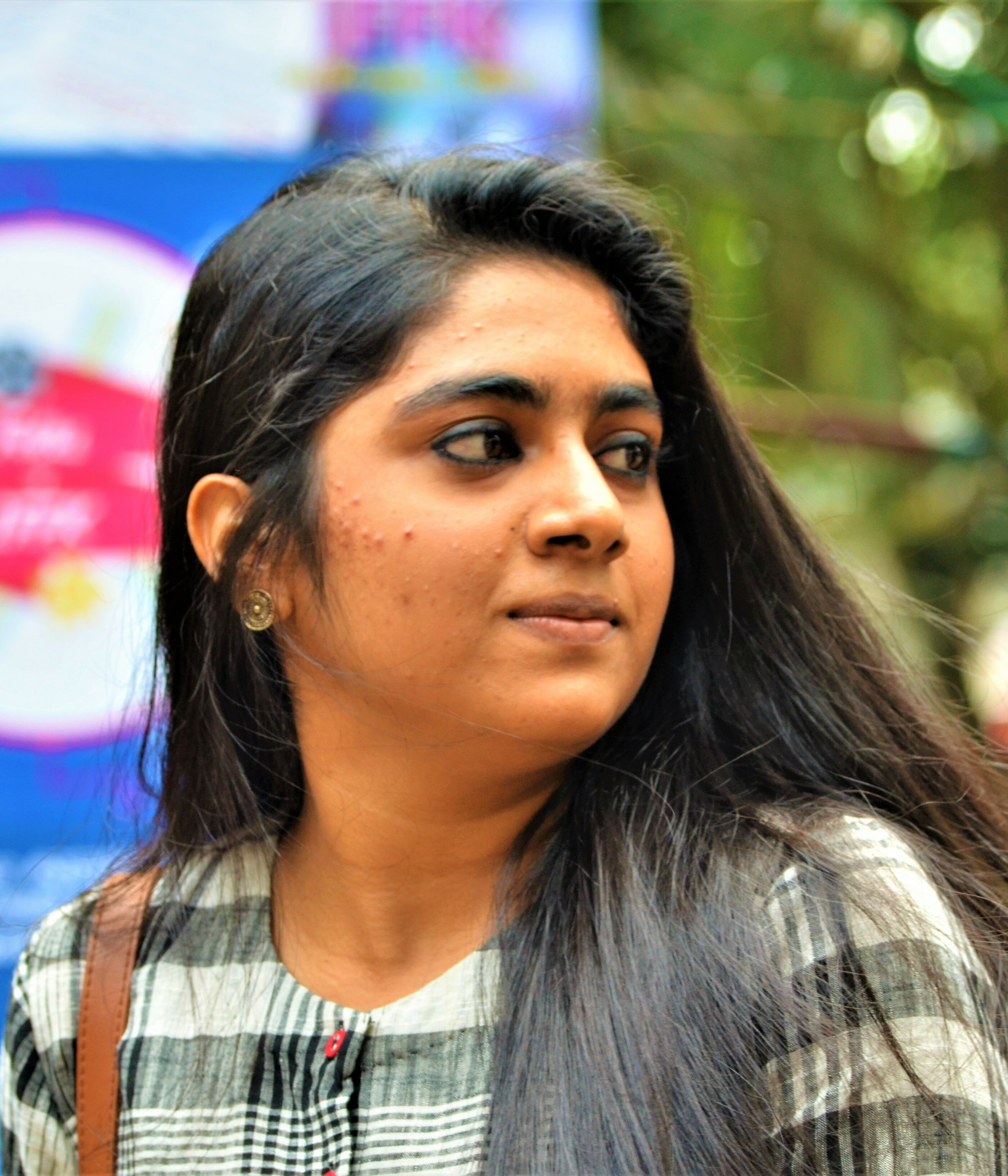
- Nimisha Sajayan in 2018
- Born: Mumbai, Maharashtra, India
- Occupation: Actress
- Years active: 2017–present

Nimisha Sajayan is an acclaimed Indian actress who primarily works in Malayalam films, apart from Tamil and Hindi films. Nimisha made her acting debut with the film Thondimuthalum Driksakshiyum directed by Dileesh Pothan. She won the Kerala State Film Award for Best Actress in 2018 for her performance in Oru Kuprasidha Payyan and Chola. She is also a recipient of three Filmfare Awards.

== Early and personal life ==
Nimisha was born in Mumbai, Maharashtra, India to Sajayan Nair, an engineer, and Bindhu Sajayan. Her family is from Kerala.

She completed her schooling at Carmel Convent School, Mumbai and graduated from KJ Somaiya College, Mumbai.

== Acting career ==
Nimisha started her acting career with the film Thondimuthalum Driksakshiyum, directed by Dileesh Pothan. She then played the lead role in editor B. Ajithk and Rajeev Ravi's Eeda. She won the 49th Kerala State Film Award for Best actress in 2019 for the movies Oru Kuprasidha Payyan directed by Madhupal and Chola directed by Sanal Kumar Sasidharan. Chola premiered at several international film festivals.

In 2021, she acted in The Great Indian Kitchen. The film as well as her performance were well received. The same year, she played lead roles in Nayattu and Malik. In 2022 she was a part of Oru Thekkan Thallu Case, Innale Vare and Heaven. Her upcoming films are Thuramukham and Chera. She made her Tamil debut through A. L. Vijay's Mission: Chapter 1 - Achcham Enbathu Illaiyae film but her first release in Tamil was Chithha in 2023.

== Filmography ==
=== Films ===
Key
†	Denotes films that have not yet been released

List of Nimisha Sajayan film credits and roles
Year	Title	Role	Language	Notes	Ref.
2017	Thondimuthalum Driksakshiyum	Sreeja	Malayalam		
2018	Eeda	Aishwarya	Malayalam		
2018	Mangalyam Thanthunanena	Clara	Malayalam		
2018	Oru Kuprasidha Payyan	Hanna Elizabeth	Malayalam		
2019	Nalpathiyonnu (41)	Bhagyasooyam	Malayalam		
2019	Chola	Janaki	Malayalam		
2019	Stand Up	Keerthi	Malayalam		
2021	The Great Indian Kitchen	Sreedevi Hareesh	Malayalam		
2021	One	Lathika	Malayalam		
2021	Nayattu	WCPO Sunitha	Malayalam		
2021	Malik	Rosline	Malayalam		
2022	Innale Vare	Anjali	Malayalam		
2022	Heaven	Defense councilor	Malayalam	Cameo	
2022	Hawa Hawai	Jyoti	Marathi		
2022	Oru Thekkan Thallu Case	Vasanthi	Malayalam		
2023	Thuramukham	Umani	Malayalam		
2023	Footprints on Water	Meera	Indian English		
2023	Chithha	Shakthi	Tamil		
2023	Jigarthanda DoubleX	Malaiyarasi	Tamil		
2023	Adrishya Jalakangal	Miranda	Malayalam		
2024	Mission: Chapter 1	Nancy Kurian	Tamil		
2024	Lantrani	Manasi Gangopandhey	Hindi		
2025	Crazxy	Bobby	Hindi	Voice role	
2025	DNA	Dhivya Anand	Tamil		
2026	Babita Singh Reporting	ASI Babita Singh	Hindi		
2026	Enna Vilai	Advocate Kanchana	Tamil		

=== Short films ===
List of Nimisha Sajayan short film credits and roles
Year	Title	Role	Notes	Ref.
2017	Nethram	Rape victim		
2020	Ghar Se	Wife	Hindi short film	
2020	Draupadi	Mother	Photo Story	

=== Television ===
Key
†	Denotes television productions that have not yet been released

List of Nimisha Sajayan television credits and roles
Year	Title	Role	Language	Notes	Ref.
2024	Poacher	Mala Yogi	Malayalam	TV series on Prime Video	
2025	Dabba Cartel	Mala	Hindi	TV series on Netflix	

== Awards and nominations ==
List of Nimisha Sajayan's awards and nominations
Award	Year (Note: Refers to the year in which the ceremony was held.)	Category	Work	Result	Ref.
Kerala State Film Awards	2019	Best Actress	Oru Kuprasidha Payyan; Chola	Won	
Kerala Film Critics Association Awards	2019	Best Actress	Oru Kuprasidha Payyan	Won	
Filmfare Awards South	2018	Best Actress (Malayalam)	Thondimuthalum Driksakshiyum	Nominated	
South Indian International Movie Awards	2018	Best Female Debut – Malayalam	Thondimuthalum Driksakshiyum	Won	
South Indian International Movie Awards	2018	Best Actress – Malayalam	Thondimuthalum Driksakshiyum	Nominated	
Asianet Film Awards	2018	Best Actress	Thondimuthalum Driksakshiyum	Nominated	
Asianet Film Awards	2019	Best Star Couple (shared with Shane Nigam)	Eeda	Won	
Asianet Film Awards	2019	Best Character Actress	Oru Kuprasidha Payyan	Nominated	
Filmfare Awards South	2019	Best Actress	Eeda	Nominated	
Filmfare Awards South	2019	Best Actress (Critics)	Eeda	Won	
Vanitha Film Awards	2018	Best Newcomer Actress	Thondimuthalum Driksakshiyum	Won	
IFFM Awards	2021	Best Performance Female (Feature)	The Great Indian Kitchen	Nominated	
IFFM Awards	2021	Honourable Mention for Best Actress (Feature)	The Great Indian Kitchen	Won	
Movie Street Film Excellence Awards	2018	Best Debutant Actor – Female	Thondimuthalum Driksakshiyum	Won	
Movie Street Film Excellence Awards	2019	Best Actor (Female)	Oru Kuprasidha Payyan	Won	
Toronto International South Asian Film Awards	2019	Best Debut Actress	Thondimuthalum Driksakshiyum	Won	
South Indian International Movie Awards	2021	Best Actress	Chola	Nominated	
South Indian International Movie Awards	2021	Best Actress – (Critics)	Chola	Won	
Filmfare Awards South	2022	Best Actress (Malayalam)	The Great Indian Kitchen	Won	
South Indian International Movie Awards	2022	Critics Choice Awards	The Great Indian Kitchen	Won	
Filmfare Awards South	2024	Best Actress	Chithha	Won	
Ananda Vikatan Cinema Awards	2024	Best Actress	Chithha	Won	
