= 1953 Mattancherry shootout =

1953 port shootout in Mattancherry

Mattancherry shootout
- Date: 15 September 1953
- Location: Mattancherry, Kochi, Kerala, India

The Mattancherry shootout called locally as the Mattancherry Kalaapam, was a police shootout that happened on 15 September 1953, involving the port workers demanding the removal of the then port recruitment chappa system and pointing out (which also existed in other places in India and elsewhere, it was "calling-on" in London) and the local police. Three people were killed, they were CX Antony, Said, and Saithali who were 21, 22 and 23 years old respectively. The major protests began on 1 September and ended with the shootout.

== Popular culture ==
The 2023 Malayalam film Thuramukham is based on the protests.
