= Sibi Thomas =

Indian actor (born 1972)

- Born: 15 December 1972 (age 53); Kanhangad, Kerala, India
- Education: Nirmalagiri College
- Occupations: Actor; Police officer; Screenwriter
- Years active: 2017–present
- Police career
- Department: Kerala Police
- Service years: 2004 - Present
- Rank: Deputy superintendent of police (DySP)

Sibi Thomas is an Indian police officer and actor. He appears in Malayalam films. Having made his debut with Thondimuthalum Driksakshiyum in 2017. He is also serving police officer with the Kerala Police.

== Personal life ==
Sibi Thomas was born in Kanhangad, Kerala. He graduated in BSc Chemistry from Nirmalagiri College, Kuthuparamba. After graduation, he joined the Kerala Police in 2003 as a Sub Inspector.

== Filmography ==
| † | Denotes films that have not yet been released |

=== As actor ===
| Year | Title | Role(s) | Notes |
|---|---|---|---|
| 2017 | Thondimuthalum Driksakshiyum | S.I Sajan | |
| 2018 | Kuttanadan Marpappa | Sub Inspector | |
| 2018 | Premasoothram | Basura Chandran | |
| 2018 | Kamuki | Professor | |
| 2018 | Oru Kuprasidha Payyan | Praveen Kumar | |
| 2019 | Sidharthan Enna Njan | | |
| 2019 | Happy Sardar | Dr. Tony Jose | |
| 2020 | Trance | Esther Villa Security | |
| 2021 | Jai Bhim | SP Ashok Varadan | Tamil movie |
| 2022 | Kuttavum Shikshayum | Aravindan | |
| 2022 | Nna Thaan Case Kodu | Johny | |
| 2022 | Palthu Janwar | Veterinary doctor | |
| 2023 | Laika | | |
| 2023 | Oru Vattam Koodi | George | |
| 2024 | Grrr | Fire and Rescue Officer Sujanapalan | |
| 2024 | Porattu Nadakam | Paint Contractor | |
| 2026 | Ankam Attahasam | | |

=== As writer ===
| Year | Title | Director | Notes |
|---|---|---|---|
| 2022 | Kuttavum Shikshayum | Rajeev Ravi | Released on 27 May 2022 |
