= St Ignatius Church, Thiruvananthapuram =

Church in Kerala, India

St Ignatius Church Thiruvananthapuram
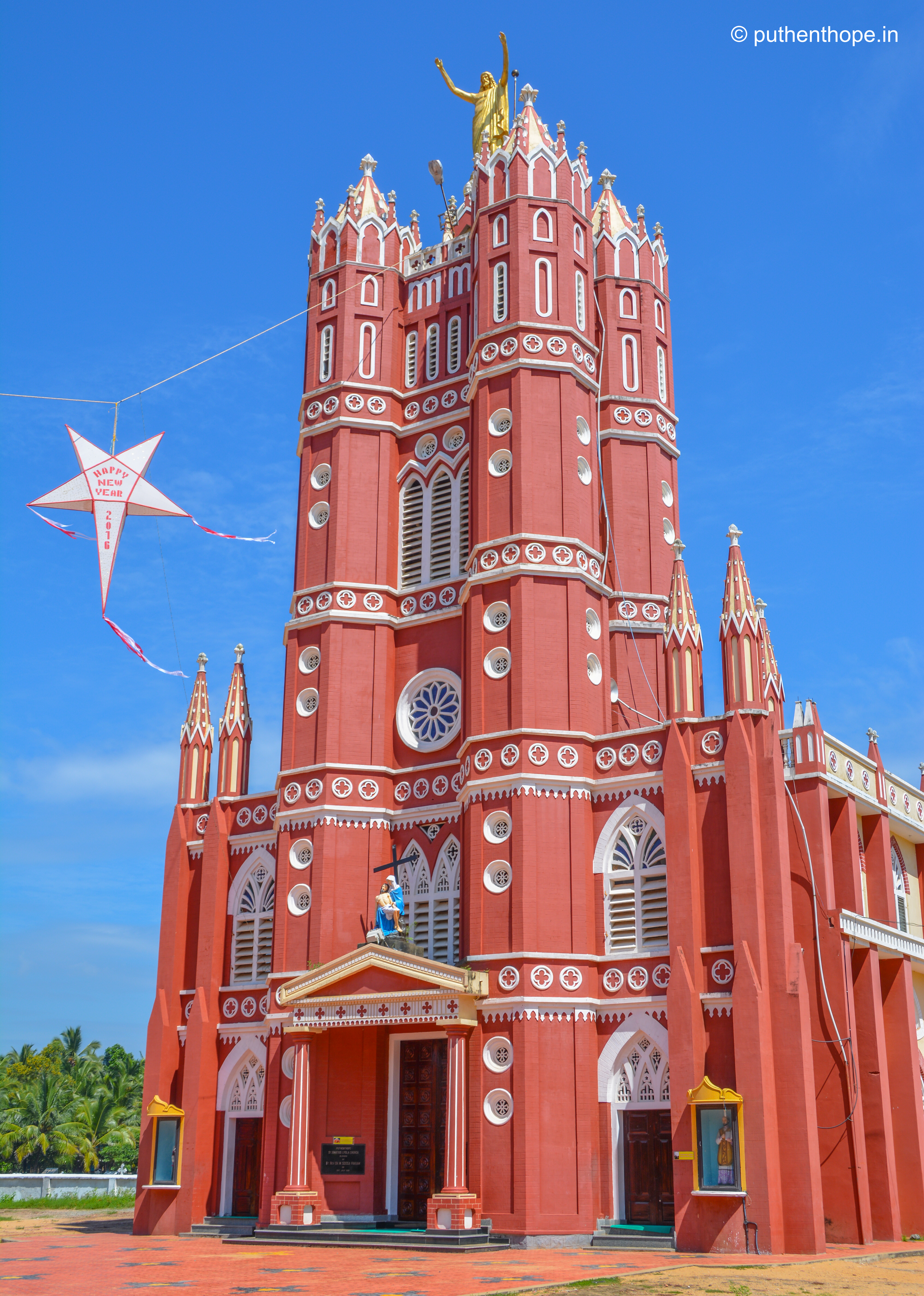
- St Ignatius Church Thiruvananthapuram
- 8°34′23″N 76°50′12″E
- Denomination: Latin Catholic

History
- Status: Church
- Founder: Society of Jesus
- Dedication: Ignatius of Loyola

Architecture
- Functional status: Active

St Ignatius Church Puthenthope, Thiruvananthapuram, is a Catholic church located in the Kadinamkulam panchayat of Thiruvananthapuram, Kerala, India.

Puthenthope claims to have rich historical legacy. It is generally believed that during 1543-44 period, St. Francis Xavier visited the place and founded the church, perhaps in a rudimentary form. The church was rebuilt in 1989, with the foundation stone being blessed by Pope John Paul II during his visit to Thiruvananthapuram in 1986.

The church is the replica of St.Joseph's Cathedral in Thiruvananthapuram City. A grotto of Mary is also built in front of the church and the statue of Mary in the grotto was brought from Lourde by a native of Puthenthope. A parochial house, which shows the typical architecture of Kerala is also situated nearby the church. St.Ignatius Parish community hall is another building situated along with the church in the junction of Puthenthope.

The church is the epicenter of all religious and social activities. The community celebrate Christmas, Easter and other Catholic festivals.

== Liturgical Services ==
Sunday
06:00 AM	Holy Mass
9:00 AM	Holy Mass for Catechism Students
05:00 PM	Holy Mass
Monday & Tuesday
05:00 PM	Holy Mass
Tuesday to Saturday
06:15 AM	Holy Mass
Wednesday 06:00 PM Eucharistic Adoration

== See also ==
- List of Jesuit sites
