= Sajeev Pazhoor =

Indian screenwriter

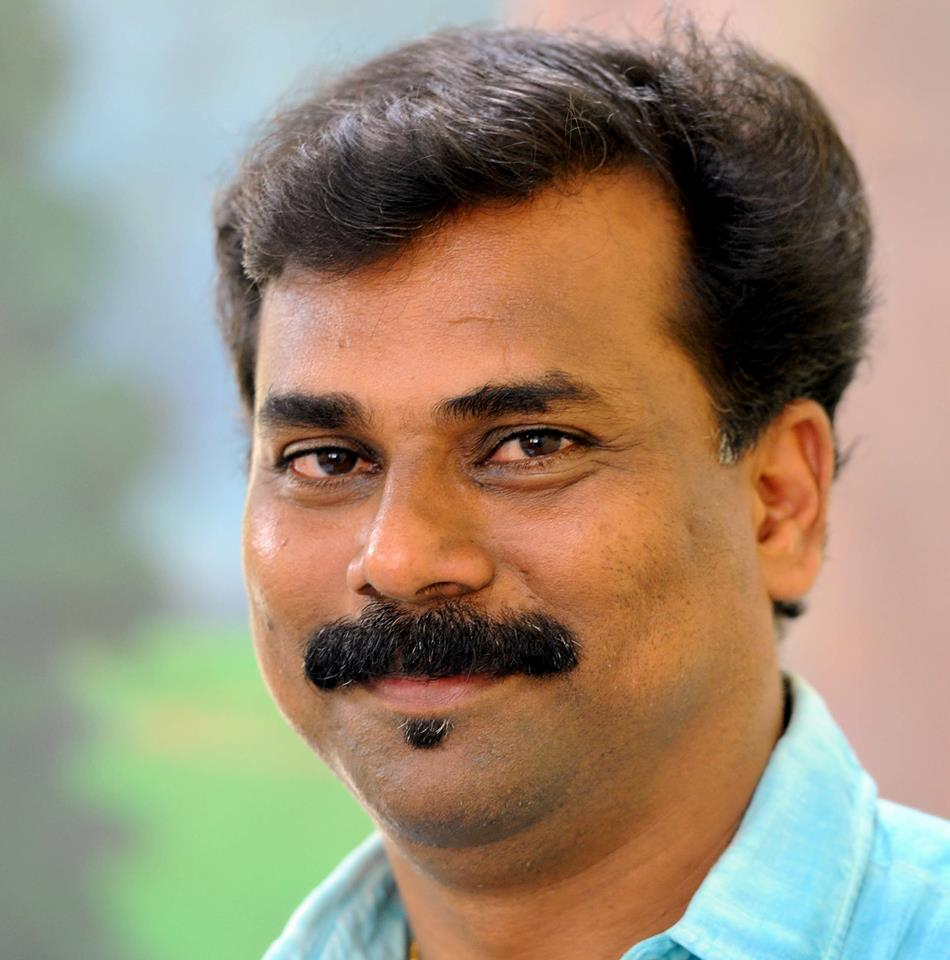
- Born: Pazhoor, Kerala, India
- Education: Mahatma Gandhi University
- Occupations: Screenwriter; Actor; Novelist; Director; Government Employee
- Years active: 2003–present
- Spouse: Deepa Sajeev
- Children: 2

Sajeev Pazhoor (born 8 April ) is an Indian screenwriter, novelist and director in Malayalam cinema. He is known for his movie Thondimuthalum Driksakshiyum starring Fahadh Faasil and directed by Dileesh Pothan. He made his debut in Malayalam film industry with Swapaanam(2013) directed by Shaji N. Karun. He had scripted and directed more than 80 Documentary film.

== Personal life ==
Sajeev Pazhoor was born in the village of Pazhoor in Ernakulam district on 8 April. He is the eldest son of P. K. Sankaran Nair and Visalakshi. He received primary education from the Government L. P school Pazhoor and Government High School Piravom. He did his pre-university course and graduated in Malayalam Literature at Government College Manimalakunnu. He also secured Post Graduate Diploma in Journalism and started working as a sub-editor and later senior sub-editor in Deshabhimani daily. After his 19 years of service in Deshabhimani, he took voluntary retirement and started working as an Assistant Information Officer in the Department of Information and Public Relations, Government of Kerala. Currently, he is working as the Assistant Cultural Development Officer at the same.

== Career ==
His debut documentary Agnisakshiyude Sakshi brought him State television Award for best Documentary Director (2003). After that, he directed and scripted almost hundreds of documentaries and ten short stories. Later in 2014, he won the State Award for the Best Documentary Director. He entered the Malayalam film industry as an assistant director and later associate director under Shaji. N. Karun. He made his debut in the screenplay arena through Shaji. N. Karun's movie Swaapanam. He also worked with Lenin Rajendran and Sanjeev Shivan as associate director. He wrote the screenplay for the movie Swayam directed by R. Sarath. Meanwhile, he worked as associate director and script editor of many movies in the Kokborok language. Of which the movie Yarwng received a National Film Award for the best feature movie in Kokborok. He wrote the story, screenplay and dialogue for Thondimuthalum Driksakshiyum directed by Dileesh Pothan that has won various awards.. He won the Kerala State Award for Best Scriptwriter in 2017 for the movie. He worked for the movie Sathyam Paranga Viswasikumo by G. Prajith.

== Short Film/Documentary Film ==
Year	Title	Role	Notes
2011	Agnisakshiyude Sakshi (Life and times of Agnisakshi) - Short film	Writer/Director	State television Award for Best Documentary Director - 2003
2011	Chood(Soddem) - Short film	Writer/Director	
2015	Sangeetham M.K Arjunan - Documentary film	Writer/Director	State television Award for Best Documentary Director - 2014

== Feature Film ==
Year	Title	Role	Notes
2013	Swapaanam	Screenplay Co-Writer with Harikrishnan	Directed by Shaji N. Karun
2017	Thondi Muthalum Dhriksakshiyum	Story/Screenplay Writer	Directed by Dileesh Pothan
2017	Swayam (Selfless)	Screenplay Writer with R. Sarath	Directed by R. Sarath
2019	Sathyam Paranja Viswasikkuvo	Story/Screenplay Writer	Directed by G. Prajith
2021	Keshu Ee Veedinte Nadhan	Story/Screenplay writer	Directed by Nadirshah
2026	Enna Vilai	Director/Writer	Tamil film

== Awards ==
Year	Award	Programme	Category	Notes
2003	Kerala State Television Awards	Agnisakshiyude Saakshi - Short film	Best Director	
2008	International Film Festival of Kerala	Media reporter	Best Media Reporter (print)	
2014	Kerala State Television Awards	Sangeetham-M.K. Arjunan Documentary film	Best Director	
2017	Kerala State Awards For Malayalam Films	Thondimuthalum Driksakshiyum	Best Screenplay Writer	
2017	Asianet Film Awards	Thondimuthalum Driksakshiyum	Best Script Writer	
2017	Kerala Film Critics Awards	Thondimuthalum Driksakshiyum	Best Script Writer	
2018	Flowers Indian Film Awards	Thondimuthalum Driksakshiyum	Best Script Writer	
2018	National Award	Thondimuthalum Driksakshiyum	Best Original Screenplay	
