= Kuttavum Shikshayum (2022 film) =

2022 film

- Theatrical release poster
- Directed by: Rajeev Ravi
- Written by: Sibi Thomas; Sreejith Divakaran
- Produced by: Arun Kumar V. R.
- Starring: Asif Ali; Sunny Wayne; Alencier Ley Lopez; Sharaf U Dheen; Senthil Krishna
- Cinematography: Suresh Rajan
- Edited by: B. Ajithkumar
- Music by: Dawn Vincent
- Production company: Film Roll Productions
- Distributed by: Film Roll Productions
- Release date: 27 May 2022
- Running time: 137 minutes
- Country: India
- Language: Malayalam

Kuttavum Shikshayum (transl. Crime and punishment) is a 2022 Indian Malayalam-language crime drama film directed by Rajeev Ravi and produced by Arun Kumar V. R. under the banner of Film Roll Productions. The film stars Asif Ali, Sunny Wayne, Alencier Ley Lopez, Sharaf U Dheen, and Senthil Krishna. The film revolves around a mysterious robbery that took place in Kerala.

== Plot ==
In Kerala, CI Sajan Philip starts investigating a jewellery break in case in his locality. The thieves had cut open the jewelry safe and escaped with some gold. There are no visuals present at the area since the shop CCTVs are not working for some time now. Sajan gathers the team consisting of SI Basheer, CPOs Rajesh Mathew, Abin Raj and SI Rajeevan, where they initially investigate around a jewellery store's ex-employee named Aravindan, who is suspected by the owner's son since Aravindan was dismissed from service earlier for theft from the store.

Upon investigating further, the team finds out that Aravindan had earlier took some jewelry from store to help his lover's family in debt, believing their words that it will be replaced quickly with money from a loan amount. He had to sell his own property in the end to give back the ornaments to the owner and avoid any legal action. From the CCTV visuals on the market the team finds out a commercial purpose van which has a plate unidentified by the local taxi driver as a routine local vehicle. From Rajesh's local contacts they trace the ownership of that vehicle to a loan shark named Mookkan Balan.

On arresting him, Balan tells them that he had leased out the vehicle to a North Indian migrant worker family, who were traveling clothes salesman using the vehicle for that purpose. Almost certain that the robbery is done by the migrant laborer group, the team confirms their suspicions after secretly searching their rented house which had traces of the stolen jewellery boxes. They find that the phone number of one of the gang members received from Mukkan is switched off from the day of robbery and found to be in the range of an UP-Rajasthan border village in between momentarily.

The team sets out to North India to nab the culprits under the approval of SP Roopa. They are offered support by the local police station officials and receive rooms booked in a shoddy place. After spending a day there, Sajan and his team shifts themselves at their own expense to a much better place, but chooses not to vacate the initial lodge as they do not want to create any ill-feeling with the local cops. The team learns that the thefts are done by locals belonging to a nearby village notorious for the thieving inhabitants who do not allow any police to enter their area and are violent in defending their turf and kin.

They scan the nearby areas with photographs of the accused (extracted from the photo IDs they had given in Kerala to get SIM cards) and finds out one of them as a local hooch suppliers aid. The team arrests them after posing as prospective buyers and plans to stakeout their village to nab the rest. However, he breaks out of Rajesh's custody while he dozes off in the middle of his night watch. After a couple of unsuccessful attempts, the team finally nabs the gang members from the village at the night and escape from the womenfolk who came to attack them.

While preparing to take them back to Kerala, the villagers block the first hotels entrance thinking that the team is staying there. Gaining some time, Sajan and the team escape with the culprits from the opposite hotel when a passing vehicle blocks the villagers view and successfully arrives back to Kerala. Despite the daring operation carried out by Sajan and the team, the gang members end up getting bail. In the aftermath, Sajan and his team chases another gang of criminals for another case.

== Cast ==
- Asif Ali as CI Sajan Philip
- Alencier Ley Lopez as SI Basheer
- Sunny Wayne as Senior CPO Rajesh Mathew
- Sharaf U Dheen as CPO Abin Raj
- Senthil Krishna as SI Rajeevan
- Sibi Thomas as Aravindan
- Madhusoodanan as DYSP Madhusoodhanan Nair
- Jenny Pallath as SP Roopa.G IPS
- Mano Jose as Newspaper Agent Subair
- Dinesh Pradhan as Inspector Anil Sharma of Dholpur
- Bobby as Constable Manoj
- Sanjay Vidrohi as Inspector Ashok Pankaj
- Ashok Kumar as SP of Sanjay Kumar of Dholpur
- Jayashankar as Varghese (Jewellery owner)
- Arjun Narayanan as Rahul (Jewellery owner's son)
- G.Sethunath as Mukkan Balan
- Srinda as Mukkan's wife
- Deshraj Gurjar as Nethram
- Pooja Gurjar as Nethram's sister
- Maheshwari Shekhawat as Nethram's wife
- Jibin as SI Jeevan
- Renju as CPO Aswin
- Vasudevan.R.Varma as Paily
- Siddik as Forensic officer
- Nithesh as Bajarangi
- Bhavar Singh as Sisodiya

== Production ==
The story is about a real-life incident that happened in Kasargod. It was written by real-life cop and actor Sibi Thomas with journalist Sreejith Divakaran. Principal photography of the film was started on 7 February 2020. After taking a break due to the COVID-19 pandemic in India, the film resumed shooting in November 2020 and was completed in December in Rajasthan.

== Release ==
It was anticipated to release around September 2020, but the release was postponed several times due to the COVID-19 pandemic. The film was released on 27 May 2022.

=== Home media ===
The film started streaming on Netflix from 26 June 2022.

== Reception ==
=== Critical response ===
Anna Mathews from The Times of India gave 3/5 stars and wrote "Die-hard investigation thriller fans will enjoy Kuttavum Shikshayum. It is a clean film, so it might also be an interesting film for a family outing." S. R. Praveen of The Hindu wrote "Kuttavum Shikshayum is an accurate, detailed portrayal of a police investigation, but lacks a script which can engage the audience."

Sajin Shrijith of The New Indian Express gave 3.5/5 stars and wrote "There is no compulsion to opt for commercial cinema gimmicks here (as seen in Kammattippadam). Kuttavum Shikshayum finds Rajeev Ravi at his most grounded."Anna M. M. Vetticad of Firstpost gave 3.25/5 stars and wrote "Kuttavum Shikshayum is unusual within the universe of police procedurals. Rajeev Ravi is as purposeful in his storytelling as Sajan and his men are in their investigation. Without any sound and fury, the film manages to be a scary, edge-of-the-seat thriller. For those interested in police practices, this is unconventional yet exciting cinema."

Goutham VS of The Indian Express wrote "While watching Kuttavum Sikshayum, you might be reminded of Churuli, but the narrative of Rajeev Ravi's latest movie is as realistic as it can get." Padmakumar. K of Onmanorama wrote "The merits of the plot are dragged down by the lack of a solid script. Though, at times it provides the charm of a naturalistic portrayal, plenty of sloppy links mar the flow of sequences. Though the plot is engaging, it can't be termed thrilling." Sanjith Sidhardhan of OTTplay gave 3.5/5 stars and wrote "While Kuttavum Shikshayum might not find its place among Rajeev Ravi's best two works, it does have his signature style written all over and the filmmakers deserves credit for taking a subject based on true incidents and not giving it an over-the-top treatment by making it as gripping entertainer. The performances of the cast as well as the brilliant cinematography ensures that the movie is a good watch, if you prefer realistic crime dramas."
