= Eeda =

2018 film directed by B Ajithkumar

- Theatrical release poster
- Directed by: B. Ajithkumar
- Written by: B. Ajithkumar
- Produced by: Sharmila Rajaa
- Starring: Shane Nigam; Nimisha Sajayan
- Cinematography: Pappu
- Edited by: B. Ajithkumar
- Music by: John P. Varkey; Chandran Veyattummal
- Production companies: Collective Phase One; Delta Studio
- Distributed by: LJ Films
- Release date: 5 January 2018
- Country: India
- Language: Malayalam

Eeda (transl. Here) is a 2018 Indian Malayalam-language romance film written, edited and directed by B. Ajithkumar (in his directorial debut). The film is a modern take on William Shakespeare's Romeo and Juliet, set in the backdrops of political violence in Kannur, north Malabar. Shane Nigam and Nimisha Sajayan play the lead roles. Eeda was produced by Sharmila Rajaa through Delta Studio, in collaboration with Collective Phase One. The executive producers were TRS Muthukumaar, K.J. Ayyappan, and Sukumar Thekkepatt. The film won the John Abraham Award for Best Malayalam Film in 2017.

== Plot ==
The story set in north Malabar region of Kerala. Anand/ Nandu (Shane Nigam) is an MBA graduate who works in an entry-level managerial post in an insurance company in Mysore. While in his hometown in Kannur on leave, he happens to meet Aishwarya/ Ammu (Nimisha Sajayan) who is also a Kannur native and a student in Mysore. They meet on a hartal day and he helps her evade politicians who called for the hartal and drops her home. After a few initial chats and phone calls, they find each other in love.

Anand's family and Aishwarya's family are active in two opposing political parties in Kannur. When Aishwarya gets to know about this, she decides to break up because she does not want to see Anand killed. But Anand was persistent and the duo continues the relation.

Aishwarya's family decides to get her married to Sudhakaran, a close family friend who is also an active politician in the political party which Aishwarya's family supports. Aishwarya decides to do register marriage with Anand and they both decides to register their marriage at Mysore. But before the marriage could take place, Anand gets a call that Anand's close friend is murdered in Kannur in a retaliatory political clash. Anand comes home to attend the final rites.

Anand gets to know that his family's party has planned to murder Karippally Dineshan, the first cousin of Aishwarya as revenge for Anand's close friend's murder. Anand gets Dineshan's phone number from Aishwarya and calls him and says he wants to meet up. Anand warns Dineshan that the rival party is planning to kill Dineshan, but Dineshan is not bothered. On the way home, Dineshan was attacked. Anand tries to stop the attackers but fails. He then takes Dineshan to hospital but Dineshan does not survive.

Police as well as Anand's family members and their political party gets to know that Anand had called Dineshan on that day and the Police names Anand as the prime suspect in the murder, with other members of the party as other suspects. Unbeknownst to Anand, Anand's family's political party does not clear the air and allows the police to believe that Anand also is involved in the murder. This is done as a move to confine Anand to his family's party's holds forever, and also to give him a punishment for trying to apparently side with the opposing party by helping Dineshan. Anand is forced to go in a hideout due to pressure from his family and party. Since Anand had to switch off his phone to avoid him being traced by police, Aishwarya could not contact him. In an effort to save Anand, Aishwarya agrees to marry Sudhakaran in return of freeing Anand from the police case. Anand escapes from the hideout arranged by his family after realising that he is going to be the next scapegoat whom the opposing party will murder to take revenge on Dineshan's death. He seeks asylum in Aishwarya's friend's house. This friend's husband is a bedridden victim of another political clash. Meanwhile, Aishwarya is married off to Sudhakaran in a civil ceremony. With the supporting words of the bedridden political clash victim, Anand tries to reach Sudhakaran's home to meet Aishwarya as the evening reception of her marriage progresses.

Anand is attacked by opposing party goons and is running and hiding from them. Meanwhile, Aishwarya demands that Sudhakaran do the needful to release Anand from the police case, and when he refuses to answer satisfactorily and indicates that they go to sleep, she states upright that she agreed to the marriage to get Anand released, but she did not agree to sleep with anyone. Angered, Sudhakaran calls up his party's political goons in front of Aishwarya and orders that Anand be pursued and killed. He goes inside the house while a shocked Aishwarya sits alone outside in the dark. Aishwarya decides to go in search of Anand alone in the night. Meanwhile, Anand is being chased by Sudhakaran's party goons and thinks that he will get killed, and so he switches on the phone to call the police, deciding to surrender, finding that to be the safest way to survive. At that time Aishwarya calls Anand and he tells her where he is, which is nearby. While on the run, Anand, to save himself, has to attack one of the goons chasing him and the goon appears to be killed. He is exhausted and hallucinates a dream sequence from the day he first met Aishwarya. Bleeding and crawling, he manages to find an equally exhausted Aishwarya at the forest temple they used to meet earlier at. Anand falls on her lap and crying and relieved and scared all at the same time, and exhausted, they both sleep off. The movie ends when as the morning dawns, they hold hands and walks onto the street, ready to face their uncertain future. Another hartal for the murder of a member of Anand's family's political party is being announced in the background.

There is also an alternative interpretation to the climax scene that Anand in fact died in the forest that night, and him coming to Aishwarya and sleeping on her lap that night, and later walking with her onto the street are all her hallucinations, and that the hartal call in the background for the murder of a member of Anand's political party, is regarding the death of Anand himself.

== Cast ==
- Shane Nigam as Anand Balakrishnan
- Nimisha Sajayan as Aishwarya Gopal
- Surabhi Lakshmi as Pushpalatha
- Alancier Ley Lopez as Govindhan
- Sujith Sankar as Karippally Dineshan
- Manikandan Achari as Upendran
- Sudhi Koppa as Thulaseedharan
- P. Balachandran as Sriram Bhatt
- Shelly Kishore as Leela
- Abu Valayamkulam as Sudhakaran
- Rajesh Sharma as Unnikrishnan
- Babu Annur as Gopalan (Aishwarya's father)
- Sunitha as Radhika
- Vijayan Karanthoor as Anand's father
