= Urumbukal Urangarilla =

- Theatrical-release poster
- Directed by: Jiju Asokan
- Written by: Jiju Asokan
- Produced by: T. B Ragunathan
- Starring: Vinay Forrt; Chemban Vinod Jose; Sudheer Karamana
- Cinematography: Vishnu Narayanan
- Edited by: Lijo Paul
- Music by: Gopi Sunder
- Production company: Kamalam Films
- Release date: 19 September 2015
- Running time: 139 minutes
- Country: India
- Language: Malayalam

Urumbukal Urangarilla (transl. Ants Don't Sleep) is a 2015 Indian Malayalam-language comedy thriller film written and directed by Jiju Asokan. It features Vinay Forrt, Chemban Vinod Jose, Sudheer Karamana, Aju Varghese, Musthafa, Innocent, Ananya, Vanitha Krishnachandran, Janaki Krishnan, Thesni Khan and Kalabhavan Shajon. The film was released on 19 September 2015 to positive reviews.

== Plot ==
A young man named Manoj associates with Kelu Ashan, a guru of thieves, to learn the tricks of the craft. However, Kelu Ashan is now old and retired and hence, introduces him to one of his former disciples, Benny, to train him in the "art of robbery". Benny trains Manoj well. After Benny is caught, Manoj meets Kelu Ashan again, who teaches him the "science of theft". Manoj eventually gets caught and is sent to jail where he meets Benny. In jail, Manoj meets a dangerous thief named Carlos and befriends him. After getting released, Carlos plans to rob a house along with Manoj's friends. In a twist, it emerges that Manoj had actually been looking for Carlos all along as he had murdered his parents. His motivation to become a thief and go to jail emerged after he learned that Carlos was also in the jail. The robbery was actually a plan used to trap Carlos. After revealing all this, Manoj kills Carlos viciously by pouring honey, slathering sugar solution all over his body and scattering meat ants. Later, Manoj starts an old age home and his friends and Benny are shown living happily.

== Cast ==
- Vinay Forrt as Vinod /Manoj
- Chemban Vinod Jose as Benny
- Innocent as Madhavan Nair
- Sudheer Karamana as Kelu Aasan
- Aju Varghese as Babukuttan
- Musthafa as Balu
- Ananya as Sheela
- Vanitha Krishnachandran as Radha
- Janaki Krishnan as Deepa
- Kalabhavan Shajon as Carlos
- Sreejith Ravi as Choodan Rajappan
- Santhosh Keezhattoor as Anto
- Vettukili Prakash as Bhaskaran
- Thesni Khan as Rosely
- Manju Sunichan as Janamma
- Lakshmipriya as Anitha (cameo)
- Pradeep Kottayam as Sulu's husband (cameo)

== Music ==
Urumbukal Urangarilla

Soundtrack album to Urumbukal Urangarilla by Gopi Sunder
- Released: 6 September 2015
- Genre: Feature film soundtrack
- Language: Malayalam
- Producer: T. B Ragunathan

The music was scored by Gopi Sunder and the tracks were penned by Hari Narayanan.

Song	Singer	Lyrics
"Muthe Muthe"	P. Jayachandran, Swetha Mohan	B. K. Harinarayanan
"Kallan Kallan Kallan"	Mithun Raj	B.K. Harinarayanan
"Urumbukal Urangarilla"	Midhun Anand, Ajay Sen, Gopi Sundar	B. K. Harinarayanan

== Reception ==
Sify gave the verdict "above average" and said "Urumbukal Urangarilla may not offer many surprises and may not be that great for a discerning viewer. But even then this one has its moments for sure and ends up as a decent entertainer".

Metromatinee.com wrote "Urumbukal Urangarilla is nicely executed and technically the movie stands on its feet", also added "Urumbukal Urangarilla is a decent enough effort that engages off and on. There is some well worked out humour and if some avoidable glitches weren't there this one would have endeared even better to the audience".

Nowrunning.com rated 2.5 out of 6 stars and said "Urumbukal Urangarilla is original and creative, and comes across as an appealing cinematic disquisition on a population that apparently never sleeps. It's a quirky, comic film that provides plenty of silly, and yet inventive fun".
