= Thuramukham (2023 film) =

2023 film directed by Rajeev Ravi

- Theatrical release poster
- Directed by: Rajeev Ravi
- Written by: Gopan Chidambaran
- Produced by: Sukumar Thekkepat; Jose Thomas; Listin Stephen
- Starring: Nivin Pauly; Indrajith Sukumaran; Joju George; Arjun Ashokan; Sudev Nair; Manikandan R. Achari
- Cinematography: Rajeev Ravi
- Edited by: B. Ajithkumar
- Music by: K; Shahabaz Aman
- Production companies: Collective Phase One; Pauly Jr. Pictures; Thekkepat Films; Queen Mary Movies
- Distributed by: Magic Frames
- Release date: 10 March 2023
- Country: India
- Language: Malayalam

Thuramukham (transl. Harbor) is a 2023 Indian Malayalam-language political action drama film directed and filmed by Rajeev Ravi and written by Gopan Chidambaran. It is based on the play of the same name by K. M. Chidambaran, Gopan's father. The film stars Nivin Pauly, Indrajith Sukumaran, Joju George, Arjun Ashokan, Sudev Nair, Manikandan R. Achari, Senthil Krishna, Nimisha Sajayan, Poornima Indrajith, and Darshana Rajendran in prominent roles. It presents the harbor workers protest against the Chappa labor allocation system practiced during the 1940s and 50s in Cochin district of Kerala.

After multiple delays, Thuramukham was theatrically released on 10 March 2023.The film got mixed reviews and was a box office bomb.

== Plot ==
The story is set in the backdrop of workers' struggles and protests against the infamous 'Chappa' system of casual labour allocation and the primitive "work guarantee" scheme that was practiced at the Mattancherry harbor in Kochi during the 1940s and 50s.

During pre-dawn hours, crowds of labourers would gather around the house of the employer who would throw metal tokens called chappa into the waiting labourers who would fight over them. Whoever managed to get one a token would be given work for the day at the wharves or godowns. Protests against this system had resulted in the police shooting and the killing of three labourers. The story further revolves around two brothers on opposing sides on the day of labourers' epic struggle against dock bosses.

== Cast ==
- Nivin Pauly as Mattancherry Moidu
- Indrajith Sukumaran as Santo Gopalan
- Joju George as Mymoo, Moidu's father
- Arjun Ashokan as Hamza, Moidu's brother
- Darshana Rajendran as Khadeeja, Moidu's sister
- Nimisha Sajayan as Umani, Moidu's wife
- Poornima Indrajith as Moidu's mother
- Sudev Nair as Pacheek
- Manikandan R. Achari as Umboocha, Mymoo's friend
- Senthil Krishna as Srank
- Divya Gopinath

== Production ==
The principal photography of the film was completed in January 2020 but the release was delayed for a long time due to the outbreak of COVID-19 pandemic.

== Music ==
The film features songs and background score composed by K and Shahabaz Aman.

Thuramukham

Soundtrack album by K, Shahabaz Aman
- Released: 23 March 2023
- Recorded: 2019–2020
- Genre: Feature film soundtrack
- Length: 17:05
- Language: Malayalam
- Label: Magic Frames Music
- Producers: K, Shahabaz Aman

K chronology
Panni Kutty (2022)	Thuramukham (2023)

Shahabaz Aman chronology
Halal Love Story (2020)	Thuramukham (2023)	Uschool (2023)

External audio
- Original Motion Picture Soundtrack, from Spotify

All tracks are written by Anwar Ali.

Thuramukham track listing
No.	Title	Lyrics	Music	Singer(s)	Length
1.	"Karakkenne Thanichakkeettu"	Anwar Ali	K	Sayanora Philip	04:20
2.	"Kappal Paatu"	Anwar Ali	Shahabaz Aman	Shahabaz Aman	09:03
3.	"Maravi"	Anwar Ali	K	Biju Narayanan, K	03:41
Total length:					17:05

== Release ==
=== Theatrical ===
Thuramukham was scheduled for worldwide theatrical release in summer 2021 but was postponed due to the rising number of COVID-19 cases in Kerala. but was postponed again, to avoid the clash with Mohanlal starrer Marakkar: Arabikadalinte Simham which released on 2 December 2021. Later, the film was announced to be released on 24 December 2021 during the festival time of Christmas but was again postponed. The film was postponed yet again after being scheduled to be released on 7 January 2022. The film was finally released in theatres on 10 March 2023.

=== Marketing ===
On 13 May 2021, the makers released the first teaser trailer.

== Reception ==
Anna Mathews, a critic of The Times of India, gave 3 out of 5 stars and wrote that "Director Rajeev Ravi infuses his usual atmospheric heft to the film". Anandu Suresh, critic of The New Indian Express, stated that "But for those who enjoy the slow pace, this movie is unquestionably a gem", and gave 4 out 5 stars. The Hindu critic S.R.Praveen wrote that "Rajeev Ravi’s film is an important document of the struggles to unionise for rights". Firstpost critic wrote that "Thuramukham is, nevertheless, significant for playing spoilsport in a world where it is the eternal goal of oppressors to ensure that their stories are never told by those with empathy for the oppressed", and gave 2.75 rating out of 5. Princy Alexander, critic of Onmanorama, stated that "The narration is slow-paced and jerky at times." The Quint critic gave 3 stars out of 5, in a review headlined "Rajeev Ravi & Nivin Pauly Mount a Strong Film on Communism". OTTplay critic gave 3.5 out of 5 and wrote that "The powerful performances and the electrifying ending make it an engrossing watch."

== Accolades ==
Awards associated with Thuramukham
Year	Award	Category	Recipient	Result	Ref.
2021	Kerala State Film Awards	Best Actor	Joju George (Note: Co-winner with Biju Menon; Won for performances in Madhuram, Freedom Fight, Thuramukham and Naayaattu)	Won	
2021	Kerala State Film Awards	Best Art Director	A. V. Gokuldas	Won	
