= Thondimuthalum Driksakshiyum =

- Poster
- Directed by: Dileesh Pothan
- Written by: Screenplay: Sajeev Pazhoor; Dialogues : Syam Pushkaran
- Story by: Sajeev Pazhoor
- Produced by: Sandip Senan; Anish M. Thomas
- Starring: Fahadh Faasil; Suraj Venjaramoodu; Nimisha Sajayan
- Cinematography: Rajeev Ravi
- Edited by: Kiran Das
- Music by: Bijibal
- Production company: Urvasi Theatres
- Distributed by: Urvasi Theatres; Tricolor Entertainment
- Release date: 30 June 2017 (India)
- Running time: 135 minutes
- Country: India
- Language: Malayalam
- Budget: ₹65 million

Thondimuthalum Driksakshiyum (transl. The mainour and the witness) is a 2017 Indian Malayalam-language crime drama film directed by Dileesh Pothan and written by Sajeev Pazhoor. The film stars Fahadh Faasil, Suraj Venjaramoodu, and Nimisha Sajayan in lead roles, with Alencier Ley Lopez, Vettukili Prakash, and Sibi Thomas in supporting roles. Syam Pushkaran served as a creative director of the film. Bijibal composed the music and Rajeev Ravi handled the cinematography.

Thondimuthalum Driksakshiyum was produced on a budget of ₹65 million. The film was released on 30 June 2017 in Kerala. It was a critical and commercial success, grossing ₹500.3 million at the Kerala box office alone. The Hindu included the film in their "Top 5 Malayalam movies in 2017" and "The 25 best Malayalam films of the decade".

The film won three National Film Awards, two Kerala State Film Awards, four Filmfare Awards South, three South Indian International Movie Awards, eight Asianet Film Awards, six CPC Cine Awards, four Vanitha Film Awards, three Kerala Film Critics Association Awards, two Asiavision Awards and one award at International Film Festival of Kerala.

== Plot ==
The story follows Sreeja and Prasad, a newly married couple from Cherthala, but living in Kasaragod due to the opposition of their inter-caste marriage by Sreeja's family. While riding a bus, Sreeja's gold nuptial chain is stolen, then swallowed by the thief. Sreeja alerts the other passengers, who beat the suspect and turn him in to the police.

When questioned by police, the thief gives his name as Prasad, the same as Sreeja's husband, but does not produce any identification. He claims to work in a hotel at Mangalore and repeatedly denies having stolen the chain. The other Prasad (her husband) explains that they were planning to sell the chain for funds to drill a borewell on their land, and start a tobacco farm. The police privately contemplate dropping the case due to the thief's lack of ID, but decide against it, as the incident happened in public. ASI Chandran asks Sreeja for her testimony, which he downplays to show her that the grounds are too weak to register a complaint. He suggests that they keep the thief at the station overnight, until he passes the chain, and the couple agrees. While sending Sreeja on a bus back home, Prasad offends her by saying that she should have been more careful.

Prasad stays at the police station to watch the thief, who seems carefree: He eats happily and enjoys the inauguration of a neighboring temple. The next morning, the police accompany the thief to the toilet but don't find the chain in his feces. An x-ray confirms the chain is still in his stomach, prompting the police to register an FIR against him.

Meanwhile, ASI Chandran asks Sreeja and Prasad to exaggerate their case against the thief, which the thief would later realize. The next morning, escorted again to the toilet, the thief attempts to escape. Police chase him through a solar farm—but the husband Prasad catches him. They struggle at a canal before the thief is apprehended by police. He is returned to the police station, where he claims that ASI Chandran had told him to escape, and to leave the chain at a bus stop. Another x-ray is taken, revealing that the chain is gone. Realizing his job is in danger, ASI Chandran replaces the original gold chain with another, to settle the matter. He asks Sreeja to play along in a bid to charge the thief.

Complying, Sreeja signs a document the next day, falsely affirming that the substituted chain is hers. However, the thief convinces Sreeja and Prasad to tell the court that the chain is not theirs, and he reveals that he actually left the chain near the canal. Prasad searches that area, eventually finding the original gold chain.

The thief, now free, writes a thank you note to Sreeja, presumably for telling the truth which freed him. ASI Chandran is shown spending time with his grandchildren, suggesting that he took an early retirement. Sreeja and Prasad celebrate when they find water in their borewell: Their tobacco farm is now ready.

== Cast ==
- Fahadh Faasil as Prasad, a thief.
- Suraj Venjaramoodu as Prasad, the farmer
- Nimisha Sajayan as Sreeja (voice over by Srinda Arhaan)
- Alencier Ley Lopez as ASI Chandran
- Vettukili Prakash as Sreekandan, Sreeja's father
- Mini K. S. as Sreeja's mother
- Sibi Thomas as SI SHO Sajan Mathew
- Unnimaya Prasad as Thaatha, the woman in the bus
- Srikant Murali as Murali
- SCPO Sadhanandan as CPO Sadanadhan
- P. Sivadas as Station Writer
- K. T. Sudhakaran as Sudhakaran
- Shahi Kabir as Shahi
- K. T. Balachandran as Babu Sir
- Unniraj Chervathur as Rajesh Ambalathara
- Aravindan as Faizal
- Sarath Kovilakam as Sarath
- Shince Mathew

== Production ==
Pazhoor initially thought of directing the film himself, before Pothan came on board. About the genre of the film, Pothan said that he is not sure which genre the film falls in, but it has the elements of a "family drama". For some of the police roles, the film features real-life police officers in the cast. Newcomer Nimisha Sajayan was selected from general auditions. Principal photography commenced from 7 December 2016 in Kasaragod. Other locations include Vaikom and Cherthala.

== Music ==
Thondimuthalum Driksakshiyum

Soundtrack album by Bijibal
- Released: 28 June 2017
- Recorded: 2017
- Genre: Feature Film Soundtrack
- Length: 10:02
- Language: Malayalam
- Label: Muzik 247
- Producer: Bijibal

Bijibal chronology
Ramante Edanthottam (2017)	Thondimuthalum Driksakshiyum (2017)	Thrissivaperoor Kliptham (2017)

The music and background score for the film is composed by Bijibal, who has previously worked with Dileesh Pothan in Maheshinte Prathikaaram.

All tracks are written by Rafeeq Ahamed.

Track listing
No.	Title	Singer(s)	Length
1.	"Kannile Poika"	Ganesh Sundaram, Soumya Ramakrishnan	3:16
2.	"Aayilyam"	Sithara, Govind Menon	3:07
3.	"Varum Varum"	Bijibal	3:39
Total length:			10:02

== Release ==
Thondimuthalum Driksakshiyum was released in India on 30 June 2017.

== Reception ==
=== Critical reception ===
Critic Veeyen noted that sardonic wisecracks and continuous cackles carry the charm of an otherwise unexciting film and praised its intelligent, gracefully flowing narrative.

Bharadwaj, in his review of the film, stated that "Fahadh Faasil's equal parts lazy and wily trickster acting and Alencier Ley Lopez's character acting as luminously exceptional." He praises the beauty of police office politics that Dileesh and Sajeev were able to portray as the drive that calibrates the film. Manorama praises real-life police officer Sibi Thomas for his comedic and yet balanced performance.

Baradwaj Rangan of Film Companion South wrote "Simply put, Pothan's films aren't about the incidents suggested by the titles, but around them. Instead of zooming in, narratively speaking, he goes for the wide shot. This is a generous approach to filmmaking. It says that the main characters are a part of the world around them, and this world needs to be acknowledged as well."

Director Shekhar Kapur, jury chairman of 65th National Film Awards commented: "Brilliant film, impressive performance. First you will think it is a simple film with usual romance and elopement. But how subtle are the things introduced in the film? The movie takes a serious turn by the end, leaving you appalled. I have never seen such an excellent performance by actors."

=== Box office ===
Thondimuthalum Driksakshiyum earned ₹50 million in its opening weekend and ₹173 million in Kerala over 50 days. It ultimately grossed ₹175 million from the Kerala box office, marking a commercial success.
