= Right to recall laws in India =

Mechanisms for removal of public servants

"Right To Recall (RTR)" are existing laws in some states of India that allow citizens to remove or replace public servants holding posts of Sarpanch, Mukhiya, Corporator and Mayor in the government.

== History ==
In modern India, Sachindra Nath Sanyal was the first to demand the right to replace public servants. The manifesto of the Hindustan Republican Association was written by Sachindra Nath Sanyal some when in December 1924. In his manifesto it's written that, "In this Republic the electors shall have the right to recall their representatives, if so desired, otherwise the democracy shall become a mockery."

The debate over Recall of elected representatives has a long history in the Indian democracy; the matter was even discussed in the Constituent Assembly. The debate was centered on the belief that the Right to Recall must accompany the Right to Elect and the voters must be provided with a remedy 'if things go wrong'. However Dr. B.R. Ambedkar did not accept this amendment.

While some members believed that Recall would help in political education of the people and would encourage voters to think, others argued that it would be improper to provide a Recall provision at the infancy of the Indian democracy. It was felt that Recall would render the constituencies a battleground between candidates and unnecessarily make them victims of political rivalry.

"If there are any stray instances or some black sheep who having lost the confidence of their constituency still want to continue to represent the constituency in the House, for some such bad instances we should not disfigure our Constituency. We should leave it as it is, to the good sense of the members concerned" Sardar Vallabh bhai Patel on 18 July while discussing proposed amendment on power to recall in Constituent Assembly Debates.

At the same time, however, some members feared that village or municipal level bodies could become autocratic in absence of No Confidence Motion or Recall.

The first recall law came as a provision of No confidence motion over Sarpanch by Gram Sabha members in Uttar Pradesh in 1947.

== States having recall laws at panchayat level ==
Recall has been implemented at Panchayat level in the states of Uttar Pradesh, Uttarakhand, Bihar, Jharkhand, Madhya Pradesh, Chhattisgarh, Maharashtra and Himachal Pradesh Recall has been implemented at Panchayat level in the states of Punjab since 1994 as provision of no confidence motion. Right To Recall Sarpanch is also recently passed for Haryana.

The procedure of Recall over Sarpanch is a 2 step procedure which can be directly initiated by the citizens. After a lock-in period of 1–2 years varying from state to state, certain number of voters of the Gram Sabha need to submit their signatures / thumbprints and petition the Collector office. After verification of the signatures, a meeting of all the Gram Sabha members is organized and if majority of the Gram Sabha votes against the sitting Sarpanch, the Sarpanch is removed.

== Failure of influence of right to recall laws at panchayat level ==
Right to Recall has been in vogue in Uttar Pradesh since 1947 and in Madhya Pradesh for over a decade now but not exercised much at Gram Panchayats level, due to lack of awareness.

In spite of villagers in these states having direct power to remove their Sarpanch, the corruption done by Sarpanch of these states is high and widespread.

== States having recall laws at municipal level ==
Recall has been implemented at Municipal level in the states of Madhya Pradesh, Chhattisgarh, Bihar, Jharkhand and Rajasthan.

== Right to recall proposed bills for MP and MLA ==
Constitution (Amendment) Bill about Voter's right to recall elected representatives was introduced in Lok Sabha by C. K. Chandrappan in 1974 and Atal Bihari Vajpayee had supported this but the bill did not pass.

This Right has been opposed by Election Commission of India and debated and highlighted in Indian politics.

A private member bill, The Representation of the People (Amendment) Bill, 2016 was introduced by Varun Gandhi in Lok Sabha.

== Campaign for right to recall laws on PM and CM ==
Rahul Chimanbhai Mehta an IIT Delhi graduate, activist and politician of India started first draft based campaign for right to recall laws on Prime Minister and Chief minister posts in India in 1999 after returning from United States. He proposed written drafts for recall of PM and CM in his book Vote Vapasi Dhan Vapasi. He floated a group named right to recall group in 2006 and started contesting elections to promote his drafts.

After 3 years of formation of Right to Recall group, Mehta want to form a political party to give more publicity to his proposed drafts by using election as a tool and in 2019 he founded Right to Recall Party and became its national president. Mehta had contested various elections from Gandhinagar loksabha constituency and Ghatlodia assembly constituency to promote his drafts.

== See also ==
- Recall election
