= Rajeev Ravi =

Indian cinematographer

- Education: Film and Television Institute of India, Pune
- Occupations: Cinematographer; director
- Years active: 1998–present
- Spouse: Geetu Mohandas (m. 2009)
- Awards: National Film Award for Best Cinematography (2013)

Rajeev Ravi is an Indian cinematographer, director, and producer from Kochi, Kerala. He's best known for his work in Hindi and Malayalam films. After graduating from Film and Television Institute of India, Pune in 1997, he started his career by assisting in the Malayalam film, Pranayavarnangal (1998) shot by Santosh Thundiyil. He debuted as a cinematographer with the film Chandni Bar (2001), when he was launched by producer R. Mohan (GoodKnight Mohan) when the original cinematographer Venu had date clashes. The film was directed by Madhur Bhandarkar.

Ravi is known for his collaborations with director Anurag Kashyap and his wife, former actress and director Geetu Mohandas. They have collaborated in several commercial and art films in Hindi cinema. In 2012, he co-produced the Hindi feature film I.D. The film premiered in the Busan International Film Festival in South Korea. Ravi won the 2010 Filmfare Award for Best Cinematography for Anurag Kashyap's Dev.D. In 2013, he received the National Film Award for Best Cinematography for Liar's Dice directed by his wife Geetu Mohandas.

Rajeev made his debut as a director with the Malayalam film Annayum Rasoolum (2013). Rajeev Ravi's second feature film, Njan Steve Lopez was released in 2014. In March 2016, Ravi completed filming of Kammatipaadam, starring Dulquer Salman, which was released on 20 May 2016.

== Awards ==
Year	Award category	Work
2014	National Film Award for Best Cinematography	Liar's Dice
2010	Filmfare Award for Best Cinematography	Dev D

== Filmography ==
=== As cinematographer ===
Year	Film	Language	Notes
2001	Chandni Bar	Hindi	
2002	Sesham	Malayalam	
2003	The Bypass	Silent	Short film
2003	Anyar	Malayalam	
2003	Chakram	Malayalam	
2004	Jana	Tamil	
2004	Rasikan	Malayalam	
2004	Quotation	Malayalam	
2006	Palak	Hindi	
2006	Classmates	Malayalam	
2007	No Smoking	Hindi	
2008	Haal–e–dil	Hindi	
2009	Seetha Kalyanam	Malayalam	
2009	Mumbai Cutting	Hindi	
2009	Dev.D	Hindi	Won Filmfare Award for Best Cinematography
2009	Gulaal	Hindi	
2009	99	Hindi	
2011	That Girl in Yellow Boots	Hindi; English	
2012	Ivan Megharoopan	Malayalam	
2012	Gangs of Wasseypur - Part 1	Hindi	
2012	Gangs of Wasseypur - Part 2	Hindi	
2013	Bombay Talkies	Hindi; English	Segment - Murabba
2013	5 Sundarikal	Malayalam	Segment - Gauri
2013	Monsoon Shootout	Hindi	
2014	Liar's Dice	Hindi	Won National Film Award for Best Cinematography
2015	Bombay Velvet	Hindi	
2016	Udta Punjab	Hindi	
2017	Thondimuthalum Driksakshiyum	Malayalam	
2017	Mukkabaaz	Hindi	
2018	Naa Peru Surya	Telugu	
2019	Virus	Malayalam	
2019	Moothon	Malayalam; Hindi	Bilingual film
2019	Gaadi	Sinhala	
2021	Bell Bottom	Hindi	
2022	Thuramukham	Malayalam	Also director
2022	Cuttputlli	Hindi	
2023	Selfiee	Hindi	
2023	Paradise	English; Sinhala; Malayalam; Tamil	
2024	Maharaj	Hindi	
2025	Oka Padhakam Prakaram	Telugu	
2026	Toxic	Kannada; English	Bilingual film

=== As director ===
Year	Film	Notes
2013	Annayum Rasoolum	Debut film
2014	Njan Steve Lopez	
2016	Kammatipaadam	
2022	Kuttavum Shikshayum	
2023	Thuramukham	

=== As co-producer ===
- I.D. (2012) - Hindi
- Kismath (2016) - Malayalam
- Eeda (2018) - Malayalam
- Aabhaasam (2018)- Malayalam
- Moothon (2019)- Malayalam/Hindi
