= Alencier Ley Lopez =

Indian Actor

- Born: 11 December 1965 (age 60); Puthenthope, Thiruvananthapuram, India
- Education: University of Kerala
- Occupations: Film actor; television actor; theatre actor
- Years active: 1997–present
- Spouse: Suseela George
- Children: 2

Alencier Ley Lopez is an Indian film and theatre actor, who appears in Malayalam films. Lopez made his debut in the 1998 film Daya; and he worked in films like Annayum Rasoolum (2013), Njan Steve Lopez (2013), and Maheshinte Prathikaaram (2016).

== Personal life ==
Alencier Ley Lopez is from a Latin Catholic family from Puthenthope, a coastal village in Thiruvananthapuram, Kerala. He graduated from St. Xavier's College, Thumba and University College Thiruvananthapuram. Alencier is married to Suseela George, a mathematics teacher. The couple has two sons– Alen Savio Lopez and Alen Steve Lopez.

== Acting career ==
=== Early years in theatre ===
Lopez developed a passion for theatre early in life after witnessing the Leyon Lopez Nadakaolsavam (theatre festival). His theatre debut was at the age of five. Later Lopez and some friends formed their own troupe – the Netaji Theatre, directing and acting in their own plays. After graduating school Lopez decided to chase a career as an actor or a priest. In college he partnered with various theatre troupes such as C. P. Krishnakumar's troupe, Kavalam Narayana Panicker's Sopanam and K. Raghu's Natakayogam. He continued his career in theatre until the platforms of performance arts were taken over by scene platforms film and television. He has also acted in Nokketha doorathu TV serial on Mazhavil Manorama.

=== Films ===
Lopez was introduced to films by cinematographer-director Venu in his directorial debut Daya in 1998. He played one of the leads in K. R. Manoj's Kanyaka Talkies (2013), which was screened in major film festivals and received critical applause. Then in Vedivazhipadu (2013), as a typical south Kerala Brahmin. In 2013, director Rajeev Ravi cast him in Annayum Rasoolum starring Fahadh Faasil and later in Njan Steve Lopez (2014). In 2015, Lopez starred in Maheshinte Prathikaaram (2015) at the recommendation of Faasil, which became his first major break. In 2017, he did a role in the film Thondimuthalum Drisakhsiyum, directed by Dileesh Pothan.

== Controversy ==
Actress Divya Gopinath alleged that Lopez sexually harassed her on the set of his film Aabhaasam. The director of Aabhaasam claimed that Lopez came to the set drunk and messed up many of the shots which affected the shooting. Another American woman claimed that Lopez harassed her while he was in the United States filming for Monsoon Mangoes.

== Filmography ==
Key
†	Denotes films that have not yet been released

- All films are in Malayalam language unless otherwise noted.

Year	Title	Role	Notes
1998	Daya		Uncredited role
2000	Sayahnam		Uncredited role
2001	Jagapoga	Psychiatrist	
2003	Margham		Uncredited role
2003	Pattanathil Sundaran		Uncredited role
2008	Pakal Nakshatrangal		Uncredited role
2008	Kannerinu Madhuram		Uncredited role
2009	Raamanam	Villager	
2012	Ustad Hotel	Food Safety Officer	
2013	Annayum Rasoolum	Basheer	
2013	Kanyaka Talkies	Yakhoob	
2013	Vedivazhipadu	Swami	
2014	Njan Steve Lopez	George Lopez	
2014	Jalamsham		
2015	Love 24x7	Kabani's uncle	
2016	Monsoon Mangoes	Bombay Pathrose	
2016	Maheshinte Prathikaaram	Baby	
2016	Kali	FD Customer	
2016	Kammatipaadam	Mathai	
2016	Kasaba	Thankachan	
2016	Kismath	Sayed Bawa Thangal	
2016	Guppy	Paappan	
2016	Thoppil Joppan	Pappiyachan	
2016	Mundrothuruth		
2017	Munthirivallikal Thalirkkumbol	Jacobettan	
2017	Ezra	Moosa	
2017	Take Off	Sameera's father	
2017	Rakshadhikari Baiju Oppu	Surendran	
2017	Comrade in America	Politician	
2017	Thondi Muthalum Driksakshiyum	A.S.I. Chandran	
2017	Sarvopari Palakkaran	Mani Chacko	
2017	Tarangam	Ittymani	
2017	Udaharanam Sujatha	PC George	
2017	Velipadinte Pusthakam	Vareethettan	
2017	Parava		
2017	Goodalochana	Das	
2017	Hadiya		
2017	Y	Sub Inspector	
2017	Mayaanadhi		
2017	Randuper		
2017	Vimaanam	Roger	
2018	Eeda	Govindan	
2018	Rosapoo	Venugopal Menon	
2018	Kala Viplavam Pranayam	Alikkal Ahammed Sahib	
2018	Ira	Chandi	
2018	Parole	Philipose	
2018	Btech	Seyid Ali	
2018	Aabhaasam	Bus Driver	
2018	Ente Mezhuthiri Athazhangal	Itty Chandy/T.K Alexander	
2018	Mangalyam Thanthunanena	Prof. Kuruvi	
2018	Oru Kuprasidha Payyan	Bhaskaran	
2019	Ottam	Chachappan	
2019	Aanenkilum Allenkilum		
2019	Moothon		Hindi-Malayalam Bilingual
2019	Puzhikkadakan	Koshy	
2019	Prathi Poovankozhi	Gopi	
2020	Paapam Cheyyathavar Kalleriyatte	Xavier	
2021	Chathur Mukham	Clement	
2021	One	Kuriakose, Minister for Revenue	
2021	Cold Case	Chandrabhanu	
2021	Djibouti		
2022	Salute	Maraar	
2022	Pathonpatham Noottandu	Chandrakkaran Raman Thampi	
2022	Kuttavum Shikshayum	SI Basheer	
2022	Appan	Ittychan	
2022	Kaduva	Varkey Sir	
2022	Naalam Mura	Subair	
2023	Laika	Dog's voice	voice acted
2023	Within Seconds	Kalan Thambi	
2023	Kolla	Stephen	
2023	Voice of Sathyanathan	SP Koshy Pothen	
2024	Iyer In Arabia		
2024	Golam	CI Rahim	
2024	Grrr	Thampi Himagiri	
2024	Ullozhukku	George	
2024	Vettaiyan	Combined Courts Judge	Tamil film
2024	Njan Kandatha Sare		
2025	Am Ah	CI Abhraham	
2025	Narayaneente Moonnaanmakkal	Vishwanathan	
2025	Pongala		
2026	Koodothram		
2026	Ankam Attahasam		

== Awards ==
- 2017: Kerala State Film Award for Best Character Actor : Thondimuthalum Driksakshiyum
- 2017: Filmfare Award for Best Supporting Actor – Malayalam : Thondimuthalum Driksakshiyum
- 2017: Flowers Indian Film Awards - Best Supporting actor: Thondimuthalum Driksakshiyum
- 2017: CPC Cine Awards 2017- Best Character artist: Thondimuthalum Driksakshiyum
- 2018: Asianet Film Awards 2018 - Best Supporting actor: Thondimuthalum Driksakshiyum
- 2022: Kerala Film Critics Association Award for Best Supporting Actor: Appan
- 2023: Kerala State Film Awards for Special Mention: Appan
- 2024: Filmfare Critics Award for Best Actor – Malayalam: Appan
