= Padmaraj Ratheesh =

Indian actor

- Born: 1989 (age 36–37); Thiruvananthapuram, Kerala, India
- Other name: Pappan
- Occupation: Actor
- Years active: 2015–present
- Parent(s): Ratheesh (Father); Diana (Mother)
- Relatives: M.K. Hemachandran (Grandfather); Parvathy Ratheesh(Sister); Padma Ratheesh(Sister); Pranav Ratheesh(Brother)

Padmaraj Ratheesh (born 1989) is an Indian actor who appears in Malayalam films. He is the son of the late popular Malayalam actor, Ratheesh. His sister Parvathy Ratheesh is also an actress.

He made his cinematic debut with Deepu Karunakaran's Fireman (2015) in which he played a negative role. Then he starred in G. Marthandan's directorial Acha Dhin.

== Personal life ==
Padmaraj was born to actor Ratheesh and Diana. He has an elder sister Parvathy, younger sister Padma and a younger brother Pranav. Padmaraj graduated with a Bachelor of Business Management degree and was working as a floor manager in a retail company at Coimbatore for a couple of years before he quit to look after his ailing mother. His elder sister Parvathy has also stepped into the film industry and acted as the lead heroine opposite Kunchacko Boban in director Sugeeth's movie Madhura Naranga.

== Film career ==
Padmaraj made his debut in Fireman (2015), which he played a negative role opposite to Mammootty. His second film was Acha Dhin and also collaborating second time with Mammootty. He got a golden opportunity of starring with Mammootty, Mohanlal, Madhu, Biju Menon, Nivin Pauly, Sunny Wayne, Unni Mukundan and Manju Warrier within his first 10 films.

== Filmography ==
Year	Title	Role	Notes
2015	Fireman	Prisoner	Debut Film
2015	Acha Dhin	Muneer	
2016	Karinkunnam 6S	Mousin	
2016	Dum	Kishor	
2017	1971: Beyond Borders	Commando	
2017	Rakshadhikari Baiju Oppu	Chandran	
2018	Parole		
2018	Theetta Rappai	Thommikunju	
2018	Kayamkulam Kochunni	Jewish Trader	
2019	Thenkashikattu		
2019	Soothrakkaran	CI Harish Kurup	
2019	Vishudha Pusthakam		
2021	Illam	Bhadran Thampuran	
2021	Neeravam		
2021	Kaaval	Fr. David Varghese	
2021	Bheeshma Parvam	Abda	
2022	Heaven	DYSP Kishore	
2023	Antony	Johnykkutty	
2024	DNA	DYSP Aanand Raj	
2024	Pushpaka Vimanam		
2026	Disco †	TBA	
