= Rameshbabu =

Rameshbabu is a patronymic. Some people with this patronymic include:

- Praggnanandhaa Rameshbabu (born 2005), a chess prodigy from Chennai, Tamil Nadu, India
- Vaishali Rameshbabu (born 2001), a chess player from Chennai, and elder sister of the above

== See also ==
- Ghattamaneni Ramesh Babu (1965 – 2022), a Telugu actor and filmmaker from Chennai
- Meenakshi Rameshbabu, who appeared in Melle (film)
- Rameshbabu Donepudi, who was elected in the 1994 Andhra Pradesh Legislative Assembly election
