= Anup Pandalam =

Indian film director, screenwriter and actor

Anup M J
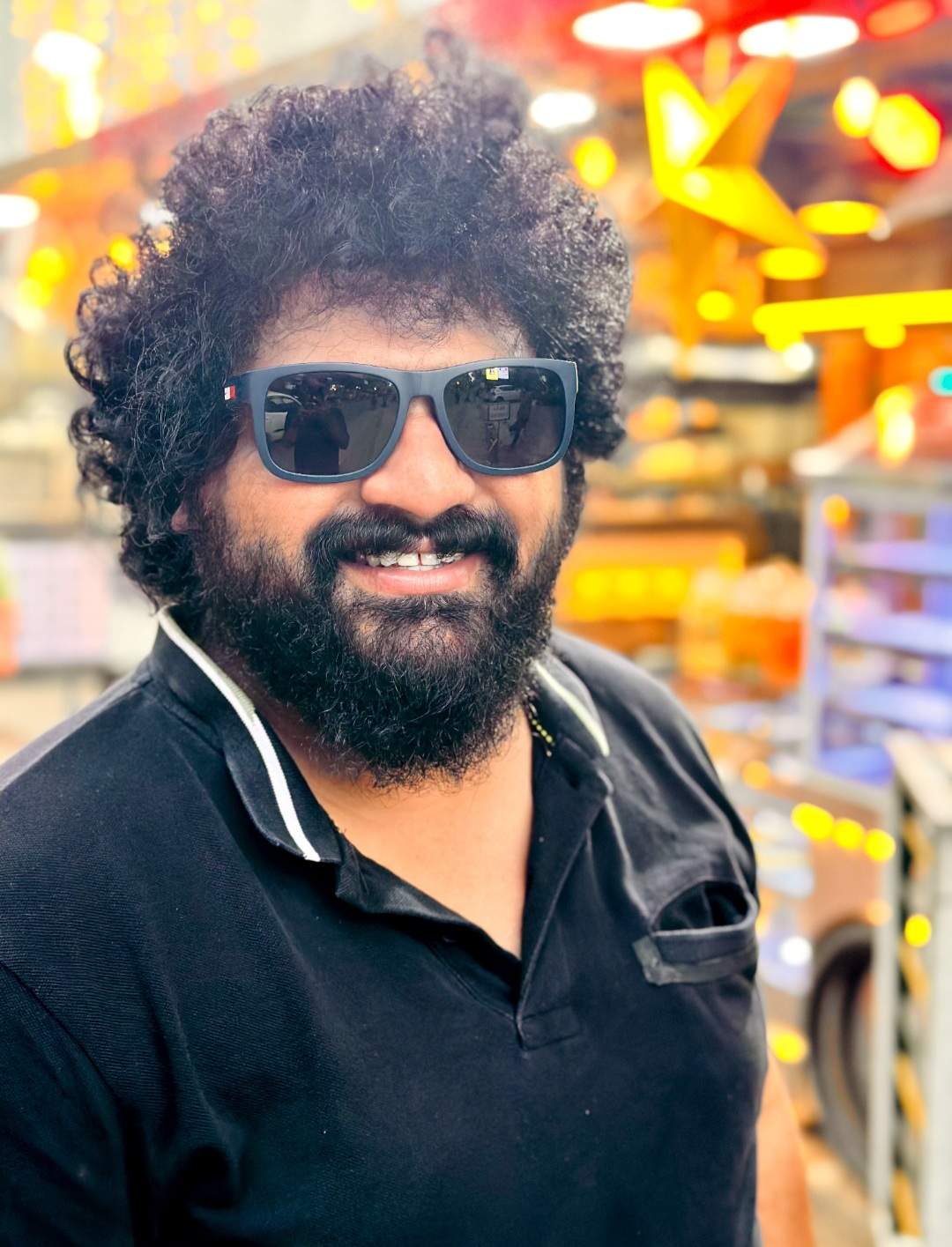
- Occupations: Film director; Screenwriter; Actor
- Years active: 2012–present

Anup Pandalam is an Indian film director, screenwriter and actor who predominantly works in the Malayalam film industry. His debut feature film was Sakhavu (2017) starring Nivin Pauly. He is also known for directing, writing and acting in the critically acclaimed film Shefeekkinte Santhosham (2022) starring Unni Mukundan.

== Early life ==
Before being an independent director and film writer, he has worked as an actor for films such as Sakhavu (2017) as Benny starring Nivin Pauly, Member Rameshan 9aam Ward (2022) as Bijithan starring Arjun Ashokan, Aaha (2021) as Sinu starring Indrajith Sukumaran, Amith Chakalakkal etc.

== Career ==
During December 2020, a dispute arose between actor Bala and Unni Mukundan from Anup's debut directorial film Shefeekkinte Santhosham. Technicians claimed they had not been paid, while only female artists who participated in the film received payment. Anup responded in a Facebook post, stating that he received his fee and believed others did too. He also clarified that Bala's involvement in Shefeekkinte Santhosham came through the lead actor Unni Mukundan's recommendation.

== Filmography ==
=== As actor ===
Year	Title	Role	Notes
2017	Sakhavu	Benny	Debut film
2021	Aaha	Sinu	
2022	Member Rameshan 9aam Ward	Bijithan	
2022	Shefeekkinte Santhosham	Noushad	

=== As Director ===
Year	Title	Actors	Notes
2022	Shefeekkinte Santhosham	Unni Mukundan, Divya Pillai	

== Television ==
He has also worked as program producer and host for the prank show Gulumaal in Surya TV.
