= Parvathy Ratheesh =

Indian actress

- Occupation: Actor
- Years active: 2015–2018
- Spouse: Milu Mani Manghat (m. 2017)
- Parents: Ratheesh; Diana Ratheesh
- Relatives: Padmaraj Ratheesh (brother); Pranav Ratheesh (brother); Padma Ratheesh (sister)

Parvathy Ratheesh is an Indian actress who works in the Malayalam cinema. She is also the daughter of the late popular veteran Malayalam actor, Ratheesh who has acted in numerous successful films in late 1970s.

== Personal life ==
Parvathy Ratheesh was born to Ratheesh and Diana Ratheesh as the first child in their family. Parvathy has two younger brothers including the current Malayalam actor, Padmaraj Ratheesh and Pranav Ratheesh along with a younger sister, Padma Ratheesh.

On 6 September 2017 she married Milu Mani Manghat, an officer at Emirates NBD. The wedding took place at a hotel in Kozhikode.

== Career ==
Parvathy Ratheesh made her film acting debut in 2015 similar to that of her younger brother, Padmaraj Ratheesh who also made his acting debut in the same year through Fireman. Parvathy made her debut with the film, Madhura Naranga in which she played a breakthrough role as a Sri Lankan Tamil girl as it helped the film to gain positive reviews at the box office.

She also made a cameo appearance as a journalist in the 2016 film, Kochavva Paulo Ayyappa Coelho as a journalist before went onto to play a lead role in the 2017 horror comedy film, Lechmi. Parvathy Ratheesh also got the opportunity to act as the daughter of the veteran Malayalam actor, Sreenivasan for the film Kallai FM in which she played the role of a flower seller.

== Filmography ==
| Year | Film | Role | Notes |
|---|---|---|---|
| 2015 | Madhura Naranga | Thamara | Debut film |
| 2016 | Kochavva Paulo Ayyappa Coelho | RJ Soumya | Cameo appearance |
| 2017 | Lechmi | Lechmi | |
| 2017 | Vaakku | Aparna | |
| 2018 | Kallai FM | Saira Banu | |
