= Rani (2023 Malayalam film) =

Indian Malayalam film

- Directed by: Nizamudeen Nazar
- Story by: Manis Divakar
- Produced by: Binu Christopher; Abdul Rasheed
- Starring: Biju Sopanam; Shivani Menon; Maqbool Salmaan
- Cinematography: Aravind Unni
- Music by: Rahul Raj Thottathil
- Production company: Magic Mango Film Studio
- Distributed by: Balagovindam Media
- Release date: 23 October 2023
- Country: India
- Language: Malayalam

Rani is a 2023 Indian Malayalam film directed by Nizamudeen Nazar featuring Biju Sopanam, Shivani Menon and Maqbool Salmaan in lead roles.

== Cast ==
- Biju Sopanam as Vasu
- Shivani Menon as Rani
- Maqbool Salmaan
- Jayan Cherthala
- Kulappulli Leela
- Aromal B. S.
- Renjan Dev
- Ansal Pulluruthy
- Riyas Pathan
- Jensan Alappat
- Dasettan Kozhikode
- Sreedev Puthed
- Akhil Varghese
- Salim Pulluruthy
- Bineesh Wayanad
- Ashin Shaji
- Ansil Sulthan
- Benny Varghese
- Saidhu Muhammed
- Ratheesh Chemmad
- Deepika Mandate
- Smitha Mahesh
- Rithin Simon
- Aryan Unni

== Production ==
This is the second time that Biju Sopanam and Shivani Menon play father and daughter after the television serial Uppum Mulakum. As of January 2023, the shooting for the film has been completed. Despite the presence of another film titled Rani, the makers of the film made no change to the film's title.

== Reception ==
A critic from Times Now rated the film 3/5 and wrote, "While Rani effectively tackles moral dilemmas and justice, some viewers might find certain aspects of the plot predictable. However, the film compensates with strong character development and a thought-provoking exploration of right versus wrong".
