= Al Sabith =

Indian film and television actor

- Born: Kalanjoor Kerala, India
- Occupation: Actor
- Years active: 2013 – present

Al Sabith is an Indian actor and TV host associated with the Malayalam film and television industry. He is best known for playing child character in the Flowers sitcom Uppum Mulakum.

== Career ==
Al Sabith appeared in front of the camera for the first time as an infant at the age of 2, for a Hindu devotional album where he enacted the role of Lord Ayyappan. After being part of few reality and chat shows, he was offered to do the role of Keshu in Uppum Mulakum serial telecasting in Flowers TV.

Al Sabith appeared in various TV awards shows as performer and television commercials for the brands like Asianet broadband, Gold FM, RK Wedding centre, Flowers 94.7 FM, Maple tune, flowers TV and many others.

After the success of Uppum Mulakum, he got numerous offers from film industry. In 2018, he acted in Sathyan Anthikkad’s film Njan Prakashan along with Fahadh Faasil and Sreenivasan.

He has also acted in Jayaram and Vijay Septhupathi starrer Markoni Mathai.

== Filmography ==
=== Films ===
Year	Film	Role	Notes	Ref.
2018	Njan Prakashan	Gopalji's son		
2019	Marconi Mathai	Young Mathai		
2019	Margamkali	Young Sachidanandan		
2019	Ennodu Para I Love You ennu	Irfaan		
2020	Maniyarayile Ashokan	Shyama's brother		

=== Television ===
Year	Program	Role	Channel	Notes
2013	Super Kids	Himself	Kairali TV	Kids chat show
2014-2015	Kuttykalavara	Himself	Flowers TV	Reality show
2015–present	Uppum Mulakum	Keshav "Keshu" Balachandran Thampi	Flowers TV	TV Sitcom
2016	Sreekandan Nair Show	Himself	Flowers TV	Talk show
2016	Comedy Super Night	Himself	Flowers TV	Talk show
2016	Comedy Super Night 2	Himself	Flowers TV	Talk show
2016	Balasuryan	Himself	Victers TV	Chat show
2017	Thenvarikkaa	Kuttan	YouTube	Short film
2017	Thattamitta Pennu	-	-	Music album
2018	Seetha	Keshu	Flowers TV	Special Appearance (Episode 412)
2019	Star Magic (Tamar Padar 2)	Himself	Flowers TV	
2022	Erivum Puliyum	Jo	Zee Keralam	
2025-present	Tom & Jessy	Jerry	Kaumudy TV	Romantic sitcom

== Awards ==
Mangalam TV Awards

- 2017 : Best child artist

Janmabhoomi Awards

- 2019 : Best child artist
