= Erivum Puliyum =

Indian sitcom

- Genre: Sitcom
- Inspired by: Uppum Mulakum
- Starring: Biju Sopanam; Nisha Sarangh; Rishi S Kumar; Juhi Rustagi; Al Sabith; Shivani Menon; Baby Ameya
- Country of origin: India
- Original language: Malayalam
- No. of episodes: 82

Production
- Producer: Zee Keralam Production

Original release
- Network: Zee Keralam
- Release: 17 January – 13 May 2022

Related
- Uppum Mulakum

Erivum Puliyum (transl. Spice and Sour) is an Indian Malayalam-language sitcom. The show premiered on 17 January 2022 on Zee Keralam. It is a spiritual reboot to the sitcom Uppum Mulakum that airs on Flowers TV.

Due to low TRP ratings and negative reviews from the audience, the show went off-air on 13 May 2022.

== Synopsis ==
It depicts events in the life of Freddie, his wife Julie and their five children named Jojo, Jani, Jo, Jenna and Cutie. When this family faces several ups and downs in their day-to-day lives, they make comical attempts to overcome their problems.

== Cast ==
Main cast

- Biju Sopanam as Freddie / Fredrick aka Unniyappan: Julie's husband and Jojo, Jani, Jo, Jenna and Cutie's father. Dual role as Keshavan, Freddie's Father.
- Nisha Sarangh as Julie / Juliette Wodzynski : Freddie's wife and Jojo, Jani, Jo, Jenna and Cutie's mother. Dual role as Elina D'Cruz(Elikutty), Julie's mother.
- Rishi S Kumar as Jojo/Julian Wodzynski: Julie and Freddie's first child. Jani, Jo, Jenna and Cutie's brother.
- Juhi Rustagi as Jani / Jannelle Wodzynski : Julie and Freddie's second child. Jojo, Jo, Jenna and Cutie's sister.
- Al Sabith as Jo / Jijoe / John Wodzynski : Julie and Freddie's third child. Jojo, Jani, Jenna and cutie's brother.
- Shivani Menon as Jenna or Jennifer Wodzynski: Julie and Freddie's fourth child. Jojo, Jani, Jo and Cutie's sister.
- Baby Ameya as Cutie or Jane Wodzynski : Julie and Freddie's fifth child. Jojo, Jani, Jo and Jenna's sister. She is a 4 years old.
- Binoj Kulathoor as Douglas : A servant in Julie and Freddie's house

Guest appearance

- Guinness Pakru as Himself

== Production ==
After first season of Uppum Mulakum stopped, Zee Keralam planned to make a similar show titled Erivum Puliyum. Initially it is aired as 4 days special show on the occasion of Onam from 20 August to 23 August 2021. On seeing it's reception, the channel decided to relaunch the show as a reboot of Uppum Mulakum from 17 January 2022 with same cast but changing the character names.
