= Nandini Nair =

Indian television personality

- Born: Thiruvalla, Kerala, India
- Occupations: Radio jockey; Disc jockey; TV anchor; Actor
- Years active: 2006 – present

Nandini Nair is an Indian television personality, talk show host, performer, television anchor, and a professional disc jockey and radio jockey under the stage name DJ Envy. She appears on her talk show Hello Namaste. She appeared in the film Aedan directed by Sanju Surendran.

== Early life ==
She started her profession in the industry working as a Video Jockey for Asianet Dubai. She has also been hosting shows in India and abroad. Before taking up Hello Namaste, a celebrity chat show, she was an RJ for about one and a half years. She is also a DJ. She was a resident DJ for Crowne Plaza Cochin and people nicknamed her as "DJ Lady Envy"

== Filmography ==
Year	Title	Role	Notes
2014	Samsaram Arogyathinu Hanikaram	TV Reporter	
2015	Waiting	Nurse Ann	
2015	Jamna Pyari	RJ Radhika	
2015	Love 24x7	Journalist	
2015	Premam	Nandini	
2015	Chirakodinja Kinavukal	News Reader	
2017	Alamara	Proposed lady	
2017	Lava Kusha	Shalini	
2017	Aedan	Neethu	
2019	Manoharam	Malathi	
2020	Kozhipporu	Chinjilu	
2020	Mariyam Vannu Vilakkoothi	Herself	
2020	Love etc (Web-series)	Sana	
2023	Amala	Amala	

=== Short films ===
Year	Film	Role	Director	Notes
2013	Ee Kalathu	Sandra	Malayalam	Jenith Kachappily
2016	Abhimukham	Nancy	Malayalam	B Govind Raj

== Television ==
Show	Channel	Role
Start Music Aradhyam Padum Season 2	Asianet	DJ Lady Envy
Immini Valya Naavu	Surya Comedy	Host
Immini Balya Oral	Surya Music	Judge
Prabha Pooram	Mazhavil Manorama	Host
Homeminister	Amrita TV	Host
Onavisheshangalumayi Ramesh Pisharody	Amrita TV	Host
Start Music Aaradhyam Paadum	Asianet	DJ Lady Envy
Enkile Ennodu Para	YouTube	Host
Be the Vj	Surya Music	Judge
Oru Vadakkan Veeram	Mazhavil Manorama	Host
Home Minister	Amrita TV	Co Host
Cinema Company	Kaumudy TV	Host
A Day with a Star	Kaumudy TV	Host
Prithviyde Oozham	Kaumudy TV	Host
Star Chat with Sunny Wayne	Kaumudy TV	Host
Mallu Arjun	Kaumudy TV	Host
Chirinkunnam 6's	Kaumudy TV	Host
Ponkani	Kaumudy TV	Host
Adi Kapyare Koottamani	24 News	Host
Get Set Chat	Kaumudy TV	Host
Students Only	Kairali TV	Host
Hello Namaste	Mazhavil Manorama	Host
Uppum Mulakum	Flowers TV	Actress
Uppile Mulak	Flowers TV	Host
