= Sakhavu (2017 film) =

- Theatrical release poster
- Directed by: Sidhartha Siva
- Written by: Sidhartha Siva
- Produced by: B. Rakesh
- Starring: Nivin Pauly; Aishwarya Rajesh; Aparna Gopinath
- Cinematography: George C. Williams
- Edited by: Bineesh Krishnan Vineeb Krishnan
- Music by: Prashant Pillai
- Production company: Universal Cinema
- Distributed by: Anto Joseph Film Company & Tricolor Entertainment
- Release date: 15 April 2017
- Running time: 164 minutes
- Country: India
- Language: Malayalam

Sakhavu (transl. Comrade) is a 2017 Indian Malayalam-language political drama film written and directed by Sidhartha Siva. It stars Nivin Pauly in dual roles, as a cunning student political leader (Krishnakumar), and a senior social activist and comrade (Sakhavu Krishnan) who fights for his left-wing ideals. Aishwarya Rajesh plays the female lead. The film was released on 14 April 2017 during Vishu holiday.

== Plot ==
Krishnakumar aka Kichu is a ruthless district-level youth wing leader of SFK, a political party. He plans to improve his position in the party by destroying the political career of other competitors in SFK. He arranges people to beat up his competitor, even though he is Kichu's close friend.

He gets a call from Kuriachan who is a leader of his political party. He tells Kichu to go to hospital and donate blood for a comrade as Kichu has the rare O Negative blood type. Kichu was forced to go to hospital but he tells his friend Mahesh that he will get the hell out of there without wasting his time. He makes a lot of mess at the hospital and tells the acquaintance of the recipient to get food for him. Kichu was thinking that the recipient was a lowly comrade but he was stunned to see even the chief minister paying a visit to see the wounded recipient. Now Kichu is eager to know about this so-called comrade and asks Prabhakaran (an acquaintance of comrade) about him.

Prabhakaran starts to tell the story of comrade Krishnan, the patient. Krishnan was a party member who was sent to Peerumedu by the party's Kottayam district committee to develop the party's influence there. Krishnan raised his voice against the poor wages given to workers at the tea estate but the manager of the estate was not interested in raising the wage. Krishnan led a strike with all the workers and the tea factory was forced to raise the wage. Krishnan's next move was against a Brahmin landlord. The landlord was giving labour to Tamil people for poor wage instead of Malayalis. Krishnan and his party talked to the landlord but he didn't negotiate. And the landlord didn't do the cultivation that year. Krishnan and workers started cultivating in the landlord's land and produced a good yield. They were ready to give the yield to the landlord at a condition that he should give them the proper wage. He was forced to accept.

Krishnan gave word to comrade Janaki's family that he would marry her. They got married after some events. After some years Krishnan had a stroke and got into partial paralysis. Then he learned that the old factory where they did their first strike was closed and workers are in poverty. Krishnan visited a rich man who had got many helps from him and asked him if he can buy that estate and start the factory. He accepted it at a request that Krishnan should be one among in the governing body of the factory. Krishnan accepted this and later learned that a young man Tony had captured some of the land in the estate. Krishnan ordered him to get his resort closed. Tony stabbed Krishnan at night to retain his resort and that's the story of Krishnan.

Kichu now learns that the way he is living is not the way a comrade should live. Krishnan's surgery was successful and all of them in the hospital was happy. Kichu hesitated to see Krishnan's face as he had cherished his personality in his heart. Kichu goes to peerumedu with his youth wing comrades and beats up Tony who stabbed Krishnan and he proclaims that Krishnan's legacy will be continued through them.

== Cast ==
- Nivin Pauly in a dual role as:
  - Sakhavu Krishnan
  - Krishnakumar (Kichu)
- Aishwarya Rajesh as Sakhavu Janaki
- Aparna Gopinath as Neethi
- Sreenivasan as Doctor
- Gayathri Suresh as Aishwarya
- Binu Pappu as Retired DYSP Prabhakaran Eeraali
- Althaf Salim as Mahesh
- Renji Panicker as Sakhavu Kuriyachan
- Maniyanpilla Raju as Rajan, Assistant Labour Officer
- Baiju as Garuda Kankaani
- Sudheesh as Sakhavu Daasan
- Premkumar as Party Secretary
- Rakendhu Kumar as Sakhavu Eldho
- Santhosh Keezhattoor as Sakhavu Senthil
- Musthafa as Sakhavu Basheer
- V. K. Prakash as Mathew
- Nishanth Sagar as Tony Manakkal
- Tony Luke Kocherry as 'The Manager'
- P. Balachandran as Kavalam Pattaru
- Sooraj S. Kurup as Rajeev
- Sreelakshmi as Krishnakumar's mother
- V. Suresh Thampanoor as Janaki's father
- Seema G. Nair as Janaki's mother
- Shelly Kishore as Maya
- Anjali Aneesh as Suja
- Aliyar as Sakhavu Baskaran
- Baiju V.K. as Special Police Officer
- Reshmi Boban as Headmistress
- Krishna Prasad as Advocate
- Chali Pala as Sub Inspector
- Anup Pandalam as Benny
- Kalabhavan Rahman as Thattukada owner
- Appunni Sasi as Waiter

== Soundtrack ==
The music was composed by Prashant Pillai.

Track listing
No.	Title	Lyrics	Singer(s)	Length
1.	"Aarariro"	Sidhartha Siva	Preeti Pillai	1:24
2.	"Lokam Ennum"	Anwar Ali	Bijibal, Niranj Suresh	3:38
3.	"Madhumatiye"	Shabareesh Varma	Shreekumar Vakkiyil, Preeti Pillai	3:32
4.	"Theyyum Thindaka"	Sooraj Kurup	Shreekumar Vakkiyil, Sreerag Saji	4:34
5.	"Udhichuyarnne"	Santhosh Varma	Sithara Krishnakumar, Vaikom Vijayalakshmi	3:30
Total length:				16:38

== Reception ==
A critic from The Times of India wrote that "The film has Nivin Pauly and his smart dialogues to entertain you, on and off. It's worth your money, but be prepared to bear quite a few stretched moments of storytelling as well". A critic from The Indian Express wrote that "Nivin's performances in three different avatars are the highlight of the Sakhavu. The comedy is a part of the natural course of the story, where every character in the film manages to draw a few laughs".

== Box office ==
The film collected ₹2.4 crore (US$250,000) on day-1 in Kerala box office. The film collected ₹9.95 lakhs from US box office and ₹6.94 lakhs from UK box office in its two weekends. The film grossed $196,175 from UAE box office in its two weekends. The Movie was a hit at the box office.
