= Lal Bahadur Shastri (film) =

- Directed by: Rejishh Midhila
- Written by: Rejishh Midhila
- Produced by: Jose Simon; Rajesh George
- Starring: Jayasurya; Aju Varghese; Nedumudi Venu; Sandra Simon
- Cinematography: Eldo Isaac
- Edited by: Sandeep Nandakumar
- Music by: Bijibal
- Release date: 21 November 2014
- Country: India
- Language: Malayalam

Lal Bahadur Shastri is a 2014 Indian Malayalam-language comedy film directed and scripted by Rejishh Midhila (in his directorial debut). The film is about three strangers who come together during their journey of life. It revolves around how they influence each other. It stars Jayasurya, Nedumudi Venu, and Aju Varghese in the title roles of Lal, Bahadur, and Shasthri, respectively, with débutante Sandra Simon in the female lead. The music is composed by Bijibal and the lyrics are penned by Santhosh Varma. The film is produced by Jose Simon and Rajesh George. Jayasurya's son Adwaith made his début in the film. He plays the childhood version of Jayasurya's character in the film.

== Plot ==
Lal is a simple, good-natured young man in search of a job. Bahadhur is a former panchayath president who has an obsession with liquor and women. Shasthri is a young farmer who struggles to get some document approved from the Government sector.

The three men, who are total strangers, travel to Ernakulam in a KSRTC bus. Bahadhur buys a lottery ticket from a boy, and the boy gives another ticket to Lal as he doesn't have change. The trio part ways after reaching Ernakulam, but later come to know that the lottery ticket which Lal got has won one crore rupees. Then Lal, Bahadhur, and Shasthri join hands and go in search of the missing ticket. This forms the crux of the story.

== Cast ==
- Jayasurya as Sree Lal
- Nedumudi Venu as Bahadur
- Aju Varghese as Darmajan Shastri
- Sandra Simon as Thara
- Mala Aravindan as C. P. Damodharan
- Nandu as Lal's father
- Parvathy as Lal's mother
- Nobi as Balan
- Liimal G Padath as Assistant Director
- Minon as Sreekuttan, the lottery-selling boy
- Kavitha Nair as Teacher
- Pradeep Kottayam as Thara's father
- Amith Chakalakkal as Arjun
- Adwaith Jayasurya as Lal's childhood
- Lakshmipriya as Agricultural officer Deepakumari
- Aiswarya Nath

== Production ==
The movie is produced by Jairaj Motion Pictures, with Josemon Simon.

The movie is distributed by Renji Panicker Entertainment.

== Critical reception ==
Lal Bahadur Shastri got mixed to good reviews from critics."Friends media" gave four out of five stars for the film and stated that the film is a clean entertainer "Live media" gave a rating of 4.5/5 for the movie while "The Cinima Company" gave 3 out of 5 and said "LBS is a one time watchable film without much expectation that won't make you bored". LemonMovieMedia rated this as a nice one-time watchable movie, without much twists and turns. Lay back, relax and watch though it doesn't offer anything exceptional or new. Akhila Menon of "FilmiBeat" gave 2.5/5 and concluded "A one time watch".

== Release ==
The film was released around 80 screens in Kerala. [1] Released on 21 November, distributed by Vendhar Movies in Kerala and Humming Minds Entertainment distributed outside Kerala.
