= Lechmi =

- Theatrical release poster
- Directed by: B.N Shajeer Sha
- Written by: Sajeer Ahammed; B.N. Shajeer Sha
- Produced by: Shamsher Creations
- Starring: Parvathy Ratheesh; Maanav; Sajeer Ahammed; Deepu Parassala; B.N.Shabeer; Biju Sopanam; Poloko Motlaleng
- Cinematography: Ranjith Murali
- Edited by: Suhas Rajendran
- Music by: Dheeraj Sukumaran
- Production company: Shamsher Creations
- Distributed by: Shamsher Creations
- Release date: 25 August 2017
- Running time: 149 minutes
- Country: India
- Language: Malayalam

Lechmi is an Indian, Malayalam-language comedy horror film directed by B.N Shajeer Sha, and story by Sajeer Ahammed and B.N.Shajeer Sha under the banner of Shamsher Creations. The film stars, Parvathy Ratheesh, Maanav, Sajeer Ahammed, B.N. Shabeer, Deepu Parassala, Biju Sopanam, Sethu Lekshmi, Moly Angamaly, Master Jiyaaz and Master Faraaz. Parvathy Ratheesh plays a salient, yet enigmatic role in the movie.

== Plot ==
The central theme of the movie revolves around four bachelors, Vineeth, Ikku, Stephen and Sudhi. The story advances from an incident that made unforeseen, dramatic changes in their lives. Once a spirit comes to their flat. This Spirit (Lechmi) doesn't remember anything, where she comes from, her real name, who killed her, and so on. With the help of Baba Swami (Biju Sopanam), an exorcist they came to know more about the spirit. The story of the film revolves around the incidents happen afterward.

== Development ==
The producer as well as an artist in the movie Mr. Sajeer Ahammed's friendship with the director B.N.Shajeer Sha and with the artist Maanav has paved way for the development of the story into the movie "Lechmi". Various discussions were done from the beginning and proper screening and analysis were executed from time to time.

Working with their story, B.N. Shajeer and Sajeer Ahammed, following their collaborating efforts on the film stated that the film will surely create a radical impact on the society as it centralizes extensively on the pressing issues of women's safety. Through the characters of the four "gentlemen", the story points up the fact that humanity has still not completely dissipated from our society. Parvathy Ratheesh, who plays the leading role in the film commented that the story has impressed her since it is a female-oriented subject with a powerful pertinent message. The crew strongly represents the movie as "a real family entertainer."

Lechmi's shooting began on 27 April 2017 at Thiruvananthapuram and was completed on 4 June 2017. The filming covered most of Thiruvananthapuram and Tamil Nadu border areas. Some crucial shots and song sequences were taken at Merryland and Chitranjali studios and at some places in and around Thiruvananthapuram. Actress Parvathy Ratheesh was injured May 2017 during filming in Trivandrum.

== Origin and writing ==
The director's personal fascination for morbidity and versatility is what drives the script. Lechmi is the director's second movie, his first being Lbw : Love, Breakup & War. After working on the script for quite a long time, B.N. Shajeer Sha and Sajeer Ahammed, the brains behind the movie, decided to move on with their subject. The movie seeks to elicit elevated heartbeats at different stages and assures to reach its heights at the climax. Here horror overlaps with fantasy, supernatural components, and thriller genres. Stunt master Brucelee Rajesh has played an incredible role in giving the fight sequence a most thrilling and a nerve-racking outlook. Ghostly appearances of artists were made explicitly morbid and dreadful with the skill of the make-up artist Mr. Sreejith Kalai Arasu.

== Cast ==
- Parvathy Ratheesh as Lechmi
- Maanav as Vinu
- Sajeer Ahammed as Stephen
- Deepu Parassala as Ikku
- B.N.Shabeer as Sudhi
- Biju Sopanam as Baba Swami
- Poloko Motlaleng as Samuel "Sam"Anderson
- Sreekutty as Maami
- Vaiga as Soumya
- Sethulekshmi as Amma
- Moly Angamaly (Chala Mary) as Kunjumol
- Master Faraaz as Christy
- Master Jiyaaz as Kannan
- Kalabhavan Rahman as Security
- Rajesh Nair as Gounder

== Filming ==
Shooting commenced on 27 April 2017. A pooja was conducted at S.P. Grand Days, Thiruvananthapuram on 24 April. The presence and blessings of well-known artists like M.R. Gopakumar, Maniyanpilla Raju and other veterans of Malayalam film industry made the occasion a prestigious one. The film was shot at locations in and around Thiruvananthapuram and at times at Kerala-Tamil Nadu border areas. Major fight scenes and some song sequences were shot in Chitranjali and Merryland studios. Shooting got over by 4 June 2017. Mathew Jacob gave voice for Poloko Motlaleng and it was widely appreciated for the modulation and accent.

== Music ==
Music was incorporated as an essential part of the movie. The film's soundtrack was composed by Shah Broz with lyrics written by Shahida Basheer and Sajeer Ahammed. The Background Music is done by Dheeraj Sukumaran.
