= Vaarikkuzhiyile Kolapathakam =

- Poster
- Directed by: Rejishh Midhila
- Written by: Rejishh Midhila
- Produced by: Shibu Devadath; Sujeesh Kolothody; Rejishh Midhila
- Starring: Amith Chakalakkal; Dileesh Pothan
- Cinematography: Eldo Isaac
- Edited by: R.Sreejith
- Music by: Mejo Joseph
- Production company: Take One Entertainments
- Release date: 22 February 2019
- Running time: 125 minutes
- Country: India
- Language: Malayalam
- Budget: ₹ 2.5 cr
- Box office: ₹ 5 - 6 cr

Vaarikkuzhiyile Kolapathakam (transl. Murder in the ditch) is a 2019 Indian Malayalam-language mystery thriller film written, co-produced and directed by Rejishh Midhila. It stars Amith Chakalakkal and Dileesh Pothan, with Mejo Joseph, Amira Varma, Nedumudi Venu, Shammi Thilakan, Lena and Nandu in supporting roles. Lal made a cameo appearance. It was released on 22 February 2019. The film is getting ready for a release in China. The film received positive reviews and was praised for Amith's performance. The film was a commercial success.

== Plot ==
Fr. Vincent Kombana is a roguish and a kindhearted priest of Kombana family, famous in his village. He was trained by his father Isaac Kombana to become a police officer first. Vincent grew up to be a police officer, fulfilling his dream, but when things got really complicated, Vincent became a priest. All the people in the village are fond of Vincent and fear him very much. He gets information from his peon Kunjoyi regarding all sorts of legal and illegal businesses and once anyone gets caught, he receives a huge punishment. His other subordinates were Kurukkan Ponnappan and Member Rocky.

One midnight as Vincent was walking through field, he hears a cry of a person to find out that it was a murder done by Kattuthara Joy. He saw the whole incident where Joy asks his companion to put the body of the dead person into a ditch after digging it. Vincent as a witness to this murder decided to expose this in front of the society. However, he couldn't do it as Joy confessed about the murder to Vincent. But Joy did not tell him whom he killed. As a priest couldn't tell any confessions out, Joy utilized his opportunity to frame the murder onto someone else. Even though Vincent had hidden in behind the bushes, Joy saw him. Vincent understood that Joy hadn't actually confessed sincerely. It was his only way to trap Vincent in order to escape from the case. Vincent, day by day continued his strong prayers for a solution. Kunjoyi then comes and informs Vincent about the death of Lissy, Joy's beloved wife. The next day her funeral goes with further songs and sorrow. However, before taking any decision, Vincent was eager to know who was murdered in the ditch. So as to get an idea, he went to the same place when the body was hidden. He began digging to find whose the body was. Vincent came across many burdens including the enquiry of Salamma for her brother who had been missing for many days after he went to Pollachi.

Vincent decides to give the land to Kunjoyi in order to get rid of digging the plot where the body had been dug. After all the agreements, people finds out the body and Kunjoyi informs about this to Vincent. He immediately reaches the spot. It is found whose the body was. It was Eldhose who was killed by Joy. The police informs Vincent that it was a murder as they found many spots of stabs. Vincent tells Joy that he will prove this case with the help of someone else. Joy shows Vincent a video. The video shows Vincent digging the ditch which was taken by Joy without the knowledge of Vincent. If Joy shows this publicly, then it is sure that Vincent will be blamed. Vincent requested Joy to delete the video. Joy said that if Vincent does the flag hoisting, then Joy will confront the clapping hands. Vincent then thinks of another way to imprison Joy and finally starts his prayer keeping all his secrets in mind. Meanwhile, Santo, Joy's friend overheard his prayers and his plans to rescue Santo as he too would be killed by Joy. Vincent then asked the reason behind murder of Eldhose as Santo was present beside Joy and helped him bury Eldhose's body in the ditch.

Then a flashback shows, as Eldhose was returning from Pollachi he met Joy only to find him furious. Joy came to know from his wife Lissy that her daughter's actual father was Eldhose. As Eldhose stood disappointed Joy said, "My confidence is getting hindered by your existence." and stabs him multiple times to kill him. Back to the present, Vincent and his policemen managed to lock Santo as a witness to the murder committed by Joy. Later Vincent moves to Joy to enquire about Lissy's death and already knew that it was Joy who killed her by poisoning her.

== Cast ==
- Amith Chakalakkal as Ex-CPO Fr. Vincent Kombana
- Dileesh Pothan as Kaattuthara Joy
- Amira Varma as Anjali
- Nedumudi Venu as Kurukkan Ponnappan
- Lal as Isaac Kombana (cameo appearance)
- Mejo Joseph as Eldose
- Dheeraj Denny as Lijo
- Sudhi Koppa as Josephkutty
- Anjana Appukuttan as Shakunthala
- Lena as Lissy
- Anjali Nair as Salamma
- Parvathi T. as Fr. Vincent's mother
- Nandu as Member Reji
- Shammi Thilakan as Kunjachan
- Gokulan as Bijukuttan
- Kainakary Thankaraj as Kattuthara Vakkachan
- K. T. C. Abdullah as Kunjalikka
- Naseer Sankranthi as Antappan
- Abraham Koshy as Man at the toddy shop
- Shibu Devadatt as CI Vighnesh
- Kichu Tellus as Arangath Benny
- Rajesh Raghavan as Stephen
- Rohit Madhav as Kochachan
- Leena Antony
- Baby Malu
- Mary
- Baby as Sarala
- Dheeraj Denny as Lijo
