= Biju Sopanam =

Malayalam film actor

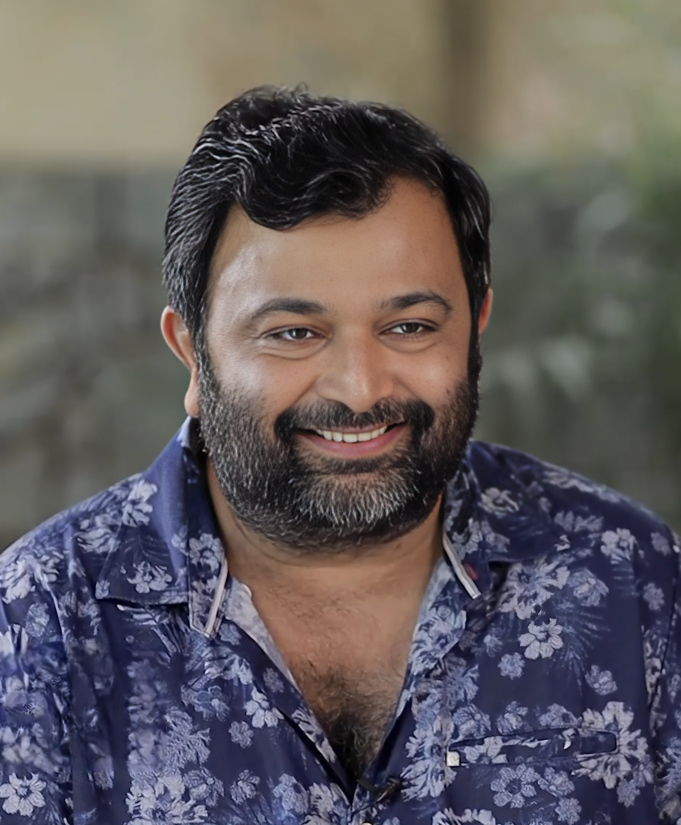
- Biju in September 2022
- Born: 4 January 1970 (age 56); Thiruvananthapuram, Kerala, India
- Occupation: Actor
- Years active: 1995–present
- Known for: Uppum Mulakum (Sitcom)
- Spouse: Lakshmi

Biju Sopanam (born 4 January 1970) is an Indian television, theatre, and film actor. He is best known for portraying the character of Balachandran Thampi in the sitcom Uppum Mulakum, broadcast on Flowers TV. He made his movie debut in a small role in the movie Rajamanikyam in 2005. He is a Sanskrit drama artist and was trained under Kavalam Narayana Panicker, Indian dramatist.

== Early life ==
He was born in Kulathoor, Neyyattinkara, Thiruvananthapuram. His younger brother, Binoj Kulathoor, is also a television artist.

== Career ==
He started his career as a theatre artist at the age of 20 in Kavalam Narayana Panicker's Sopanam Theatre Group. Along with the group he travelled across India participating in National Theatre Festival(Bharat Rang Mahotsav) and other prestigious programmes. He wanted to get into movies through this but he later revealed that after joining the group he become totally focused on drama and subsequently he left his dreams of becoming a film actor. From 2005 to 2013 he acted in three different films portraying short roles. Then in 2015 he was cast as Benjamin Brunou, a college principal in the television series Back Benchers, being telecasted in Amrita TV. On seeing him in this programme he was called up by director R.Unnikrishnan for his upcoming sitcom being made for Flowers TV. This programme is considered as his breakthrough. He was cast as Balachandran Thampi, a carefree, loving father and husband in the sitcom which was named as Uppum Mulakum. As he had to spend more time on the sets of Uppum Mulakum, his guru Kavalam Narayana Panicker asked him to stop it. But after being impressed by his work in it, he was allowed to do it, but in return he was asked to never leave theatre, which he agreed and now leads the group after his guru's death in 2016, trying to work there through his busy schedule. He skyrocketed to fame for his work in the programme drawing praise from various media organisations. Then he was called for a supporting role as Advocate Subbu in C/O Saira Banu.

== Controversies ==
In December 2024, Biju Sopanam was named in a sexual assault complaint filed by a female actress associated with the television series Uppum Mulakum. The complaint alleged that Biju Sopanam sexually assaulted the actress during the shoot, while his co-actor S. P. Sreekumar was accused of intimidating her to prevent her from speaking out. The case was initially registered with the Infopark Police and later transferred to the Thrikkakara Police for further investigation. A Special Investigation Team (SIT) was formed to investigate the matter. Following the complaint, both actors exited the show pending the outcome of the investigation.

== Filmography ==
Key
†	Denotes films that have not yet been released

Year	Title	Role	Notes
2005	Rajamanikyam		
2006	Bhargavacharitham Moonam Khandam		
2010	Nallavan	Man in lockup	
2011	Veeraputhran		
2013	Black Butterfly		
2014	Otta Mandaram		
2017	C/O Saira Banu	Advocate Subbu	
2017	Lechmi		
2018	Kuttanpillayude Sivarathri	Suneesh	
2018	Thattumpurath Achuthan		
2019	Janaadhipan		
2019	Pathinettam Padi	Shalamon Abraham Palakkal	
2019	Love Action Drama	Dinesh's Uncle	
2019	Adhyarathri	Satheesh	
2019	Kamala	Ravi	
2019	Gauthamante Radham	Shibu Asan	
2021	Djibouti		
2022	Priyan Ottathilanu	Chekkuttan	
2022	Upacharapoorvam Gunda Jayan	Sugathan	
2022	Ally	Manoharan	
2022	Mukundan Unni Associates	Dr. Sebatti	
2023	Laika		
2023	Madhura Manohara Moham	Jose	
2023	Kunjamminis Hospital	Fr. Ainickal Joy	
2023	Pendulum	Tea Shop Owner	
2023	Rani	Vasu	
2024	Iyer in Arabia	Thomaskutty	
2024	Varshangalkku Shesham	Film producer	
2024	Big Ben		
2024	Idiyan Chandhu	Surendran	
2024	Oru Anweshanathinte Thudakkam	Kottayam Crime Branch SI Achuthan	
2026	Mollywood Times	Mathew Abraham	
2026	Lurk		
TBA	Dear Joy †		

== Television ==
Year	Programme	Role	Channel	Notes	Ref.
2015	Back Benchers	Benjamin Brunou, College Principal	Amrita TV		
2015-2024	Uppum Mulakum	Kulathara Shoolamkudi Veetil Balachandran Thampi (Balu)	Flowers TV		
2018	Krithyam	Shivanna	YouTube	Short film	
2020-2021	Double Decker	Paramada Veetil Balu	Flowers TV	Reprising his role from Uppum Mulakum	
2021	Pappanum Padminiyum	Pappan	YouTube	Web series	
2021	Eruvum Puliyum	Balu	Zee Keralam	Telefilm	
2021	Kattan	Omanakuttan (Omana)	YouTube	Web series	
2022	Erivum Puliyum	Freddy	Zee Keralam	Reboot of Uppum Mulakum	

== Awards ==
Award	Year	Category	Programme	Result	Ref.
Kerala State Television Award	2017	Best Comedian	Uppum Mulakum	Won	
Flowers Comedy Awards	2016	Best Star Pair	Uppum Mulakum	Won	
Flowers TV Award	2017	Best Actor	Uppum Mulakum	Won	
