= Kallai FM =

2018 film

- Theatrical release poster
- Directed by: Vineesh Millennium
- Screenplay by: Vineesh Millennium
- Produced by: Santhosh Kumar T. V. Shajahan Oasis
- Starring: Sreenivasan; Sreenath Bhasi; Parvathy Ratheesh
- Cinematography: Sajan Kalathil
- Edited by: Shaleesh Lal
- Music by: Gopi Sundar
- Production company: Lord Krishna Entertainments
- Distributed by: Lord Krishna Entertainments Release
- Release date: 16 February 2018
- Running time: 113 minutes
- Country: India
- Language: Malayalam

Kallai FM is a 2018 Indian Malayalam-language drama film written and directed by Vineesh Millennium. Dialogues were written by Sreenivasan, who also starred alongside Sreenath Bhasi and Parvathy Ratheesh. The film is based on the real-life story of a radio repairer named Radio Koya (original name Hydros Koya) residing at Mankavu, Kozhikode, who was an ardent fan of singer Mohammed Rafi.

== Plot ==
Sreenivasan plays the role of Radio Koya, an ardent fan of late veteran playback singer, Mohammed Rafi.

== Cast ==
- Sreenivasan as Ceylon Bappu
- Sreenath Bhasi as Rafi Mohammed, Ceylon Bappu's Son
- Parvathy Ratheesh as Saira Banu, a flower seller and daughter of Ceylon Bappu
- Aneesh G Menon as Aju, Director
- Kalabhavan Shajohn as Abdullah Koya
- Kottayam Nazeer as Inaasu
- Krishna Prabha as Jameela, Ceylon Bappu's wife
- Sunil Sukhada as Purushu
- Vijilesh Karayad

== Production ==
The story of the film is based on the real life of K. Hydrose who is commonly known as Radio Koya, a radio repairer who lives in Kozhikode and a proud follower of Mohammed Rafi.

== Release and marketing ==
The film was released on 16 February 2018. Indian fast bowler, Irfan Pathan served as the promotional campaigner for the film in Kochi. The film music was released by the South Indian-based music record label, Muzik 247. The trailer of the movie was launched at CUSAT campus in Kochi on 6 February 2018. Veteran Hindi actor Jackie Shroff, Mohammed Rafi's son Shahid Rafi along with Irfan Pathan attended the launching event.
