= Praavu =

2023 Indian Malayalam romantic thriller film

- Promotional poster
- Directed by: Navaz Ali
- Written by: Navaz Ali
- Produced by: P. R. Rajasekharan; Manju Mole
- Starring: Amith Chakalakkal; Sabumon Abdusamad; Yami Sona; Manoj K. U.; Nisha Sarangh; Adarsh Raja
- Cinematography: Antony Jo
- Edited by: Jovin John
- Music by: Bijibal
- Production company: CET Cinema Pvt. Ltd.
- Distributed by: Wayfarer Films
- Release date: 15 September 2023
- Running time: 122 minutes
- Country: India
- Language: Malayalam

Praavu (transl. Pigeon) is a 2023 Indian Malayalam-language romantic thriller film written and directed by Navaz Ali. The film was produced by P. R. Rajasekharan under the banner of CET Cinema Pvt. Ltd. The film has an ensemble cast of leading actors like Amith Chakalakkal, Sabumon Abdusamad, Yami Sona, Manoj K. U., Adarsh Raja, and Nisha Sarangh in lead roles. The film was distributed by Dulquer Salmaan's Wayfarer Films.

The music and background score was composed by Bijibal and the lyrics were penned by B. K. Harinarayanan, while the cinematography and editing were handled by Antony Jo and Jovin John.

Principal photography began on 1 December 2022. The filming took place in and around Thiruvananthapuram and was wrapped up on 30 December 2022. The post-production works were started in January 2023. The film was released on 15 September 2023.

== Plot ==
Praavu is inspired by a short story by the renowned Malayalam writer P. Padmarajan. The film begins with a group of four middle-aged friends—Aravindan, Kamalasanan, Adv. Manoharan Nair, and Chendamangalam Harikumar—who regularly meet for drinking sessions, during which their conversations often drift into morally questionable territories.

Parallelly, the story follows two Fine Arts college students, Vivek Viswanathan and Charutha Thomas, who, after attending a friend's wedding, find themselves stranded near a forest at night. Their paths cross with the aforementioned group of men, leading to a tragic incident that profoundly impacts all involved. Vivek and Charu gets stuck in a lodge near the forest while riding back to home, this same time the 4 men gang of advocate Manoharan also staying grief struck as their plan of bringing actress to the hotel for sexual enjoyment got blocked by his wife, and Manoharan comes to know college student pair is staying as couple so plays drama acting as police for raid they threaten Charu and Vivek, Charu gets emotionally threatened as she very afraid of her sick father who if comes to know cannot tolerate and anything happens to the father Charu gets very worried and so Vivek starts begging to avoid any arrest but strongly prepared advocate Manoharan with Kamalasanan tells social media with their channel reporting is also on the way, so Vivek begs help and Kamalasanan takes him to a room and locks him there, now except Aravindan rest everybody rapes Charu and next day morning only Vivek is let out after Charu opens the locked door. Charu is depressed till one day Vivek tells he many times have only wished Charu to be his partner. One day Vivek overhears his friends telling, after seeing news of a similar incident where a girl is raped by fake police but the lover is unable to do anything, that the lover unable to do anything against crime against his girl is not fit to live. Vivek gets emotionally disturbed and is seen committed suicide dead. The 4 men gang Aravindan tells Vivek suicide was only because of them. Chendamangalam after drunk gets dropped to his house nearby by Aravindan but after seeing someone walking behind Chendamangalam the scene shifts to next day morning and Chendamangalam is seen lying naked on roadside and all people laughs and fun on him and some take video and put in social media, Chendamangalam gets awake and lies crawled in shame, he gets a phone call telling he should understand the shame of a girl who lost her honour, same time police comes and arrest him, Chendamangalam later released from police give key of his astrology office to Aravindan to sell as he is leaving that place. Kamalasanan is very happy as he is a father now as his wife is pregnant but after few moments later gets a video showing his wife with someone and also gets call by phone telling you should understand the pain when your partner gets cheated. Kamalasanan is in deep tears and sits at home without meeting any friends. Advocate Manoharan is seen celebrating birthday of his daughter and wife close by, now gets phone call telling his sex enjoyment video with another girl depti will be shown to his wife if Manoharan don’t confess to his wife what he did to Charu so Manoharan tells everything to his wife and daughter nearby, hearing of everything wife and daughter very angry leaves the house leaving Aravindan alone. Manoharan is seen alone drinking at home tells to Aravindan he wont anymore meet Aravindan . now flashback shows Aravindan did everything after he saw Vivek’s house and family members grief-struck due to Vivek’s death. After several day painting exhibition going on and Charu gets informed by Aravindan how he punished everyone but Charu tells Aravindan if shown courage on the incident night could saved her honour and also avoid Viveks death so she finds Aravindan as also a member equally like the other 3 men.

The narrative delves into the aftermath of this encounter, exploring themes of trauma, guilt, and societal judgment. It portrays the psychological turmoil experienced by both the victims and the perpetrators, highlighting the complexities of human behaviour and the consequences of one's actions.

== Cast ==
- Amith Chakalakkal as Aravindan
- Sabumon Abdusamad as Kamalasanan
- Adarsh Raja as Vivek Viswanathan
- Nisha Sarangh as Suchithra
- P. R. Rajasekharan as Chendamangalam Harikumar
- Yami Sona as Charutha Thomas
- Manoj K. U. as Adv. Manoharan Nair
- Dini Daniel
- Aji Dhanwanthari
- Gayathri Nambiar
- Aleena
- Ajayan Thakazhi
- Aiswarya as Annie
- Jamsheena Jamal as Aparna
- Teena Sunil as Priyanka
- Rejin Raj as Rajeev
- Teena Sunil as Priyanka

== Production ==
The title of the film was officially announced on 28 November 2022. The first look poster was released on 18 August 2023 by megastar Mammootty through his social media handles.

=== Filming ===
The makers started the principal photography on 1 December 2022 with the switch-on ceremony and completed it on 30 December 2022. It took 30 days to complete the shoot. The major shooting was completed in Thiruvananthapuram, Ponmudi, Kallar, and Vithura.

== Music ==
Praavu

Soundtrack album by Bijibal
- Released: 2023
- Genre: Feature film soundtrack
- Language: Malayalam
- Label: Manorama Music

Bijibal chronology
| Neelavelicham (2023) | Praavu (2023) |

The original background score and songs are composed by Bijibal. The lyrics were penned by B. K. Harinarayanan. The song "Oru Kattu Pathayil" was sung by Ranjith Jayaraman. The music rights of the film were bagged by Manorama Music and Songs.

Track listing
| No. | Title | Lyrics | Music | Singer(s) | Length |
|---|---|---|---|---|---|
| 1. | "Tharakam Pole" | B. K. Harinarayanan | Bijibal | Najim Arshad | 2:40 |
| 2. | "Anthikallu Pole" | B. K. Harinarayanan | Bijibal | Jaison J. Nair; Antony Michael | 2:32 |
| 3. | "Oru Kaattu Pathayil" | B. K. Harinarayanan | Bijibal | Ranjith Jayaraman | 4:06 |
| Total length: | | | | | 8:78 |

== Release ==
The film was released on 15 September 2023. The official trailer and the release date have been announced by Dulquer Salmaan through social media handles.
