= Djibouti (film) =

2021 Indian Malayalam-language film

- Theatrical release poster
- Directed by: S. J. Sinu
- Written by: S. J. Sinu; Afsal Abdul Latheef
- Produced by: Jobi P. Sam
- Starring: Amith Chakalakkal; Shagun Jaswal; Jacob Gregory; Dileesh Pothan; Anjali Nair; Biju Sopanam
- Cinematography: T. D. Sreenivas
- Edited by: Samjith Mohammed
- Music by: Deepak Dev
- Production companies: Blue Hill Nael Communications; Nile & Blue Hill Motion Pictures
- Release date: 31 December 2021
- Country: India
- Language: Malayalam

Djibouti is a 2021 Indian Malayalam-language action thriller film co-written and directed by S. J. Sinu (in his directorial debut). The film stars Amith Chakalakkal, Shagun Jaswal, Dileesh Pothan, Jacob Gregory, Biju Sopanam, and Anjali Nair. The film was produced by Jobi P. Sam under the company Blue Hill Nael Communications and Nile & Blue Hill Motion Pictures. The film was released in theatres on 31 December 2021.

== Plot ==
Hannah, a Djiboutian girl visits Kerala. She becomes friends with Louie and Aby who are living in Idukki district of Kerala. She arranges job for her friends in Djibouti, an African country. The problems faced by them there and how they plan to escape to their hometown becomes the premise of the movie.

== Cast ==
- Amith Chakalakkal as Louie
- Shagun Jaswal as Hannah
- Jacob Gregory as Aby
- Dileesh Pothan as Thomachan
- Geetha as Loui's Mother
- Anjali Nair as Gracy
- Athira Harikumar as Sherin
- Kishore as Circle Inspector
- Rohit Maggu as Razzaq
- Biju Sopanam as Jayan
- Pauly Valsan cameo role
- Jayashree Sivadhas as Kunjumol
- Sunil Sukhada as Ramettan
- Alancier Ley Lopez as Philip
- Naseer Sankranthi as Barber

== Production ==
The film was announced in January 2020. The first schedule of the shooting started in Idukki district, Kerala in February 2020. After the first schedule, a team of seventy five members went to Djibouti for the second schedule shooting during first week of March 2020. After that many countries announced lockdown due to COVID-19 pandemic. The crew still continued the shooting by isolating themselves in Tadjoura, an old city in Djibouti as there was no covid threat in that area. At that time Djibouti was the only Malayalam film in production as all other shooting were banned due to COVID-19 lockdown. They finished their second schedule on 19 April 2020, but was unable to return as the airport in that area was closed due to the lockdown announced on 16 March 2020. For about one month the team stayed in a villa complex in the city and after that they sought for help to bring them back. By the help of the Indian Embassy and the producer, the team returned to Kerala in a private flight on 5 June 2020. The crew had planned another schedule in China which was cancelled and the shooting was completed in 2020.

The teaser of the film was released by the prime minister of Djibouti, Abdoulkader Kamil Mohamed on 25 March 2021. The music launch of the film was conducted in Kochi in April 2021. Prithviraj Sukumaran, Dulquer Salman, Jayasurya and Fahad Fasil released the trailer of the movie in August 2021, through their social media accounts.

== Music ==
Deepak Dev composed the songs and background scores for the film. Kaithapram Damodaran Namboothiri and Vinayak Sasikumar are the lyricists for the songs.

Song title	Singer(s)	Lyrisict(s)	Length	Ref.
"Vinninazhake Kanninithale"	Shankar Mahadevan; Bindu Aravind	Kaithapram Damodaran Namboothiri	3:58	
"Ore Manam"	Vijay Prakash	Vinayak Sasikumar; Kaithapram Damodaran Namboothiri	5:14	

== Release ==
Djibouti was released in theatres on 31 December 2021. The film was originally scheduled to release on 10 December 2021. It was a box office disaster.
