= Vijay Jacob =

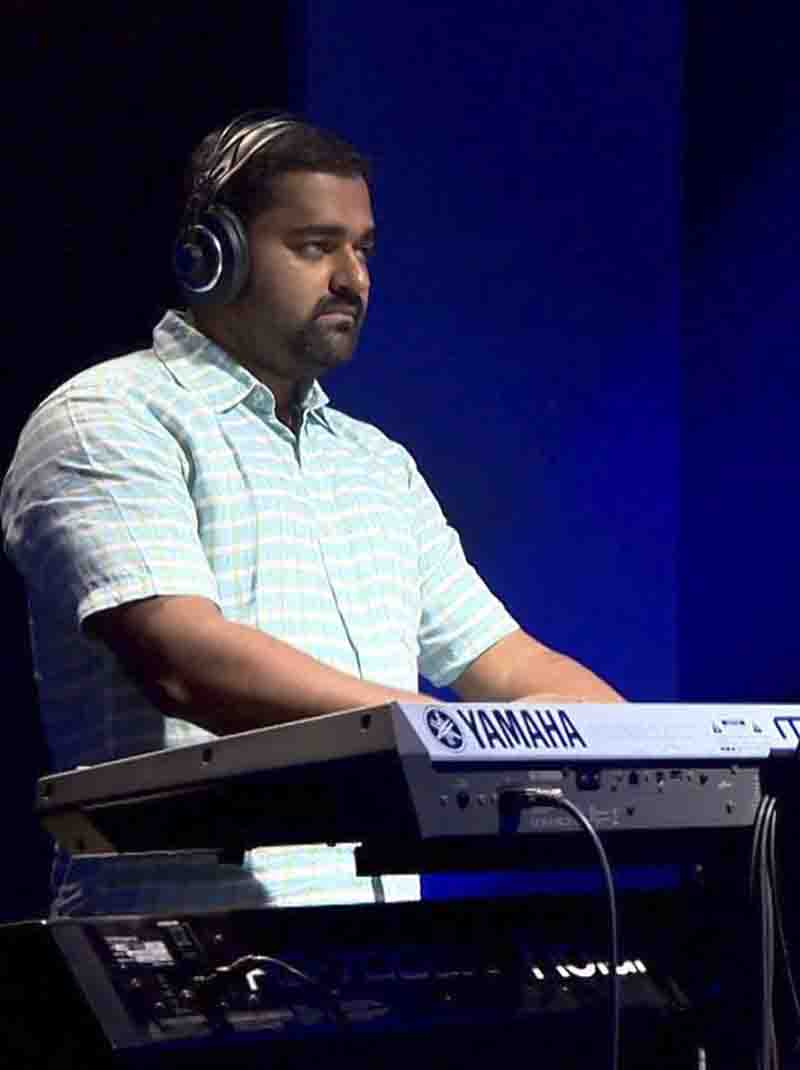
- Vijay Jacob

Background information
- Born: 30 August 1980 (age 45); Ernakulam, Kerala, India
- Genres: Film score, soundtrack, world music, Indi-pop, Dance music, Classical music
- Occupations: Actor, Film composer, Music Director, Record producer, Singer, Instrumentalist
- Instruments: Keyboards, vocals
- Years active: 2004–present

Vijay Jacob is an Indian actor and music composer in the Malayalam film industry.

== Career ==
=== Acting career ===
Vijay Jacob is an actor in the Malayalam film industry.

- In 2022, he appeared in a supporting role in the film Bro Daddy.
- In 2025, he played the supporting role in Painkili.
- In 2025, he played a supporting role in Get-Set Baby.

=== Music career ===
Vijay Jacob entered the film industry as a keyboard programmer in 2004. He worked with many music directors like M Jayachandran, Bijibal, Deepak Dev, Jassie Gift. He became an independent film score composer with the Malayalam cinema Melle and composed the song "Punjapadathe" He has scored the background music as well for the movie Melle - a folkish tune in Vaikom Vijayalakshmi's voice. In 2025, he served as the music director for the film Pralayashesham Oru Jalakanyaka.

== Filmography ==
=== As an Actor ===
- Bro Daddy (2022) – Supporting role
- Painkili (2025) – Supporting role
- Get Set Baby (2025) – Supporting role
- Prince And Family (2025)

=== As a Music Director ===
- Melle (2017)
- Pralayashesham Oru Jalakanyaka (2025)
