= Mithun Ramesh =

Indian actor, television presenter (born 1981)

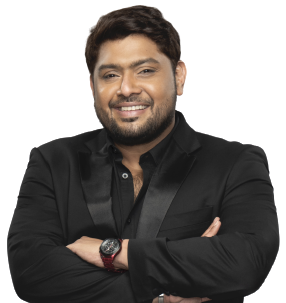
- Born: Mithun Ramesh Chandrashekaran Nair; 4 May 1981 (age 45); Thiruvananthapuram, Kerala, India
- Occupations: Actor; television presenter
- Years active: 2000–present

Mithun Ramesh (born 4 May 1981) is an Indian actor and television presenter working in Malayalam films and television.

== Early life and career ==
Mithun Ramesh was educated at the Loyola School, Thiruvananthapuram and at Mar Ivanios College, Thiruvananthapuram.

He is also a radio jockey on Hit 96.7 FM in Dubai. He made his acting debut in 2000 with the film Life Is Beautiful. In 2013, along with his colleague Sindhu Biju, he set a Guinness World Record for the "longest marathon for a radio music show" that lasted for 84 hours and 15 minutes. Ramesh hosts Comedy Utsavam on Flowers TV.

== Filmography ==
Key
| † | Denotes films that have not yet been released |

=== As actor ===
List of Mithun Ramesh film acting credits
| Year | Title | Role | Notes |
|---|---|---|---|
| 2000 | Life Is Beautiful | Rajan Panicker | |
| 2002 | Sesham | Nithin | |
| 2002 | Kadha | Janko | |
| 2002 | Nammal | Reji | Also dubbing artist for Jishnu Raghavan |
| 2003 | Swapnam Kondu Thulabharam | Freddy | |
| 2004 | Runway | Johny | |
| 2004 | Gaurisankaram | Gopi | |
| 2004 | Vettam | Felix | |
| 2005 | Kalyana Kurimanam | Sudeep | |
| 2007 | Goal | Mohan | |
| 2009 | Nammal Thammil | Vicky's Friend | |
| 2011 | Sevenes | Ashokan | |
| 2012 | Diamond Necklace | Basheer | |
| 2012 | Run Baby Run | Adv. Manilal | |
| 2012 | Banking Hours 10 to 4 | Vishnu Ramachandran | |
| 2012 | Perinoru Makan | Anil | |
| 2013 | Nee Ko Njaa Cha | Manu | Cameo appearance |
| 2014 | 100 Degree Celsius | Lovely's Husband | |
| 2014 | Avatharam | Karimban Joby | |
| 2015 | Madhura Naranga | Ashraf | |
| 2015 | Pathemari | Najeeb | |
| 2016 | Vettah | Emil Kurian | |
| 2016 | Kochavva Paulo Ayyappa Coelho | Sugunan | |
| 2018 | Diwanjimoola Grand Prix | Grand Prix Announcer | |
| 2018 | Kuttanpillayude Sivarathri | Sachin Vaikundam | |
| 2019 | March Randam Vyazham | | |
| 2019 | Jimmy Ee Veedinte Aishwaryam | Jimmy John Adakkakaran | Lead role |
| 2020 | Varky | Dr.Abbas | |
| 2020 | Al Mallu | Fasal | |
| 2022 | Baby Sam | Anto | Lead role |
| 2022 | Mei Hoom Moosa | Basheer | |
| 2022 | Two Men | Sony | |
| 2022 | Shefeekkinte Santhosham | Navas | |
| 2023 | Made in Caravan | Prem | |
| 2024 | Jamalinte Punjiri | Adv. Sandeep | |
| 2024 | Paalum Pazhavum | Sumesh | |
| 2025 | Innocent | Bineesh | |

=== As voice actor ===
List of Mithun Ramesh film voice acting credits
| Year | Title | Dubbed for | Character | Director | Notes |
|---|---|---|---|---|---|
| 2002 | Nammal | Jishnu Raghavan | Shivan | Kamal | |
| 2002 | Nakshathrakkannulla Rajakumaran Avanundoru Rajakumari | Renju | Karthik | Rajasenan | |
| 2002 | Shivam | | | Shaji Kailas | |
| 2003 | Gramaphone | Firoz Khan | Piyush Soni | Kamal | |
| 2003 | Chronic Bachelor | Biyon | Young Sathyaprathapan | Siddique | |
| 2003 | Chakram | Binoy Angamaly | Giri | A. K. Lohithadas | |
| 2004 | Akale | Tom George Kolath | Freddy Evans | Shyamaprasad | |
| 2004 | Koottu | Richard Rishi | Harikrishnan | Jayaprakash | |
| 2004 | Wanted | Nishanth Sagar | Mani | Murali Nagavally | |
| 2004 | Aparichithan | Siraj | Vinod Varghese | Sanjeev Sivan | |
| 2012 | Mallu Singh | Unni Mukundan | Hari Narayanan Alias Harinder Singh Alias Mallu Singh | Vysakh | |
| 2012 | Veendum Kannur | Rajeev Pillai | Mohit Nambiar | Haridas | |
| 2012 | Hero | Srikanth | Premanand | Diphan | |
| 2013 | Buddy | Srikanth | Neil Fernandez | Raaj Prabhavathy Menon | |

== Television ==
List of Mithun Ramesh television credits
| Year | Program | Role | Channel | Notes |
|---|---|---|---|---|
| 2000 | Butterflies | Host | Surya TV | |
| 2001 | Little Masters | Host | Asianet | |
| 2003 | Sthreejanmam | actor | Surya TV | Serial |
| 2004 | Valayam | actor | DD | Serial |
| | Suryakanthi | actor | DD | Serial |
| 2007 | Narmadipudava | actor | DD | Serial |
| 2015–2016 | Smart Show 60 | Host | Flowers TV | |
| 2016–2020 | Comedy Utsavam | Host | Flowers TV | |
| 2018 | Comedy Utsava Yathra | Host | Flowers TV | |
| 2018–2019 | Kidilan comedy Utsavam | Host | Flowers TV | |
| 2019 | Badai Bungalow | Host | Asianet | Comedy Talk Show |
| 2019 | D 5 Juniors | Co-Host | Mazhavil Manorama | Grand finale only |
| 2019 | Uppum Mulakum | Jimmy | Flowers TV | serial |
| 2021 | Comedy Utsavam Chapter 2 | Host | Flowers TV | |
| 2021 | Super 4 Season 2 | Co-Host | Mazhavil Manorama | Grand finale only |
| 2021-2022 | Super 4 juniors | Host | Mazhavil Manorama | |
| 2022 | kuttykalavara | Host | Flowers TV | |
| 2022-2024 | Comedy Utsavam Chapter 3 | Host | Flowers TV | |
| 2025-2026 | Star Singer 10 | Co- Host | Asianet | |
