= Sayanora Philip =

Indian singer

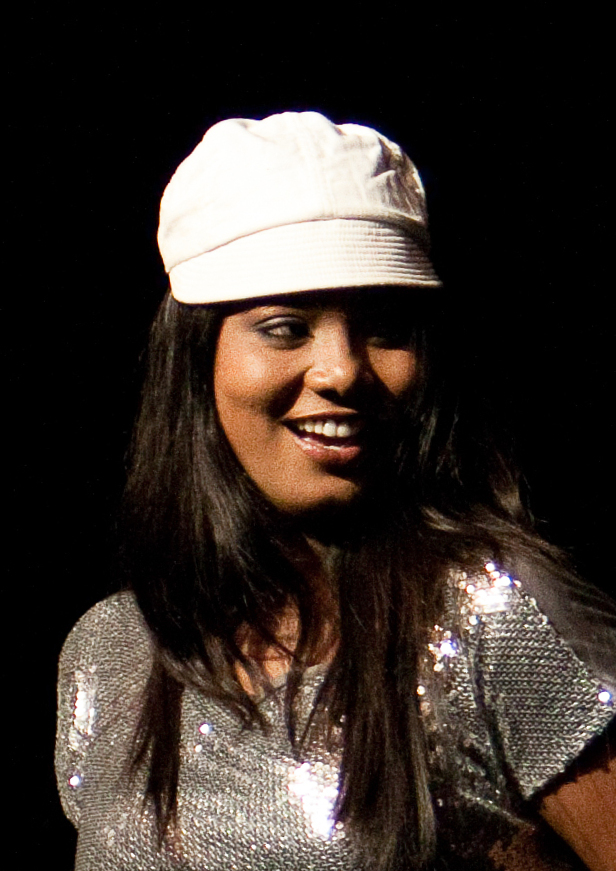

Background information
- Born: Sayanora; Kannur, Kerala, India
- Genre: Playback singing
- Occupations: Singer; Dubbing Artist
- Instrument: Vocalist
- Years active: 2004 – present
- Website: sayanoraphilip.com

Sayanora Philip is an Indian playback singer and dubbing artist who works in Malayalam and Tamil film industry.

== Early life ==
Sayanora was born in Kannur. She did her schooling in St. Teresa's Anglo Indian Girls High School and degree from S. N. College, Kannur. She was appreciated for her singing abilities. She participated in many singing competitions during her school days and won many prizes. Currently she lives in Kochi, Kerala.

== Filmography ==
Year	Title	Role	Notes.
2006	Pranayakalam	Herself in a song	Song: Kari Ravin
2022	Wonder Women	Saya	
2025	Oru Jaathi Jathakam	Baby	

== Dubbing ==
- 2018: Rabbit Hole – Narrator
- 2018: Hey Jude for Trisha
- 2019: Stand Up for Nimisha Sajayan
- 2023: Master Peace – Mona Lisa (narrator)
- 2024: Barroz 3D for Joshua Okesalako
- 2025: Lokah Chapter 1: Chandra for Kalyani Priyadarshan
- 2025: Odum Kuthira Chaadum Kuthira for Kalyani Priyadarshan

== Discography ==
=== Hindi songs ===
Song(s)	Film	Year	Singer	Lyrics	Musician
Lut Gayee	Hulchul	2004	Gayathri Iyer, Poornima, Rajalakshmi	Sameer	Vidyasagar

=== Malayalam songs ===
Song(s)	Film	Year	Singer	Lyrics	Musician
I love You December	Vettam	2004	MG Sreekumar, Jyotsna Radhakrishnan	Rajeev Alunkal	Berny–Ignatius
Am I Dreaming	Manjupoloru Penkutti	2004	Sayanora Philip	Shelton Pinheiro	Alphons Joseph
Chocolate Hero	Monalisa	2004	Unmesh Basheer	Rajeev Alunkal	Sandeep Chowdhary
Nee Manassakeyeki	Monalisa	2004	M. G. Sreekumar	Rajeev Alunkal	Sandeep Chowdhary
Saagaram Mizhikalil	Quotation	2004	Sayanora	Brajesh Ramachandran, Arun, Ambrose	Sabish George
Arya Proud of Youth	Arya	2006	Anwar Sadath, Chorus	Mankombu Gopalakrishnan, Rajeev Alunkal	Devi Sri Prasad
Oru Penkidaavu (D)	Prajapathi	2006	Jassie Gift, Sujatha Mohan, Chorus	Gireesh Puthenchery	Thej Mervin
Mast Mast	Chacko Randaaman	2006	Franco	Vayalar Sarath Chandra Varma, Joffy Tharakan	Sundar C Babu
Ethra Kaalam Naam (Sathyam Collections)	Classmates (2006 film)	2006	Franco, Renjini jose	Vayalar Sarath Chandra Varma	Alex Paul
Changaathikkoottam Vannu	Notebook (2006 film)	2006	Afsal, Rimi Tomy, Vidhu Prathap	Vayalar Sarath Chandra Varma	Mejo Joseph
Mazhayude Cherumani	Notebook (2006 film)	2006	Afsal, Rimi Tomy, Vidhu Prathap	Vayalar Sarath Chandra Varma	Mejo Joseph
Manohari (song)	Baahubali: The Beginning	2015	Vijay Yesudas	Mankombu Gopalakrishnan	M. M. Keeravani
Kar raavin	Pranayakalam	2007	Sayanora, Franco	Rafeeq Ahamed	Ouseppachan
Mizhi malarukal	Rani Padmini	2015	Sayanora	Rafeeq Ahamed	Bijibal
Aadivaram	Jo and the Boy	2015	Sayanora		Rahul Subramanian
O January	Big B (film)	2007	Sayanora		Alphons Joseph
Athiradee	Sivaji (film)	2007	A. R. Rahman		A. R. Rahman
"Kattil Mel Adithadia"	Agam Puram	2010	Sayanora, Ranjith	V. Elango	Sundar C. Babu
Kannil Kannil	Comrade in America	2017	Haricharan	Rafeeq Ahamed	Gopi Sunder
Unarukayano	Udaharanam Sujatha	2017	Sayanora	BK Harinarayanan	Gopi Sunder
Nee Njangada	Udaharanam Sujatha	2017	V. Suresh Thampanoor, Sithara, Divya S. Menon, Rajalakshmy	Santosh varma	Gopi Sundar

=== Tamil songs ===
Year	Film	Song(s)	Musician	Singer	Lyrics
2004	Madhurey	"Ice Katti Ice Katti"	Vidyasagar	Karthik	Pa. Vijay
2007	Sivaji: The Boss	"Athiradee"	A. R. Rahman		Vaali
2008	Dhaam Dhoom	"Thikku Thikku"	Harris Jayaraj	Benny Dayal	Pa. Vijay
2009	Ayan	"Honey Honey"	Harris Jayaraj	Devan Ekambaram	Pa. Vijay
2011	Ko	"Gala Gala"	Harris Jayaraj	Tippu, Krish & Haricharan	Kabilan
2012	Thuppakki	"Alaikka Laikka"	Harris Jayaraj	Javed Ali & Sharmila	Pa. Vijay

=== As music composer ===
Film	Year
Kuttanpillayude Sivarathri	2018
Aaha	2021

=== Albums/singles ===
Song(s)	Album	Year	Singer	Lyrics	Musician
Uyire	Single	2016	Sayanora Philip	Sayanora Philip	Sayanora Philip
Bhula Diya	Single	2018	Sayanora Philip, Rayshad Rauf	Zan Hussain	Sreejith Pillai
Sarvam Saha... Vendayini	Single	2022	Sayanora Philip, Indulekha Warrier	Vaisakh Sugunan, Sayanora Philip	Sayanora Philip
Aare Jiyare	Single	2023	Sayanora Philip, Rap Kid India	Aditya Garg, Rap Kid India	Sayanora Philip & Varkey

== Awards ==
Dubbing
Year	Award	Film	For	Ref
2024	Kerala State Film Awards	Barroz	Joshua Okesalako	
