= Aaha (2021 film) =

- Theatrical release poster
- Directed by: Bibin Paul Samuel
- Written by: Tobit Chirayath
- Produced by: Prem Abraham
- Starring: Indrajith Sukumaran; Manoj K. Jayan; Amith Chakalakkal; Ashwin Kkumar; Santhy Balachandran
- Cinematography: Rahul Balachandran
- Edited by: Bibin Paul Samuel
- Music by: Songs: Sayanora Philip; Background Score: Shiyad Kabeer
- Production company: Zsazsa Productions
- Release date: 19 November 2021
- Running time: 146 minutes
- Country: India
- Language: Malayalam

Aaha is a 2021 Indian Malayalam-language sports drama film directed by Bibin Paul Samuel. Produced by Prem Abraham under the banner Zsazsa Productions, Aaha marks Bibin's directorial debut. Starring Indrajith Sukumaran in the lead, also featuring Manoj K. Jayan, Amith Chakalakkal, Ashwin Kkumar and Santhy Balachandran.

Tobit Chirayath scripted the film. The film was produced by Prem Abraham under the banner Zsazsa Productions and the music was composed by Sayanora Philip and Shiyad Kabeer.

== Premise ==
The film is inspired from a very popular tug of war team of the 1980s and 1990s: Aaha Neeloor, who were on the top of their game for about fifteen years. The story revolves around rustic characters who do manual work such as rubber tapping and catering by day. By night, however, these people are superstars because of the tug of war games.

== Cast ==
- Indrajith Sukumaran as Kochu
- Manoj K. Jayan as Geevarghese / Geevichan Aashan
- Amith Chakalakkal as Ani
- Ashwin Kkumar as Chenkan
- Santhy Balachandran as Mary
- Jayashankar Karimuttam
- Sidhartha Siva
- Arun Kumar Pavumba as Jaison
- Solomon Sangchoju as Binayak
- Anup Pandalam as Sinu
- Nitin Thomas as Pakkan Biju
- Vidhya Vijayakumar as Anu
- Megha Thomas as Grace
- Shiva Raaj as Polla
- Aswathlal as Siju
- Akhil Manoj as Sreenath

== Production ==
The principal photography of the film began 2019 and completed in 62 days in over 84 locations, about 160 crew members and around 6000 artists. The filming was completed in January 2020.

== Music ==
The songs were composed by Sayanora Philip for the lyrics written by herself and Jubith Naradath.

Track	Song	Lyricist	Singer(s)
1	Thandodinja Tharama	Sayanora Philip	Vijay Yesudas, Sayanora Philip
2	Kadamkadhayai	Jubith Namradath	Arjun Ashokan, Sayanora Philip
3	Ee Ulakil	Traditional Knanaya Folk Song	Others
4	Ea manam thodum	Titto P Thankachen	Rhithwik S Chand

== Release ==
Aaha was scheduled to release on 4 June 2021, but was postponed due to COVID-19 pandemic in India. On 12 November 2021, the makers officially announced that it will be released on 19 November 2021.

Filmmakers have indicated their desire to release the film theatrically despite the delay due to COVID-19 shutdowns, in lieu of releasing to an OTT platform.
