= Shefeekkinte Santhosham =

- Theatrical release poster
- Directed by: Anup Pandalam
- Written by: Anup Pandalam
- Produced by: Unni Mukundan
- Starring: Unni Mukundan; Divya Pillai; Bala; Athmiya Rajan
- Cinematography: Eldho Isac
- Edited by: Noufal Abdullah
- Music by: Songs: Shaan Rahman; Background Score: Ranjin Raj
- Production company: Unni Mukundan Films Pvt Ltd.
- Release date: 25 November 2022
- Running time: 128 minutes
- Country: India
- Language: Malayalam

Shefeekkinte Santhosham (transl. Shafeek's happiness) is a 2022 Indian Malayalam-language film written and directed by Anup Pandalam. The film stars Unni Mukundan, Divya Pillai, Bala and Athmiya Rajan. It is produced by Unni Mukundan and the music is composed by Shaan Rahman. It was theatrically released on 25 November 2022.

== Cast ==
- Unni Mukundan as Shefeek
- Divya Pillai as Sainaba
- Bala as Ameer
- Athmiya Rajan as Merlin
- Manoj K. Jayan as Subair, Ayurveda Doctor
- Shaheen Siddique
- Krishna Kumar as Hakkim, Shefeek's father
- Rahul Madhav
- Govind Padmasoorya
- Sminu Sijo
- Mithun Ramesh
- Aneesh Ravi
- Boban Samuel
- Krishna Prasad
- Arun Sankaran Pavumba
- Geethi Sangeetha
- Azees Nedumangad
- Jordy Poonjar
- Unni Nair

== Production ==
On 19 August 2021, Unni Mukundan officially announced the second project of his production venture and Mammootty sharing the title poster"Shefeekkinte Santhosham" through social media.

Muhurat shot and formal launch was done on 16 April 2022, in Erattupetta. The shoot was completed on 10 July 2022.

== Soundtrack ==
Shefeekkinte Santhosham

Soundtrack album by Shaan Rahman
- Released: 2022
- Recorded: 2022
- Genre: Feature film soundtrack
- Language: Malayalam

Official audio
- Shefeekkinte Santhosham - Full Album on YouTube

The songs were composed by Shaan Rahman. The song "Ponpularikal Porunney" was sung by Unni Mukundan with lyrics by Manu Manjith.

No.	Title	Artist(s)	Length
1.	"Khalbile Hoori"	Unni Mukundan	4:19
2.	"Ponpularikal Porunney"	Unni Mukundan	4:33
3.	"Vanambaadi"	Najim Arshad	4:20
4.	"Piriyaam"	Shaan Rahman	4:50
5.	"Shefeekkinte Santhosham Theme-1"	Shaan Rahman	4:33
Total length:			21:55

== Reception ==
=== Critical response ===
A critic from The Times of India wrote that "The film is all about Shefeek trying to create happiness in others’ lives and ultimately realising that it is important to take care of his happiness. Happiness is a perspective. Also, it's a paradox. Shefeekinte Santhosham can be added to the latter". A critic from onManorama wrote that "At a time when Mollywood is churning out different narratives and stories, Shafeekkinte Santhosham featuring Unni Mukundan and directed by Arun Pandalam does not make any attempt to be loud or different. Instead, the filmmaker sticks to the all too familiar terrain. Despite these, the casting, humour and twists do the trick and make the romantic comedy an entertaining watch". A critic from Indian Express rated the film 2.5/5. A reviewer of Zee News Says "Shefiq only wants to make everyone happy. But many people can connect with Shafiq's life in life when it is only prepared with setbacks and failures. There are many Shafiqs in our society. Shafiqs who will do anything to see a smile on someone else's face. Shafiq's happiness is their story". Sanjith Sidhardhan from OTT Play wrote "While Anup doesn't resort to any experiments with the storytelling format, the movie's scripts runs out of idea too fast and becomes a stretch, even with a duration of just two hours".

== Controversy ==
Bala alleged that he was not paid for the film, which was dismissed by the director, Unni Mukundan, and the music director.
