= Nisha Sarangh =

Indian actress

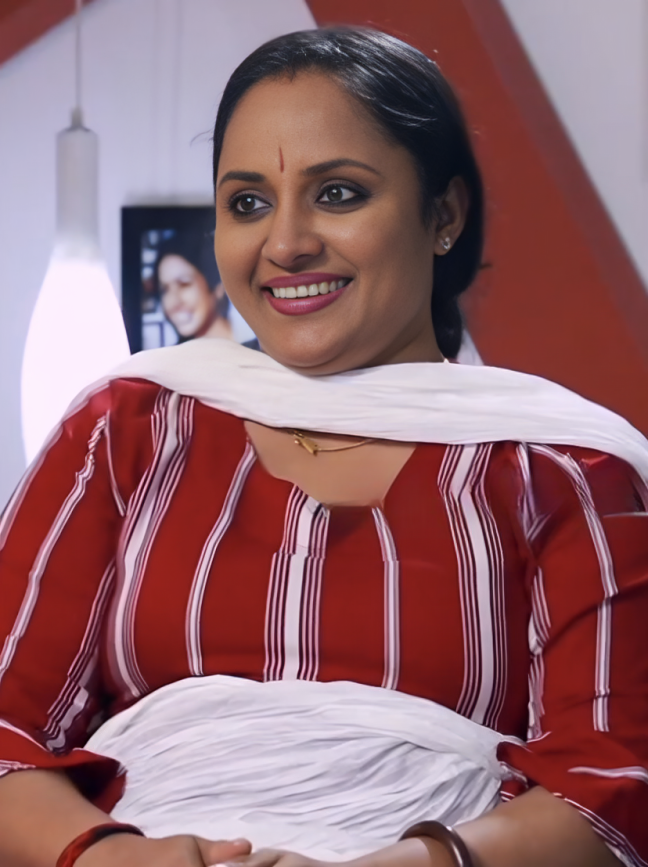
- Sarangh in 2019
- Born: Ernakulam, Kerala, India
- Occupations: Actor; Television anchor; Classical dancer
- Children: 2
- Parents: Saranghadhan; Shyamala

Nisha Sarangh is an Indian actress who appears in Malayalam films and television serials. She is best known for playing the character of Neelima in the TV sitcom Uppum Mulakum, broadcast on Flowers. She won the Kerala State Television Award for Best Comedian in a Special Jury Category in 2017.

== Personal life ==
Nisha Sarangh was born in Ernakulam. Nisha was married to her cousin early in her teenage but later the couple got divorced. She has two daughters, Revathy and Revitha. The elder daughter Revathy got married in 2018. She currently lives in Kakkanad, Kochi.

== Filmography ==
Year	Title	Role	Notes
1999	Agnisakshi	Kathakali dancer	
2002	Krishna Pakshakkilikal	Teacher	
2003	Hariharan Pilla Happy Aanu	Sushama (Maid)	
2003	Ente Veedu Appuvinteyum	Teacher	
2003	Swantham Malavika	Raji	
2004	Vajram	Sushama	
2004	Manjupoloru Penkutti	Lilly teacher	
2004	Kaazhcha	Teacher	
2004	Kathavasheshan	Police Inspector's wife	
2005	December	Sr. Molly	
2005	Hridayathil Sookshikkan	Servant	
2005	Chandrolsavam	Mrs. Vasu	
2005	Boyy Friennd	Father Kacharathara's wife	
2005	Police	Zeenath	
2005	Iruvattam Manavaatti	Vilasini	
2005	Oridam	Staff of Jwala	
2006	Raashtram	Chandy's relative	
2006	Yes Your Honour	Narayani Velayudhan	
2006	Pothan Vava	Paulachan's wife	
2007	Janmam	Devaraayar's mother	
2007	Big B	George's wife	
2007	Payum Puli	Sarala	
2007	Aakasham	Raghunanandan's wife	
2007	Nagaram	Seetha	
2007	Flash	Dhwani's kin	
2007	Kichamani MBA	Seethalakshmi	
2007	Chotta Mumbai	Nadeshan's wife	
2008	Annan Thambi	Drunkard's wife	
2008	Kerala Police	Director's wife	
2008	Cycle	Nun	
2008	Parunthu	Mahendran's wife	
2008	Shakespeare M.A. Malayalam	Drama artist	
2008	Oridathoru Puzhayundu	Mallika	
2008	Chempada	Lekha	
2009	Shudharil Shudhan	Ramankunju's mother	
2009	Hailesa	Indu	
2009	Vairam: Fight for Justice		
2009	Malayali	Madhavan's sister	
2009	Red Balloon		
2010	Karayilekku Oru Kadal Dooram	Bhanu	
2010	Oru Small Family	Sweeper in hospital	
2010	Oridathoru Postman	Sumangala	
2010	Aathmakatha	Rosie	
2010	Chekavar	DYSP Menon's wife	
2010	Nalla Pattukare	Jameela	
2010	Kaaryasthan	Herself	
2011	Adaminte Makan Abu	Sulaiman's wife	
2011	Janapriyan	Drama actor's wife	
2011	Orma Mathram	Jinnumma	
2011	Achan	Mother	
2012	MLA Mani: Patham Classum Gusthiyum	Surabi	
2012	Masters	Roy's wife	
2012	My Boss	Sneha	
2012	Parudeesa	Sonichan's wife	
2012	Nadhabrahmam	Lakhmi	
2012	Crime Story	Annie	
2012	Matinee	Jayasree	
2012	Grihanathan	Nandakumar's wife	
2013	Olipporu	Kumaran's wife	
2013	Amen	Mathachan's wife	
2013	Ms Lekha Tharoor Kaanunnathu	Madhuri's mother	
2013	Oru Indian Pranayakatha	Sivaraman's wife	
2013	Ithu Manthramo Thanthramo Kuthanthramo	Enquired wife	
2013	Ithu Pathiramanal	Kanakam	
2013	Ayaal	Villager	
2013	Kittuo	Anu	Short Film
2013	Drishyam	School principal	
2013	Police Maaman	Circle Inspector	
2013	3 G Third Generation		
2013	Thekku Thekkoru Deshathu		
2013	Namboothiri Yuvavu @43	Gigi Gopal	
2014	Vegam	Molly	
2014	Happy Journey	Molly	
2014	Villali Veeran	Pavithran's sister	
2014	Ring Master	Sathyavel's wife	
2014	Malayalakkara Residency	Residency member	
2014	Koottathil Oral	Manju's mother	
2015	Thinkal Muthal Velli Vare	Herself	
2015	Namukkore Aakasham	Rony's mother	
2015	Snehikkan Oru Manassu		
2016	Yathra Chodikkathe	Suma	
2016	Romanov	Angelin's mother	
2016	Kolamass	Vandana's mother	
2016	Vayyaveli	Jameela	
2017	Avarude Raavukal	Bindhu Jayamurugan	
2017	Bobby	Bobby's mother	
2017	Clint	Ammu's mother	
2017	Ladoo	Angelin's mother	
2019	Lonappante Mamodeesa	Sicily	
2019	Jeem Boom Bhaa	Ravi's wife	
2019	Oru Nakshathramulla Aakasham		
2019	Immah	Molikutty	
2019	Thanneer Mathan Dinangal	Keerthi's mother	
2020	Bhoomiyile Manohara Swakaryam	Mariyam	
2020	Kappela	Mary	
2022	Meppadiyan	Stella	
2022	Prakashan Parakkatte	Latha	
2022	Aanandam Paramanandam	Gireesh's mother	
2023	Laika	Vimala	
2023	Jaladhara Pumpset Since 1962	Lalitha	
2023	King of Kotha	Sister Reena	
2023	Praavu	Suchithra	
2023	Theeppori Benny	Gracy	
2023	Maharani	Vijeesh and Ajeesh's mother	
2023	Bullet Diaries		
2024	Panchavalsara Padhathi		
2024	Big Ben	Susan	
2024	Ezhuthola	Parukutty	
2024	Paalum Pazhavum	Janani	
2025	Madhura Kanakku	Vimala	
2026	Baby Girl	Akash's mother	
2026	Iruniram		
2026	Kalam Paranja Kadha		
2026	Avaraachan & Sons		

== TV serials ==
Year	Serial	Channel	Notes
1999-2000	Sindoorakuruvi	Surya TV	
	Durga	Asianet	
	Motiram	DD Malayalam	Telefilm
	Makal	DD Malayalam	Telefilm
	Anantham	DD Malayalam	
	Kalikoottam	Jeevan TV	
	Pradakshinam	DD Malayalam	
2005	Alilathali	Asianet	
2005	Mounam Nombaram	Kairali TV	
2006	Veendum Jwalayayi	DD Malayalam	
2006	Suryodayam	DD Malayalam	
2006	Suryaputhri	Asianet	
2006	Priyam	Kairali TV	
2006	Manassariyathe	Surya TV	
2007	Velankani Mathavu	Surya TV	
2008	January	Asianet	
2008	Indhumukhi Chandramathi	Surya TV	
2008	Sree Ayyappanum Vavarum	Surya TV	
2008	Minnal Kesari	Surya TV	
2008	Ente Alphonsamma	Asianet	
2008	Vishudha Thomasleeha	Asianet	
2009	Vigraham	Asianet	
2009	Snehathooval	Asianet	
2009	Kudumbayogam	Surya TV	
2009	Gajaraja Guruvayoor Keshavan	Surya TV	
2010	Parayi Petta Panthirukulum	Surya TV	
2010	Mattoruval	Surya TV	
2010	Karunyam	DD Malayalam	
2010	Chakravakam	Surya TV	
2011	Nilavilakku	Surya TV	
2011	Ilam Thennal Pole	Surya TV	
2012	Daivathinu Swantham Devootty	Mazhavil Manorama	
2013	Panchagni	Kairali TV	
2013	Makal	Surya TV	
2013	Rudraveena	Surya TV	
2013	Swargavathil	Jaihind TV	
2014	Balaganapathy	Asianet	
2014	Kumkumapottu	Prabhatham	
2014	Sthreedhanam	Asianet	
2014	Vadhu	Surya TV	
2015	Spandanam	Surya TV	
2015	Akkamma Stalinum Pathrose Gandhiyum	Asianet	
2015	Sundari	Mazhavil Manorama	
2015	Kalyanasoughandhikam	Asianet	
2015-2024	Uppum Mulakum	Flowers TV	Portrays Neelima Balachandran
2015-2016	Bandhuvaru Shathruvaru	Mazhavil Manorama	
2016	Sundarimookku	Kairali TV	
2016	Vishudha Chavara Achan	Flowers TV	
2018	Seetha	Flowers TV	Special appearance
2020	Double Decker	Flowers Online	Web series
2020	Kas Kas	Online	Web series
2020-2021	Pappanum Padminium	Online	Web series
2021-2022	Ajmalbismi Kattan	Youtube	Web series
2022	Erivum Puliyum	Zee Keralam	
2026– present	Ee Puzhayum Kadannu	Asianet	
