= Jimmy Ee Veedinte Aishwaryam =

2019 Malayalam film

- Directed by: Raju Chandra
- Written by: Raju Chandra; Anoop Mohan
- Produced by: Shino John
- Starring: Mithun Ramesh; Divya Pillai
- Cinematography: Anil Eswar
- Edited by: Sunil S. Pillai
- Music by: M. Jayachandran
- Release date: 6 December 2019
- Running time: 122 minutes
- Country: India
- Language: Malayalam

Jimmy Ee Veedinte Aishwaryam is a 2019 Indian Malayalam-language film directed by Raju Chandra and produced by Shino John. Mithun Ramesh made his debut as a lead actor in the film.

== Synopsis ==
Jimmy is a businessman who settled in Dubai with his family. He marries Jancy Vetilakaran, whose life mainly revolves around her pet dog, whose name is also Jimmy. When she gets married, her relationship with her husband ends up in conflict.

== Cast ==
- Mithun Ramesh as Jimmy John Adakkakaran
- Divya Pillai as Jancy Vettilakaran
- Aju Varghese as Jimmy (voice)
- Suraj Venjaramoodu as Dimitri Rodriguez
- Joy Mathew as John Adakkakaran
- Sreeja Ravi as Rosykutty
- Idavela Babu as Kunnamkulam Baby
- Johny Antony as Prem Prakash Pothen
- Hareesh Kanaran as Ayyappan
- Nirmal Palazhi as Salgunan

== Release and reception ==
The movie was released on 6 December 2019 and generally received mixed reviews from the critics and audience. While some praised the comedy scenes in the movie, others criticised it for the poor acting. The songs in the movie received little praise.
