= Baby Ameya =

Indian actress (born 2018)

- Born: Ameya Anilkumar; 5 January 2018 (age 8); Prayer, Ochira, Kollam, Kerala, India
- Other name: Parukutty
- Occupation: Child actor
- Years active: 2018–present
- Known for: Uppum Mulakum

Ameya Anilkumar (born 5 January 2018), credited professionally as Baby Ameya, is an Indian child actress who predominantly works in Malayalam-language soap operas. She is well known for her role of Parukutty in the sitcom Uppum Mulakum aired on Flowers.

== Early life ==
Ameya was born on 5 January 2018 in Prayer near Ochira in Kollam district of Kerala. Her father is Anil, is a vegetable vendor and her mother, Ganga Lakshmi is a housewife. She has an elder sister, Anikha and a younger brother, Aadhav.

== Filmography ==
=== Television ===
Year	Show	Role	Channel	Notes	Ref.
2018– present	Uppum Mulakum	Parvathy Balachandran Thampi (Parukutty)	Flowers TV	Debut	
2019	Star Magic	Herself	Flowers TV	Guest appearance	
2019	Comedy Utsavam	Herself	Flowers TV	Guest appearance	
2021	Erivum Puliyum	Parukutty	Flowers TV	Zee Keralam	Telefilm
2021	Kaliveedu	Young Anu	Surya TV	Cameo appearance	
2022	Erivum Puliyum	Cutie	Zee Keralam	Reboot of Uppum Mulakum	
2022–2024	Uppum Mulakum 2	Parukutty	Flowers TV		
2022	Star Comedy Magic	Guest	Flowers TV		
2024	Swargavathil Pakshi	Sreekutty	Flowers TV	Surya TV	
2025	Othiri Othiri Swapnangal	Archa	Mazhavil Manorama		

== Awards ==
- 2024 Kerala State Television Awards for Best child actress (Uppum Mulakum, Swargavathil Pakshi)
