= Kochavva Paulo Ayyappa Coelho =

2016 Indian film

- Theatrical release poster
- Directed by: Sidhartha Siva
- Screenplay by: Sidhartha Siva
- Produced by: Kunchako Boban
- Starring: Kunchako Boban; Anusree; Rudraksh Sudheesh; Suraj Venjaramood; Nedumudi Venu; K. P. A. C. Lalitha
- Cinematography: Neil D'Cunha
- Edited by: Vineeb Krishnan
- Music by: Shaan Rahman
- Production company: Udaya Pictures
- Release date: 9 September 2016
- Country: India
- Language: Malayalam

Kochavva Paulo Ayyappa Coelho is a 2016 Indian Malayalam-language comedy drama film written and directed by Sidhartha Siva. It was produced by Kunchacko Boban, who also stars in the title role, along with Rudraksh Sudheesh. The film marks the return of Udaya Pictures, an early film production company in Malayalam cinema, after 30 years. Anusree played the female lead role. The film was released during the festival of Onam on 9 September 2016.

The film's title is inspired by Brazilian novelist Paulo Coelho (and is a combination of the names of Coelho author and the story's main characters who are inspired by him). A central theme in the film is inspired by Coelho's novel, The Alchemist.

== Plot ==
Ayyappa aka Appu dreams of flying in an airplane, but his wish hasn't been fulfilled despite coming very close to getting on to a plane a couple of times. When his father, who works in the Gulf, sent tickets, he was unable to go as he had chickenpox. The next time he got an opportunity, news of his father's death in a road accident arrived just a day before the flight.

Kochavva, on the other hand, is a villager who likes to teach kids cycling and swimming in his free time. He uses The Alchemist quote to motivate the children. Appu is scared of the water but when he hears Kochavva arguing that swimming is popular internationally and that there are clubs in the cities that sponsor promising swimmers to take part in international competitions, he realises swimming can get him a ticket to fly. Slowly, he begins to learn the sport in all earnestness.

Kochavva is unaware of the reason behind Appu's transformation. When he does learn about it, he feels guilty and tries to dissuade the boy by saying that he may have said things casually and that such clubs do not exist in reality. This has a devastating effect on the child, and it makes Kochavva want to help him. From here on we see Kochavva going in search of such a club and finally, finding one in Bengaluru. Then starts the journey of the two to materialize the boy's dream.

== Cast ==
- Kunchako Boban as Ajaya Kumar (Kochavva)
- Rudraksh Sudheesh as Ayyappa Das (Appu)
- Abeni Aadhi as Ambili
- Madhav Hari as Kannan
- Anusree as Anju Mol
- Suraj Venjaramood as Susheelan Kochettan
- Mukesh as Sreekumar
- Aju Varghese as Rajeev
- Nedumudi Venu as Appooppan Thambi
- K. P. A. C. Lalitha as Ammoomma Sri Latha
- Muthumani as Girija
- Sudheesh as Reji
- Musthafa as Saji
- Irshad as Mohandas (Omanakuttan)
- Maniyanpilla Raju as Maniyanpillai
- Mithun Ramesh as Sugunan
- Krishna Prasad
- Jeo Baby as Villager
- Sudhi Kozhikode as Villager
- Biju Menon as Airline passenger (Cameo appearance)
- Parvathy Ratheesh as Journalist (Cameo appearance)

== Production ==
It is 87th production of Udaya and 75th film acted by Kunchacko Boban. He has already announced that fifty percent of the profit from the film will be spent on charity. The movie was extensively shot in Bangalore, Pollachi, Adimaly, Thiruvananthapuram, and Perumbavoor.

KPAC was planned to complete filming in four schedules. The filming began on 14 March 2016 in Adimaly, Kerala. After a break, the second schedule started in Adimaly in April 2016. By late June 2016, the crew finished filming their Thiruvananthapuram schedules and shifted to Perumbavoor.

== Release ==
The film released on 9 September 2016 in more than 80 screens in Kerala, on the occasion of Onam.

== Critical response ==
The Times of India gave it 4 out of 5 and wrote "The story has what it takes to leave the viewers buoyed by satisfaction at the end and is also guaranteed to bring some tears to their eyes". Deccan Chronicle gave the film 3.5 out of 5 and stated "Though motivational in outlook, Sidhartha makes it lively through humour and twists. Kochavva Paulo Ayyappa Coelho is a good example of how a National Award winner can shake off the tag to come up with a good commercial entertainer". Manorama Online rated the film 3 out of 5 stars saying that "Kochavva Paulo Ayyappa Coelho is a feel-good movie". Filmi Beat gave it 3.5 out of 5 and wrote "KPAC is a decent entertainer which deals with a very simple plot and narrates it in a very beautiful manner. Kudos to the director Sidhartha Siva, for excellently portraying the viewpoint of children and making the complete use of the talents of his actors and this film is a perfect classy entertainer for this Onam season. Don't miss this one". Onlookers Media rated the film 7 out of 10 stars saying that "Kochavva Paulo Ayyappa Coelho is a feel-good simple entertainer which gives you a message about life. It is based on the famous words of Paulo Coelho which he said in his book The Alchemist. If you love simple and class movies, KPAC is a good one for you. Go without the burden of expectation and it will be a satisfying experience for you".

== Soundtrack ==
Music: Shaan Rahman, Sooraj S. Kurup, Lyrics: Vayalar Sarathchandra Varma, Vishal Johnson, Manu Manjith, Sooraj S. Kurup

- "Ethu Meghamaari" - Hesham Abdul Wahab
- "Mele Mukilodum" - Shaan Rahman, Job Kurian
- "Neelakkannula Maane" - Vijay Yesudas, Shweta Mohan
- "Vaanam Mele" - Shankar Mahadevan
