= Member Rameshan 9aam Ward =

2022 Malayalam film

- Theatrical release poster
- Directed by: Anto Jose Pereira; Aby Treesa Paul
- Written by: Anto Jose Pereira; Aby Treesa Paul
- Produced by: Anto Jose Pereira; Aby Treesa Paul
- Starring: Arjun Ashokan; Gayathri Ashok; Chemban Vinod Jose; Indrans
- Cinematography: Eldo Issac
- Edited by: Deepu Joseph
- Music by: Kailas
- Production companies: Boban and Moly Entertainments
- Release date: 25 February 2022 (India)
- Country: India
- Language: Malayalam

Member Rameshan 9aam Ward is a 2022 Indian Malayalam-language film directed by Anto Jose Pereira and Aby Treesa Paul and produced by Boban and Moly under the banners of Boban and Moly entertainments. The movie features Arjun Ashokan, Gayathri Ashok, Chemban Vinod Jose, Indrans, Mareena Michael Kurishinkal. The film was released on 25 February 2022.

== Cast ==
- Arjun Ashokan
- Gayathri Ashok
- Chemban Vinod Jose
- Indrans
- Mareena Michael Kurishinkal
- Anup Pandalam
- Unni Raja as Devassy
- Mamukoya as Abu
- Johny Antony
- Sabumon Abdul Samad as Ajithan Vattakuzhi
- Saju Kodiyan as Ashokan Tharayil
- Sini Abraham As Jomol
- Binu Adimali As Broker

== Production ==
A poster of the film was released on the birthday of actor Arjun Ashokan . and another poster was released during the election period in Kerala.Kailas Menon onboarded composer for the film.

== Reception ==
Deepa Soman a critic from The Times of India gave 3 stars out of 5 and wrote that "The movie might interest those who like Arjun Ashokan and films set in true-blue Kerala villages".

S. R. Praveen of The Hindu stated that "A script that fails to inspire".

Sanjith Sidhardhan critic of OTT Play stated that "Member Rameshan 9aam Ward’s plot is all too familiar for Malayali audience, who have watched the plethora of political satires that the industry has to offer. Even as old wine in a new bottle, this Arjun Ashokan-starrer feels like a lost opportunity.".

A critic of Onmanorama wrote that "Though the cult classic can in no way be compared with Member Rameshan 9aam Ward, it promises a great cinematic experience dwelling on comedy, romance and emotional drama."
