= Kuzhivila =

Locality in Kerala, India

Coordinates: 8.524288297890447°N 76.88961703767814°E

Kuzhivila is a locality in the northwest of Thiruvananthapuram city, Kerala, India. It is located along the Kazhakoottam - Kovalam highway bypass. This bypass is part of NH66. Kuzhivila is near the Thumba Equatorial Rocket Launching Station and two software company campuses—Infosys SEZ and UST. Kuzhivila junction also houses one of the polling booths for state and central elections - Govt. U P School, Kuzhivila.

== Transport ==
Buses (white Ananthapuri and Green non a/c low floor) running towards Venjarammoodu and Chirayinkeezhu via bypass from Eastfort bus stand have a direct stop at Kuzhivila. There are direct bus to Kuzhivila via Sreekaryam-Arasummoodu route. Kaniyapuram bus via Sreekaryam- Kulathoor can be used to reach Kuzhivila by halting at Arasummoodu. Perumathura or Stationkadavu bus' can be used in coastal direction to reach Kuzhivila from Eastfort by halting at Poundukadavu bus stop.

== Nearby places ==
- Aakkulam
- Karimanal
- Kazhakkuttam
- Kulathoor
