= Kulathoor, Thiruvananthapuram =

Kulathoor
- village
- Location in Kerala, India Kulathoor (India)
- Coordinates: 8.3276°N 77.0873°E
- Country: India
- State: Kerala
- District: Thiruvananthapuram
- Talukas: Neyyattinkara

Government
  - Body: Gram panchayat

Population (2011)
  - Total: 32,394

Languages
  - Official: Malayalam, English
- Time zone: UTC+5:30 (IST)
- PIN: 695506
- Telephone code: 0471
- Vehicle registration: KL-20

Kulathoor, is a village in Neyyattinkara Thiruvananthapuram district in the state of Kerala, India.

== Demographics ==
As of the 2011 India census, Kulathoor grama panchayat has a population of 32394.

== History ==
Local traditions associate Kulathoor with the early Ayi Kingdom and later political developments in southern Kerala. Owing to its location between Attingal and Thiruvananthapuram, the area has been described as strategically important in regional history. Historical accounts refer to the presence of the Kulathoor Kovilakam, a royal residence that functioned as a local administrative and ritual centre. The Kovilakam was associated with the Kolathukara Temple, dedicated to Bhadrakali, a deity widely venerated among several royal and warrior lineages of Kerala. Traditions also link the Kovilakam to the Attingal royal household and to events surrounding the 1721 conflict between the Attingal principality and the British East India Company. Descendants of the Kovilakam are further credited in local accounts with contributions to land administration, temple affairs, and educational institutions in the region.

== Notable people ==
- Biju Sopanam (born 4 January 1970), Indian television, theatre, and film actor
- Rahul Raju (born 20 November 2003), Indian professional footballer

== Localities ==
- Kuzhivila
