= Fireman (film) =

2015 film by Deepu Karunakaran

- Theatrical release poster
- Directed by: Deepu Karunakaran
- Screenplay by: Deepu Karunakaran; G.V. Renjith
- Story by: G.V. Renjith; Manoj
- Produced by: Milan Jaleel
- Starring: Mammootty; Unni Mukundan; Salim Kumar; Nyla Usha
- Cinematography: Sunoj Velayudhan
- Edited by: V. Saajan
- Music by: Rahul Raj
- Production company: Galaxy Films
- Distributed by: Popcorn Entertainments (Australia, New Zealand, Singapore & Botswana)
- Release date: 19 February 2015
- Running time: 118 minutes
- Country: India
- Language: Malayalam

Fireman is a 2015 Indian Malayalam-language disaster film directed by Deepu Karunakaran and produced by Milan Jaleel under the banner of Galaxy Films. The film's shooting was completed in one day. It stars Mammootty, Unni Mukundan, Salim Kumar, and Nyla Usha in the lead roles. The music is composed by Rahul Raj. This movie is shortly based on the Chala LPG tanker disaster.

== Plot ==
The movie starts off with Narendan Achari at a shop with his daughter who has been treated for a brain tumour. He is distracted for some time during which his daughter goes missing. In a frenzy, he rushes to the nearest police station but is frustrated at the officers' lack of effort to find her.

On the same day, a fireman Lakshmanan Pillai has his send-off from service. Later, Achari is driving his car and finding his daughter. He causes an accident making an LPG tanker topple on the road. There are casualties and the police and the fire force arrive and try to contain the situation. However, the tanker springs a leak and a police officer inadvertently causes an explosion despite Pillai's best efforts to thwart this. Pillai gets killed in the ensuing explosion destroying his lower body. Vijay, a fireman appears heroically on the scene and takes over the reins of averting the disaster. Vijay and the police force clash have conflict regarding the action plan to be taken. Eventually, Vijay is given complete reins of the project. Some time later, Achari appears and threatens to light up the area if his daughter is not found within two hours. Vijay tries to calm him, blaming the police for humiliating him. Later, residents at the jail learn of the gas leak and shout to get out. The police with the help of Iqbal calm them. Due to the mounting pressure, the tanker moves and the refinery technicians are able to check the tanker. Vijay stops it by decreasing its pressure to 60 cubic volume before it could blast.

A refinery technician who checks the tanker finds that the screws and the connecting lamp of the chasis were not properly connected to the truck. Simultaneously, the police get information that the tanker drivers have gone missing. Vijay predicts that the tanker accident was pre-planned by a man identified as Achari, to break his criminal friend out of the central jail. However, the force is left with no option but to vacate the jail. Meanwhile, Achari lights an area and Vijay and his team alarmed. They manage to extinguish the fire with in 5 minutes but Shahjahan, a fireman and Vijay's friend dies. After a series of events, Vijay locks himself in jail to find out who the wannabe free prisoner is, Meanwhile, the police chases Achari and during the chase, Achari drives his car to cliff end and gets killed after his car explodes. At the same time, Vijay finds the culprit successfully. He physically and brutally overpowers the culprit who takes a lighter and threatens him to light up the entire area. But when he presses the lighter, the area didn't explode. Vijay reveals that he already instructed his unit to refill the LPG in the tanker to a new tanker, thus thwarting the major disaster. Celebrating victory, Vijay leaves the jail and the culprit is trashed to death by the prisoners.

The next day, Vijay and his team, who are supposed to attend the funeral of their dear colleagues, get an emergency call and decide to thwart the accident. As the hero says, a commoner dialling 101 believes that a fireman would come in any problem to save him.

== Cast ==
- Mammootty as Fireman Vijay
- Unni Mukundan as Fireman Shahjahan
- Siddique as Sakhav Iqbal
- Salim Kumar as Narendan Achari
- Nyla Usha as SP Sherin Thomas IPS
- P. Sreekumar as Retd. Fireman Lekshmanan Pillai
- Manu Varma as Amal, Engineer
- Krishna Prasad as Fireman Prasad
- Baiju VK as DYSP Zachariah
- Sadiq as SI Chandran
- Balaji Sharma as CPO Rajesh
- Hareesh Peradi as Home Minister Sugunan Nair
- Sabumon Abdusamad as Binoy, Comrade
- Padmaraj Ratheesh as Prisoner Bharathan
- Shivaji Guruvayoor as IG Ayyappan Panicker IPS
- Kalashala Babu as Salim Mohammad, Jail Superintendent
- Ragesh Devikrishna as the main accused
- PC Soman as Raghavan
- Shreegopika Neelanath as a journalist
- Kalabhavan Haneef as Satheeshan, Juice seller
- Hariprashanth M G as Prisoner

== Production ==
On 4 September 2014, it was reported that Mammootty would play a firefighter in a movie directed by Deepu Karunakaran. Deepu initially approached Mohanlal for the role. The actor liked the script and suggested some changes in the screenplay. However, after the revision of the screenplay, Deepu had to wait two years for his dates. hence, he decided to cast Prithviraj but the fate was the same. Finally, he offered the role to Mammootty who already knew the story from Mohanlal and the revisions he made. The initial reports stated Andrea Jeremiah and Nyla Usha in the film, but not as Mammootty's pair. On 1 November 2014, Unni Mukundan confirmed about his role through Facebook. Movie planned to start its shoot by the third of October at Ernakulam, but started rolling on 20 October 2014 at Palakkad. The first look poster was released on 26 November 2014 followed by a second one on 29 November 2014 through Mammootty's official Facebook page.

== Release ==
The film was released on 19 February 2015.

== Critical reception ==
The film received positive reviews from critics. Deepa Soman, writing for The Times of India, rated the film 3.5 out of 5 and said, "The movie keeps you on the edge of the seat throughout and there is no dull moment. The freshness of the subject and its intention in recognizing the tribe of firemen is commendable," and she appreciated Mammootty for his performance as a fireman. Tony Mathew of Malayala Manorama wrote: "There was no hype; neither were the expectations high. Still it has all elements in place to keep the critics quiet, satiate the fans and common audience alike in the days ahead." He concluded the review saying, "Firefighters are supposed to douse the flames that eat everything it comes across, but this 'Fireman' will set fire to theatres for sure." Veeyen of Nowrunning.com stated that Fireman was a tribute to firefighters and that the film was "fairly good." Applauding the film's cast and performances, direction, cinematography, editing and score, but criticising the graphics works and the incompleteness in screenplay, Akhila Menon of Filmibeat.com gave a rating 2.5 out of 5 and wrote a verdict, "Kudos to team for materialising India's first fire force based movie. Overall, a partially accomplished mission." A reviewer of Indiaglitz.com said that "opens to a very shaky start" it has an engaging storyline and it is " one of the well made thrillers in recent Malayalam."

Pramod Thomas of The New Indian Express, however, said, "The movie throws cold water on the fire of expectations of an average spectator. The bland screenplay of the movie isn't helping either. The only saving grace of the film is that it tells a hitherto untold story of the heroics of firemen and deserves a salute for the same."

== Trivia ==
The film also dubbed into Tamil and Kannada. In the 2015 Telugu film Jil, a jailed terrorist reveals certain details of a terror plot that only the police and fire force would have naturally known, thus arousing suspicion. In Suddenly, a henchman arouses the suspicion of the police at the rail station by inadvertently referring to the 5 o'clock train, which happens to be a special train whose schedule is known only to the police. In both movies, a villain inadvertently reveals details that should be known only to the authorities.
