= Madhura Naranga =

Madhura naranga
- Film Poster
- Directed by: Sugeeth
- Screenplay by: Nishad Koya
- Story by: Nishad Koya; Salam Kottakkal
- Produced by: M.K Nazar; Stanly C.S
- Starring: Kunchacko Boban; Biju Menon; Neeraj Madhav; Parvathy Ratheesh
- Cinematography: Faisal Ali
- Edited by: V Saajan
- Music by: Sreejith-Sachin
- Production company: Good Line Productions
- Release date: 17 July 2015
- Running time: 155 min
- Country: India
- Language: Malayalam

Madhura Naranga is a 2015 Malayalam romantic family drama film written by Nishad Koya and Salam Kottakkal, directed by Sugeeth. The film says that it was adapted from a true incident. The film stars Kunchacko Boban, Biju Menon, Neeraj Madhav and debutante Parvathy Ratheesh in lead roles. The movie was well received by critics.

== Plot ==
Jeevan (Kunchacko Boban) and Salim (Biju Menon) are taxi drivers in UAE. They live in a small villa in Sharjah which they share with Kumar (Neeraj Madhav). Jeevan while on duty encounters Thamara Muthulingam (Parvathy Ratheesh) who runs into his taxi and asks him to drive. Jeevan soon senses something is wrong as she does not provide a destination and seems suspicious. He drops her off at a beach and asks her leave which she does. The next day he finds her at the same beach again and approaches her. She explains that she is a Sri Lankan Tamil orphan who was tricked into joining a dance bar in Dubai. One night her sponsor confronts her in the dressing room after she runs away from the dance stage. She hits him in the head with a bottle in panic and runs off which is when she gets into Jeevan's taxi.

Jeevan sympathizes with her and lets her stay in his villa. His roommates are initially against it but later on warms up to her while Jeevan falls in love with her. Salim digs into her sponsor's fate and finds out he is still hospitalized and the police is on the lookout for her. Jeevan speaks with a friend Ashraf (Mithun Ramesh) to arrange for an accommodation for Thamara who reluctantly agrees to let her stay with his female workers. One night during a labour checking, Thamara returns to the villa with Jeevan. They vigorously and passionately gets intimate. She then becomes pregnant and Jeevan arranges for her to stay in the villa. She delivers the baby at the villa itself with help of a friend's wife Deepa (Aparna Nair) who is a doctor.

Couple of years later, Jeevan meets with an accident and goes into a coma. Against his friends' wishes, Jeevan is transported to his hometown by a distant relative. At the same time, Thamara is arrested by the police at the behest of her sponsor and is later deported. Their infant son, Kannan, is sent to an orphanage while Salim is sentenced to six months imprisonment for aiding her illegally.

Sometime later, Jeevan who has now recovered arrives in Sri Lanka to find Thamara and is met by Salim. A London-based couple have shown interest in adopting Kannan. The only way to prevent this is if Jeevan and Thamara appear in the court together to receive him. Jeevan and Salim are not able to find Thamara and decide to return to UAE without her. On the way to the airport, they see a girl who has met with an accident surrounded by a crowd. The crowd stops their car and ask them to drop the bleeding girl at a nearby hospital. At the hospital, Jeevan finds Thamara taking care of other children. They are reunited and successfully get custody of Kannan from the UAE court.

== Cast ==
- Kunchacko Boban as Jeevan
- Biju Menon as Salim
- Neeraj Madhav as Kumar
- Parvathy Ratheesh as Thamara Muthulingam
- Suraj Venjaramoodu as Kasargode Ibrahim (Icha)
- Aparna Nair as Gynaecologist Deepa
- Mithun Ramesh as Ashraf
- Sadiq as Jamali
- Ganja Karuppu as a Sri Lankan Tamil tourist guide
- Shivaji Guruvayoor as Jeevan's uncle in a cameo role
- Jaise Jose As Anil

== Reception ==
Madhura Naranga opened to highly positive reviews from critics. Manorama Online said that "Madhura Naranga is one of the most outstanding movies in the non-classic genre". The Times of India gave the film 3.5 out of 5 and stated "This Madhura Naranga would be a delicious pick for those who are looking for a movie with its layers of tastes well balanced". Sify gave it 3 out of 5 and wrote "If your idea of entertainment is a story coated with some melodrama, this one is a nice option".

== Soundtrack ==
The film's background score and music is composed by Sreejith-Sachin (Yuvvh).

| # | Title | Singer(s) | Lyricist |
|---|---|---|---|
| 1 | "Oru Naal Ini Naam" | Haricharan; Sooraj Santhosh | Santhosh Varma |
| 2 | "Kankankalil" | Vijesh Gopal; Swetha Mohan; Aswin | Rajeev Nair |
| 3 | "Melle Vannu Konjiyo" | Sooraj Santhosh; Roshni Suresh | VR Santhosh |
| 4 | "Aarum Kaanathe" | Sreejith Edavana; Reshma Menon | Sreekumar Nair |
| 5 | "Ee Koottil" | Madhu Balakrishnan; Ranjith Govind; Afla Subhana; Latha Krishna | Rajeev Nair |
| 6 | "Oh Thirayukayano" | Shashwat Singh; Roshni Suresh | Santhosh Varma |
| 7 | "Vazhvom Thazhvom" | Shashwat Singh; Roshni Suresh | Vivek |
