= Melle (film) =

- മെല്ലെ
- Directed by: Binu Ulahannan
- Screenplay by: Binu Ulahannan
- Produced by: Joney C. David
- Starring: Amith Chakalakkal
- Cinematography: Santhosh Anima
- Edited by: Sunesh Sebastian
- Music by: Vijay Jacob
- Production company: Vista VFX
- Distributed by: Triyega Productions
- Release date: 20 October 2017 (India)
- Running time: 115 min
- Country: India
- Language: Malayalam

Melle is Indian Malayalam romantic film written and directed by Binu P. Ulahannan. The film is produced by Triyega productions and stars Amith Chakalakkal and Thanuja Karthik in lead roles with Joju George, Joy Mathew, P. Balachandran, Vivek Bhaskar Haridas in supporting roles. Cinematography is done by Santhosh Anima, Jimmy jib operated by Webly, Aison & Chester editing by Sunesh Sebastian, music by Donald Mathew and Vijay Jacob, film score by Vijay Jacob. Film is produced by Johny C. David under the banner of Triyega Productions. Muzik 247 is the music label.

== Cast ==
- Amith Chakalakkal as Dr.Reji
- Thanuja Karthik as Uma
- Joju George
- Joy Mathew
- P. Balachandran
- Karthik Vishnu
- Vivek Bhaskar Haridas
- Krishnaprabha

== Production ==
Melle is directed by Binu Ulahannan and produced by Johny C. David. Starring Joju George, Joy Mathew, P. Balachandran, Vivek Bhaskar, Haridas, Krishnaprabha, Meenakshi Rameshbabu, Ambika Mohan, Haris Beegam.

== Music ==
The music of the film was composed by Donald Mathew and Vijay Jacob. Soundtrack consists four tracks. The track "Hridayam" is sung by the singer Vijay Yesudas and another song "Konji Konji Pookum" was sung by Shweta Mohan.

Soundtrack
No.	Title	Singer(s)	Length
1.	"Konji Konji Pookum"	Shweta Mohan	5:09
2.	"Punjapadathe"	Vaikom Vijayalakshmi	2:56
3.	"Hridayam"	Vijay Yesudas	2:57
4.	"Melle Manasinullil"	Shweta Mohan	4:31

== Release ==
Melle released in theaters on 20 October 2017.
