= Amith Chakalakkal =

Indian actor

- Born: 13 August 1985 (age 40)
- Occupations: Actor; Model
- Years active: 2013–present

Amith Chakalakkal Saju (born 13 August 1985), known as Amith Chakalakkal, is an Indian actor in Malayalam cinema. He lives in Kochi, Kerala. He is known for his roles in the movie Honey Bee (2013) and Vaarikkuzhiyile Kolapathakam (2019).

== Early life and education ==
Chakalakkal was born on 13 August 1985. He studied in Rajagiri High School, Kalamassery, Kochi. He has a bachelor's degree in mechanical engineering. He paved his way into modeling through the TV reality show Mammootty, The Best Actor Award, in Asianet.

== Career ==
Chakalakkal was first featured in an album, Atma, in the song "Mounam Melle" along with Pushpa Mathew. He broke into films after his stint on the reality show Mammootty, the best actor award.

He first appeared in ABCD as a junior artist. His first character role in Jean Paul Lal's directorial debut, Honey Bee. He played the role of Nizam Rowther in the 2014 Indian Malayalam-language period thriller film, Iyobinte Pusthakam. The following year, he acted in Lal Bahadur Shastri and Sapthamashree Thaskaraha. He was well received and appreciated for his portrayal of Prince Chakkalakkal in the movie C/O Saira Banu. He made his first lead role in the movie Melle. In 2018, he performed a key role in Jayasurya-starrer Pretham 2. In 2019, he starred in the lead role in the thriller movie Vaarikkuzhiyile Kolapaathakam, with his portrayal of a young hotheaded priest earning him praise.

== Filmography ==
Key
| † | Denotes films that have not yet been released |

| Year | Title | Role | Notes |
|---|---|---|---|
| 2013 | Honey Bee | Martin | Debut Film |
| 2013 | ABCD: American-Born Confused Desi | Police Officer | Cameo Appearance |
| 2014 | Masala Republic | Ags Officer Firoz | |
| 2014 | Hi I'm Tony | CI Narasimhan | |
| 2014 | Sapthamashree Thaskaraha | Nobel's Son | |
| 2014 | Iyobinte Pusthakam | Nizam Rawthar | |
| 2014 | Lal Bahadur Shastri | Arjun | |
| 2014 | Kranthi | Stalin | Unreleased |
| 2016 | King Liar | Host of Max Asian Beauty Contest | Cameo Appearance |
| 2016 | Kolumittayi | Vipin | |
| 2017 | Honey Bee 2: Celebrations | Martin | |
| 2017 | C/O Saira Banu | Prince Chakkalakkal | |
| 2017 | Honeybee 2.5 | As Himself | |
| 2017 | Melle | Dr.Reji | Lead role |
| 2018 | Kayamkulam Kochunni | Mammad | |
| 2018 | Pretham 2 | Tapas Menon | |
| 2019 | Vaarikkuzhiyile Kolapathakam | Ex-CPO Fr. Vincent Kombana | Lead role |
| 2021 | Yuvam | Adv. Aby | Lead role |
| 2021 | Djibouti | Louie | Lead Role |
| 2021 | Aaha | Ani | |
| 2022 | Theru | Arjun | |
| 2023 | Santhosham | Gireesh | |
| 2023 | Praavu | Aravindan | |
| 2024 | Chithini | | |
| 2026 | Muthassi | Rajan | ZEE5 series |
| TBA | Two Stroke † | TBA | Filming |
| TBA | Passport † | TBA | Filming |
