= Uppum Mulakum =

Indian sitcom

- Genre: Sitcom
- Created by: R. Unnikrishnan
- Written by: Suresh Babu; Afsal Karunagappally; Jacky S Kumar; Sreerag R. Nambiar
- Directed by: Suhil Raj A S. Afsal Abdul Latheef; Rajesh Thalachira; Pradeep Madhav; R. Unnikrishnan
- Starring: Biju Sopanam; Nisha Sarangh; Rishi S Kumar; Juhi Rustagi; Al Sabith; Shivani Menon; Baby Ameya
- Country of origin: India
- Original language: Malayalam
- No. of seasons: 3
- No. of episodes: 2400+

Production
- Producer: Flowers TV Production
- Cinematography: Anoop Kattakada; Midhun Muraleedharan; Sudeesh CP; Sajeev KV; Amal MK; Nandhu V
- Editors: Satheesh Kumar B Ranjith PR; Abhilash Elikatoor; Amal Tom
- Camera setup: Multi-camera
- Running time: 30 minutes

Original release
- Network: Flowers TV
- Release: 14 December 2015 – present

Related
- Erivum Puliyum

Uppum Mulakum (transl. Salt and Pepper) is an Indian Malayalam-language sitcom that premiered on Flowers TV on 14 December 2015. The series was created by R. Unnikrishnan, who also directed the first two seasons. It follows the daily lives of Balachandran Thampi, his wife Neelima, and their children.

The series stars Biju Sopanam, Nisha Sarangh, Rishi S. Kumar, Juhi Rustagi, Al Sabith, Shivani Menon, and Baby Ameya, who joined the cast in 2018. The third season was directed by Afsal Abdul Latheef and later by Suhil Raj A. S. Parvathy Ayyappadas joined the series in 2023 portraying Diya, the wife of Vishnu; both characters later exited following the conclusion of the second season. In 2025, Sidharth Prabu joined the cast in the third season as Sidhu, the husband of Lakshmi (Lechu), following the character's return from Dubai.

The series completed 1,000 episodes in 2019 and crossed 2,000 episodes on 27 June 2025, becoming the longest-running Malayalam sitcom. Juhi Rustagi exited the series in 2019 after episode 1,013 and later returned in the second season.

Uppum Mulakum received the Kerala State Television Award for Best Comedy Show in 2017.

== Series overview ==
| Series | Episodes | Originally released | |
| Series | Episodes | First released | Last released |
|---|---|---|---|
| 1 | 1206 | 14 December 2015 | 15 January 2021 |
| 2 | 461 | 13 June 2022 | 26 February 2024 |
| 3 | 750+ | 24 June 2024 | Ongoing |

== Plot summary ==
=== Season 1 ===
==== Family setup ====
Uppum Mulakum centers on the Thampi family, also known as Paramada Veedu. Balu, an electronics technician, and his wife Neelima (Neelu), an accountant, live with their five children: Vishnu (Mudiyan), Lakshmi (Lechu), Keshav (Keshu), Shivani (Shiva), and Parvathy (Parukutty).

- Vishnu (Mudiyan): The eldest son, a passionate dancer, who overcomes academic failure to secure a job at an ad agency, later transitioning to banking.
- Lakshmi (Lechu): Creative and sociable, she pursues a B.Com. degree and marries Sidharth in episode 1011.
- Keshu & Shiva: School-going siblings known for their mischief and strong bond.
- Parukutty: The youngest, born in episode 604, adored by all.

==== Extended family & neighbors ====
Recurring characters include Balu's brother Surendran, cousin Rema and her husband Jayanthan, Neelu's brother Sreekuttan, and neighbors like Chandran and Kanakam. Occasional episodes are set in other family homes in Neyyattinkara and Piravom, adding cultural flavor.

=== Season 2 ===
The season shows Balu promoted to supervisor, Neelu advancing in her career, and Lechu returning home. Keshu begins tutoring, and Parukutty starts nursery.

Vishnu elopes with Diya, leading to family conflict. Diya's parents, Ram and Haimavati, oppose the union due to business interests. Eventually, tensions ease, and Diya becomes a director in her father's company. Lechu finds recognition for her poetry through Ram's publishing house. The season ends with Diya moving to Bangalore to join Vishnu.

=== Season 3 ===
Set a few years later, Neelu becomes a company manager, Keshu is in his second year of BA Malayalam, and Shiva studies architecture in Chennai. The season opens with Balu and Neelu's 30th wedding anniversary and the arrival of Neelu's brother Sreekuttan and his wife Gouri.

Following the exit of key characters Balu, Neelu, and Sreekuttan, the focus shifts to Keshu and his relationships.

==== Keshu & Merlin ====
Keshu, carefree and humorous, meets Merlin, his responsible and grounded opposite. Their evolving relationship brings a balance of humor and life lessons. Keshu dreams of a simple life in his ancestral home, which others dismiss as idealistic.

Merlin is the daughter of businessman Vincent Gomes, from a Catholic business family. Complications arise when Aleena Francis, Keshu's childhood crush (and Merlin's cousin), enters the story unaware of his current relationship. The narrative centers on the resulting love triangle.

==== Sidhu’s return from Dubai ====
Sidhu returns from Dubai after a long four years and reunites with his wife Lachu and daughter Kallu. Uppum Mulakum returns to its earlier glory with Bhavani Amma(Neelu's mother), Kanakam(Balu's relative), Kalyani(Lachu's daughter) in more prominent roles.

== Cast ==
=== Main cast ===
Uppum Mulakum cast and characters
| Actor | Character | Season | | |
| Actor | Character | 1 | 2 | 3 |
|---|---|---|---|---|
| Biju Sopanam (2015-2024) | Shoolamkudi Veetil Balachandran "Balu" Thampi | Main | Main | Main |
| Nisha Sarangh (2015-2024) | Neelima "Neelu" Balachandran Thampi | Main | Main | Main |
| Rishi S Kumar (2015-2023) | Vishnu "Mudiyan" Balachandran Thampi | Main | Main | |
| Juhi Rustagi (2015-present) | Lakshmi "Lachu" Balachandran Thampi | Main | Main | Main |
| Al Sabith (2015-present) | Keshav "Keshu" Balachandran Thampi | Main | Main | Main |
| Shivani Menon (2015-present) | Shivani "Shiva" Balachandran Thampi | Main | Main | Main |
| Baby Ameya (2018-present) | Parvathy "Paru" Balachandran Thampi | Main | Main | Main |
| Parvathy Das (2022-2023) | Diya | | Main | |
| Gouri Unnimaya (2024-2026) | Gouri Sreekuttan | | | Main |
| K.P.A.C Santha (2015-2019) / Kaladevi (2022-present) | Chonarathala Bhavani Amma | Recurring | Recurring | Main |
| Rohini Rahul (2015-present) | Kanakam | Recurring | | Main |
| Nandhootty (2024-present) | Kalyani / Kallu | | | Main |
| Dain Davis(2019)/ Sidharth Prabhu (2025-present) | Sidharth/Sidhu | Recurring | | Main |

=== Other cast ===
Additional cast and characters from Uppum Mulakum
| Actor | Character | Season | | |
| Actor | Character | 1 | 2 | 3 |
|---|---|---|---|---|
| KPAC Rajendran (2015-2025,deceased) | Padavalam Veetil Kuttan Pillai | Recurring | Recurring | Recurring |
| Kottayam Ramesh (2015-present) | Shoolamkudi Veetil Madhavan Thampi | Recurring | Recurring | Recurring |
| Manohari Joy (2015-present) | Sharada Thampi | Recurring | Recurring | Recurring |
| Binoj Kulathoor (2015-present) | Shoolamkudi Veetil Surendran Thampi | Recurring | Recurring | Recurring |
| S. P. Sreekumar (2015-2021, 2024) | Sreekuttan Pillai (Kuttumaman) | Recurring | | Recurring |
| Shobi Thilakan (2015-2020) | Shoolamkudi Veetil Rajendran Thampi | Recurring | | |
| Muraleedharan Pangodu (2015-present) | Shankaran Thampi | Recurring | Recurring | Recurring |
| Varsha Abhay (2015-2023) | Rema | Recurring | Recurring | |
| Suresh Babu (2015-present) | Bhasi | Recurring | Recurring | Recurring |
| Anil Perumpalam (2015-present) | Jayanthan | Recurring | Recurring | Recurring |
| Arun G (2025-present) | Shibu / Chemical Shibu | | | Recurring |
| Jiji Kalamandir (2015-2021) | Auto Chandran | Recurring | | |
| Sajitha Betti (2023-2024) | Valiyaveettil Haimavathy Ram Kumar | | Recurring | |
| Rajesh Hebbar (2023-2024) | Ram Kumar | | Recurring | |
| Aneena Mariya (2024-present) | Merlin | | | Recurring |
| Veena Nair (2026-present) | Seetha(Sidhu mother) | | | Recurring |
| Rajesh Paravoor (2026-present) | Janardhanan ( Sidhu father) | | | Recurring |

Kumar Sethu 2026 Vincent Gomez (Aleenas Father)

=== Guest(s) ===
This is a list of the celebrities who have made guest appearances in the show.

| Actor | Character | Episode no. |
|---|---|---|
| Noorin Shereef | Susmitha | |
| Bhagath Manuel | Himself | 288 |
| Nirmal Palazhi | Himself | 288 |
| Niyas Backer | Himself | 288 |
| Bineesh Bastin | Keerikadan Sabu | 558 |
| Nandini Nair | Herself | |
| Rajisha Vijayan | June | 792 |
| Mithun Ramesh | Jimmy | 994 |
| Divya Pillai | Jancy | 994 |
| Shane Nigam | Akkar | 1008 |
| Tini Tom | Alex | 1051 |
| Vinay Forrt | Roy | 1051 |
| Srinda | Susan | 1051 |
| Kalabhavan Prajod | Himself | Onam Special |
| Vinay Forrt | Soman | 349 (Season 2) |
| Mukesh | Philips | 391 (Season 2) |
| Noble Babu Thomas | Basil | 391 (Season 2) |
| Navani Devanand | Blessy | 391 (Season 2) |
| P.P. Kunhikrishnan | Magistrate | 1 (Season 3) |
| Dharmajan | Himself | 455 ( Season 3 ) |
| Jinil Rex | Renju | 655 & 656 (Season 3) |
| Jivin Rex | Kunju | 655 & 656 (Season 3) |

== Production ==
=== Season 1 ===
==== Casting ====
Nisha Sarang was cast as Neelima while hosting the cookery show Kuttikkalavara on Flowers. Apart from her, the main cast were newcomers to television. Theatre actor Biju Sopanam, who had previously worked with director R. Unnikrishnan in the comedy series Back Benchers, was offered the lead role of Balachandran Thampi. Inspired by Unnikrishnan's Marimayam, Biju was keen to work on realistic roles, making Uppum Mulakum his second TV appearance and first lead role.

Rishi S. Kumar was selected for the role of Vishnu after Unnikrishnan saw him on the dance reality show D 4 Dance, following a recommendation from his son. Child actors Al Sabith and Shivani Menon, both contestants on Kuttikkalavara, were cast as Keshu and Shivani, respectively. Although Shivani is a month older than Sabith in real life, the show portrays the reverse. Juhi Rustagi, a friend of Unnikrishnan's son, was cast as Lachu after meeting him at a birthday party.

Biju's younger brother Binoj plays his on-screen brother Surendran Thampi, while Biju's daughter Gouri Lakshmi portrays Surendran's daughter Kanmani. The series was filmed at a house named Paramada Veedu in Vazhakkala, Kochi. In July 2018, S.J. Sinu replaced Unnikrishnan as director, later succeeded by Pradheep Madhav.

The title theme music for Uppum Mulakum 3.0 was composed and sung by playback singer Praseeda Kalarikkal, with rhythm programming by Anagha Mohan.

==== Decline in Viewership and Cancellation ====
Uppum Mulakum experienced a ratings dip following Juhi Rustagi's exit in January 2020. After resuming production post the COVID-19 pandemic, a new character, Pooja Jayaram, was introduced. Still, the show failed to regain its earlier popularity. Around the same time, Flowers TV launched a new sitcom, Chakkappazham, in August 2020. The final episode of Uppum Mulakum aired on 15 January 2021, totalling 1206 episodes. While initially described as a hiatus, it was later confirmed by lead actors Biju Sopanam and Nisha Sarang in March 2021 that the show had been officially cancelled.

=== Season 2 ===
On 1 June 2022, during an episode of Flowers Oru Kodi, it was announced that Uppum Mulakum would return for a second season, premiering on 13 June 2022. A teaser was released on television and social media, confirming the return of original director R. Unnikrishnan and actress Juhi Rustagi.

The premiere episode of Season 2 became the top trending topic on YouTube. However, the season faced setbacks after Rishi S. Kumar (Mudiyan) left unexpectedly following a storyline introducing his character's marriage. The show's tone shifted significantly, incorporating horror and thriller elements, which received mostly negative reviews by audiences. This period, marked by a slower narrative and new characters, was referred to by fans as the "dark phase" of the series.

Rishi later cited creative differences and director R. Unnikrishnan's working style as reasons for his departure. The second season concluded on 26 February 2024, reportedly due to scheduling conflicts with the cast.

=== Season 3 ===
The third season premiered on 24 June 2024, with most of the main cast returning, except Rishi S. Kumar and Parvathy Ayyapadas. S. P. Sreekumar reprised his role from Season 1. New additions included Gouri Unnimaya as Sreekuttan's wife, Gouri, and child actor Nandhootty as Kallu, Lachu and Sidhu's daughter.

The season was initially directed by Afsal Abdul Latheef (episodes 1–172), followed by Suhil Raj A. S. from episode 173 onward. Writing credits were primarily shared between Suresh Babu and Script Lorry, with cinematography by Midhun Muraleedharan, Sajeev K. V., Amal M. K., and Nandhu V., and editing by Abhilash Elikatoor and Amal Tom.

Following a sexual assault case involving a lead actress, the accused actors Biju Sopanam and S. P. Sreekumar exited the show. Nisha Sarangh also quit the show. The current storyline centers on the younger characters, Keshu, Parukkutty, Lechu, and Shivani.

Veteran actor KPAC Rajendran, who portrayed Padavalam Kuttanpillai, died on 31 July 2025 while undergoing treatment for kidney-related ailments at Vandanam Medical College Hospital, Alappuzha.

In October 2025, Siddharth Prabhu joined the show as Siddharth/Siddhu, replacing Dain Davis. However, following his arrest for allegedly driving while drunk and causing a fatal accident in which a pedestrian lost their life, he has been removed from the show. But on 14 February 2026, he returned to the show.

In June 2026, Gouri Unnimaya announced her exit from the show, citing her plans to focus on the next stage of her career and her studies.

== Reception ==
Uppum Mulakum is one of the most popular sitcoms in Malayalam. The show has one of the biggest fan base for a Malayalam TV show and is acclaimed by the audience for its realistic touch.

=== Critical response ===
Indian Express said: "Uppum Mulakum presents the simple things in daily life without losing its originality. Behind the show's popularity is that the audience can feel that the house and its family members may have been living somewhere else in the real life".

== Awards ==
Flowers Comedy Awards 2016

1. Most popular serial
2. Best onscreen pair

Flowers TV Awards 2017

1. Most popular serial
2. Best actor – Biju Sopanam

Mangalam TV Awards 2017

1. Best comedian – Biju Sopanam
2. Best comedian female - Nisha Sarang
3. Best child actor - Shivani Menon, Al Sabith

Kerala State Television Awards 2017

1. Best comedy series
2. Best comedian – Biju Sopanam
3. Best comedian (Special jury) - Nisha Sarang

Adoor Bhasi Memorial Awards 2017

1. Most popular actress - Nisha Sarang

North American Film Awards

1. Best actress (Television) - Nisha Sarang

Janmabhoomi Awards 2019

1. Best child artist - Al Sabith

Kerala State Television Awards 2020

1. Special jury award – Shivani Menon

Kerala Vision Television Awards 2026

1. Best Comedy Actress – Juhi Rustagi

== Controversies ==
In July 2018, Main Actress raised allegations of harassment against the serial director in season 1, after which the Kerala Women's Commission registered a case against him. Later, she decided to continue in the serial after the channel assured that the director will be replaced.

In February 2020, the main cast actors had some issues in the set against the scriptwriter due to which they all walked away, much to the disappointment of the fans. Sooner than later, all the issues were solved by the changing of the scriptwriter and the crew was back in action.

In December 2024, a sexual assault complaint has been filed against leading actors, Biju Sopanam and S. P. Sreekumar. The complaint, lodged by a female actress, alleges that she was assaulted during the shoot of the series. One of the accused is alleged to have assaulted the actress, while the other is accused of threatening her to prevent her from speaking out. The case was initially registered by the Infopark Police and has since been transferred to the Thrikkakara Police for further investigation. Thrikkakara Police handed over the case to special investigation team (SIT) which has been formed after Hema committee reports.

== Adaptations ==
Flowers TV subsequently started a behind-the-scenes programme of Uppum Mulakum named Uppile Mulaku, which was hosted by Nandini Nair. Uppum Mulakum dubbed 10 episodes into Tamil as Uppum Karavum on Flowers' Tamil YouTube channel.

== Reboot ==
In October 2021, Zee Keralam started developing a new spiritual reboot of the sitcom, with the idea of reimagining the original series. The show titled Erivum Puliyum featuring the actors of the Uppum Mulakum playing new characters started airing from 17 January 2022 The show went off-air on 13 May 2022 due to low TRP Ratings and negative reviews from audiences.

== Animated version ==
An animated version of Uppum Mulakum aired from 1 April to 15 April 2025 consisting of 5 episodes on the Flowers Comedy and BMG Animations YouTube channels. It is co-created by Flowers TV and BMG Animations and produced by Flowers TV, the series features the same characters from the original sitcom but is primarily aimed at children, with a presentation style tailored to younger audiences.

== See also ==
- List of television programs by episode count
- List of longest-running Indian television series
