= 50th Kerala State Film Awards =

Kerala State Film Awards

- Awarded for: Honouring achievements in Malayalam films
- Date: 13 October 2020
- Location: Thiruvananthapuram
- Country: India
- Presented by: Kerala State Chalachitra Academy
- First award: 1969

Highlights
- Most wins: Kumbalangi Nights (4)
- Website: http://www.keralafilm.com

The 50th Kerala State Film Awards, presented by the Kerala State Chalachitra Academy were announced by the Minister for Cultural Affairs, A. K. Balan in Thiruvananthapuram on 13 October 2020. A total of 119 films were considered for various categories.

== Writing category ==
=== Jury ===
• V. Rajakrishnan (chairman)
• P. G. Sadanandan	• T. Anithakumary
• C. Ajoy (member and secretary)

=== Awards ===
All award recipients receive a cash prize, certificate and statuette.

Name of award	Title of work	Awardee(s)	Cash prize
Best Book on Cinema	Cinema Sandarbhangal: Cinema Shaalayum Keraleeya Pothumandalavum	P. K. Rajasekharan	₹30,000
Best Article on Cinema	Madamballiyile Manorogi; Komali Melkkai Nedunna Kalam	Bipin Chandran	₹20,000

=== Special Jury Mention ===
All recipients receive a certificate and statuette.

Name of award	Title of work	Awardee(s)	Type of work
Special Mention	Cinema: Mukhavum Mukhammoodiyum	Rajesh M. R.	Book
Special Mention	Jellikkettinte Charithra Paadangal	Sebastian Joseph; Sudhi C. J.	Article

== Film category ==
=== Jury ===
• Madhu Ambat (chairman)
• Salim Ahamed	• Abrid Shine
• Vipin Mohan	• L. Bhoominathan
• S. Radhakrishnan	• Lathika
• Jomol	• Benyamin
• C. Ajoy (member and secretary)

=== Awards ===
All award recipients receive a cash prize, certificate and statuette.

Name of award	Title of film	Awardee(s)	Cash prize
Best Film	Vasanthi	Directors: Shinos Rahman, Sajas Rahman	₹100,000 each
Best Film	Vasanthi	Producer: Siju Wilson	₹200,000
Second Best Film	Kenjira	Director: Manoj Kana	₹150,000
Second Best Film	Kenjira	Producer: Manoj Kana	₹150,000
Best Director	Jallikattu	Lijo Jose Pellissery	₹200,000
Best Actor	Android Kunjappan Version 5.25; Vikruthi	Suraj Venjaramoodu	₹100,000
Best Actress	Biriyaani	Kani Kusruti	₹100,000
Best Character Actor	Kumbalangi Nights	Fahadh Faasil	₹50,000
Best Character Actress	Vasanthi	Swasika	₹50,000
Best Child Artist	Sullu; Kallanottam	Vasudev Sajeesh Marar (Male category)	₹50,000
Best Child Artist	Nani	Catherine (Female category)	₹50,000
Best Story	Vari: The Sentence	Shahul Aliyar	₹50,000
Best Cinematography	Idam; Kenjira	Pratap P. Nair	₹50,000
Best Screenplay (Original)	Vasanthi	Shinos Rahman, Sajas Rahman	₹25,000 each
Best Screenplay (Adaptation)	Thottappan	P. S. Rafeeque	₹50,000
Best Lyrics	Sathyam Paranja Viswasikkuvo ("Pularippoo Pole Chirichu")	Sujesh Hari	₹50,000
Best Music Director (song)	Kumbalangi Nights (All songs)	Sushin Shyam	₹50,000
Best Music Director (score)	Vrithakrithiyilulla Chathuram	Ajmal Hasbulla	₹50,000
Best Male Singer	Kettyolaanu Ente Malakha ("Aathmaavile Vaanangalil")	Najim Arshad	₹50,000
Best Female Singer	Kolaambi ("Parayatharike Vanna Pranayame")	Madhushree Narayan	₹50,000
Best Editor	Ishq	Kiran Das	₹50,000
Best Art Director	Kumbalangi Nights; Android Kunjappan Version 5.25	Jyothish Shankar	₹50,000
Best Sync Sound	Nani	Harikumar Madhavan Nair	₹50,000
Best Sound Mixing	Jallikattu	Kannan Ganapathi	₹50,000
Best Sound Design	Unda; Ishq	Sreesankar Gopinath, Vishnu Govind	₹25,000 each
Best Processing Lab/Colourist	Idam	Rang Rays Media Works / Liju Prabhakar	₹50,000
Best Makeup Artist	Helen	Ranjith Ambady	₹50,000
Best Costume Designer	Kenjira	Ashokan Alappuzha	₹50,000
Best Dubbing Artist	Lucifer (Character: Bobby); Marakkar: Arabikadalinte Simham (Character: Ananthan)	Vineeth (Male category)	₹50,000
Best Dubbing Artist	Kamala (Character: Kamala)	Shruti Ramachandran (Female category)	₹50,000
Best Choreography	Marakkar: Arabikadalinte Simham	Brinda, Prasanna Sujit	₹25,000 each
Best Film with Popular Appeal and Aesthetic Value	Kumbalangi Nights	Producers: Fahadh Faasil, Nazriya Nazim, Dileesh Pothan, Syam Pushkaran	₹25,000 each
Best Film with Popular Appeal and Aesthetic Value	Kumbalangi Nights	Director: Madhu C. Narayanan	₹100,000
Best Debut Director	Android Kunjappan Version 5.25	Ratheesh Balakrishnan Poduval	₹100,000
Best Children's Film	Nani	Producer: Shaji Mathew	₹300,000
Best Children's Film	Nani	Director: Samvid Anand	₹100,000
Special Jury Award	Marakkar: Arabikadalinte Simham	Sidharth Priyadarshan (awarded for Visual Effects)	₹50,000

=== Special Jury Mention ===
All recipients receive a certificate and statuette.

Name of award	Title of film	Awardee(s)	Awarded for
Special Mention	Shyamaragam	V. Dakshinamoorthy	Music Direction
Special Mention	Moothon	Nivin Pauly	Acting
Special Mention	Helen	Anna Ben	Acting
Special Mention	Thottappan	Priyamvada Krishnan	Acting
