= Manohari Joy =

Indian actress and theatre artist

- Born: Thumboli, Alappuzha, Kerala, India
- Occupations: Actress; Theatre artist Dancer
- Years active: 2015–present

Manohari Joy is an Indian actress and theatre artist who works primarily in Malayalam films and television.

== Early life and background ==
Manohari Joy was born in Thumboli, Alappuzha, Kerala. She trained in classical dance at Swathi Thirunal Music Academy, Thiruvananthapuram, and worked as a dance teacher at Chettikulangara High School for eight years before transitioning into theatre and screen acting.

== Career ==
Manohari performed in over 36 professional Malayalam dramas across 18 theatre groups over forty years.

She gained public recognition through the popular TV sitcom Uppum Mulakum, where she played Sarada.

She made her feature film debut in Kettyolaanu Ente Malakha (2019), where her performance as Eliyamma received appreciation. She later played acclaimed supporting roles in several films, including Bheeshma Parvam (2022), Malikappuram (2022), and Christopher (2023).

In 2022, she appeared in Autorickshawkarante Bharya, a film adaptation of M. Mukundan's story.

She was also featured in Kachi, a film that had a digital release.

In 2024, she played Gracy in the suspense thriller film Sookshmadarshini.

She also appeared in the political thriller Swargathile Katturumbu.

== Filmography ==
=== Films ===
Year	Title	Role	Notes	Ref.
2019	Kettyolaanu Ente Malakha	Eliyamma	Film debut	
2021	Aarkkariyam	Augustine’s mother		
2021	Nayattu	Praveen’s mother		
2021	Cheraathukal		Anthology film Segment:Clara	
2021	Kachi			
2022	Meppadiyan	Amma		
2022	In	Grace		
2022	Autorickshawkarante Bharya	Sajeevan's mother		
2022	Puzhu	Kuttan’s Mother		
2022	Bheeshma Parvam	Annamma		
2022	Malikappuram	Ajayan's mother		
2023	Christopher	Agnes		
2023	Article 21			
2023	Antony			
2024	Qalb	Thumbi's grandmother		
2024	Swargathile Katturumbu			
2024	Swargam	Elsamma		
2024	Oru Kattil Oru Muri			
2024	Panchayath Jetty			
2024	Nadikar			
2024	Her	Grandmother		
2024	Sookshmadarshini	Gracy (Ammachi)		
2025	Mr & Mrs Bachelor	Siddhu's mother		
2025	Diés Iraé	Madhu's mother		
2025	Athibheekara Kaamukan	Arjun’s mother		
2026	Koodothram			

=== Television ===
- Uppum Mulakum (2015 – present) – Sarada
- Manorathangal (2024) – Muthassi
- Inspection Bungalow (2025) - Vishnu's mother
