= Article 21 =

Article 21 may refer to:

- Article 21 of the Constitution of India
- Article 21 (film), 2023
