= Pratap P. Nair =

Indian cinematographer

Pratap P Nair
- Born: Trivandrum
- Education: Film and Television Institute of India, Pune
- Occupation: Cinematographer
- Years active: 2002- present
- Parent(s): G. Prabhakaran Nair & Sambhavi Devi

Pratap. P. Nair born in Thiruvananthapuram the capital city of Kerala, Pratap is a cinematographer based in Kerala. Pratap attended Film and Television Institute of India, Pune and graduated in the year 2004. After graduating from FTII, Pratap moved to Mumbai to pursue a career in cinematography. He is best known for films like Mundrothuruth, August Club and Reti. He worked in film production jobs in Mumbai, Hyderabad and Chennai, including associate cameraman, Camera Assistant and Camera Operator. A few among his various other achievements and recognition's are National award, non feature section in the year 2002, UGC national award for best documentary direction in 2005, film critics award (television) 2012. Pratap has worked as Director of Photography for many Malayalam films and five Marathi films. Pratap has to his credit, more than fifty documentaries, short films and TV commercials and continues to work as a Director of Photography splitting his time between Mumbai, Kolkata and Trivandrum.

== Filmography ==
=== Feature films ===
Year	Film	Director	Language
2007	Kaliyorukkam	S Sunil	Malayalam
2009	Natch tuchaz lagin hai	Milind Shinde	Marathi
2010	Bhakthajanangalude Sradhakku	Priyanandanan	Malayalam
2011	Gulam bhegam badsha	Raju firke	Marathi
2012	August Club	K. B. Venu	Malayalam
2015	Mundrothuruth	Manu	Malayalam
2016	Reti	Suhas Bhosle	Marathi
2017	Re Raya	Milind shinde	Marathi
2018	Idam	Jaya Jose Raj	Malayalam
2019	Kenjira	Manoj Kana	Malayalam
2021	Aa Mukham	Abhilash Purushothaman	Malayalam
2022	Khedda	Manoj Kana	Malayalam
2022	Station 5	Prashant kanathur	Malayalam
2025	Fado	Sreevalsan J. Menon	Malayalam

=== Short films ===
Year	Film	Director	Language
2018	Catharsis (Silencing Revelations)	Indira Zen	Malayalam
2017	Oru raathriyude kooli	Madhupal	Malayalam
2013	Oru yathrayil	Priyanandanan	Malayalam
2012	Manjupole	Prasanth Kanathur	Malayalam
2010	Aval	Prasanth Kanathur	Malayalam

== Awards ==
- Kerala State Film Award for Best Cinematography for Idam and Kenjira (2018 film)|Idam and Kenjira in the year 2019.
