= Voice of Sathyanathan =

2023 Indian film

- Official poster
- Directed by: Rafi
- Written by: Rafi
- Produced by: Badhusha N. M.; Shinoy Mathew; Dileep; Rajan Chirayil
- Starring: Dileep; Joju George; Veena Nandakumar; Jagapathi Babu; Siddique
- Cinematography: Swaroop Philip; Jithin Stanislaus
- Edited by: Shameer Muhammed
- Music by: Ankit Menon
- Production companies: Pen & Paper Creations; Badushaa Cinemas; Graand Production
- Distributed by: Grand Production
- Release date: 28 July 2023
- Running time: 135 minutes
- Country: India
- Language: Malayalam

Voice of Sathyanathan is a 2023 Indian Malayalam crime comedy thriller film written and directed by Rafi. The film stars Dileep in the title role, along with Joju George, Veena Nandakumar, Jagapathi Babu, Siddique and Johny Antony in prominent roles.

Principal photography commenced on 15 October 2021 in Kochi. The film was shot in Kerala, Mumbai, Delhi, Rajasthan and Hyderabad. The filming was wrapped up on 21 September 2022.

Initially set to release on 14 July 2023, Voice of Sathyanathan was theatrically released on 28 July 2023. The film was the 8th highest grossing Malayalam film of 2023

== Plot ==
Sathyanathan is the owner of a furniture shop and gets into a lot of trouble because of his uncontrollable tongue. He has a rivalry with his neighbour Tabala Varkeychan and the panchayat president. One morning, he wakes up to find police on his Verandah who are calling him to the police station. An officer interrogates him with a hidden webcam on the officer's table; the webcam live feeds to another computer in another room in the police station. The officer asks Sathyanathan about his rivalry with the panchayat president. While Sathyanathan is explaining about the rivalry, the DYSP in the other room translates the interrogation to an official, and they interpret Sathyanathan's threats to the President of India, who is scheduled to visit their town, instead of the panchayat president, whom Sathyanathan has been irritating. Sathyanathan gets sent into another interrogation room somewhere not near his place. Sathyanathan tries to prove his innocence, but fails to do so. The interrogator 'Nambiar' also shows some videos where his neighbour Varkeychan claims Sathyanathan totally hates the president, but Varkeychan meant the panchayat president. He gets sent to jail for a few days and is released, during which time he meets his jailmate Balan, who is accused of killing 50 people. Sathyanathan tries to butter Balan up but, in turn, ends up annoying Balan. Sathyanathan plans to shift to Mumbai since his reputation in his hometown is ruined. He goes to Mumbai, until he gets a call from a police officer asking him about his whereabouts. Sathyanathan truthfully says he is in Mumbai, but the police officer asks him why he is in the same place where the president is going. A few minutes later, police track him down and detain him in Mumbai central jail. There, he meets Saahi Bhai, a terrorist. Saahi Bhai underestimates Sathyanathan until a police officer asks Saahi Bhai to stay away from Sathyanathan as he has planned to kill the President of India. Since then, Saahi Bhai has regarded him as a great person. Sathyanathan gets released, and the terrorist who was released earlier picks up Sathyanathan. Sathyanathan stays with Saahi Bhai for 1–2 days, and Saahi Bhai hands Sathyanathan a phone; if Nambiar tries to interrogate him, he shall call the terrorist through that phone.

He reaches back to Kerala by train, and two police officers are waiting for him at the platform. They bring him to the station, where he gets interrogated by the DYSP. The DYSP asks where he was for the past 1–2 days, and Sathyanathan claims he was looking for some houses he could rent. The president plans to arrive in his hometown to see a well-known Vaidyar. Sathyanathan is again detained in jail. During his time in jail, Balan tells what happened for him to be in jail. Balan was living a happy life until he and his wife were on a bus. A child was asking for the doll Balan bought for his daughter. Balan, who is a kindhearted man, gives the child the doll, but the child throws it out of the window. Balan gets out of the bus to pick up the doll, but while picking up the doll, the bus explodes. Balan was accused of being the person who bombed the bus, and his daughter stays at her mother's parents' house. Sathyanathan promises Balan that Sathyanathan will bring justice to Balan and will prove to the court that Balan is innocent. Sathyanathan is released from jail. Sathyanathan is watching the news when he sees the visuals of the Aluva bus stop, where the bus that exploded has stopped. He spots the terrorist leader and goes to the police station.

He confesses to the police, and they go to Mumbai to catch one of the terrorist group members. They catch Tango, the member in charge of making bombs. He is then confined and interrogated; during that, Sathyanathan gets a phone call from Saahi Bhai. Nambiar instructs Sathyanathan to take the phone call and go to the place where Saahi Bhai is alone. Sathyanathan goes to an abandoned area. Saahi Bhai waits for Sathyanathan in a room. Sathyanathan, while having fear, pretends to be happy to see him and proceeds to hug him, but the terrorist starts to beat up Sathyanathan since Saahi is betrayed. Saahi Bhai cuffs Sathyanathan with him. Sathyanathan waits for Nambiar and the team to come; they arrive, but Saahi Bhai threatens them by showing his bomb vest and all the bombs planted around him. Nambiar manages to shoot Saahi Bhai, but Sathyanathan is devastated to see a person getting killed in front of him, as he has never witnessed such a sight.

The court identifies Balan as innocent as he reunites with his daughter. The president again arrives in his hometown. Sathyanathan gets detained. On television in the jail, he sees a speech by the President of India stating that he got emails from a person named "Sathyanathan" about how he tried to bring justice to Balan, and everyone praises Sathyanathan for his deed. So his reputation has been restored.

== Cast ==
- Dileep as Sathyanathan / Sathyan
  - Satya Suraj as Young Sathyan
- Joju George as Balan
- Veena Nandakumar as Susan, Sathyanathan's wife
- Jagapathi Babu as SP Nambiar IPS
- Anupam Kher as President of India (Malayalam translated dubbed by Sai Kumar)
- Siddique as Tabala Varkeychan (Thavala)
- Vijayaraghavan as Anto, Susan's father
- Johny Antony as Cleetus, Panchayat president
- Benny P. Nayarambalam as Thomas "Thomachan"
- Janardhanan as Vaidyar
- Jude Anthany Joseph as Sabu, Sathyanathan's friend (cameo appearance)
- Abhiram Radhakrishnan as DYSP Shihab Imran
- Makarand Deshpande as Saahi Bhai, terrorist leader
- Jaffer Sadiq as Tango, a terrorist group member
- Ramesh Pisharody as Stephen, a YouTube vlogger
- Alencier Ley Lopez as SP Vincent Koshy
- Boban Samuel as Saghavu Anirudhan
- Srikant Murali as Advocate Aravindakshan
- Neena Kurup as Kathreena, Susan's mother
- Sminu Sijo as Thresyakkutty, Varkeychan's wife
- Kottayam Ramesh as Constable Sugunan
- Thennal Abhilash as Balan's daughter
- Vineeth Thattil David as Balan's brother-in-law
- Rafi as Shahina 's father and Balan's father-in-law
- Vijilesh Karayad as Chandran
- Ambika Mohan as Vaidyar's patient
- Unni Marimayam as a prisoner
- KP Naisal as a prisoner
- Sinoj Varghese as a prisoner
- Thankachan Vithura as a bus conductor
- Anusree as Shahina, Balan's wife (cameo appearance)

== Production ==
=== Development ===
The film was announced in October 2021.

=== Filming ===
Filming began in October 2021, and the filming scenes in Kerala wrapped in December 2021. The second schedule began in August 2022 in Mumbai, Delhi, and Rajasthan. The entire filming wrapped in September 2022.

== Release ==
=== Theatrical ===
The film was initially planned to be released on 14 July 2023, but later It was postponed due to adverse weather conditions in Kerala. It was then theatrically released on 28 July 2023.

=== Home media ===
The digital rights were acquired by ManoramaMAX and streaming started on 21 September 2023.

=== Box office ===
The film grossing ₹217 million (US$2.3 million) worldwide, with Kerala grossing ₹155 million (US$1.7 million), ₹9.5 million (US$100,000) from the rest of India, and ₹52.5 million (US$560,000) from overseas earnings.

== Reception ==
=== Critical reception ===
The film received mixed reviews from critics.

Anandu Suresh of The Indian Express gave the film 1.5 stars out of 5 and wrote "Raffi's Voice of Sathyanathan, starring Dileep and Veena Nandakumar in the lead roles, suffers from a very average storyline that seems more fitting for the 90s or 2000s." Gopika ls of The Times of India gave the film 2.5 stars out of 5 and wrote "Raffi's Voice of Sathyanathan is a one-time watch. It had its moments but towards the end, it fell flat."

Nirmal Jovial of The Week gave the film 2 stars out of 5 and stated "Overall, the film did not create a favourable impression. But if you are someone who can be content with 'old wine in a new bottle', you might find enjoyment in this film." Princy Alexander of Onmanorama described the film as 'a perfect family entertainer' and wrote "Though the film gives limited screens pace to its female stars, it is definitely a winner." Vignesh Madhu of The New Indian Express gave the film 1.5 stars out of 5.
