= Bilathikuzhal =

- Directed by: Vinu Kolichal
- Screenplay by: Vinu Kolichal
- Produced by: Joseph Abraham
- Starring: Balan; Sanjay; Haridas
- Cinematography: Ram Raghav
- Edited by: Shaiju Nostalgia
- Music by: Pratik Abhayankar; Suraj Sankar [Mixing]
- Release date: 2018
- Running time: 132 minutes
- Country: India
- Language: Malayalam

Bilathikuzhal is a 2018 Indian Malayalam-language film directed by Vinu Kolichal.

Set in two periods, which showcases the protagonist's childhood and old age, the film tells his attachment with Bilathikuzhal. The film won the 2018 John Abraham Award for Best Malayalam Film.

== Official selection in various festivals ==
The film had its premiere at Jio MAMI Mumbai Film Festival 2018 and was later selected in NDFC Film Bazaar's Industry Screening 2018. It also had its selection in International Film Festival of Kerala(IFFK) 2018. It was also included in Artist's Cinema Section in KOCHI-MUZIRIS BIENNALE 2018.
