= Vasanthi (2021 film) =

Malayalam-language film

- Directed by: Shinos Rahman; Sajas Rahman
- Written by: Shinos Rahman; Sajas Rahman
- Produced by: Siju Wilson
- Starring: Swasika; Siju Wilson; Shabareesh Varma
- Cinematography: Abilash Sankar
- Edited by: Shinos Rahman; Sajas Rahman
- Music by: Rajesh Murugesan
- Production company: Wilson Pictures
- Release date: March 2021 (IFFK)
- Running time: 121 minutes
- Country: India
- Language: Malayalam

Vasanthi is a 2021 Indian Malayalam-language drama film written, edited and directed by Rahman brothers, Shinos & Sajas for producer, actor Siju Wilson. The film won the Kerala State Film Award for Best Film in 2020 at Kerala State Film Awards, before its release. The film was premiered at the 2021 International Film Festival of Kerala.

== Summary ==
It is a journey that traverses through stage plays, story telling and a host of male domains in Vasanthi's life.

The film begins on a seashore at dawn. Vasanthi, gazing into the horizon, walks onto an open stage. Beside her lies a man on a sofa. Facing the audience, she begins narrating her life, calling upon a listener named Balu from the crowd.

Vasanthi recalls her painful childhood. Born to a prostitute, she never knew a father. When she comes of age, her mother sends her away to relatives. On the bus, she meets Raman, the first man in her life, and begs to live with him. At first, their life together feels like a blessing, but Raman’s obsessive care soon turns into suffocating control and violence. When he drunkenly attempts to rape her, she fights back, ties him up, and escapes with another man—Chandu.

But Chandu is a thief. His companion, Suku, eyes Vasanthi with ill intent. When a car theft goes wrong, Chandu is arrested while Vasanthi and Suku escape. They begin living together, but poverty drives Suku into desperation. Unable to provide, he betrays Vasanthi, selling her to a wealthy man.

From then on, Vasanthi descends into prostitution. No longer the victim of circumstance, she becomes sought after by high-class clients—judges, doctors, musicians. But one night, a judge dies after drinking at her house. His wife pleads to keep his death a secret to avoid public shame, and Vasanthi complies.

Back on stage, Balu demands more of her story. She asks him to leave briefly, but when he returns with his father-in-law, tensions rise. Balu confesses he struck his wife so he could attend. Enraged, his father-in-law kills him in front of Vasanthi.

With quiet finality, Vasanthi declares the drama of her life has ended. She walks away, stepping into a travelling drama company’s vehicle, blurring the line between theatre and reality as the film closes.

== Cast ==
- Swasika as Vasanthi
- Siju Wilson as Suku
- Shabareesh Varma as Chandhu

== Awards ==
50th Kerala State Film Awards 2020

- Kerala State Film Award for Best Film
- Kerala State Film Award for Best Screenplay
- Kerala State Film Award for Best Character Actress - Swasika
