= Pharma (TV series) =

Indian television series

- Genre: Drama
- Written by: P. R. Arun
- Directed by: P. R. Arun
- Starring: Nivin Pauly; Rajit Kapoor; Narain; Shruti Ramachandran; Veena Nandakumar
- Music by: Abjaksh. S (Original Background Score& Music Composer); Jakes Bejoy (credited for "Music Supervisor")
- Country of origin: India
- Original language: Malayalam
- No. of seasons: 1
- No. of episodes: 8

Production
- Producer: Krishnan Sethukumar
- Cinematography: Abhinandan Ramanujam
- Editor: Sreejith Sarang
- Production company: Movie Mill

Original release
- Network: JioHotstar
- Release: 27 November 2024 (IFFI); 19 December 2025 (JioHotstar)

Pharma is an Indian Malayalam-language drama streaming television series directed by P. R. Arun. It stars Nivin Pauly and Rajit Kapur in lead roles. The series is produced by Krishnan Sethukumar under the banner of Movie Mill. The series is based on true incidents.

The series premiered at the 55th International Film Festival of India on 27 November 2024. The series released on 19 December 2025 in JioHotstar.

== Synopsis ==
The story centers on K.P. Vinod, a young, middle-class medical representative who enters the highly competitive pharmaceutical industry to secure a stable future. At first, he works hard to meet sales targets and climb the corporate ladder by promoting a new drug — but things take a dark turn when he discovers the medication’s dangerous side effects on patients.

As Vinod learns more, he becomes increasingly conflicted between corporate ambitions and his moral conscience. Realizing that the drug he’s been selling is harming people, he decides to take a stand against unethical practices in the pharmaceutical industry — fighting against powerful companies, systemic corruption, and the very structure that rewarded his earlier success.

The series explores ethical dilemmas, corporate greed, the impact of harmful drugs on society, and one man’s struggle to do what’s right despite overwhelming odds.

== Cast ==
- Nivin Pauly as K.P. Vinod, former medical representative at "RX Life Healthcare" and later CEO of "Zaathi"
- Rajit Kapur as Dr. Rajeev Rao, one of the founders of "Zaathi"
- Narain as Dr. Vijay, Dr. Janaki's husband
- Shruti Ramachandran as Dr Janaki, Dr. Vijay's wife
- Veena Nandakumar as Nanda, Vinod's ex-girlfriend
- Muthumani as Jasmine, Vinod's senior at RX Life Healthcare
- Binu Pappu as Alex, Vinod's former mentor at RX Life Healthcare
- Nikhil Ramachandran
- Saafboi (Safwan) as Mashood, medical representative at "RX Life Healthcare" and junior to Vinod
- Sruthy Jayan as Nirmala, Vinod's wife
- Aalekh Kapoor as Aravind Subramaniam, CEO of RX Life Healthcare
- Aswathy Manoharan as Savithri, a nurse
- Siddharth as Kaachi
- Sandhya Manoj as Judge
- Rajendran NV as Dr Joseph Palathara

== Production ==
The production of the series started from 18 October 2023. It wrapped up on 8 April 2024.

== Reception ==
Pharma received mixed to positive reviews from critics. The Week noted the series as "Nivin Pauly returns to form in his first web series". India Today termed the series a "delightful thriller". OTTPlay wrote that the series makes viewers "Nivin Pauly-PR Arun’s series will make you ponder before you pop a pill next time". The Times of India stated that "Nivin Pauly’s medical drama thrills with its novelty and gripping story" The Hollywood Reporter wrote that "Earnest Nivin Pauly in a Medico-Thriller that requires patience".
