= Mundrothuruth (film) =

2016 Malayalam feature film

- Directed by: Manu
- Written by: Manu
- Cinematography: Pratap P Nair
- Edited by: Manoj Kannoth
- Music by: Dawn Vincent
- Release date: 16 November 2016
- Country: India
- Language: Malayalam

Mundrothuruth is a 2016 Malayalam film written and directed by Manu. The film was released on 11 November 2016 in India in two theaters

== Cast ==
- Indrans
- Alencier Ley Lopez
- Abhija Sivakala
- Anil Nedumangad
- Jason Chacko

== Awards ==
- 2016: Aravindan Puraskaram for the best debut filmmaker
- 2015: John Abraham Award for Best Malayalam Film
