= Inspection Bungalow =

- Official release poster
- Genre: Horror comedy
- Written by: Suneesh Varanadu
- Directed by: Saiju S. S.
- Starring: Shabareesh Varma; Aadhya Prasad; Senthil Krishna Rajamani; Shaju Sreedhar; Jayan Cherthala; Veena Nair; Sreejith Ravi; Balaji Sarma; Manohari Joy
- Music by: Denson Dominic
- Country of origin: India
- Original language: Malayalam
- No. of seasons: 1
- No. of episodes: 7

Production
- Producer: Veena Nair
- Cinematography: Sudheer Surendran
- Camera setup: Multi-camera
- Running time: 16 — 27 minutes
- Production company: Veena Nair Productions

Original release
- Network: ZEE5
- Release: 14 November 2025

Inspection Bungalow is a 2025 Indian Malayalam-language horror-comedy web series directed by Saiju S. S. and written by Suneesh Varanadu.

The series is produced by Veena Nair under the banner of Veena Nair Productions. It features an ensemble cast led by Shaju Sreedhar, Jayan Cherthala, Veena Nair, Balaji Sarma, Senthil Krishna Rajamani, and Sreejith Ravi in pivotal roles.

== Premise ==
The series is set in the fictional village of Aravangad, where Sub-Inspector Vishnu, an ambivalent and "cowardly" police officer with a mysterious past, is transferred to a local police station. The police station is forced to move its operations to an abandoned, dilapidated government property known as the "Inspection Bungalow," which is widely believed to be haunted.

What starts as a mundane relocation quickly devolves into a series of bizarre crimes, ghostly occurrences, and supernatural events. Vishnu, along with the assistance of Mythili, a paranormal researcher played by Aadhya Prasad, attempts to uncover the secrets and mysteries buried within the bungalow's walls. The narrative blends elements of suspense and horror with situational comedy and fantasy.

== Cast and characters ==
- Shabareesh Varma as Sub-Inspector Vishnu
- Aadhya Prasad as Mythili, a paranormal researcher
- Senthil Krishna as Balamurali
- Shaju Sreedhar as Parameswaran
- Jayan Cherthala as MLA Shaji Manjakadamban
- Veena Nair
- Sreejith Ravi
- Balaji Sarma
- Manohari Joy

== Production and release ==
The series was written by Suneesh Varanaad and directed by Saiju S. S. The trailer was officially released by Malayalam actor Dileep on 4 November 2025. It premiered on the streaming platform ZEE5 on 14 November 2025.

== Reception ==
Inspection Bungalow received mixed to negative reviews from critics. India Today noted that the series as “Flashes of fun in an uneven horror-comedy". Cinema Express was more critical, stating that the series “misses the horror-comedy memo.” Filmfare wrote "A quirky horror comedy that fumbles its final stretch". Pinkvilla commented that "Shabareesh Varma’s horror comedy had the ideas, but not the delivery". OTTplay wrote: "Shabareesh Varma’s series is fearfully dated, turns ‘horror’ into comedy"
