= Thodraa =

- Poster
- Directed by: Madhuraj
- Produced by: S Jai Chandra
- Starring: Prithvi Rajan; Veena Nandakumar
- Cinematography: Senthil Kumar
- Edited by: Rajesh Kannan
- Music by: RN Uthamaraja; Navin Shander (score)
- Production company: JS Aboorva Production
- Release date: 7 September 2018
- Country: India
- Language: Tamil

Thodraa (transl. Touch me!) is a 2018 Tamil-language drama film directed by debutante Madhuraj and stars Prithvi Rajan and Veena Nandakumar.

== Cast ==
- Prithvi Rajan as Shankar
- Veena Nandakumar as Divya
- MS Kumar as Pounraj
- Suzane George as Pounraj's wife
- Venkatesh
- Gajaraj
- Theepetti Ganesan as Shankar's friend
- Cool Suresh
- Prabanjan
- Baby Apoorva

== Production ==
The film is directed by Madhuraj, a former assistant of Bhagyaraj. The film highlights caste-based issues. Bhagyaraj suggested to Madhuraj to cast Prithvi Rajan in the lead role. Malayalam actress Veena Nandakumar stars opposite Rajan in the film. The film is based on a true incident that occurred in Dharmapuri.

== Soundtrack ==
The music was composed by R.N. Uthamaraja and Navin Shander. Silambarasan sang a song in the film.

No.	Title	Lyrics	Singer(s)	Length
1.	"Bakku Bakku"	Madhuraj	Silambarasan	3:48
2.	"Oru Kadhal Kalavaani"	SBI Mohan	Chinmayi	3:54
3.	"Iru Paravai"	Kaniyur Varatharaj	Senthildass Velayutham	3:11
4.	"Adi Unakkulla Olichu Vachen"	Seerkazhi Sirpi	Anthakudi Ilayaraja, Priyanka	4:05
Total length:				14:58

== Release ==
The film released along with five other films. The Times of India gave the film a rating of two out of five stars and wrote that "A better screenplay and an engaging narration would have made it at least a one time watch". The Deccan Chronicle gave the film the same rating and wrote that "A taut narration and a little bit of coherence would have made it a better product". Cinema Express wrote that "Advertised as a tribute to victims of honour killings, the beyond shoddy filmmaking ends up making this an insult to their memories instead".
