= Panchavalsara Padhathi =

- Directed by: Premlal
- Written by: Sajeev Pazhoor
- Produced by: K G Anilkumar
- Starring: Siju Wilson; Sudheesh; Nisha Sarang; Arya Salim; Harish Pengan; Sibi Thomas; Jolly Chirayath
- Cinematography: Alby
- Edited by: Kiran Das
- Music by: Shaan Rahman
- Production company: Kichappus Entertainments
- Release date: 2024
- Country: India
- Language: Malayalam

Panchavalsara Padhathi is a 2024 Indian Malayalam-language film directed by Premlal, written by Sajeev Pazhoor and produced by K G Anilkumar. The film stars Siju Wilson, Sudheesh, Nisha Sarang, Harish Pengan, Sibi Thomas, Jolly Chirayath, Krishnendu A Menon etc. in lead roles. It is the last movie Harish Pengan acted in before his death.

== Plot ==
Sanoj (Siju Wilson) runs an Akshaya Centre in Kalamberi village. All of a sudden, Kalambasura - a local legend- starts appearing in front of the villagers. The movie revolves around the incidents that happen there after

== Cast ==
- Siju Wilson as Sanoj
- Sudheesh as Porankulam Ramachandran
- Nisha Sarang as Haritha
- KT Kunjikannan as Balan
- Vijaya Kumar as MP Xavier Franciss
- Arya Salim as Deepa Pradeep IAS
- Muthumani as Urmila Bhatt
- Harish Pengan
- Chembil Ashokan CI Raj kumar
- Sibi Thomas
- Gibin Gopinath as Swamiji
- Binoy Nambala as Unnikrishnan
- Jolly Chirayath
- Krishnendu A Menon
- Sandhya Manoj as Rakshasi
- Shinu John Chacko
- Surjith Gopinath as Gokulan

== Release ==
The film was released in theatres on 26 April 2024.
