= Kozhipporu =

2020 Malayalam film

- Movie Poster
- Directed by: Jinoy Janardhanan; Jibit George
- Screenplay by: Jinoy Janardhanan
- Produced by: V. G. Jayakumar
- Starring: Indrans; Pauly Valsan; Anjali Nair; Veena Nandakumar; Jinoy Janardhanan; Navajith Narayanan; Sarin Rishi; Sohan Seenulal; Praveen T.J
- Cinematography: Ragesh Narayanan
- Edited by: Appu N. Bhattathiri
- Music by: Bijibal
- Distributed by: J Pic Movies
- Release date: 6 March 2020
- Running time: 99 minutes
- Country: India
- Language: Malayalam

Kozhipporu (transl. Cockfight) is an Indian Malayalam-language Family Drama film, produced by V G Jayakumar under the banner J Pic Movies. The movie is written and directed by Jinoy Janardhanan and Jibit George, and starred Indrans, Pauly Valsan, Anjali Nair, Jolly Chirayath, Veena Nandakumar, Jinoy Janardhanan, Navajith Narayanan, Sarin Rishi, Sohan Seenulal and Praveen TJ. The soundtrack was composed by Bijibal. The film is edited by Appu N. Bhattathiri and has Ragesh Narayanan as the cinematographer. The film released in theatres on 6 March 2020.

== Plot ==
Friendly neighbours buy chickens together, but a misunderstanding sours their relationship. The feud deepens when it's discovered their children are having an affair.

== Cast ==
- Indrans as George
- Pauly Valsan as Mary
- Jolly Chirayath as Beena
- Sohan Seenulal as Varghese
- Anjali Nair as Jibina
- Veena Nandakumar as Aani
- Sarin Rishi as Keerappalli Antony
- Sankar Induchoodan as Tom
- Jinoy Janardhanan as Alby
- Navajith Narayanan as Jibit
- Praveen TJ as Gokul
- Jibit George as Kevin
- Nandini Sree as Chinjulu
- Geethi Sangeetha as Jaya
- Shiny Sarah as Chinjulu Mother
- Mary Eramallur as Sujatha
- Reshmi Anil as Sindhu
- Baby Sameeksha Nair as Agasteena/Agu
- V G Jayakumar as Broker
- Bride Visitors as Subair Peringodan, Stella Simon

== Soundtrack ==
The music and background score of the film is done by Bijibal and the lyrics was written by Vinayak Sasikumar.

- Aadhyathe Nokkil... - Bijibal, Aani aami vazhappally
- Vayadikkattu... - Uday Ramachandran
- Nalukaalippayalla... - Vaikom Vijayalakshmi

== Release ==
The film released on 6 March 2020.
