= Abraham Ozler =

2024 Indian Malayalam crime thriller film

- Theatrical release poster
- Directed by: Midhun Manuel Thomas
- Written by: Dr.Randheer Krishnan
- Produced by: Irshad M. Hassan; Midhun Manuel Thomas
- Starring: Jayaram; Mammootty; Anoop Menon; Anaswara Rajan; Arjun Ashokan
- Cinematography: Theni Eswar
- Edited by: Shameer Muhammed
- Music by: Midhun Mukundan
- Production companies: Nerambokku; Manual Movie Makers
- Distributed by: Ann Mega Media
- Release date: 11 January 2024
- Running time: 144 minutes
- Country: India
- Language: Malayalam
- Box office: ₹40.05 crore

Abraham Ozler is a 2024 Indian Malayalam-language crime thriller film co-produced and directed by Midhun Manuel Thomas and written by Randheer Krishnan. The film stars Jayaram in the titular role alongside Anaswara Rajan, Anoop Menon, Arjun Ashokan, Saiju Kurup, Arya Salim, Senthil Krishna, Jagadish, Saikumar and Dileesh Pothan in supporting roles. The film also features Mammootty as the main antagonist. The film revolves around ACP Abraham Ozler's efforts to investigate the death of an IT employee and capture a serial killer, also known as "Birthday Killer".

The project was announced on 19 May 2023. Principal photography began on 20 May 2023. The film was shot across locations including Thrissur, Palakkad, Coimbatore, Idukki and Wayanad. The filming wrapped up on 14 November 2023. The music was composed by Midhun Mukundan while the cinematography and editing were handled by Theni Eswar and Shameer Muhammed, respectively.

Abraham Ozler was initially set to be released on 25 December 2023, but the release date was postponed to 11 January 2024. The film received mixed reviews from critics, with praise for its acting, cinematography, direction, and musical score, but criticism for its script. The film earned ₹40.05 crore worldwide, becoming the highest-grossing film of Jayaram's career in leading role.

== Plot ==
Past: ACP Abraham Ozler is on holiday with his wife Anisha and daughter Jenny when he receives a call about a double murder and leaves immediately. Halfway there, he realises the call was faked and rushes back home, only to find Anisha and Jenny missing. Vineeth, a drug addict, later confesses that he kidnapped them, killed them and buried their remains in a forest, as revenge for Ozler arresting him in a narcotics case. However, he says he was heavily drugged that night and cannot remember where the bodies were buried.

Present: Three years later, Ozler is a chronically depressed insomniac who suffers hallucinations from lack of sleep. He has never found closure and remains devastated, visiting Vineeth in prison and questioning him regularly in the hope of recovering his wife's and daughter's remains. Meanwhile, he is investigating a series of murders with his subordinates SI Divya and Sijo. At each scene, the killer leaves birthday cards containing fragments of the Latin quote, "Let conversation cease. Let laughter flee. This is where death rejoices to help the living". The media dubs the culprit "The Birthday Killer". The investigation leads the team to Krishnadas, a man who uses an artificial larynx and was once a gifted singer before losing his voice in a surgical mishap.

As Ozler digs into the past, he uncovers a link between the victims’ parents: Shivakumar and Selvaraj, who were postgraduate medical students at Kozhikode Medical College in 1989. They, along with Sevi Punnoose and Alexander Joseph, were batchmates and friends who were later involved in a mysterious accident before parting ways. Krishnadas breaks into Alexander's house and tries to abduct him, but Ozler stops him and arrests him. Even so, Sevi is soon kidnapped. Ozler then discovers that the Alexander supposedly living in Dubai was an imposter, and that the real Alexander had remained in India and taken Sevi. Alexander attempts to kill Sevi in the same way as the earlier victims, but Ozler arrests him at the last moment. In custody, Alexander finally reveals the truth.

1989: Alexander was a talented surgery student at Kozhikode Medical College. Sevi, who was also studying surgery, resented him because the professors preferred Alexander's skill. Shivakumar, a General Medicine student, hated him for courting Suja Jayadev, a first-year MBBS student whom Shivakumar had been pursuing. Selvaraj, an Anesthesia student and drug addict, was expelled after Alexander caught him taking drugs and reported him.

Krishnadas was admitted to the college with a throat tumour that affected his voice. Alexander was assigned to assist in the operation and chose Sevi to help him. During the surgery, Alexander was unexpectedly forced to take charge and asked Sevi to cut the tissue inside Krishnadas's neck. Driven by jealousy and bitterness, Sevi instead damaged Krishnadas's Vocal cords, leaving him unable to speak. Alexander reported the act to the faculty, and Sevi was blacklisted. Both men were suspended because Alexander had been the first assistant. Enraged and under the influence of drink and drugs, Selvaraj, Sevi and Shivakumar attacked Alexander and put him in a coma. They then falsified the incident, faked injuries of their own and claimed that a drunken Alexander had driven them into an accident. Suja became despondent, and after overhearing doctors suggest withdrawing life support, she killed herself by jumping in front of a bus. Ironically, Alexander regained consciousness on the same day. After years of treatment, he recovered movement but lost most of his postgraduate memories through dissociative amnesia, including those of Suja, Sevi, Shivakumar and Selvaraj. Three years earlier, seeing Krishnadas on a television programme triggered his memory, and Alexander eventually learned of Suja's death and joined forces with Krishnadas to exact revenge.

Present: Sevi shows no remorse when confronted in Ozler's custody. Ozler tells him bluntly that he deserved to die, and Sevi suddenly dies of cardiac arrest at the launch of his autobiography. Moments earlier, Ozler receives a call from forensic surgeon Satheesh Madhavan, who reveals that Alexander poisoned Sevi and the other victims with methylene blue and agar-agar, a lethal, bacteria-infected surgical ink used before cutting them. The truth behind the earlier accident is also exposed: Shivakumar is found dead in his car, while Selvaraj turns to drink and is abandoned by his wife after realising his role in their son's death.

During one of Ozler's routine prison visits to Vineeth, he encounters Alexander and Krishnadas again. Alexander cryptically says "Bone Residue", hinting at an unresolved truth about Ozler's family. Ozler realises that if a blade is used to hack flesh, bone residue remains on it even after chemical washing. He confronts Vineeth, who remains unrepentant and challenges him to dig deeper for the truth.

== Cast ==
- Jayaram as ACP Abraham Ozler IPS
- Mammootty as Dr. Alexander Puthankudiyil Joseph / Birthday Killer
  - Adam Sabiq as Young Alexander
- Anaswara Rajan as Suja Jayadev, Alexander's girlfriend
- Saiju Kurup as Krishnadas P. S., Alexander's Associate
  - Joseph Mathews as Young Krishnadas
- Arjun Ashokan as Vineeth
- Anoop Menon as Dr. Satheesh Madhavan, police surgeon and Ozler's friend
- Arya Salim as SI Divya Sreedharan
- Senthil Krishna as SI Sijo T. Venu
- Jagadish as Dr. Sevi Punnoose, retired police surgeon
  - Shivaraj as Young Sevi
- Dileesh Pothan as Sudhakaran Payyarath / Dr. Alexander Joseph (Fake)
- Ravi Venkatraman as Selvaraj
  - Shajeer P. Basheer as Young Selvaraj
- Kumarakom Raghunath as Dr. Shivakumar
  - Shiva Hariharan as Young Shivakumar
- Saikumar as Counsellor, Ozler's friend (Cameo)
- Arjun Nandhakumar as Dr. Arun Jayadev, Suja's younger brother
- Assim Jamal as DIG Prasad Rajan IPS
- Harikrishnan as Naveen Shivakumar
- Aneesh Gopal as SI Sarath
- Prasanth Alexander as Dr. Salam
- Parvathi T. as Dr. Annapoorneswari
- Boban Alummoodan as Dr. Sreedharan Nambiar
- Anju Kurian as Aneesha, Ozler's wife
- Saniya as Jennifer / Jenni, Ozler's daughter
- Darshana Sudarshan Nair as Maya
- Priya Sreejith as Sister Teena
- Sheethal Zackaria as Sister Jyothi
- Sivarenjini as Sister Seenath
- Sreeram Ramachandran as Speech Therapist
- Krishna Prasad as MRI Technician
- Rajan Poothrakkal as Raghavan
- Mani Shornur as Dr. Zakariah
- Habeeb Thrissur as Dr. Govindaraj
- Jolly Chirayath as CEO Sasikala
- Nandhan Unni as Ambulance Driver Mani
- Lali Marakkar as Krishnadas's mother
- Devendranath as Dr. Eshwaran Potty
- Rakesh Pattu as Ashok Selvaraj
- Rini Udayakumar as Raghavan's wife
- Mani as Lorry Driver Sivankutty
- Shaize as Duty M O
- Uma K P as Dr. Aysha Sathyaraj
- Thulasi as Swapna, Suja's friend
- Maya Menon as Alexander's mother
- Sonia Giri as Xavi's wife
- Kala as Shivakumar's wife
- Maya as Selvaraj's wife
- Nidhin Sasidharan as Ajeesh
- Kumariyamma as Ajeesh's mother
- Benyamin as Himself (Cameo)
- Midhun Manuel Thomas as Leader (Cameo)

== Production ==
=== Development ===
After the success of Anjaam Pathira (2020), Midhun Manuel Thomas wanted to direct a film featuring Kunchako Boban. However, the commencement of shooting didn't occur due to various reasons. It was during that time that director John Manthrikkal narrated a story to Midhun which was written by ortho surgeon Dr. Randheer Krishnan. He liked the story and decided to direct the film.

In an interview with Anandu Suresh of The Indian Express, Midhun revealed that the film's titular protagonist was named after the Canadian physician William Osler, regarded as the 'Father of Modern Medicine'. He also revealed that he had initially included a backstory, explaining that Abraham Ozler's father, a doctor, named his son after his favorite physician with the hope that Abraham would also become a physician like his father. The film marked Midhun's return to direction after a four-year hiatus. Meanwhile, he had penned the screenplay for Garudan (2023) and Phoenix (2023).

=== Casting ===
Midhun approached Jayaram to play the titular role. Initially, Jayaram was hesitant to commit to the project as he believed that it was unlike any film he had done till now. He believed it was a heavy character and had to appear in two timelines with different looks. However, he agreed to play the role as Midhun convinced him. In preparing for the role, Jayaram put in some weight and grew a long beard with a tired look to fit the character. Abraham Ozler marks Jayaram's second Malayalam venture since 2019.

There were reports that Mammootty would have a 15-minute cameo appearance in the film which was denied. Reports suggested that Mammootty would have a screen-time of over 45 minutes in the film, and it was also reported that he would be playing a negative role, which was unconfirmed. Regarding Mammootty's cameo, Jayaram revealed that Mammootty was not the first choice to play the role of Alexander. The makers approached actors Sathyaraj, R. Sarathkumar, Prakash Raj, and others. Midhun said that, when he narrated the story of Abraham Ozler to Mammootty, he liked the script and asked him if he could play the antagonist. Midhun was apprehensive about casting Mammootty. However, Jayaram convinced him to give the role to Mammootty. Midhun met Mammootty again, who consented to play the role of Alexander.

=== Filming ===
The project was announced on 19 May 2023. Principal photography began on 20 May 2023 in Mission Quarters in Thrissur. Producer Irshad M. Hassan performed the switch-on ceremony. The first scene was reportedly shot between Jayaram and Sai Kumar. Apart from Thrissur, Palakkad, Coimbatore, Idukki and Wayanad were the other shooting locations. The filming wrapped up on 14 November 2023.

== Music ==
The film's music was composed by Midhun Mukundan. It consists of one track, Poomaname, from the 1985 film Nirakkoottu. The track was originally composed by Shyam and the lyrics were written by Poovachal Khader. The song was sung by Nitin K. Siva, while the original song was by K. S. Chithra, G. Venugopal and K. G. Markose.

== Release ==
=== Theatrical ===
The film was initially scheduled to release on Christmas Day in 2025. The release date was postponed to 11 January 2024 to avoid a clash with other major Christmas releases. The film was released in North America on 12 January 2024.

=== Home media ===
Abraham Ozler was released in Disney+ Hotstar on 20 March 2024 and is available in Hindi, Tamil, Telugu and Kannada languages.

== Reception ==
=== Critical response ===
Abraham Ozler received mixed reviews from critics. On the review aggregator website Rotten Tomatoes, 50% of 6 critics' reviews are positive, with an average rating of 6.6/10.

Gopika IS of The Times of India gave 3/5 stars and wrote "Jayaram starrer Abraham Ozler turned out to be an interesting watch and can undoubtedly be seen as a new phase in the actor's career." Sara Anna Eepan of The Week gave 3/5 stars and wrote "Abraham Ozler is worth a watch on the big screen for those interested in an investigation drama with medical thriller elements."

Sajin Shrijith of The New Indian Express gave 3/5 stars and wrote "Abraham Ozler doesn't lack the ability to hook us, but it made me wonder whether it would've worked better as an airport novel than a film." Nikhil Sebastian of Pinkvilla gave 2.5/5 stars and wrote "Abraham Ozler falls into the category of another half-baked thriller, relying on the performances of the actors and a brilliant original score." Anandu Suresh of The Indian Express gave 2.5/5 stars and wrote "Midhun Manuel Thomas' film can be dubbed as a crime thriller that meets the essential criteria for the genre. However, determining whether it has done a good job requires more than a simple yes/no answer."

S. R. Praveen of The Hindu wrote "The Jayaram-starrer is marred by generic treatment to the serial killer genre, with a cameo from superstar Mammootty offering only a temporary relief." Vishal Menon of FIlm Companion wrote "By reinventing Jayaram as an actor and by infusing so much information into a stereotypical thriller, Abraham Ozler remains fairly engaging even if you've seen it all before." Princy Alexander of Onmanorama wrote "The initial feeling of repetitiveness affects the thrills in the first half. However, true to the expression "to end with a bang," Midhun employs the right tactics in the second half to provide viewers with a more than satisfactory conclusion."

=== Box office ===
Abraham Ozler grossed ₹28.8 million from Kerala and ₹60 million worldwide, on its opening day. The film grossed ₹2.34 crore on its second day, with worldwide gross exceeding ₹10 crore. Abraham Ozler grossed ₹2.9 crore on its third day and ₹3.19 crore on its first Sunday. The film grossed around ₹11.31 crore in its first four days from Kerala. The film grossed ₹22 crore worldwide in its first weekend.

The film grossed a total of $61,616 from the North America in the first weekend. The film grossed ₹1.4 crore on its fifth day from the Kerala. The film grossed a total of ₹150 million in its first 8 days from Kerala. The film grossed a total of ₹31 million in its second weekend at Kerala. The film grossed a total of $1.36 million (approx ₹ 113 million) from 11 days at the UAE and GCC box office, while it grossed ₹17 million from ROI circuits in 11 days. In North America, the film grossed $130K in UK and Europe it grossed $150K and in Australia $17K in 11 days at the box office. In 16 days, the film grossed more than ₹20 crore from Kerala and became the first commercially successful Malayalam film of 2024. The film made a total collection of ₹40.05 crore from the worldwide box office in first 30 days of its release and also emerged as the all-time highest grossing solo film in the career of its leading man Jayaram within its lifetime run at the theatres.
