= Arya Salim =

Indian actress

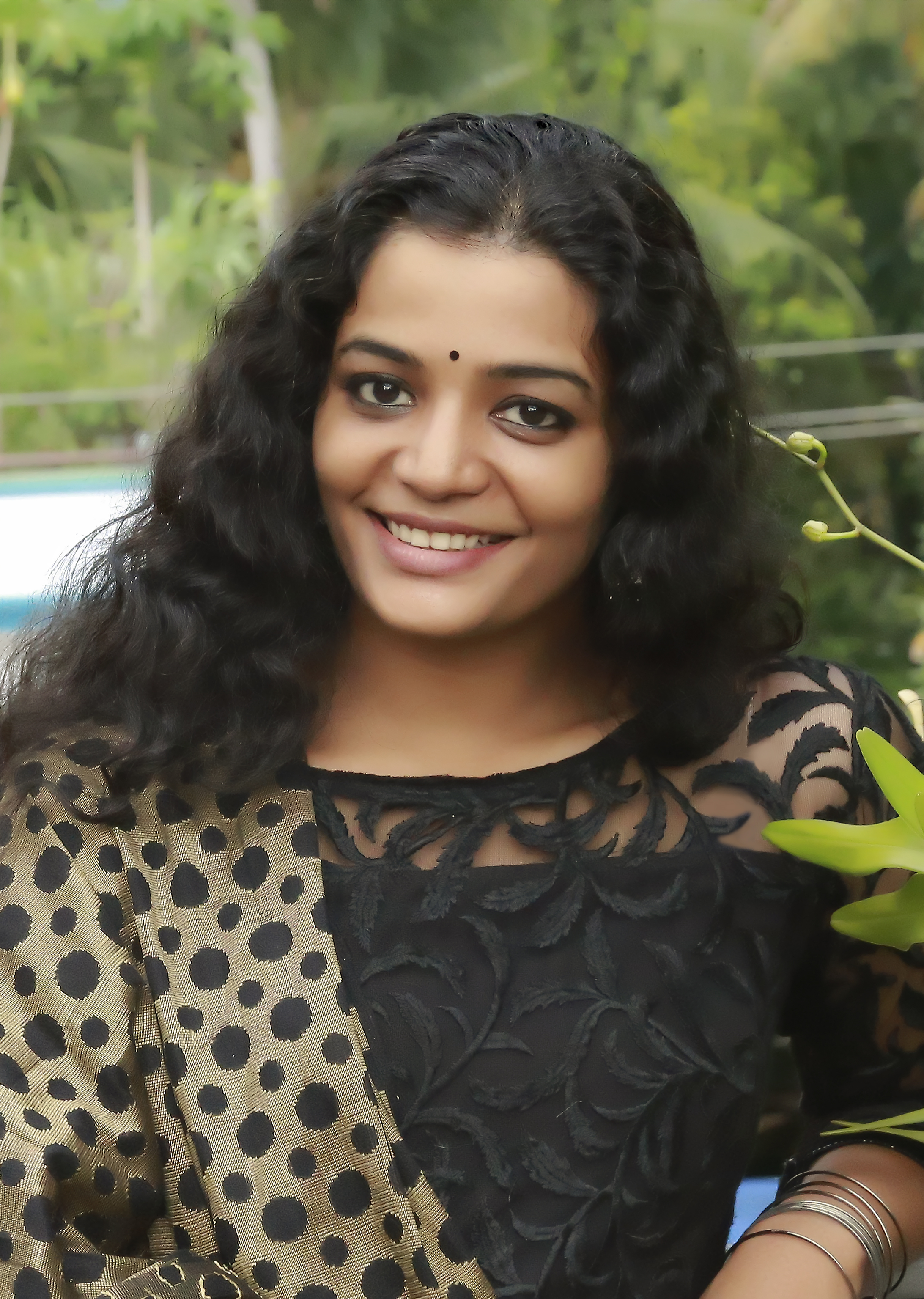
- Arya Salim in 2019
- Occupation: Actress
- Years active: 2017–present

Arya Salim is an Indian actress who works in Malayalam films. She made her acting debut in 2017 with the Malayalam film Thrissivaperoor Kliptham directed by Ratheish Kumar. She has since appeared in Ee.Ma.Yau., Thamaasha, Aarkkariyam, Minnal Murali, Bheemante Vazhi, Iratta, RDX: Robert Dony Xavier and Abraham Ozler.

== Acting career ==
Arya Salim made her acting debut in the 2017 with the Malayalam film Thrissivaperoor Kliptham. In 2019, Arya appeared in Qamar Hady, an Egyptian TV series.

== Filmography ==
Key
†	Denotes film or TV productions that have not yet been released

List of Arya Salim film credits
Year	Title	Role	Ref.
2017	Thrissivaperoor Kliptham	Police Constable Saramma	
2018	Swathanthryam Ardharathriyil	Ancy	
2018	Ee.Ma.Yau.	Elisabeth	
2018	French Viplavam		
2019	Thamaasha	Ameera	
2021	Aarkkariyam	Sheeja	
2021	Minnal Murali	Jesmi	
2021	Bheemante Vazhi	Advocate Deepa	
2022	Kochaal		
2022	19(1)(a)	Jenny Philip	
2022	1744 White Alto		
2023	Iratta	SP Savitha Sathyan	
2023	RDX: Robert Dony Xavier	Jancy	
2023	Panchavalsara Padhathi	Deepa Pradeep IAS	
2024	Abraham Ozler	SI Divya Sreedharan	
2025	Narivetta	C. K Shanthi (character based on C.K Jaanu)	
