= Jolly Chirayath =

Indian actress

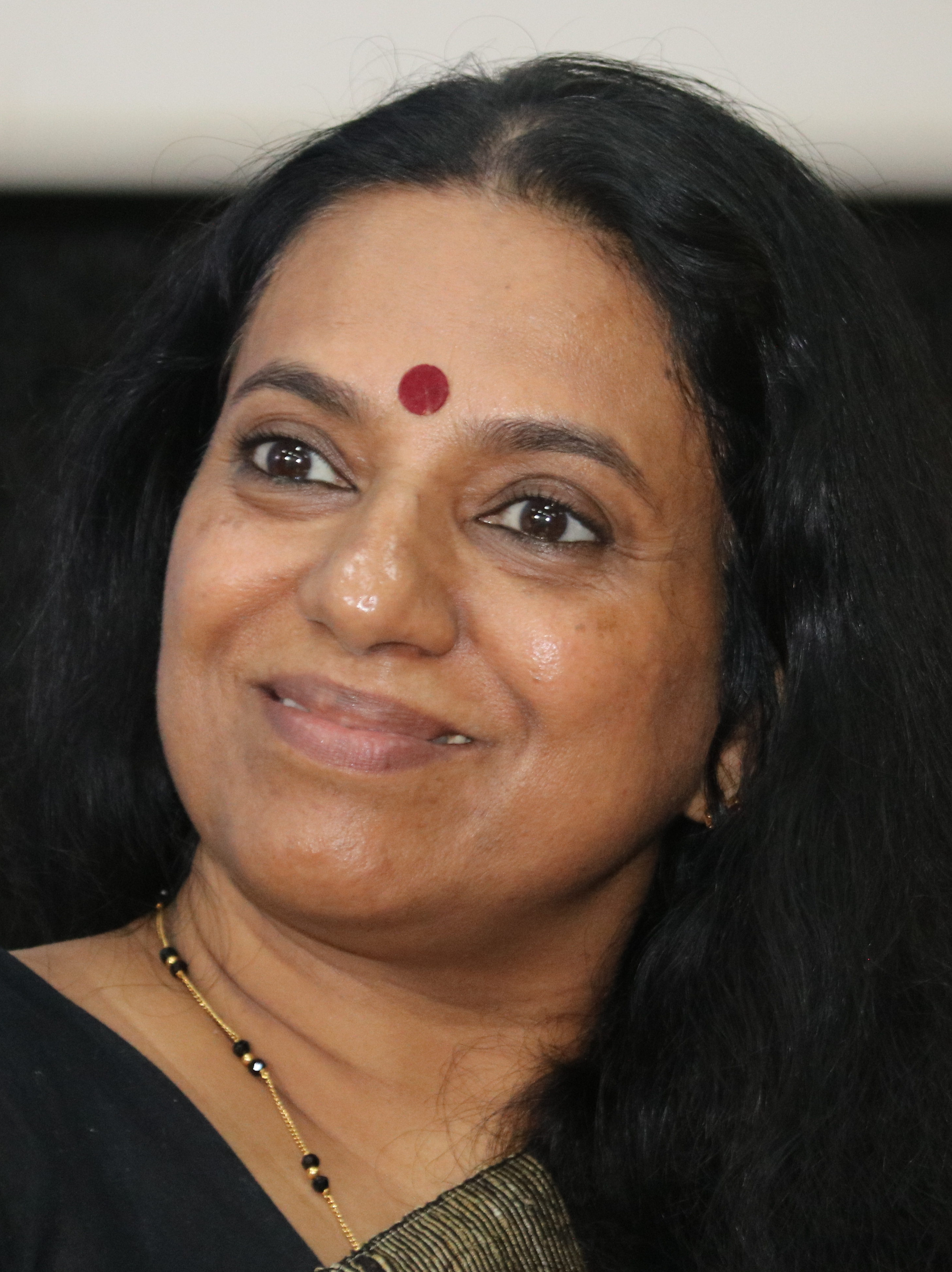
- Jolly chirayath
- Born: Chirayath Lona Jolly; Nashik, Maharashtra, India
- Occupation: Actress
- Years active: 2017–present
- Children: 2

Jolly Chirayath is an Indian actress who acts in Malayalam films. She made her acting debut in the film Angamaly Diaries directed by Lijo Jose Pellissery.

== Early and personal life ==
Chirayath was born in Nashik, Maharashtra to Lona Chirayath, a business man and Lilly Lona, both originally from Thrissur, Kerala. She lived in Sharjah, UAE from 1996 to 2010 and worked with Almarai as a sales professional and Al Faisal Photography Studio in Sharjah. Her autobiographical book, titled Burning Seas, was released at the 2023 Sharjah International Book Fair.

== Filmography ==
Year	Title	Role	Ref
2017	Angamaly Diaries	Vincent Pepe's mother	
2017	Kaattu	Ayesha	
2017	Aadu 2	Stella's mother	
2018	Eeda	Upendran's mother	
2018	Koode	Doctor	
2019	June	Alex's mother	
2019	Vikruthi	Mercy Chacko	
2019	Virus	Pradeep's mother	
2020	Kappela	Saramma	
2020	Paapam Cheyyathavar Kalleriyatte	Linda's mother	
2020	Kozhipporu	Beena	
2021	Malik	Inspector General of Prisons	
2022	Nizhal	Vathsala	
2022	Kaduva	Victor's mother	
2022	Vichithram	Jasmine	
2023	Sulaikha Manzil	Haleema	
2023	Pappachan Olivilanu	Eliamma	
2023	Pulimada	Sherly	
2023	Dance Party		
2023	Family		
2024	Abraham Ozler	CEO Sasikala	
2024	Panchavalsara Padhathi		
2024	Kanakarajyam	Shobha	
2025	Written & Directed by God	Lisy's mother	

== Awards ==
- 2021- Kerala State Chalachitra Academy, Kerala State Television Awards, Second Best Actress - for Kombal
