= Pushpaka Vimanam (2024 film) =

Indian crime thriller film

- Theatrical release poster
- Directed by: Ullas Krishna
- Written by: Deepu S Nairum; Sandeep Sadanandan
- Produced by: Sam Varghese Cherian; Bibin Joshua Baby
- Starring: Balu Varghese; Siju Wilson
- Cinematography: Ravichandran
- Edited by: Abhilash Mohan
- Music by: Rahul Raj
- Release date: 4 October 2024
- Country: India
- Language: Malayalam

Pushpaka Vimanam is a 2024 Indian Malayalam crime thriller film about two friends who are coerced into committing a crime by a mysterious caller who blackmails them with their loved ones.

== Cast ==
- Siju Wilson
- Balu Varghese
- Lena
- Siddique
- Namritha MV
- Padmaraj Ratheesh

== Reception ==
A critic from Times Now rated the film two out of five stars and wrote that "Pushpaka Vimanam had the potential to present something completely new and unique for Malayalam cinema, but has been let down by a screenplay that does not do justice to this interesting premise".
