= Ottayaal Paatha =

2016 Indian Malayalam-language film

- Directed by: Satish Babusenan; Santosh Babusenan
- Written by: Satish Babusenan; Santosh Babusenan
- Starring: K. Kaladharan; Sarath Sabha; Krishnapriya
- Music by: K. Santhosh
- Release date: 2016
- Country: India
- Language: Malayalam

Ottayaal Paatha (lit. 'The Narrow Path') is a 2016 Indian Malayalam-language feature film directed by Satish Babusenan and Santosh Babusenan. The film won the Silver Gateway, the award for the second-best film, at the 18th Jio MAMI Mumbai Film Festival held in October 2016. Ottayaal Paatha was the only Malayalam film screened in the Mumbai festival. The film was also adjudged as the Second Best Film by the jury of the 47th Kerala State Film Awards announced in January 2017. It won the John Abraham Award for Best Malayalam Film in 2016. It was the only Indian movie selected for the competition section of the Cairo International Film Festival held in Cairo in November 2016.

== Cast ==
- Sarath Sabha as Akhil
- Krishnapriya as Nina
- K. Kaladharan as Vikraman
- Prajusha as Mary

== Awards ==
- John Abraham Award for Best Malayalam Film (2016)
