= John Abraham Award for Best Malayalam Film =

Indian film award

- Description: Best film in Malayalam cinema
- Country: India
- Presented by: Federation of Film Societies of India (Kerala Chapter)

The John Abraham Award for Best Malayalam Film is an Indian film award instituted by the Kerala Chapter of the Federation of Film Societies of India in memory of filmmaker John Abraham. The award is given annually since 1998 for the best film in Malayalam.

== List of winners ==
Year	Film	Director	Jury	Ref.
1998	Garshom	P. T. Kunju Muhammed	John Sankaramangalam	
1999	Karunam	Jayaraj	K. R. Mohanan	
2000	Shayanam	M. P. Sukumaran Nair	K. G. George	
2001	Dany	T. V. Chandran	B. Rajeevan	
2002	Nizhalkuthu	Adoor Gopalakrishnan	P. K. Nair	
2003	Arimpara	Murali Nair	K. P. Kumaran	
2004	Kaazhcha	Blessy	Lenin Rajendran	
2005	Chandranilekkoru Vazhi	Biju Varkey	Soorya Krishnamoorthy	
2006	Pulijanmam	Priyanandanan	K. G. George	
2007	Ore Kadal	Shyamaprasad	K. G. Sankara Pillai	
2008	Boomi Malayalam	Adoor Gopalakrishnan	T. V. Chandran	
2009	Raamanam	M. P. Sukumaran Nair	Mani Kaul	
2010	T. D. Dasan Std. VI B	Mohan Raghavan	T. V. Chandran	
2011	Adimadhyantham	Sherrey	K. R. Mohanan	
2012	Annayum Rasoolum	Rajeev Ravi	Lenin Rajendran	
2013	CR No: 89	Sudevan	Sunny Joseph	
2014	Njan Ninnodu Koodeyundu	Priyanandanan	P. T. Kunju Muhammed	
2015	Mundrothuruth	P. S. Manu	Beena Paul	
2016	Ottayaal Paatha	Satish Babusenan, Santosh Babusenan	Sasikumar	
2017	Eeda	B. Ajithkumar	C. V. Balakrishnan	
2018	Bilathikuzhal	Vinu Kolichal	K. G. Jayan	
2019	Kenjira	Manoj Kana	Girish Kasaravalli	
2020	1956, Central Travancore	Don Palathara	Girish Kasaravalli	
2021	Avanovilona	Sherry Govind, Deepesh T.	Girish Kasaravalli	
