= Upacharapoorvam Gunda Jayan =

2023 Malayalam language Film by Arun Vaiga

- Official film poster
- Directed by: Arun Vaiga
- Written by: Rajesh Varma
- Produced by: Sebab K S Dulquer Salmaan
- Starring: Saiju Kurup; Siju Willson
- Cinematography: Eldo Isaac
- Edited by: Kiran Das
- Music by: Bijibal
- Production companies: Caplight Films; Wayfarer Films
- Release date: 25 February 2022
- Running time: 129 minutes
- Country: India
- Language: Malayalam

Upacharapoorvam Gunda Jayan (transl. Courtesy goon Jayan) is a 2022 Indian Malayalam-language comedy drama film directed by Arun Vaiga. The film stars Saiju Kurup and Siju Wilson in the lead roles. Sharaf U Dheen was earlier reported to have been chosen as one of the leads in the film but was replaced by Shabareesh Varma. The film was released after the delay of a few years. This was the first film to be distributed by Dulquer Salmaan's Wayfarer Films.

== Plot ==
The movie opens with Gunda Jayan's flashback where he roughens up a government official at his place of work. Cut to the present, Jayan is an ex-ruffian who has given up his old ways and living decently with his family running a grocery store. His sister gets a marriage alliance from an NRI and Jayan and family almost immediately fixes it, much to the disagreement of his sister's daughter, Anjana who is already in a relationship with someone. Jayan shuts down Anjana threatening her of doing anything against spoiling the family honor. The family gears up for the imminent marriage and starts making the arrangements. On the day before marriage all the guests and relatives start arriving and Anjana's best friend and her fiancé also arrive. Jayan and his neighbor friend Reji are initially suspicious of the friend's fiancé Kiran and suspects him to be the Anjana's boyfriend, but soon their doubts clear up after they learn that he is already engaged to Anjana's friend. Jayan's brother-in-law Sahadevan, his uncle Sugathan and eccentric army brother-in-law Shylappan create ruckus on the previous night in many ways and Kiran handles them all, supplying them with ample liquor and food. He even manages to pacify the half crack cook Pachadi Sura and makes things calm. Towards the night everyone starts crashing in for next days event. Jayan himself locks the bathroom situated outside to avoid any drunkards spoiling it and sleeps outside carrying the key. Come morning he is surprised and upset that the key is missing and there is a long que of all his relatives outside the bathroom.

It is revealed at this point that Kiran is Anjana's lover after all and he is trying to upset the marriage. He had mixed laxatives in the previous days booze and snacks of the drunkards, a generous portion of which Jayan also ate and drank. He then uses their common friend, the girl who pretends to be the Anjana's friend to damage the one bathroom inside the house main bedroom so that Jayan cannot use it. Amidst the confusion and resulting chaos, Jayan tries to use the bathroom of the neighbor, but Kiran manages to cut off the water supply. The groom and party arrive eventually, and Kiran had arranged an unsuspecting passerby played by Jaffer Idukki to mingle in the marriage crowd and spread false tales about the bride and grooms’ previous affairs among the crowd. The photographer Majeed arranged by Jayan is angry at the groom's party since their official photographer belittles him. Kiran manages to convince the pompous groom that they should shoot a dance video when the groom enters the mandapam and the uncle will be carrying the groom on his shoulders that time and all his friends dancing around him. Jayan refuses to do so and Sahadevan volunteers. Just as Sahadevan carries the groom at the mandapam and in a moment of silence, somebody lets out a loud fart and Kiran makes it look like it was done by the groom himself. An argument starts between both parties and soon escalates into a full-fledged fight, the wedding getting called off eventually. Jayan's family initially considering marrying Anjana to their Uncle Purushan's son but drops the idea since Jayan doesn't like them. Jayan's wife suggests the neighbor Reji's name since they had already tried to get in touch with the girl's former lover and he was no longer interested since she agreed for the marriage with another person. Jayan convinces Reji and he is married off to Anjana finally.

It's revealed in the climax that Reji was Anjana‘a lover all along and Kiran was Reji's friend who came to the marriage house with his real fiancé Tina to help his friend and lover. He falsely reveals himself as the lover to the wedding electrician since he did not want anyone find out Reji's true intentions even by mistake. He successfully creates chaos by upsetting everyone's stomach and escalating the confusion. Finally in a twist of events, the photographer Majeed purposefully has his assistant let out a fart and humiliate the groom and party which again works in Reji's favor. It's also revealed that the kid who watched his father getting beaten up by Jayan in the beginning of the movie is Reji himself and this is a sweet revenge from his part.

== Cast ==
- Saiju Kurup as Gunda Jayan
- Siju Wilson as Kiran
- Shabareesh Varma as Reji
- Johny Antony as Purushan
- Sagar Surya as Sali
- Sabumon Abdusamad as Sahadevan
- Jaffar Idukki as Kochappan
- Hareesh Kanaran as Pachadi Sura
- Sudheer Karamana as Shylappan
- Shani Shaki as the Pompous Cameraman
- Biju Sopanam as Sugathan
- Vijilesh Karayad as Majeed
- Baiju Ezhupunna as Solomon
- Gokulan as Suni
- Vrinda Menon as Jayan's wife
- Nayana as Anjana
- Shailja as Jalaja
- Parvathy Madhusudan as Tina
- Radha Gomati as Pathmaja
- Uthara as Sajitha
- Abin Paul as Kalyana Chekkan

== Soundtrack ==
Songs
No.	Title	Playback	Length
1.	"Gunda Gunda Gundajayan"	Jayadasan, Jayadasan	2:24
2.	"Chillumani Kayalinte"	Daya Bijibal	3:32
3.	"Avale Avale"	Rajesh Varma, Siju Wilson	3:42

== Reception ==
The Times of India wrote that "the movie miserably fails to elicit laughter taking advantage of such a plot. At many points in the film, more people are laughing on screen rather than among the audience". Goutham VS of The Indian Express opined that "Though the movie is fun in parts, it has a limited premise with base humour. No character, including Gunda Jayan, is given enough screen space". Ajith of On Manorama wrote that "The story covers the events that occur at a village wedding in two days. What makes it unique is its humour layered narrative".
