= Veena Nandakumar =

Indian actress

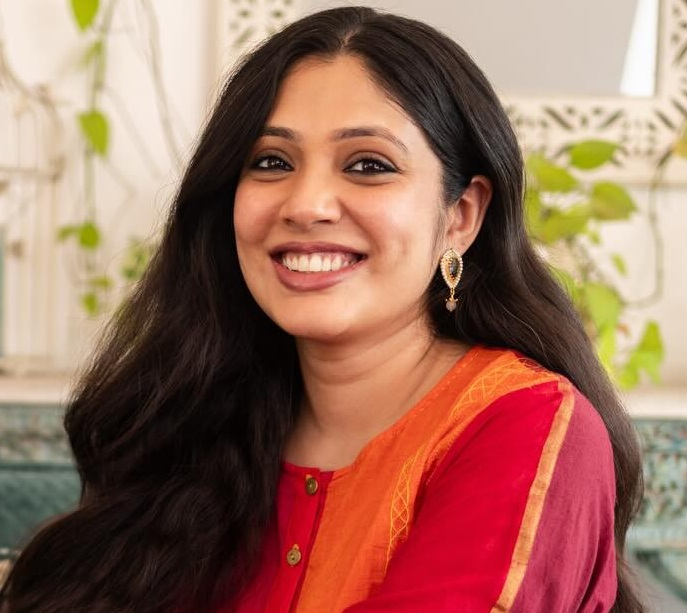
- Veena Nandakumar in 2026
- Born: Veena Nandakumar; Mumbai, Maharashtra, India
- Occupation: Film Actress
- Years active: 2017–present

Veena Nandakumar is an Indian actress who appears in Malayalam films. Her notable works include Kettyolaanu Ente Malakha (2019), Bheeshma Parvam (2022), Voice of Sathyanathan (2023) and Bougainvillea (2024).

== Career ==
Veena Nandakumar made her movie debut through 2017 Malayalam film Kadamkatha directed by Senthil Raj. But she didn't get much attention as the film was a box office failure. She debuted in Tamil language films through Thodraa, in which she played Divya, a girl from a rich family who fell in love and eloped with a low-caste man. Anupama Subramanian of Deccan Chronicle rated her performanceas "decent".

She got her breakthrough role in 2019 Malayalam-language romantic drama film Kettyolaanu Ente Malakha where she played Rincy, "a very restrained" character according to Veena. Anna Mathews of Times of India wrote that the character was "played with just the right amount of restraint" by her.

In 2020, she played supporting roles as Annie in Family Drama film Kozhipporu and Haritha in black comedy psychological thriller film Love. Reviewing Kozhipporu for Times of India, Deepa Soman wrote that she "performed well within the limited scope of the tale".

== Filmography ==
Year	Title	Role	Notes	Ref.
2017	Kadamkadha	Jeena		
2018	Thodraa	Divya	Tamil film	
2019	Kettyolaanu Ente Malakha	Rincy		
2020	Kozhipporu	Annie		
2020	Love	Haritha		
2021	Marakkar: Lion of the Arabian Sea	Princess Aarcha’s Maid	Uncredited role	
2022	Bheeshma Parvam	Jessy		
2023	Voice of Sathyanathan	Susan		
2024	Bougainvillea	Dr. Meera Yasodhara		
2025	Pharma	Nanda	JioHotstar series	
2026	Drishyam 3	Yamini Sahadevan		
2026	Neekkam †	TBA		

== Television ==
- Top Singer 7 as Judge (Flowers TV)
