= Aarkkariyam =

2021 film by Sanu John Varghese

- Promotional poster
- Directed by: Sanu John Varghese
- Written by: Sanu John Varghese; Arun Janardanan; Rajesh Ravi
- Produced by: Aashiq Abu; Santhosh T. Kuruvilla
- Starring: Biju Menon; Sharafudheen; Parvathy Thiruvothu
- Cinematography: G. Srinivas Reddy
- Edited by: Mahesh Narayanan
- Music by: Sanjay Divecha
- Production companies: OPM Cinemas; Moonshot Entertainments
- Release date: 1 April 2021
- Country: India
- Language: Malayalam

Aarkkariyam (transl. Who Knows) is a 2021 Indian Malayalam-language mystery drama film directed and co-written by Sanu John Varghese (in his directorial debut). Co-written by Arun Janardanan and Rajesh Ravi, the film stars Biju Menon, Sharafudheen and Parvathy Thiruvothu. Produced by Aashiq Abu and Santhosh T. Kuruvilla, it was released on 17 May 2021 to highly positive reviews.

== Plot ==
The COVID lockdown of 2020 serves as the backdrop for the narrative. Ittyavira (Itty), a retired math teacher from Kerala, resides alone in Palai, Kottayam. Shirley, his only child, is married to Roy and resides in Mumbai. A businessman by profession, Roy is having some financial troubles. The slowdown by COVID just makes matters worse. Shirley and Roy visit Pala for a vacation. Itty hears about their financial difficulties while they are at Pala and lets them know that he is prepared to sell his estate, which would be more than enough to take care of Roy's financial issues and leave some money for Itty. Itty also wants to dispose off the large property and live in an apartment due to his age and failing health. However, Itty informs Roy that before selling the property, he wants to dig up the skeleton of a man he had killed and buried at the property as construction by the new owner might lead to the discovery of the skeleton.

Roy is shocked at the revelation. The dead man is none other than Shirley's wayward first husband Augustine. The incident happens when Shirley was in hospital after the birth of her daughter and Augustine comes home after months of disappearance and is amused that she was pregnant and had a baby. Itty lets Roy know the circumstances of the crime. Itty also doesn't disclose the crime to his daughter as he believes that everything happens due to God's will.

The crime was never discovered as Augustine used to disappear for long periods and a decomposing body was identified as Augustine's body by his mother and Shirley. Roy is in anguish, he doesn't want to be an abettor in the crime but finally helps Itty dig up the bones and burn it. Old Itty moves into his new apartment and begins to shows signs of dementia.

In the last scene of the movie, Shirley narrates how she was haunted by the pity of the people after Augustine's disappearance and how as a young and dependent mother, she wanted a closure of the events. She admits that she never identified the body as Augustine's mother has identified it. Roy is left with the sinking realization that he would forever carry this secret like a cross to his grave.

== Cast ==
- Biju Menon as Ittyavira
- Sharaf U Dheen as Roy
- Parvathy Thiruvothu as Shirley
- Saiju Kurup as Vyshak
- Arya Salim as Sheeja
- Rahul Reghu as Sundaran
- Jacob George James as Augustin
- Thejaswini Praveen as Sophie
- Shobha Mohan as Sr. Alphonsa
- Prasant Murali as Sajan
- Pramod Velliyanad as Bhasi
- Hareesh Pengan

== Marketing and release ==
Aarkkariyam was released on 1 April. Later it was streaming on Amazon Prime Video, Koode OTT, Neestream, Roots Video and Cave OTT platforms from 19 May.

== Music ==
The music for the film is composed by Neha Nair and Yakzan Gary Periera with lyrics penned by Anwar Ali.

Aarkkariyam

Soundtrack album by Yakzan Gary Pereira and Neha Nair
- Released: 1 April 2021
- Genre: Feature film soundtrack
- Length: 10:24
- Label: 123 Musix Entertainments Pvt. Ltd.
- Producers: Yakzan Gary Pereira and Neha Nair

Yakzan Gary Pereira and Neha Nair chronology
Love (2020)	Aarkkariyam (2021)	Tsunami (2021)
External audio
- Audio Jukebox on YouTube

Aarkkariyam
No.	Title	Artist(s)	Length
1.	"Chiramabhayame"	Madhuvanthi Narayan	3:46
2.	"Doore Maari"	G. Sreeram, Vaikom Vijayalakshmi, Prasanth Prabhakar	2:43
3.	"Kinarilu"	Pushpavathy Poypadathu	3:54
Total length:			10:24

== Accolades ==
Year	Award	Category	Winner	Notes
2021	Kerala State Film Awards	Best Actor	Biju Menon	
2021	Kerala State Film Awards	Best Makeup Artist	Ranjith Ambady	
2022	South Indian International Movie Awards	Critics Choice Award for Best Actor (Malayalam)	Biju Menon	
