= Kenjira =

2021 film by Manu Warrier

- Directed by: Manoj Kana
- Written by: Manoj Kana
- Starring: Vinusha Ravi
- Cinematography: Prathap P Nair
- Release date: 8 December 2019 (IFFK)
- Running time: 81 minutes
- Country: India
- Language: Paniya language

Kenjira is a 2019 Indian film in the Paniya language, a language spoken by members of the Paniya tribe, a secluded tribe most of whose members are mainly found in the Wayanad District in Kerala State and the neighboring areas of Karnataka State. The film was directed by Manoj Kana. Kenjira and stars Vinusha Ravi as a girl belonging to the Paniya community. All other characters in the film are played by members of the tribal community except for Joy Mathew. The film portrays the highly deplorable social conditions in which the Paniya community live: the humiliations, the exploitation and the helplessness.

The film premiered at the 2019 International Film Festival of Kerala. The film was awarded the Kerala State Film Award for Second Best Film at the 50th Kerala State Film Awards. It also won the 2019 John Abraham Award for Best Malayalam Film.
