= Siju Wilson =

Indian actor and producer (born 1981)

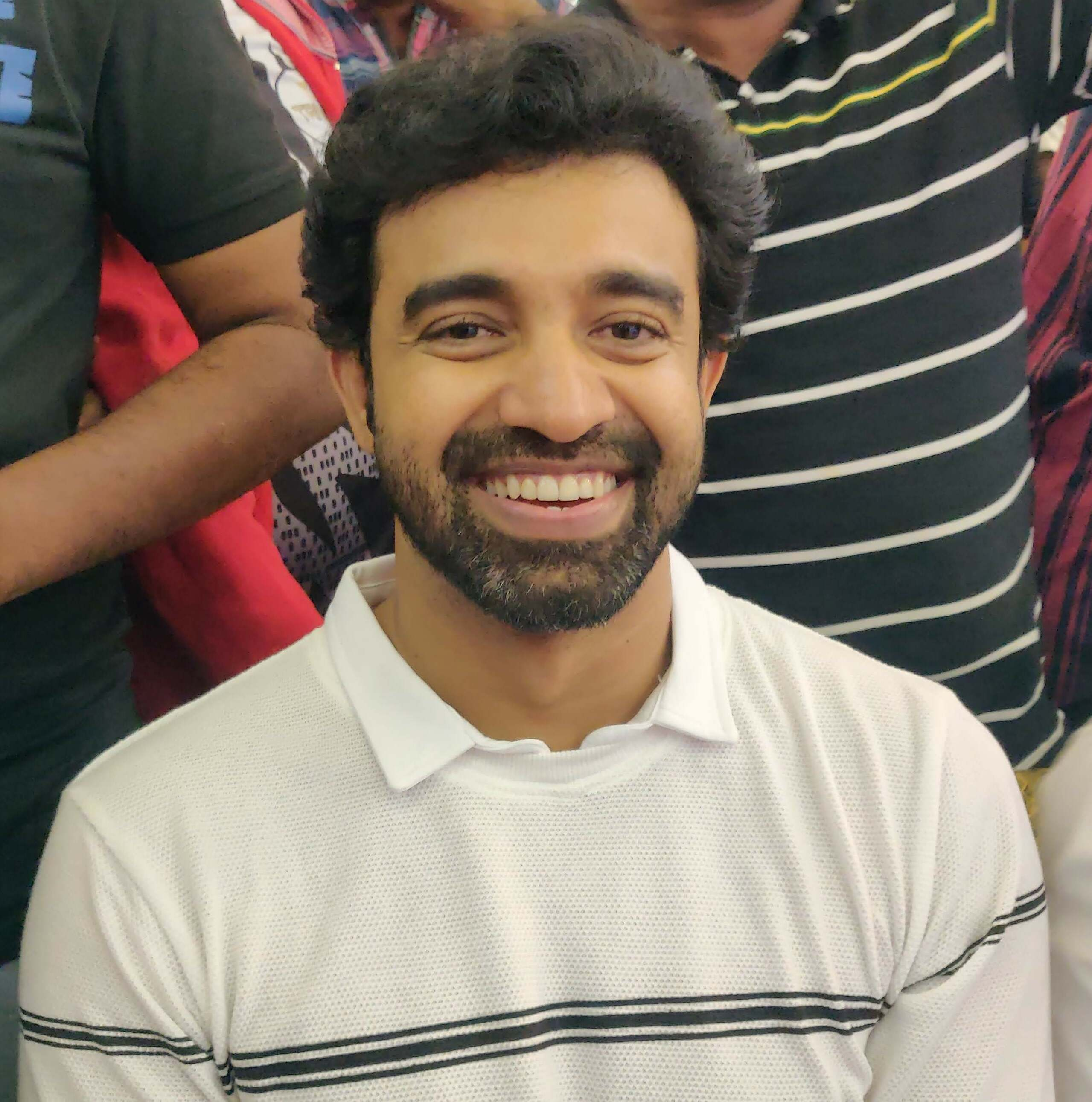
- Siju in 2022
- Born: Wilson Joseph; 22 November 1981 (age 44); Aluva, Kerala, India
- Occupations: Actor; producer
- Years active: 2010–present
- Spouse: Sruthi (m. 2017)
- Children: 1
- Awards: Kerala State Film Awards

Wilson Joseph (born 22 November 1981), professionally credited as Siju Wilson, is an Indian actor and producer, who works in Malayalam films. He won the Kerala State Film Award for Best Film for his debut production Vasanthi (2019).

== Career ==
He completed BSc Nursing. Siju attained recognition through his role as Roy Issac (Royichan) in the show Just fun Chumma telecast on Amrita TV. Later, he appeared in films, of which notable of them are Neram (2013), Premam (2015), Happy Wedding (2016), Kattappanayile Rithwik Roshan (2016), Njandukalude Nattil Oridavela (2017), and Aadhi (2018). Varayan (2022). Wilson produced and acted the film Vasanthi, that won the 2019 Kerala State Film Award for Best Film.

== Personal life ==
Siju Wilson tied the knot with his longtime girlfriend Sruthi on 28 May 2017 at Kochi.

== Filmography ==
=== Films ===
Key
†	Denotes films that have not yet been released

- All films are in Malayalam language unless otherwise noted.

Year	Title	Role	Notes
2010	Malarvadi Arts Club	Mohanlal fans Association President	
2012	Last Bench	Manu's brother	
2013	Neram	John	
2014	Beware of Dogs	Dominic	
2015	Premam	Jojo	
2016	Happy Wedding	Hari	
2016	Kattappanayile Rithwik Roshan	Geo	
2017	Njandukalude Nattil Oridavela	Tony Edayady	
2018	Aadhi	Jayakrishnan	
2018	Thobama	Balu	
2019	Neeyum Njanum	Shanu	
2019	Safe	Dr.Arun	
2019	Varthakal Ithuvare	Vinayachandran	
2020	Mariyam Vannu Vilakkoothi		
2020	Varane Avashyamund	Alphonse Antony	
2020	Vasanthi	Suku	
2021	Innu Muthal	Abhinandhan	
2021	Sara's	Actor Rahul	
2021	Third World Boys	Wilson	
2022	Upacharapoorvam Gunda Jayan	Kiran	
2022	Pathonpatham Noottandu	Arattupuzha Velayudha Panicker	
2022	Saturday Night	Ajith Abraham	
2022	Varayan	Fr.Eby Capuchin	
2022	Gold	Member of the Day Band	
2024	Panchavalsara Padhathi	sanoj	
2024	Samadhana Pusthakam	Alex Xavier	
2024	Pushpaka Vimanam	Ajay	
2025	Detective Ujjwalan	Shambu Mahadev	
2026	Dose		
TBA	Maareechan †	TBA	
TBA	Munnoottu †	TBA	

=== Television ===
Year	Title	Role	Director	Channel
2012-2013	Just Fun Chumma	Roy Issac/Royichan	Pramod Mohan	Amrita TV
2019	Just Fun Chumma 2	Nithin Thomas	Pramod Mohan	Amrita TV

=== Short films ===
Year	Title	Role	Director
2012	Iced Tea	Navin's brother	Pramod Mohan
2013	Moustache Blues	Police Officer	Pranessh Vijayan
2014	Kattan Kaappi	John Pappachi	Arju Benn
2020	Lokam	Wilson	Shabareesh Varma
2021	Ekaa	Amal	Anoop MJ

== Awards ==
- 2019: Kerala State Film Award for Best Film Producer – Vasanthi
