= Kettyolaanu Ente Malakha =

2019 Indian film

- Theatrical release poster
- Directed by: Nissam Basheer
- Written by: Aji Peter Thankam
- Produced by: Listin Stephen; Justin Stephen; Wichu Balamurali
- Starring: Asif Ali; Veena Nandakumar
- Cinematography: Abhilash Sankar
- Edited by: Noufal Abdullah
- Music by: William Francis
- Production company: Magic Frames
- Distributed by: Magic Frames
- Release date: 22 November 2019
- Running time: 135 minutes
- Country: India
- Language: Malayalam
- Budget: ₹3 crore (US$310,000)
- Box office: ₹20 crore (US$2.1 million)

Kettyolaanu Ente Malakha (transl. Wife is my angel; also reported as Kettiyolaanu Ente Malakha) is a 2019 Indian Malayalam-language romantic drama film directed by Nissam Basheer (in his directorial debut), written by Aji Peter Thankam, and produced by Magic Frames. It stars Asif Ali and Veena Nandakumar, Jaffar Idukki, Basil Joseph in the supporting roles. William Francis composed the film's music. The plot follows newly wed Sleevachan and Rincy as they begin their married life.

Kettyolaanu Ente Malakha was released in theatres on 22 November 2019. The film received positive reviews from critics and was a commercial success at the box office.

== Plot ==
Sleevachan, an organic farmer lives with his mother in a village. Despite being over 30 years he has not shown an interest in marriage. Once when he returns home from work, he finds his mother fainted and lying on the kitchen floor. Realising that there should be someone around in the house with his mother while he is away, he decides to get married.

He marries Rincy in an arranged marriage. Since, Sleevachan has not much socialised with women and stays a virgin, he is nervous to approach Rincy for making love. Rincy is comfortable and supportive when Sleevachan tries to make an advance, but he draws back. Each night, Sleevachan makes excuses to stay away from home. Rincy begins to suspect Sleevachan is deliberately avoiding her and, when asked, he avoids her question.

While hanging out with friends, Sleevachan hears them saying that wives have high regards for husbands who has shown them good physical potential during sex. On that night, a drunk Sleevachan starts doing sex on a sleeping Rincy and it accidentally becomes a rape. She gets hospitalized and treated. Sleevachan returns to his senses and realises his mistake. Rincy is heartbroken and tells Sleevachan that she does not want to continue their marriage and asks him to take her back to her home.

In the following days, Sleevachan tries to rectify and reconcile by going out of his way to help Rincy. She, however keeps quiet and discourages him. On the night they part away, Rincy tells she forgives Sleevachan and they decide to remain as a couple, and have sex that night. The credits roll by showing the clips of their honeymoon.

== Cast ==
- Asif Ali as Sleevachan
- Veena Nandakumar as Rincy
- Basil Joseph as Kunjaambi
- Shine Tom Chacko as Shine
- Jaffar Idukki as Kuttiyachan
- Manohari Joy as Eliyamma / Ammachi
- Sminu Sijo as Anna
- Rony David as Richard
- Sruthi Lakshmi as Richard's wife
- Alice as Mariyamma Chettathi
- Santhosh Krishnan as Eldose
- Raveendran as Bombay Sajeevan
- Jayalakshmi as Mercy
- Sini Abraham as Jessy
- Jesna Sibi as Celin
- Anu Anil as Ciscily
- Fr. Eldhose Mathew as Fr. Eldhose
- Sandra Sijo as Teena, Anna's daughter
- Maala Parvathi as Dr. Rosamma
- Anju as Betsy
- Ansar Angamali as Binoy
- Babu Poothara as Babu

== Soundtrack ==
Kettyolaanu Ente Malakha

Soundtrack album by William Francis
- Released: 6 October 2019
- Recorded: 2019
- Genre: Feature film soundtrack
- Label: Magic Frames Music

Lyrics are written by B. K. Harinarayanan and Vinayak Sasikumar, all music is composed by William Francis.

No.	Title	Artist(s)	Length
1.	"Enna Undra"	William Francis	4:14
2.	"Pathivo Maarum"	Niranj Suresh	3:41
3.	"Athmaavile"	Najim Arshad	4:32

== Release ==
The film released on 22 November 2019 across 132 screens in Kerala, to highly positive reviews from the critics as well as the audience. It got the theatre release in Qatar, Oman, Kuwait, Bahrain and UAE on 5 December 2019. It was screened at 51st International Film Festival of India in January 2021 in Indian Panorama section.

=== Critical reception ===
Anna Mathews of The Times of India rated the film with 3 stars out of 5, and said that "there are no tense, twisty moments. It's a simple story, nicely acted by even the supporting cast, and actually feels quite pleasant to watch an uncomplicated love story that makes you tear up and smile at the end". She praised the performances of Asif Ali, Veena Nandakumar and the rest. Baradwaj Rangan of Film Companion wrote that "this could be a fascinating case study of how "arrogance" on screen (like in Arjun Reddy) makes it less easy for us to fully embrace a character, while innocence and humility make us sympathise more readily".

=== Box office ===
The film received positive reviews from the critics and became commercial success. The film collected ₹21.08 lakhs from 6 weeks in the United States box office.
