= Article 21 (film) =

2023 Indian film

- Directed by: Lenin Balakrishnan
- Written by: Lenin Balakrishnan
- Produced by: Joseph Dhanoop; Praseena
- Starring: Lena; Aju Varghese; Joju George; Romanch Rajendran; Bineesh Kodiyeri
- Cinematography: Ashkar
- Release date: 28 July 2023
- Running time: 163 minutes
- Country: India
- Language: Malayalam

Article 21 is a 2023 Indian film directed and written by Lenin Balakrishnan. The film is Balakrishnan's debut film and revolves around two brothers, Dalapathi and Muthu, who work as rag pickers, with the former brother aspiring to attend school without the knowledge of the challenges he would face.

== Cast ==
- Lena as Thamarai
- Aju Varghese as Vishnu
- Joju George
- Romanch Rajendran
- Bineesh Kodiyeri
- Leswin Ullas
- Nandan Rajesh
- Manohari Joy

== Release ==
=== Theatrical ===
Article 21 was released in theaters in Kerala on 28 July 2023.
