= Vanitha Film Awards =

- Awarded for: Artistic and technical excellence in Malayalam cinema
- Country: India
- Presented by: Vanitha
- First award: 1998
- Final award: Present

Television/radio coverage
- Network: Surya TV (till 2011); Mazhavil Manorama

The Vanitha Film Awards are presented annually by Vanitha, an Indian magazine from the Malayala Manorama group in the south Indian state of Kerala. The awards ceremony was instituted to honour both artistic and technical excellence in the Malayalam language film industry. Held and broadcast annually since 1998, the ceremony has gained in popularity over the years and is currently one of the most-watched award ceremonies in Kerala.

== Award categories ==
- Lifetime achievement (special award)
- Best Actor
- Best Actress
- Best Director
- Best Movie
- Popular Movie
- Popular Actor
- Popular Actress
- Special Performance (Male)
- Special Performance (Female)
- Best Supporting Actor (Male)
- Best Supporting Actor (Female)
- Best Comedian
- Best Villain
- Best Star Pair
- Best Newcomer Actor
- Best Newcomer Actress
- Best Lyricist
- Best Music Director
- Best Singer (Male)
- Best Singer (Female)
- Best Cinematographer
- Best Script Writer
- Best Debut Director
- Best Choreographer

== Title sponsors ==
| Year | group | Notes |
|---|---|---|
| 2016–Present | Cera Group | |
| 2010–2015 | TTK Prestige | |
| 2007–2009 | Nippon Paint | |

== Channel partners ==
| Year | Channel | Notes |
|---|---|---|
| 2000–2010 | Surya TV | Broadcast Partner |
| 2012 – present | Mazhavil Manorama | Moved to Sister Channel |

== 2024 ==
The following are the list of the winners of Vanitha Film Awards 2024:

| Category | Winner | Film/ Director |
|---|---|---|
Merit Awards
| Best Film | Nanpakal Nerathu Mayakkam | Lijo Jose Pellissery |
| Most Popular Film | 2018 | Jude Anthany Joseph, Venu Kunnappilly |
| Best Actor | Mammootty | Kaathal – The Core, Kannur Squad and Nanpakal Nerathu Mayakkam |
| Best Actress | Jyothika | Kaathal – The Core |
| Most Popular Actor | Tovino Thomas | 2018 |
| Most Popular Actress | Anaswara Rajan | Neru |
| Best Supporting Actor | Jagadish | Falimy |
| Best Supporting Actress | Manju Pillai | Falimy |
| Best Villain | Siddique | Neru |
| Best Star Pair | Shane Nigam and Mahima Nambiar | RDX |

== 2023 ==
The following are the list of the winners of Vanitha Film Awards 2023

| Category | Winner | Film/ Director |
|---|---|---|
Merit Awards
| Best Film | Nna Thaan Case Kodu | Ratheesh Balakrishna Poduwal |
| Best Actor | Kunchacko Boban | Nna Thaan Case Kodu |
| Best Actress | Darshana Rajendran | Jaya Jaya Jaya Jaya Hey |

== 2022 ==
The following are the list of the winners of Vanitha Film Awards 2022

| Category | Winner | Film/ Director |
|---|---|---|
Merit Awards
| Best Film | Nayattu | Martin Prakkattu |
| Best Actor | Jayasurya | Vellam |
| Best Actress | Nimisha Sajayan | The Great Indian Kitchen |

== 2021 ==
The following are the list of the winners of Vanitha Film Awards 2021

| Category | Winner | Film/ Director |
|---|---|---|
Merit Awards
| Best Film | Ayyappanum Koshiyum | Sachy |
| Best Actor | Prithviraj Sukumaran and Biju Menon | Ayyappanum Koshiyum |
| Best Actress | Shobana | Varane Avashyamund |

== 2020 ==
The following are the list of the winners of Vanitha Film Awards 2020:

| Category | Winner | Film/ Director |
|---|---|---|
Merit Awards
| Best Film | Kumbalangi Nights | Madhu C. Narayanan |
| Most Popular Film | Lucifer | Prithviraj Sukumaran |
| Best Actor | Mohanlal | Lucifer, Ittymaani: Made in China |
| Best Actress | Manju Warrier | Prathi Poovankozhi, Lucifer |
| Most Popular Actor | Asif Ali | Kettyolaanu Ente Malakha |
| Most Popular Actress | Parvathy Thiruvothu | Uyare |
| Best Supporting Actor | Soubin Shahir | Kumbalangi Nights, Virus |
| Best Supporting Actress | Anusree | Prathi Poovankozhi |
| Best Newcomer Actor | Mathew Thomas | Thanneer Mathan Dinangal and Kumbalangi Nights |
| Best Newcomer Actress | Anna Ben | Kumbalangi Nights |
| Special Performance (Actor) | Suraj Venjaramoodu | Android Kunjappan Version 5.25 ,Driving License |
| Special Performance (Actress) | Mamta Mohandas | Kodathi Samaksham Balan Vakeel |
| Best Comedian | Saiju Kurup | Android Kunjappan Version 5.25, Driving License ,Prathi Poovankozhi |
| Best Villain | Vivek Oberoi | Lucifer |
| Best Star Pair | Shane Nigam and Anna Ben | Kumbalangi Nights |
| Best Family Hero | Jayaram | Panchavarnathatha |
| Best Character Actor | Siddique | Uyare |
| Best Character Actress | Nyla Usha | Porinju Mariam Jose |
| Best Social Responsible Movie | Virus | Aashiq Abu |
| Best Social Responsible Actor | Kunchacko Boban | Virus |
| Best Social Responsible Actress | Rima Kallingal | Virus |
| Graceful Performer | Nivin Pauly | Love Action Drama, Moothon |
Technical Awards
| Best Director | Prithviraj Sukumaran | Lucifer |
| Best Script Writer | Shyam Pushkaran | Kumbalangi Nights |
| Best Cinematographer | Gireesh Gangadharan | Jellikatu |
| Best Debut Director | Manu Ashokan | Uyare |
| Best Choreographer | Brinda | Mamankam |
Musical Awards
| Best Singer (Male) | Vijay Yesudas | 'Nee Mukilo'; Uyare |
| Best Singer (Female) | Shreya Ghoshal | 'Mukkuthi'; Mamankam |
| Best Music Director | P S Jayhari | Athiran |
| Best Lyricist | B.K.Harinarayanan | Luca, Edakkadu Bettalion, Madhura Raja |
Special Award
| Lifetime Achievement Award | Sarada | Being best actress in 1960's-80's. |

== 2019 ==
The following are the list of the winners of Vanitha Film Awards 2019:

| Category | Winner | Film/ Director |
|---|---|---|
Merit Awards
| Best Film | Ee.Ma.Yau. | Lijo Jose Pellissery |
| Most Popular Film | Njan Prakashan | Sathyan Anthikad |
| Best Actor | Mohanlal | Odiyan |
| Best Actress | Manju Warrier | Odiyan, Aami |
| Most Popular Actor | Tovino Thomas | Oru Kuprasidha Payyan, Ente Ummante Peru |
| Most Popular Actress | Aishwarya Lekshmi | Varathan |
| Best Supporting Actor | Siddique | Odiyan, Aanakkallan |
| Best Supporting Actress | Muthumani | Uncle |
| Best Newcomer Actor | Kalidas Jayaram | Poomaram |
| Best Newcomer Actress | Saniya Iyappan | Queen |
| Special Performance (Actor) | Joju George | Joseph |
| Special Performance (Actress) | Urvashi | Ente Ummante Peru, Aravindante Athidhikal |
| Best Comedian | Hareesh Perumanna | Oru Pazhaya Bomb Kadha, Aanakkallan |
| Best Villain | Sunny Wayne | Kayamkulam Kochunni |
| Best Star Pair | Vineeth Sreenivasan and Nikhila Vimal | Aravindante Athidhikal |
| Best Family Hero | Jayaram | Panchavarnathatha |
| Best Tamil Actor | Dhanush | Vada Chennai |
| Best Tamil Actress | Trisha | 96 |
Technical Awards
| Best Director | Lijo Jose Pellissery | Ee.Ma.Yau. |
| Best Script Writer | Shahi Kabir | Joseph |
| Best Cinematographer | Shyju Khalid | Sudani from Nigeria |
| Best Debut Director | Zakariya Mohammed | Sudani from Nigeria |
| Best Choreographer | Dinesh | Oru Pazhaya Bomb Kadha |
Musical Awards
| Best Singer (Male) | Vijay Yesudas | 'Poomuthole'; Joseph |
| Best Singer (Female) | Shreya Ghoshal | 'Manam Thudukkanu'; Odiyan |
| Best Music Director | M. Jayachandran | Odiyan |
| Best Lyricist | Rafeeq Ahammed | Odiyan |
| Best Duet Song | Sudeep Kumar and Shreya Ghoshal | 'Kondoram'; Odiyan |
Special Award
| Lifetime Achievement Award | Balachandra Menon | Being best actor in 1990s. |

== 2018 ==
The following are the list of the winners of Vanitha Film Awards 2018:

| Category | Winner | Film/ Director |
|---|---|---|
Merit Awards
| Best Film | Take Off | Mahesh Narayanan |
| Most Popular Film | Udaharanam Sujatha | Phantom Praveen |
| Best Actor | Fahadh Faasil, Suraj Venjarammoodu | Thondimuthalum Driksakshiyum |
| Best Actress | Parvathy | Take Off |
| Best Actress | Manju Warrier | Udaharanam Sujatha |
| Most Popular Actor | Dulquer Salmaan | Parava, Solo |
| Best Supporting Actor | Suraj Venjaramoodu | Thondimuthalum Driksakshiyum |
| Best Supporting Actress | Shanthi Krishna | Njandukalude Nattil Oridavela |
| Best Newcomer Actor | Appani Sarath | Velipadinte Pusthakam |
| Best Newcomer Actress | Nimisha Sajayan | Thondimuthalum Driksakshiyum |
| Special Performance (Actor) | Jayasurya | Aadu 2 |
| Special Performance (Actress) | Anu Sithara | Ramante Eden Thottam |
| Best Comedian | Hareesh Perumanna | Various |
| Best Villain | Vijayaraghavan | Ramaleela, Punyalan Private limited |
| Best Star Pair | Asif Ali and Aparna Balamurali | Sunday Holiday |
| Best Romantic Hero | Tovino Thomas | Mayaanadhi |
| Best Romantic Heroine | Aishwarya Lekshmi | Mayaanadhi |
| Best Family Hero | Kunchacko Boban | Ramante Eden Thottam, Take Off |
Technical Awards
| Best Director | Dileesh Pothan | Thondimuthalum Driksakshiyum |
| Best Script Writer | Syam Pushkaran and Dileesh Nair | Mayaanadhi |
| Best Debut Director | Soubin Shahir | Parava |
| Best Choreographer | Prasanna Sujit | |
Musical Awards
| Best Singer (Male) | Vijay Yesudas | 'Kattilila Polengo'; Udaharanam Sujatha |
| Best Singer (Female) | Shweta Mohan | 'Oru Puzhayarikil'; Munthirivallikal Thalirkkumbol |
| Best Music Director | Shaan Rahman | Velipadinte Pusthakam |
| Best Lyricist | Hari Narayanan | Adam Joan |
Special Awards
| Lifetime Achievement Award | Seema | Actress |

== 2017 ==
The following are the list of the winners of Vanitha Film Awards 2017:

| Category | Winner | Film/ Director |
|---|---|---|
Merit Awards
| Best Film | Maheshinte Prathikaaram | Dileesh Pothan |
| Most Popular Film | Pulimurugan | Vysakh |
| Best Movie on Social Awareness | Action Hero Biju | Abrid Shine |
| Best Actor | Mohanlal | Oppam, Pulimurugan |
| Best Actress | Manju Warrier | Karinkunnam 6'S |
| Most Popular Actor | Nivin Pauly | Action Hero Biju, Jacobinte Swargarajyam |
| Most Popular Actress | Anusree | Oppam, Maheshinte Prathikaaram, Kochavva Paulo Ayyappa Coelho |
| Best Supporting Actor | Siddique | Kattappanayile Hrithik Roshan, Annmariya Kalippilaanu |
| Best Supporting Actress | Rohini | Action Hero Biju, Guppy |
| Best Newcomer Actor | Vishnu Unnikrishnan | Kattappanayile Hrithik Roshan |
| Best Newcomer Actress | Aparna Balamurali | Maheshinte Prathikaaram |
| Special Performance (Actor) | Vinayakan | Kammatipaadam |
| Special Performance (Actress) | Asha Sarath | Paavada, Anuraga Karikkin Vellam |
| Best Comedian | Dharmajan Bolgatty | Kattappanayile Hrithik Roshan |
| Best Villain | Chemban Vinod Jose | Kali |
| Best Star Pair | Asif Ali and Rajisha Vijayan | Anuraga Karikkin Vellam |
Technical Awards
| Best Director | Rajeev Ravi | Kammatipaadam |
| Best Script Writer | P. Balachandran | Kammatipaadam |
| Best Cinematographer | Shyju Khalid | Maheshinte Prathikaaram |
| Best Debut Director | Khalid Rahman | Anuraga Karikkin Vellam |
| Best Choreographer | Kala | Oppam |
Musical Awards
| Best Singer (Male) | M. G. Sreekumar | 'Chinnamma'; Oppam |
| Best Singer (Female) | Vani Jayaram | 'Maanathe Maari'; Pulimurugan |
| Best Music Composer | Bijibal | Maheshinte Prathikaaram |
| Best Lyricist | Santosh Varma | Action Hero Biju |
Special Award
| Lifetime Achievement Award | K. G. George | Director |

== 2016 ==
The following are the list of the winners of Vanitha Film Awards 2016:

| Category | Winner | Film/ Director |
|---|---|---|
Merit Awards
| Best Film | Ennu Ninte Moideen | R. S. Vimal |
| Most Popular Film | Premam | Alphonse Putharen |
| Best Actor | Prithviraj Sukumaran | Ennu Ninte Moideen |
| Best Actress | Parvathy | Ennu Ninte Moideen |
| Most Popular Actor | Nivin Pauly | Premam |
| Most Popular Actress | Namitha Pramod | Chandrettan Evideya, Amar Akbar Anthony, Adi Kapyare Kootamani |
| Best Supporting Actor | Chemban Vinod Jose | Oru Second Class Yathra, Charlie |
| Best Supporting Actress | Lena | Ennu Ninte Moideen |
| Best Newcomer Actor | Krishna Shankar, Sharaf U Dheen and Shabareesh Varma | Premam |
| Best Newcomer Actress | Sai Pallavi | Premam |
| Special Performance (Actor) | Jayasurya | Su Su Sudhi Vathmeekam |
| Special Performance (Actress) | Rima Kallingal | Rani Padmini |
| Best Comedian | Aju Varghese | Oru Vadakkan Selfie, Two Countries |
| Best Villain | Nedumudi Venu | Oru Second Class Yathra |
| Best Star Pair | Dileep and Mamta Mohandas | Two Countries |
Technical Awards
| Best Director | R. S. Vimal | Ennu Ninte Moideen |
| Best Script Writer | Salim Ahamed | Pathemari |
| Best Cinematographer | Jomon T. John | Ennu Ninte Moideen, Charlie |
| Best Debut Director | John Varghese | Adi Kapyare Kootamani |
| Best Choreographer | Dinesh | Amar Akbar Anthony |
Musical Awards
| Best Singer (Male) | Vijay Yesudas | Premam |
| Best Singer (Female) | Vaikom Vijayalakshmi | Oru Vadakkan Selfie |
| Best Music Director | Rajesh Murugesan | Premam |
| Best Lyricist | Rafeeq Ahammed | Ennu Ninte Moideen |
Special Award
| Lifetime Achievement Award | K. P. A. C. Lalitha | Actress |

== 2015 ==
The following are the list of the winners of Vanitha Film Awards 2015:

| Category | Winner | Film/ Director |
|---|---|---|
Merit Awards
| Best Film | 1983 | Abrid Shine |
| Best Actor | Mammootty | Varsham |
| Best Actress | Manju Warrier | How Old Are You? |
| Most Popular Actor | Nivin Pauly | 1983 |
| Most Popular Actress | Nazriya Nazim | Ohm Shanthi Oshaana, Bangalore Days |
| Best Supporting Actor | Anoop Menon | Vikramadithyan |
| Best Supporting Actress | Srinda Ashab | 1983 |
| Best Newcomer Actor | Farhaan Faasil | Njan Steve Lopez |
| Best Newcomer Actress | Nikki Galrani | 1983 |
| Best Comedian | Aju Varghese | Vellimoonga |
| Best Villain | Jayasurya | Iyobinte Pusthakam |
| Best Star Pair | Unni Mukundan and Namitha Pramod | Vikramadithyan |
Technical Awards
| Best Screenplay | Bobby–Sanjay | How Old Are You? |
| Best Cinematographer | Amal Neerad | Iyobinte Pusthakam |
Musical Awards
| Best Singer (Male) | Vineeth Sreenivasan | "Kaattumooliyo"; Ohm Shanthi Oshaana |
| Best Singer (Female) | Shreya Ghoshal | "Vijanathayil"; How Old Are You? |
| Best Music Director | M. Jayachandran | Odiyan |
| Best Lyricist | Hari Narayanan | 1983 |
| Popular Song of the Year | Gopi Sundar | "Mangalyam Thanthunanena"; Bangalore Days |
Special Award
| Lifetime Achievement Award | I. V. Sasi | Director |

== 2014 ==
The following are the list of the winners of Vanitha Film Awards 2014:

| Category | Winner | Film/ Director |
|---|---|---|
Merit Awards
| Best Film | Drishyam | Jeethu Joseph |
| Most Popular Film | Amen | Lijo Jose Pellissery |
| Best Actor | Prithviraj Sukumaran | Celluloid, Mumbai Police |
| Best Actress | Shobana | Thira |
| Best Supporting Actor | Indrajith Sukumaran | Amen |
| Best Supporting Actress | Bindu Panicker | Pullipulikalum Aattinkuttiyum |
| Best Newcomer Actor | Sanoop Santhosh | Philips and the Monkey Pen |
| Best Newcomer Actress | Aparna Gopinath | ABCD |
| Most Popular Actor | Dileep | Sound Thoma, Sringaravelan |
| Most Popular Actress | Amala Paul | Oru Indian Pranayakadha |
| Best Comedian | Shammi Thilakan | Neram, Sringaravelan |
| Best Villain | Kalabhavan Shajohn | Drishyam |
Technical Awards
| Best Director | Jeethu Joseph | Drishyam |
| Best Script Writer | Joy Mathew | Shutter |
| Best Cinematographer | Madhu Neelakandan | Annayum Rasoolum |
Musical Awards
| Best Singer (Male) | Shahabaz Aman | "Kayalinarike"; Annayum Rasoolum |
| Best Singer (Female) | Mridula Warrier | "Lalee lalee"; Kalimannu |
| Best Music Director | Prashant Pillai | Amen |
| Best Lyricist | Kavalam Narayana Panicker | Amen |
Special Award
| Lifetime Achievement Award | Innocent | Actor |

== 2013 ==
The following are the list of the winners of Vanitha Film Awards 2013:

| Category | Winner | Film/ Director |
|---|---|---|
Merit Awards
| Best Film | Ustad Hotel | Anwar Rasheed |
| Best Actor | Fahadh Faasil | Diamond Necklace, 22 Female Kottayam |
| Best Actress | Rima Kallingal | 22 Female Kottayam |
| Best Supporting Actor | Prathap Pothan | Ayalum Njanum Thammil |
| Best Supporting Actress | Kanika | Bavuttiyude Namathil |
| Best Newcomer Actress | Isha Talwar | Thattathin Marayathu |
| Best Comedian | Baburaj | Mayamohini |
| Best Villain | Murali Gopy | Ee Adutha Kaalathu, Thappana |
| Best Pair | Dulquer Salmaan & Nithya Menen | Ustad Hotel |
Technical Awards
| Best Director | Lal Jose | Ayalum Njanum Thammil, Diamond Necklace |
| Best Script Writer | Anjali Menon | Ustad Hotel |
| Best Cinematographer | Shyju Khalid | 22 Female Kottayam |
Musical Awards
| Best Singer (Male) | Nivas | "Nilamalare"; Diamond Necklace |
| Best Singer (Female) | Remya Nambeesan | 'Muthuchippi'; Thattathin Marayathu |
| Best Music Director | Shaan Rahman | Thattathin Marayathu |
| Best Lyricist | Rafeeq Ahammed | Spirit, Diamond Necklace |
Special Award
| Lifetime Achievement Award | Nedumudi Venu | Actor |

== 2012 ==
The following are the list of the winners of Vanitha Film Awards 2012:

| Category | Winner | Film/ Director |
|---|---|---|
Merit Awards
| Best Film | Indian Rupee | Ranjith |
| Best Actor | Mohanlal | Pranayam |
| Best Actress | Kavya Madhavan | Khaddama |
| Best Supporting Actor | Anoop Menon | Beautiful |
| Best Supporting Actress | Remya Nambeesan | Chaappa Kurishu |
| Best Newcomer Actor | Unni Mukundan | Bombay March 12 |
| Best Newcomer Actress | Karthika Nair | Makaramanju |
| Best Comedian | Baburaj | Salt N' Pepper |
| Best Villain | Vijayaraghavan | Venicile Vyapari |
| Best Star Pair | Lal and Shwetha Menon | Salt N' Pepper |
Technical Awards
| Best Director | Aashiq Abu | Salt N' Pepper |
| Best Cinematographer | Jomon T. John | Beautiful |
Musical Awards
| Best Singer (Male) | Vijay Yesudas | "Ee Puzhayum"; Indian Rupee |
| Best Singer (Female) | Manjari | "Chimmi Chimmi"; Urumi |
| Best Music Director | Bijibal | Salt N' Pepper |
| Best Lyricist | O. N. V. Kurup | Pranayam |
Special Award
| Lifetime Achievement Award | Sheela | Actress |

== 2011 ==
The following are the list of the winners of Vanitha Film Awards 2011:

| Category | Winner | Film/ Director |
|---|---|---|
Merit Awards
| Best Film | Pranchiyettan & the Saint | Ranjith |
| Most Popular Film | Pranchiyettan & the Saint | Ranjith |
| Best Actor | Mammootty | Pranchiyettan & the Saint |
| Best Actress | Mamta Mohandas | Kadha Thudarunnu |
| Best Supporting Actor | Biju Menon | Marykkundoru Kunjaadu |
| Best Supporting Actress | Mithra Kurian | Body Guard |
| Best Newcomer Actress | Ann Augustine | Elsamma Enna Aankutty |
| Best Comedian | Salim Kumar | Best Actor, Marykkundoru Kunjaadu |
| Best Villain | Siddique, Manoj K.Jayan | Pokkiri Raja, Drona 2010 |
| Best Star Pair | Kunchacko Boban and Archana Kavi | Mummy & Me |
Technical Awards
| Best Director | Ranjith | Pranchiyettan & the Saint |
| Best Script Writer | Ranjith | Pranchiyettan & the Saint |
| Best Cinematographer | Venu | Pranchiyettan & the Saint |
Musical Awards
| Best Singer (Male) | Yesudas | "Pinne Ennodonnum"; Shikkar |
| Best Singer (Female) | Shreya Ghoshal | "Kizhakku Pookkum"; Anwar |
| Best Music Director | Gopi Sunder | Anwar |
| Best Lyricist | Rafeeq Ahammed | Anwar |
Special Award
| Lifetime Achievement Award | Jagathy Sreekumar | Actor |

== 2010 ==
The following are the list of the winners of Vanitha Film Awards 2010:

| Category | Winner | Film/ Director |
|---|---|---|
Merit Awards
| Best Film | Pazhassi Raja | Hariharan |
| Best Actor | Mammootty | Pazhassi Raja, Paleri Manikyam: Oru Pathirakolapathakathinte Katha, Loudspeaker |
| Best Actress | Padmapriya | Pazhassi Raja |
| Most Popular Actor | Mohanlal | Bhramaram, Evidam Swargamanu |
| Best Supporting Actor | R. Sarathkumar | Pazhassi Raja |
| Best Supporting Actress | Shwetha Menon | Paleri Manikyam: Oru Pathirakolapathakathinte Katha |
| Best Newcomer Actor | Kailash | Neelathamara |
| Best Newcomer Actress | Rima Kallingal | Ritu |
| Best Comedian | Suraj Venjaramoodu | Chattambinadu |
| Best Villain | Siddique | Chattambinadu |
Technical Awards
| Best Director | Ranjith | Paleri Manikyam: Oru Pathirakolapathakathinte Katha |
| Best Script Writer | James Albert | Evidam Swargamanu |
| Best Cinematographer | Ajayan Vincent | Bhramaram |
Musical Awards
| Best Singer (Male) | Yesudas | Pazhassi Raja |
| Best Singer (Female) | K.S.Chitra | |
| Best Lyricist | Vayalar Sarath Chandra Varma | Neelathamara, Chattambinadu |
| Best Song | Vidyasagar | "Anuragavilochithanayi"; Neelathamara |
Special Award
| Lifetime Achievement Award | Madhu | Actor |

== Superlatives ==
Most frequent winners
| Artist | Wins |
|---|---|
| Mohanlal | 10 |
| Manju Warrier; Shreya Ghoshal; Vijay Yesudas | 5 |
| Mammootty; Dulquer Salmaan; Nivin Pauly; Siddique; Parvathy Thiruvothu | 4 |
| Jayasurya; Suraj Venjaramoodu; Kavya Madhavan; Meera Jasmine; Rafeeq Ahammed; Ranjith; K. J. Yesudas; K. S. Chithra | 3 |
