= Thirimali =

2022 Malayalam Film

- Official poster
- Directed by: Rajiv Shetty
- Written by: Xavier Alex; Rajiv Shetty
- Produced by: SK Lawrence
- Starring: Vishnu Unnikrishnan; Tini Tom; Mareena Michael Kurisingal; Musthafa; Anna Rajan; Irshad
- Cinematography: Faizal Ali
- Edited by: V Saajan
- Music by: Sreejith Edavana
- Production company: Angle Maria Cinema
- Release date: 27 January 2022
- Country: India
- Language: Malayalam

Thirimali (lit. 'Cheat') is a 2022 Indian Malayalam-language comedy drama film directed by Rajiv Shetty and produced by SK Lawrence. under the banner of Angel Maria Cinemas. It features Bibin George, Swastima Khadka, Johny Antony, Dharmajan Bolgatty, Anna Rajan, Naseer Sankranthi, Hareesh Kanaran, and Innocent in the main cast. It was released on 27 January 2022.

== Cast ==
- Bibin George as Baby
- Swastima Khadka as Bar dancer
- Johny Antony as Alexander Parinjappan
- Dharmajan Bolgatty as Peter a.k.a. Tour Peter
- Anna Rajan as Jancy
- Naseer Sankranthi as Mathai
- Hareesh Kanaran as Jackson
- Innocent as Devassy
- Salim Kumar as Avarachan
- Aziz Nedumangad as Advocate Vinayachandran
- Sohan Seenulal as Police Writer Bijulal
- Namrata Aryal as Maina
- Umesh Tamang as Veer

== Production ==
The film was announced on 27 October 2020 with the first look poster. Vivek Muzhakkunnu was announced as the first time lyricist. Some of the film was shot on location in Manali, Himachal Pradesh and Kathmandu, Pokhara and Mustang in Nepal.

== Controversy ==
"Rang Birang", an item song in the film was found to have used the photographs of Nepali actresses Aditi Budhathoki and Jasita Gurung without their consent. Later, the producer removed the photos from the video.

== Reception ==
The film was released on 27 January 2022. A critic from Onmanorama wrote that "The song can rival any peppy Bollywood number and features Nepali actress Swastima Khadka ". Megha Mukundan critic of OTTplay gave 2 out of 5 stars and stated that "The movie is a one-time watch for the soulful visuals it offers with the ear-pleasing background music. But you might want to think twice if you cannot tolerate a dull storyline even with actors doing their best.". Critics from ManoramaOnline and Samayam gave mixed reviews.
