= Vineeth Thattil David =

Indian actor

- Other name: Vineeth Thattil
- Citizenship: Indian
- Occupation: Actor
- Years active: 2017 - present

Vineeth Thattil David (also referred to simply as Vineeth Thattil) is an Indian film actor who works in Malayalam film industry. He is known for his roles in Ayyappanum Koshiyum and Thrissur Pooram.

== Career ==
Vineeth Thattil David began his career in 2017 in Angamaly Diaries as Kadan Benny.

== Filmography ==
Year	Title	Role	Notes	Ref.
2017	Angamaly Diaries	Kadan Benny	Debut film	
2017	Aadu 2	Kaippuzha Kunjappan	Cameo	
2019	June	Police Officer		
2019	Thrissur Pooram	Siby		
2020	Ayyappanum Koshiyum	Simon		
2022	Peace	Ravi Castilla		
2022	Eesho	Hitman		
2022	Ini Utharam	Nazar		
2022	Thattassery Koottam	Kalan Anthru		
2022	Gold	Usman		
2023	Voice of Sathyanathan	Balan’s brother-in-law		
2023	Thankam	Bejoy		
2024	Vivekanandan Viralanu	CI Hameed		
2024	Anweshippin Kandethum	Const. Chandrasenan		
2024	Thundu	Kannan		
2024	Turbo	Arival Sabu		
2024	Mandakini	Unni Aliyan		
2024	Adios Amigo	Driver Sujith		
2024	Pattapakal	CI Baby SI		
2024	Vishesham	SI Johny		
2024	Swargam			
2024	ED: Extra Decent	Sananthan		
2025	Daveed			
2025	Machante Maalakha	Ramesan		
2025	Prince and Family	Police officer		
2025	Koodal			
2025	Odum Kuthira Chaadum Kuthira	Sadashivan Nair		
2025	Innocent	Police Inspector		
2026	Spa			
2026	Bhishmar			
2026	Karakkam			
2026	Uyir			
2026	Pluto	Mallan		
2026	Avaraachan & Sons			
2026	Disco †	TBA		

== Controversies ==
On 25 July 2022, He was charged with attempt to murder and was arrested for assaulting a man.
