= Bad Boyz (film) =

2024 Indian film

- Theatrical release poster
- Directed by: Omar Lulu
- Screenplay by: Sarang Jayaprakash
- Story by: Omar Lulu
- Produced by: Abraham Mathew
- Starring: Rahman; Babu Antony; Sheelu Abraham; Dhyan Sreenivasan; Bibin George; Anson Paul; Senthil Krishna
- Cinematography: Alby Antony
- Edited by: Dileep Dennies
- Music by: William Francis
- Production company: Abaam Movies
- Release date: 13 September 2024
- Running time: 148 minutes
- Country: India
- Language: Malayalam

Bad Boyz is a 2024 Indian Malayalam-language action comedy film directed by Omar Lulu and written by Sarang Jayaprakash from a story by Lulu. Produced by Abraham Mathew for Abaam Movies, the film stars Rahman, Babu Antony, Sheelu Abraham,Dhyan Sreenivasan, Bibin George, Anson Paul, and Senthil Krishna.

The film was theatrically released on 13 September 2024.

== Plot ==
The story revolves around Antappan and his friends: Sintappan, Alosh and Chakkara who are part of bad boys arts and sports club.

Antappan and his friends are wannabe goons in Kochi. They do paid fight with another wannabe goons. While Antappan is living his wannabe life he encounters with a situation with Vettukadu Belson when a chain snatcher snatches chain from Antappan's wife.

They follow the snatcher in their car and encounters with Belson’s Gypsy. Immediately Antappan and gang had conflict with Belson alone and one Antappan’s friend hits Belson head. Belson losses his conciseness. Antappan and his friends had no idea it was Belson until one of his friend read a livery on Belson’s car.

They ran to their home and packed stuffs for evolve from the town. While they were leaving and reached in front of their home Belson's henchmen, Althara Ambadi and Kalikavu Suni arrives at their home.

While Antappan is getting ready for a fight with Belson's henchmen, they arrived for joining as Antappan's henchmen. Antappan was not ready to take them but his wife requested him to accept him. Antappan accepts them and makes a lot of money through Rowdyism.

A new SI take incharge SI Amjath Khan and want Antappan to look up so badly. After some days Antappan gets arrested and looks up in jail for 2 months. After his prison time he gets released and goes back his normal life.

== Cast ==
- Rahman as Mekkattukulam Antappan
- Babu Antony as Vettukadu Belson
- Dhyan Sreenivasan as SI Amjath Khan
- Bibin George as Chaprathottil Sintappan
- Anson Paul as Chakkara
- Senthil Krishna as Kuttikattil Alosh
  - Adhish Praveen as Young Alosh
- Saiju Kurup as Fr. N Joy Koyilandi
- Sheelu Abraham as Mary
- Tini Tom as Kalikkavu Suni aka Kali
- Sudheer Sukumaran as Althara Ambadi aka Thara
- Ramesh Pisharody as Benny aka Rocky
- Aju Varghese as Doctor Philip
- Mallika Sukumaran as Annie teacher
- Harisree Ashokan as Fr. Chakochan "ChurchHill" Pallikunnel
- Motta Rajendran as Daniel
- Sajin Cherukayil as Mosha Kunju
- Bijukuttan as Sathya aka Agent X
- Ajai Vasudev
- Vishnu Unnikrishnan
- Bineesh Bastin
- Vishnu Joshi
- Mafia Sasi as Mafia Sasi
- Sohan Seenulal as Kishenji
- Bala as Producer Kalai Singam Dorai Raj
- Shankar as Prem Menon
- Bheeman Raghu as Bata Sura aka Nippan Sura
- Krishna Prasad as Badusha Khan
- Devan as Antappan's father
- Kulappulli Leela as CPO Leela
- Aradhya Ann as Shobhana
- Arya Menon as Chakkara
- Bineesh Bastin as Martin
- Firoz Khan as Firoz
- Anchor Hyder Ali as Attender
- Mukesh M. Nair as Necklace snatcher
- Sreekanth Vettiyar as News anchor
- Alin Jose Perera as Himself
- Santhosh Varkey as Himself

== Production ==
The film was announced in May 2024. Principal photography was wrapped up in July 2024.

== Release ==
The film was theatrically released on 13 September 2024.

The film began streaming on Amazon Prime Video and ManoramaMAX in April 2025.

=== Reception ===
A critic from Malayala Manorama and Mathrubhumi reviewed the film. Rohit Panikker of Times Now gave the film 2 1/2 stars out of 5 stars.
