= Bhishmar =

Indian film

- Promotional poster
- Directed by: East Coast Vijayan
- Story by: Ansaj Gopi
- Produced by: East Coast Communications Pvt. Ltd
- Starring: Dhyan Sreenivasan; Vishnu Unnikrishnan; Divya Pillai; Ammayraa Goswami
- Cinematography: Ratheesh Ram
- Edited by: Johnkutty
- Music by: Ranjin Raj; K.A. Latheef
- Production company: East Coast
- Release date: 20 March 2026
- Country: India
- Language: Malayalam

Bhishmar (Malayalam: ഭീഷ്മർ) is a 2026 Malayalam romantic comedy thriller film directed by East Coast Vijayan and produced by East Coast Communications Pvt. Ltd. The film stars Dhyan Sreenivasan and Vishnu Unnikrishnan in the lead roles, marking their first collaboration as a duo.

The story is written by Ansaj Gopi. The film features music composed by Ranjin Raj and K.A. Latheef, with cinematography by Ratheesh Ram and editing by Johnkutty. Filming was completed in October 2025 in Palakkad.

The film was released in theatres on 20 March 2026. It received negative reviews from critics.

== Premise ==
Bhishmar is described as a family entertainer that blends elements of romance, comedy, and drama. The story focuses on the lives of the two protagonists, played by Vishnu Unnikrishnan and Dhyan Sreenivasan.

== Cast ==
- Dhyan Sreenivasan as Murugan
- Vishnu Unnikrishnan as Aravindan / Sulthan
- Divya Pillai as Gouri
- Ammayra Goswami as Rasiya
- Indrans as Valiya Haji
- Senthil Krishna as Guru
- Gibin Gopinath
- Manikandan Achari
- Santhosh Keezhattoor as Razak
- Abu Salim
- Shaju Sreedhar as Sharath
- Unni Lalu as Sulthan / Aravind
- Jayan Cherthala
- Binu Thrikkakkara
- Akhil Kavalayoor
- Vineeth Thattil David
- Sohan Seenulal
- Vishnu Groovi
- Smriti Pandey

== Production ==
=== Development ===
The film is the 8th production venture by East Coast Communications. It is directed by East Coast Vijayan, following his previous directorial ventures Kallanum Bhagavathiyum (2023) and Chithini (2024). The story and screenplay were penned by Ansaj Gopi, with Sajit Krishnan serving as the Executive Producer.

=== Filming ===
Principal photography commenced in mid-2025. The film was shot extensively in Palakkad and surrounding locations. The production team completed the shoot in a single continuous schedule lasting 42 days, wrapping up on 1 October 2025. A "making-of" video was released by the production house in December 2025, confirming the completion of the shoot.

=== Technical crew ===
The technical team includes Liju Prabhakar as the colourist and Nithin Ram Neduvathoor handling visual effects. Sound design is by Sachin Sudhakaran, with Atmos mixing by Vishnu Sujathan. Phoenix Prabhu and Mafia Sasi provided the action choreography.

== Music ==
The film's soundtrack features songs composed by Ranjin Raj and K.A. Latheef. The lyrics are penned by Santhosh Varma, B.K. Harinarayanan, and O.M. Karuvarakkundu. The audio rights are held by East Coast Audio Entertainments.

== Reception ==
=== Critical reception ===
Anjana George of The Times of India rated the film 2/5 stars and noted that the film "leans into stillness, and while that works in moments, it also makes the narrative feel a little too loose at times" and wrote, "Bhishmar ultimately feels like a soft conversation that comes close to saying something beautiful, but stops just before it truly does."

R. B. Sreelekha of Manorama Online wrote that the film "promises a captivating narrative of love and survival, drawing parallels between past and present generations."Sreelekha, R. B. (21 March 2026). "കംപ്ലീറ്റ് ഫാമിലി പാക്കേജ്; 'ഭീഷ്മർ' റിവ്യൂ Bheeshmar Review" [Complete Family Package; 'Bhishmar' Review]. Manorama Online (in Malayalam).

Anjay Das of Mathurbhumi wrote, "Bhishmar is an engaging entertainer featuring Dhyan Sreenivasan and Vishnu Unnikrishnan that explores love and humor through a series of events unfolding over a single night in Palakkad."

Vivek Santhosh of The New Indian Express rated the film 1/5 and wrote, "A painfully dated and disjointed blend of romance and comedy thriller, East Coast Vijayan and Dhyan Sreenivasan's film leaves behind nothing but fatigue."
