= Oru Yamandan Premakadha =

2019 film by B.C. Noufal

Oru Yamandan Premakatha
- Film poster
- Directed by: B. C. Noufal
- Written by: Bibin George; Vishnu Unnikrishnan
- Produced by: Anto Joseph; C. R. Salim
- Starring: Dulquer Salmaan; Salim Kumar; Soubin Shahir; Vishnu Unnikrishnan; Nikhila Vimal; Samyuktha
- Cinematography: P. Sukumar
- Edited by: Johnkutty
- Music by: Songs: Nadirshah; Background Score: Bijibal
- Production companies: AJ Film Company; Al–Tari Movies
- Distributed by: Aan Mega Media
- Release date: 25 April 2019
- Running time: 158 minutes
- Country: India
- Language: Malayalam

Oru Yamandan Premakadha (transl. A big love story) is a 2019 Indian Malayalam-language comedy thriller film directed by B. C. Noufal (in his directorial debut) and written by Bibin George and Vishnu Unnikrishnan. It stars Dulquer Salmaan, Soubin Shahir, Salim Kumar, and Vishnu Unnikrishnan in the lead roles and Nikhila Vimal and Samyuktha in female lead. The film's production began on 3 July 2017 and was wrapped up in Kochi. It was released on 25 April 2019.

== Plot ==
Set in Kadamakkudy, the film revolves around Lallu, a privileged daily wage painter and his colorful gang of friends. Although he comes from an aristocratic family and is the son of Kombanaayil John, a respected criminal lawyer in the area, he prefers the company of his underprivileged friends Panchikuttan, Vicky Peedika, and Teny Sebastian. Lallu, although uneducated, has a lot of charm. He is adamant that he will marry for love and is looking to find a 'spark' in a girl. Hence, he has not found any girl to settle down with though Jesna is attracted to him and wishes that he marries her. However, Philip alias Paappi, his younger brother, a well-to-do computer engineer, wants to marry his girlfriend, whose parents insist that Lallu be married first. After trying and failing to find a girl that has the 'spark' he is looking for, Lallu sees a picture of a young woman, Diya, in the newspaper, who has gone missing, and suddenly feels the 'spark'. He and his friends try to find Diya, and learns about her kind nature in the process, yet cannot find her. However, one day Jesna meets Lallu and invites him to her wedding which was fixed by her parents. She clarifies that she is willing to wait until he gets that "spark" but her parents are unable to do so.

Lallu pieces together clues he gets from an accident which Diya met with and in the meantime learns that she is dead. He learns from SI Abhilash Karikkan that she was actually deliberately murdered by his nephew, Davis, an intoxicated gangster and criminal with psychological problems from childhood when someone mentions his mother and in anger he attacks them. Lallu takes his revenge by brutally hitting Davis and his friends, thereby avenging Diya's death. With the help of his father, he makes them stand before the legal system, ensuring Diya gets justice in the end. The film ends by showing that although Lallu believes he has never met Diya, he has on several occasions. When a small girl asks his full name, Lallu reveals that his name is Mohanlal John Kombanaayil and then she mentions that he looks like actor Mammootty.

== Cast ==
- Dulquer Salman as Mohanlal John Kombanaayil aka Lallu
  - Navaneeth Saju as Teenage Lallu
- Nikhila Vimal as Diya Francis
- Samyuktha as Jesna Johny
- Salim Kumar as Paanchikuttan
- Soubin Shahir as Vicky Paedika
  - Govind Motte as Younger Vicky
- Vishnu Unnikrishnan as Teni Sebastian
  - Karthik Vishnu as Teenage Teni
    - Master Adish as Young Teni
- Bibin George as Davis Karikkan, The main antagonist
- Renji Panicker as Adv. John Ouseph Kombanaayil, Lallu's and Paappi's father
- Arun Kurian as Philip John Kombanaayil aka Paappi
- Viji Ratheesh as Nancy, Lallu's and Paappi's mother
- Dharmajan Bolgatty as Tinku
- Hareesh Kanaran as Francis
- Dileesh Pothan as SI Abhilash Karikkan, Davis's uncle
- Suraj Venjaramoodu as Francis, Diya's father
- Lena as Annamma Francis, Diya's mother
- Baiju Santhosh as SI Pavan Kalyan
- Rajendran as Inspector Kamal Hassan
- Sunil Sukhada as Fr. Stephen Nettooran
- Ashokan as Kushumban Koshy, Jesna's father
- Pradeep Kottayam as Sebastian, Tony's father
- Resmi Anil as Tony's mother
- Chembil Ashokan as Antony, Vicky's father
- Seema G. Nair as Vicky's mother
- Molly Kannamally as Vaavathathi
- Madhu as Kombanaayil Ouseph Tharakan Lallu's and Paappi's grandfather (cameo appearance)
- Janardhanan as Karikkin Philipose, Davis's Grandfather (cameo appearance)
- Akshara Kishor as Sandra (Kunjumani)
- Ponnamma Babu as College Principal
- Reshmi Boban as Dr. Susan
- Manju Vijeesh as Deepa
- Kalabhavan Prajod as Anil, Police Constable
- Rajesh Paravoor as Thommi, Police Constable
- Blessy Kurien as College Student
- Cochin Mimi as John's Cousin
- Remya Panicker as College Student
- Sivakami as Diya's friend
- Hariprashanth M G as Paramada Abba

== Music ==
The music for Oru Yamandan Premakadha was composed by Nadirshah.

No.	Title	Singer(s)	Length
1.	"Vadhipin Malore"	Vidhadharan Master
2.	"Mutthathe Kombile"	Jassie Gift, Benny Dayal, Suraaj S Vasudev
3.	"Kanno Nilakayal"	Najim Arshad	3:43
4.	"Kothiyoorum Balyam"	Vineeth Sreenivasan

== Release ==
The film was released on 25 April 2019.

=== Reception ===
The film received mixed reviews and was an average grosser at the box office. Deepa Soman of The Times of India rated the movie 3 out of 5 stating: "The premise in itself might not be new, but the makers have managed to keep it quite entertaining." Deepa also praised Dulquer Salmaan's performance and wrote that it "is an out-and-out DQ show." Sify rated it 3 out of 5 stars and gave the verdict: "A suave Dulquer Salmaan saves the film." The reviewer concluded that "Oru Yamandan Premakadha is one of those films which is meant to be enjoyed without thinking too much." Cris of The News Minute gave the film a 2 out of 5 rating and wrote: "Dulquer's mass entertainer has a poor storyline." Navamy Sudhish of The Hindu said that it was "a bland treat with feel-good factors." Anna M. M. Vetticad of Firstpost rated the movie 1.5 out of 5 and concluded: "DQ looks good in lungis and is charming of course, but even his charm cannot hold up nearly three hours of exhausting wanderings." Manoj Kumar R. of The Indian Express rated it 1.5 out of 5 stars and said that "Dulquer Salmaan cannot charm his way out of this mess."
