= Swarna Kaduva =

- Theatrical release poster
- Directed by: Jose Thomas
- Written by: Babu Janardhanan
- Produced by: Job G. Oommen
- Starring: Biju Menon; Innocent Vareed; Poojitha Menon; Iniya; Suresh Krishna; Hareesh Perumanna
- Cinematography: Manoj Pillai
- Edited by: Johnkutty
- Music by: Ratheesh Vegha
- Production company: Job G. Films
- Distributed by: Jo & Jo
- Release date: 4 November 2016
- Running time: 147 minutes
- Country: India
- Language: Malayalam

Swarna Kaduva (transl. The golden tiger) is a 2016 Indian Malayalam-language satirical film directed by Jose Thomas, starring Biju Menon. The script is written by Babu Janardhanan. The film was released on 4 November 2016.

== Synopsis ==
Rinichen is a self made right-hand man of businessman Lonappan. Over the years he takes advantage of Lonappan for solving shady problems. When everything seems to boilover at the gravy train he uses the opportunity and asks Lonappan to help him settle elsewhere with a jewellery shop. Rinichen who had a hard life and was from once well known family starts care evermore for money & status and life starts to make him pay for karmic debts of his unethical previous engagements. The rest of the film explores whether Rinichen will rebound or go further down the rabbit hole.

== Cast ==
- Biju Menon as Rini Iype Matummel
- Iniya as Lovely
- Innocent as Lonappan
- Suresh Krishna as Irumbu Divakaran
- Sudheer Karamana as Advocate Paul
- Baiju Santhosh as Inspector Sasidharan
- Hareesh Perumanna as Joju
- Poojitha Menon as Deepthi
- Kottayam Nazeer
- Naseer Sankranthi as Thomas, Broker
- Santhosh Keezhattoor as CP Surendran
- Kishor Satya as Johnnychan
- Kalabhavan Jinto as Binoy
- Jayakumar Parameswaran Pillai as Father Antony
- Jayasankar Karimuttam
- Minon as Tamil boy
- Anju Aravind as Geethu Nair
- Seema G. Nair as Binoy's mother
- Sobha Singh as Rini's mother
- Chinnu Kuruvila as Anitha
- Rosin Jolly as Mollykutty
- Saju Kodiyan as Stephen, Mollykutty's brother
- Swasika Vijay as Riya
- Shanker Ramakrishnan as Narrottor(Voice only)

== Production ==
The film was initially titled Vella Kaduva. The film Swarna Kaduva was distributed overseas by Josemon Simon.

== Release ==
The film was earlier scheduled for a release on 28 October 2016, but to avoid competing with Pulimurugan, it was rescheduled to 4 November 2016. The film released in 104 screens in Kerala.

== Box office ==
In Kerala, the film collected ₹2.10 crore on its opening day. The film collected ₹1.6 crores in the first weekend and ₹2.34 crores in the three weekend from US box office.
