= Shikkari Shambhu =

- Theatrical release poster
- Directed by: Sugeeth
- Written by: Nishad Koya
- Produced by: S. K. Lawrence
- Starring: Kunchacko Boban; Sshivada; Vishnu Unnikrishnan; Hareesh Kanaran; Johny Antony
- Cinematography: Faisal Ali
- Edited by: V. Saajan
- Music by: Sreejith Edavana
- Production company: Angel Maria Cinemas
- Distributed by: Angel Maria Cinemas
- Release date: 20 January 2018 (India)
- Running time: 146 minutes
- Country: India
- Language: Malayalam
- Box office: 23 crore

Shikkari Shambhu is a 2018 Indian Malayalam-language action-comedy thriller film directed by Sugeeth and written by Nishad Koya. The film features Kunchacko Boban, Sshivada, Vishnu Unnikrishnan, Hareesh Kanaran, Aji John and Johny Antony in lead roles. Produced and distributed by S. K. Lawrence through Angel Maria Cinemas.

== Plot ==
The story revolves around three small-time fraudsters, Peelipose aka Peeli, Achu and Shaji. They overhear a conversation between a priest and his assistant and learn about a tiger unleashing terror in a village called Kurudimalakaavu and the region's panchayat member looking for a hunter.

Peeli and his friends were already in trouble where they were and sensing an opportunity, move to the village as hunters, eyeing the Rs 5 lakh reward as also the rare panchaloha idol in a temple. They become the darling of the villagers when they succeed in capturing the beast, though by a fortunate turn of events. Instead of bagging the cash prize, they request that they are allowed to stay in the village, obviously to pocket the idol that would make them rich. But there is another twist to the tale or is it better described as a tail? The unfolding events take the story forward.

== Cast ==
- Kunchacko Boban as Peelipose (Peeli)
- Sshivada as Anitha
- Vishnu Unnikrishnan as Achu
- Hareesh Kanaran as Shaji
- Aji John as Victor
- Johny Antony as Priest Babu
- Alphy Panjikaran as Revathi
- Krishna Kumar as Retd. Forest Ranger Vasu
- Maniyanpilla Raju as Sahadevan
- Sadiq as Jumbo
- Salim Kumar as SI Jimmi Micheal
- Jaise Jose as Satheesh
- Spadikam George as Mathews
- R. K. Suresh as Anitha's Father
- Maya Menon as Anitha's Mother
- Pauly Valsan as Anitha's Mother-in-Law
- Dharmajan Bolgatty

== Soundtrack ==
The film's music is by Sreejith Edayana.

1. "Mazha"- Haricharan, Roshini Suresh
2. "Kaana Chembaka Poo" - Vijay Yesudas
3. "Tharam" - Deepak
4. "Tharaarathara Moolana" - Vineeth Sreenivasan, Sreejith Edayana
5. "Puliyunde Nariyunde" - Renjith Unni, Sreejith Edayana, Ramshi Ahamed

== Release ==
The film was released on 20 January 2018 over 100 theaters in Kerala.

== Critical response ==
Filmibeat rated the film 3.5 out of 5 stars saying that "If you are a fan of template-based entertainers, which will keep you entertained throughout with the right proportions of comedy, action, thrill, and suspense, then Shikkari Shambhu will definitely satisfy you completely". Sify.com reviewed the film to be "one time watch". While the comic sequences in the film were widely appreciated, while rated the film 3 out of 5 stars. Cinema Express, in its review, wrote "Shikkari Shambu is definitely a watchable film, the film has an unpredictable climax twist, one that comes as a real surprise."
