= Koodal (film) =

2025 Indian Malayalam film

- Theatrical Release Poster
- Directed by: Shaanu Kakkoor; Shafi Eppikkad
- Written by: Shafi Eppikkad
- Produced by: Jithin KV
- Starring: Bibin George; Mareena Michael Kurisingal
- Cinematography: Shajeer Pappa
- Edited by: Jarshaj Kommeri
- Music by: Sibu Sukumaran
- Production companies: P&J Productions Pvt Ltd
- Distributed by: P&J Productions Pvt Ltd
- Release date: 27 June 2025
- Running time: 108 minutes
- Country: India
- Language: Malayalam

Koodal is a 2025 Indian Malayalam-language thriller film directed by Shaanu Kakkoor and Shafi Eppikkad and written by Shafi Eppikkad. The film features Bibin George and Mareena Michael Kurisingal.

== Plot ==
Two young women find themselves at a secluded "Strangers Camp" where they come face-to-face with the killer of their former classmate. As tensions escalate, the camp director, Bobby, attempts to protect them, leading to a series of unexpected and chilling developments.

== Cast ==
- Bibin George as Boby
- Mareena Michael Kurisingal as Hima
- Vineeth Thattil David as Achayan
- Niya Varghese- Laila
- Riya Isha as Anju
- Anu Sonara as Nimmy
- Vijilesh as Sumesh
- Vijaya Krishnan as CM
- Rafi DQ as Kannan P
- Lali PM as Indira
- Kevin Paul as Mentalist Adarsh
- Gajaraj as Inspector Sankar
- Samjeevan as Sreedharamenon
- Ali Arangadath as Samuel
