= Perumanna, Kozhikode =

Perumanna പെരുമണ്ണ
- Census Town
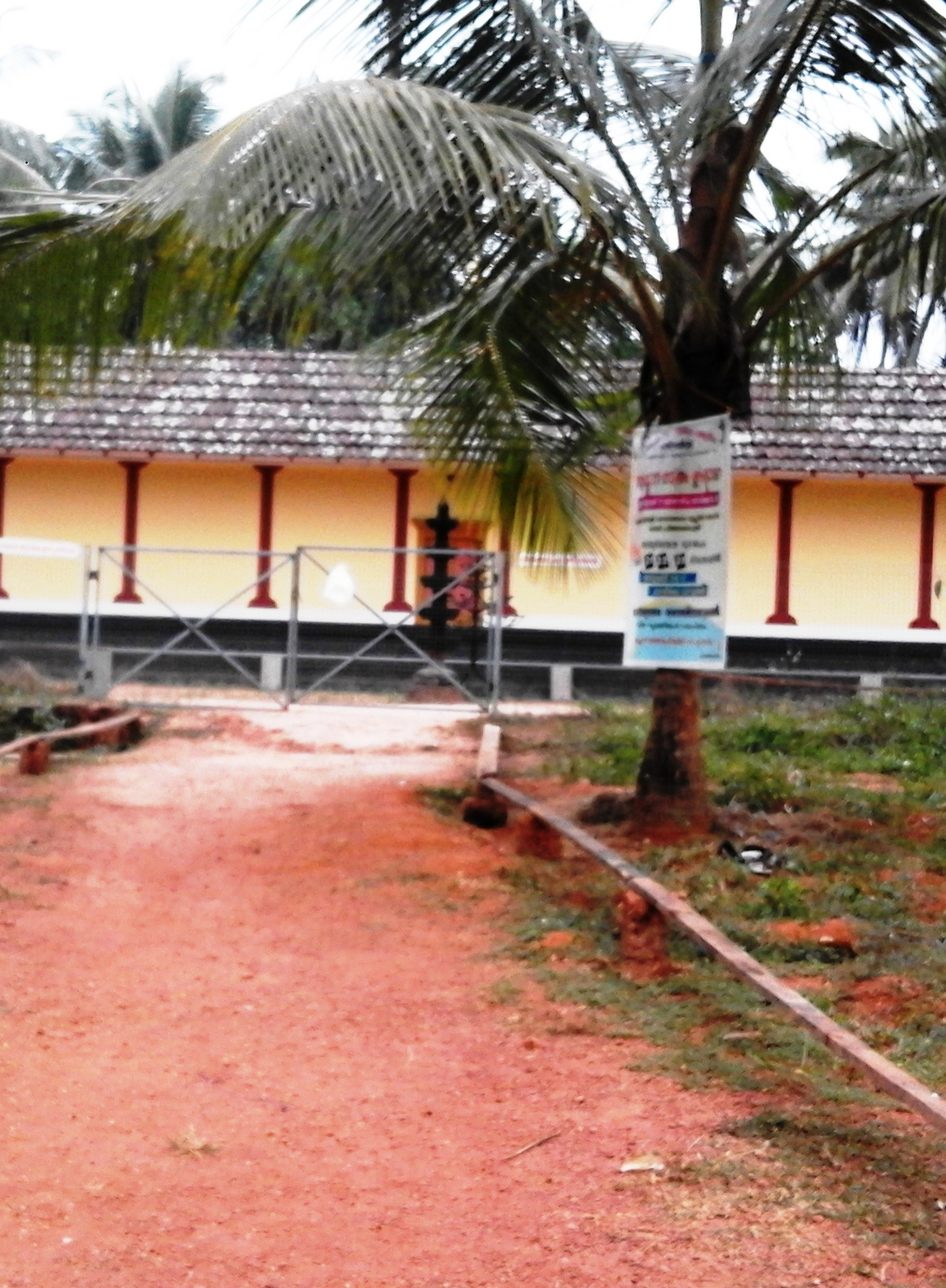
- Puthiyedath Krishna Temple, Perumanna

- Location in Kerala, India Perumanna (India)
- Coordinates: 11°14′20″N 75°52′45″E
- Country: India
- State: Kerala
- District: Kozhikode

Government
  - Type: Local Self Government
  - Body: Perumanna Grama Panchayat
  - President: Shaji Puthalath

Population (2011)
  - Total: 35,460

Languages
  - Official: Malayalam, English
- Time zone: UTC+5:30 (IST)
- PIN: 673019
- Vehicle registration: KL-11, KL-85

Perumanna is a census town in the Kozhikode district in the state of Kerala, India. It belongs to the north Kerala division and is located 13 km from Kozhikode city.

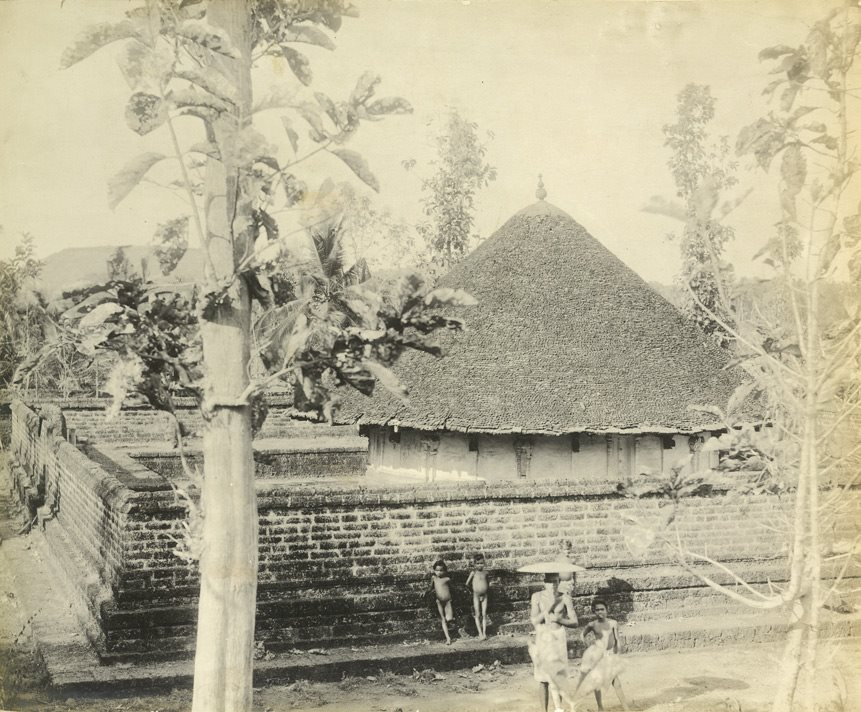
The Vishnu Temple at Perumanna in the early 20th century

== Demographics ==
Perumanna panchayat population
Year	Pop.	±%
2001	28,027	—
2011	35,460	+26.5%
Source: Census of India

As of 2011 India census, Perumanna had a population of 35,460, with 17,479 males and 17,981 females.

== Notable people ==
- Hareesh Kanaran, actor
- T Siddique, politician
