= Dharmajan Bolgatty =

Indian actor, writer, producer, comedian and politician

- Born: 1976 (age 49–50); Mulavukad, Kerala, India
- Occupations: Actor; politician; film producer; comedian; entrepreneur
- Years active: 2003–present
- Political party: Indian National Congress
- Spouse: Anuja
- Children: 2
- Parents: Kumaran; Madhavi

Dharmajan Bolgatty (born 1976) is an Indian actor, producer, comedian, politician and entrepreneur, who works in Malayalam films, television, and stage shows. He began his career as a comedian appearing in sketch comedies on stage, later forayed into such comedic television shows and into films in 2010s. Dharmajan entered active politics in 2021, ahead of the assembly elections in Kerala. He is a member of Indian National Congress and was the United Democratic Front candidate in Balusseri constituency.

== Career ==
He appeared in several TV shows and received his breakthrough through the success of the TV comedy show Bluff Master on Asianet Plus, hosted along with his friend Ramesh Pisharody. Later they became a popular comedy duo. Both of them together have wrote script for the comedy show Cinemala. The duo is also known for the Malayalam TV show Badai Bungalow. He started his Malayalam cinema career with the film Paappi Appacha (2010). He played the role of Dileep's driver sidekick. He is mainly seen in comedy roles.

After his full length role in Paappi Appacha, his roles in Kattappanayile Rithwik Roshan, Aadu and Aadu 2 established him as a comedy actor in the Malayalam film industry. He is also announced to become a playback singer. He is also a businessman and has established fish stores himself. He is also a film producer and produced a film named Nithyaharitha Nayakan in 2018.

== Politics ==
Dharmajan is a member of Indian National Congress. He was active in student politics and was a member of Kerala Students Union, the student wing of Congress. He ended his active presence in politics when he became busy in the field of art. He entered active politics again in 2021, ahead of the assembly elections in Kerala. In the 2021 assembly election, he represented the United Democratic Front in Balusseri constituency. He failed to the LDF candidate, Sachin Dev for 20000 plus votes.

== Early and personal life ==
He was born to Kumaran and Madhavi in the city of Kochi, Kerala. He completed his primary education at Mulavukad High School and later joined St. Albert's College. He is married to Anuja and has two daughters, Veda and Vyga.

== Filmography ==
=== Films ===
Year	Title	Role	Notes
2010	Paappi Appacha	Kuttappi	Debut film
2011	Pachuvum Kovalanum		
2012	Ordinary	Antappan	
2012	Naughty Professor		
2012	My Boss	Hotel waiter	
2012	Puthiya Theerangal		
2012	Chapters		
2013	Ithu Manthramo Thanthramo Kuthanthramo		
2013	Isaac Newton S/O Philipose		
2013	Sound Thoma	Coconut Climber Kittunni	
2013	Arikil Oral		
2014	Vasanthathinte Kanal Vazhikalil		
2014	Onnum Mindaathe		
2014	Kurutham Kettavan		
2014	Villali Veeran	Biju Brahmanan	
2014	Nagara Varidhi Naduvil Njan		
2015	Aadu-Oru Bheegara Jeevi Aanu	Captain Cleetus	
2015	Jilebi	Tony	
2015	High Alert		
2015	Life of Josutty		
2015	Amar Akbar Anthony	Patient	
2015	Punchirikku Parasparam		Short Film
2016	Kattumakkan		
2016	Pachakkallam		
2016	Kolamasss		
2016	Darvinte Parinamam	Local Guy	
2016	Dhanayathra	Servant	
2016	Angana Thanne Nethave Anjettennam Pinnale		
2016	Aneesya		
2016	Ann Maria Kalippilaanu	Saabu	
2016	Pretham	Yeshu	
2016	Welcome to Central Jail	Sugunan	
2016	Kattappanayile Rithwik Roshan	Dasappan	
2017	Achayans	Sudharman	
2017	Godha	Danger	
2017	Chicken Kokkachi		
2017	Chunkzz	Athmaram K.T./ Athmavu	
2017	Cappuccino	Jango	
2017	Aana Alaralodalaral	Inzamam Imran Khan	
2017	Punyalan Private Limited	Advocate Peer Thanish	
2017	Aadu 2	Captain "Sachin" Clematis	
2018	Kuttanadan Marpappa	Motta	
2018	Vikadakumaran	Binu Sebastian	
2018	Shikkari Shambhu		
2018	Laughing Apartment Near Girinagar		
2018	Nithyaharitha Nayakan	Binuraj	Also producer
2018	An International Local Story	-	
2018	Panchavarnathatha	-	
2019	Irupathiyonnaam Noottaandu	Godwin	
2019	Sakalakalashala		Also singer
2019	Oru Yamandan Premakadha	Tinku	
2019	Brother's Day	Munna	
2019	Pattabhiraman	Sunimon	
2019	Margamkali	Bilal	
2019	Ittymaani: Made in China	Sainu	
2019	Ganagandharvan	Santhosh	
2020	Dhamaka	Shiva	
2020	Trance	Soji	
2020	Al Mallu		
2021	Krishnankutty Pani Thudangi		Cameo
2021	Erida	Servant	Bilingual film
2021	No Way Out		
2021	Vidhi: The Verdict	Maniyan	
2022	Thirimali		
2023	Corona Dhavan	Sabumon	
2024	Palayam PC		
2024	Pavi Caretaker	Ratheesh	
2024	Virunnu	Murali	
2024	Porattu Nadakam	Murugan	
2025	A Pan Indian Story		
2025	Ambalamukkile Visheshangal		
2026	Aadu 3	Sachin Cleetus	

=== Television ===
Year	Program	Role	Channel	Notes
2003-2009	Cinemala	Various roles	Asianet	
2004	Ettu Sundarikalum Njanum	Script writer	Surya TV	
2004-2009	Bluffmasters	Co-host	Asianet Plus	
2006	5 star Thattukada	Thattukadakkaran	Asianet Plus	
2008	Enganeyundashane		Jaihind TV	
2013-2016	Badai Bungalow	Various roles	Asianet	
2015	Cinema chirima	Himself	Mazhavil Manorama	
2016	Flowers TV Awards 2016	Co-host	Flowers	
2017	Comedy Super Nights	Various roles	Flowers	
2018	Panchavadippalam		Flowers	
2020	Bigg Boss (Malayalam season 2)	Guest	Asianet	Episode 7
2020-2021	Start Music Season 2	Co-Host	Asianet	
2020-2021	Star Magic	Mentor	Flowers	

== Awards and nominations ==
Nominations

- Nomination, Asianet Film Awards for Best Supporting Actor (Kattappanayile Rithwik Roshan)
- Nomination, 6th South Indian International Movie Awards for Best Comedian Malayalam (Kattappanayile Rithwik Roshan)
- Nomination, 8th South Indian International Movie Awards for Best Comedian Malayalam (Kuttanadan Marpappa)
- Nomination, 2nd IIFA Ultsalvam for performance in a comic role Malayalam (Kattappanayile Rithwik Roshan)
- Nomination, 2nd IIFA Ultsalvam for performance in a comic role Malayalam (Kattappanayile Rithwik Roshan)
- Nomination, 10th South Indian International Movie Awards for Best Comedian Malayalam (Dhamaka)

Won

- Won, Flowers Gulf Film Awards - Best comedy actor (Kattappanayile Rithwik Roshan)
- Won, Vanitha Film Awards 2017 for Best Comedian (Kattappanayile Rithwik Roshan)
- Won, Versatile Performer (TV) - Asianet Comedy Awards (Badai Bungalow)
- Won, Asianet Film Awards 2018 - Best comedian (Various films)
- Won, 3rd Anand TV film awards - Best Comedian (various films)
