= Spa (2026 film) =

Indian comedy drama film

- Theatrical release poster
- Directed by: Abrid Shine
- Written by: Abrid Shine
- Produced by: Sanchoo J. Sajimon Parayil
- Starring: Shruthy Menon; Vineeth Thattil David; Radhika Radhakrishnan; Sidharth Bharathan; Sreeja Das
- Cinematography: Swaroop Philip
- Edited by: Manoj
- Music by: Ishaan Chhabra
- Production company: Holly Dreams Productions
- Release date: 13 February 2026
- Running time: 118 minutes
- Country: India
- Language: Malayalam

Spa is a 2026 Indian Malayalam-language comedy-drama film written and directed by Abrid Shine. Set in an urban massage therapy centre, the film is a social satire that examines male desire, entitlement and social hypocrisy through the interactions between the establishment's therapists and their clients. It stars Shruthy Menon, Vineeth Thattil David, Radhika Radhakrishnan, Sidharth Bharathan and Sreeja Das, among an ensemble cast.

== Premise ==
The film follows the intertwined lives of people connected to an urban massage therapy centre. It centres on Mathan, played by Vineeth Thattil David, and unfolds as an episodic satire on the attitudes of the men who visit the establishment and the double standards surrounding it.

== Cast ==
- Shruthy Menon as Sara/Jennifer, the Massage Killer
- Radhika Radhakrishnan as Riya
- Poojitha Menon as Sweety
- Sreeja Das as Betty
- Rima Dutta as Tanya
- Shreelakshmi Bhat as Jasmine
- Vineeth Thattil David as Mathan
- Sidharth Bharathan as Gabriel Jibri
- Prasanth Alexander as Rakesh
- Vijay Menon as Artist
- Major Ravi as Pereira
- Joji K John as Johnson
- Dinesh Prabhakar as Sugunan
- Ashwin Kkumar as Killer Tony
- Rahul Madhav as Actor
- Srikanth Murali as Dr. Harshanandan
- Kichu Tellus as Vinod
- Sajimon Parayil as nature lover customer
- Megha Thomas as Sofi Rakesh
- Neena Kurup as Catherine Pereira
- Abi Suhana as Monica Magnus
- Febi as Sini
- Samad Sulaiman as Martin
- Abhilash As Jose
- Rajshri Deshpande as Lisa, the Bikini Killer (cameo)

== Production ==
Spa was written and directed by Abrid Shine, whose earlier films include 1983 and Action Hero Biju. Shine has said that the story was not originally conceived around a spa setting; the idea developed from his interest in depicting a space where men and women interact without social masks. The film was produced by Sanchoo J. and Sajimon Parayil under the banner Holly Dreams Productions, with music by Ishaan Chhabra and cinematography by Swaroop Philip.

== Release ==
Spa was released in theatres in February 2026. It began streaming on Manorama Max from 30 May 2026.

== Critical reception ==
Spa received generally positive reviews from critics, who praised its willingness to explore an unconventional subject while noting weaknesses in its later portions.

Reviewing the film for The New Indian Express, the critic described it as a daring and engaging experiment that falters in its final stretch. Writing for OnManorama, Princy Alexander observed that the film is provocative in idea but unexpectedly playful in execution, and that it uses its setting less as a site of titillation and more as a lens to examine male desire, entitlement and fantasy. The review also noted that the film's release coincided with heightened public and police scrutiny of massage parlours in Kerala.
