= Hariprashanth M. G. =

Indian Malayalam actor

- Born: 6 May 1976 (age 50)
- Occupation: Film actor
- Years active: 2014–present

Hariprashanth M. G. is an Indian actor who has appeared in many Malayalam films. He is known for his performances in Aadu 2, Malaikottai Vaaliban, and Kantara: Chapter 1.

== Acting career ==
Hariprashanth made his acting debut in the 2014 Malayalam film Unni Mukundan starrer The Last Supper after a friend invited him to play a small role. Then, in 2017, another friend forwarded details of a casting call by Friday Film House and landed the role of Chekuthan Lasser in Aadu 2.

In 2025, Hariprashanth made his entry into Kannada cinema with Kantara: Chapter 1, a blockbuster film directed by Rishab Shetty.

== Filmography ==
Key
†	Denotes films that have not yet been released

Year	Title	Role	Notes
2015	Fireman	Prisoner	Debut film
2017	Aadu 2	Chekuthan' Lassar	
2018	Parole	Sudarshan	
2018	Janaadhipan	Maariyamma (Maari)	
2019	An International Local Story		
2019	Oru Yamandan Premakadha	Paramada Abba	
2019	Thrissur Pooram	Edakkadan John	
2019	Margamkali	Paramada Abba	
2021	Churuli	Kudakan	
2023	Antony	Tarzan	
2024	Malaikottai Vaaliban	Kelu Mallan	
2025	Kantara: Chapter 1	Vijayendra	Kannada film
