= Puthiya Theerangal =

- Film poster
- Directed by: Sathyan Anthikad
- Written by: Benny P. Nayarambalam
- Produced by: Neeta Anto
- Starring: Nivin Pauly; Namitha Pramod; Nedumudi Venu
- Cinematography: Venu
- Edited by: K. Rajagopal
- Music by: Ilaiyaraaja
- Production company: Ann Mega Media
- Distributed by: Ann Mega Media
- Release date: 27 September 2012
- Running time: 126 minutes
- Country: India
- Language: Malayalam

Puthiya Theerangal (transl. The New Shores) is a 2012 Indian Malayalam-language film directed by Sathyan Anthikad, produced by Neeta Anto, and written by Benny P. Nayarambalam. It stars Nivin Pauly, Namitha Pramod, and Nedumudi Venu. The music was composed by Ilaiyaraaja.

== Plot ==
The film is set at the seaside and focuses on the life of a young girl named Thamara who lives on her own at the shore after the death of her parents. Sometime later, she finds an old man and feels that she got her father back. The story dwells on the bond between the two and how that changes in the presence of the few new people who start to live on the sea shore.

== Cast ==
- Nivin Pauly as Mohanan Maash
- Namitha Pramod as Thamara
  - Amritha Anil as Young Thamara
- Nedumudi Venu as Advocate Immanuel (Original Name)/Kurian Paulose/Kumara Panickker (K.P.)
- Malavika Nair as Minikkutty (Adv. Immanuels Daughter)
- Innocent as Father Michael
- Sidhartha Siva as Appachan
- Mahima as Appachan's wife
- Siddique as Sankaran, Thamars's father (extended cameo)
- S.P.Sreekumar as Manikandadaasan
- Krishnabhaskar Mangalasserri
- Molly Aunty
- Dharmajan Bolgatty as Srank Velayudan

== Production ==
Puthiya Theerangal is produced by Anto Joseph under the banner of Aan Mega Media and scripted by Benny P. Nayarambalam. Audiography was done by M. R. Rajakrishnan.

== Soundtrack ==
Puthiya Theerangal

Soundtrack album by Ilaiyaraaja
- Released: 9 September 2012
- Recorded: 2012
- Genre: Film soundtrack
- Length: 12:50
- Language: Malayalam
- Label: Mathrubhumi Music
- Producer: Ilaiyaraaja

Ilaiyaraaja chronology
Prasad (2012)	Puthiya Theerangal (2012)	Mayilu (2012)

The soundtrack was composed by Ilaiyaraaja with lyrics penned by Kaithapram. The album consists of three songs. The audio rights were acquired by Mathrubhumi Music. The album was launched on 9 September 2012 at Kochi. The soundtrack received generally positive reviews from music critics. "Rajagopuram" song was widely appreciated and the pick of the album.

Track list
No.	Title	Lyrics	Singer(s)	Length
1.	"Rajagopuram"	Kaithapram	Vijay Yesudas, Shweta Mohan	4:05
2.	"Sindoora Pottu"	Kaithapram	Madhu Balakrishnan	4:25
3.	"Marippeelikkatte"	Kaithapram	Madhu Balakrishnan	4:20
Total length:				12:50

== Reception ==
Puthiya Theerangal received mixed reviews upon release with most critics complaining that it is a typical Sathyan Anthikad film with nothing new to offer. Sify.com gives the verdict "Disappointing" and says, "Puthiya Theerangal has nothing new about it and ends up as a meek affair. With clichéd situations and half-baked characters, the film is a lazy effort from one of Kerala's most popular directors ever." Paresh C Palicha of Rediff.com says Puthiya Theerangal has some good performances but in the end it leaves us with mixed feelings. He rated the film. Oneindia.in was somewhat impressed with the film. In a review which rates the film, its critic comments that the film "spells the same 'Sathyan Anthikkad' magic". it.flopped

== Accolades ==
Ceremony	Category	Nominee	Result
2nd South Indian International Movie Awards	Best Lyricist	Kaithapram for "Rajagopuram"	Nominated
2nd South Indian International Movie Awards	Best Female Debutant	Namitha Pramod	Nominated
