= Johnkutty =

Indian film editor

- Education: Kerala University
- Occupation: Film editor

Johnkutty is an Indian film editor working in Malayalam film industry. He began his career editing television shows in 2000, debuting with Munshi in Asianet. He joined in the Kerala State Film Development Corporation in 2001 as a non-linear editor. After working as an assist in a number of Malayalam films, he debuted as an independent editor in 2012 with the film Mayamohini.

== Career ==
He started his career editing in 2000 by Munshi in Asianet. In the following year, he joined in the Kerala State Film Development Corporation as a non-linear editor. Later he edited a number of Malayalam television serials, notable of it includes Sumangali and Jagapoga. He has also edited few documentary films for Kerala Public Relations Department. He edited 13 episodes of Tenali Raman produced by Toons Animation for the American channel Cartoon Network.

After three years, he joined in Chitranjali Studio, Thiruvananthapuram. During that period he got an opportunity to work as associate editor. Since then he joined in a devotional channel in the editorial section as head of the department (HOD) and worked for some of the films. After three years, he began to work in films as Spot Editor as well as associate editor. Prior to that and during this period he worked as an assistant editor in the films Achuvinte Amma, Makalkku, Photographer, Ore Kadal, Rithu, Madampi, Pokkiri Raja, Kaaryasthan, Seniors, Traffic. His first film as an independent editor was Mayamohini in 2012. He also worked on the film Vaathil.

== Filmography ==
Year	Title	Notes
2012	Mayamohini	
2012	Bhoomiyude Avakashikal	
2013	Maad Dad	
2013	Sringaravelan	
2013	Memories	
2013	Progress Report	
2013	Ms Lekha Tharoor Kaanunnathu	
2014	7th Day	
2014	To Noora with Love	
2014	Seconds	
2014	Ormayundo Ee Mukham	
2014	Mylanchi Monchulla Veedu	
2015	Ivan Maryadaraman	
2015	Amar Akbar Anthony	
2016	Paavada	
2016	Welcome to Central Jail	
2016	Swarna Kaduva	
2016	Pulimurugan	
2016	Kattappanayile Rithwik Roshan	
2017	Hello Dubaikkaran	
2017	Masterpiece	
2017	Lavakusha	
2018	Autorsha	
2018	Ira	
2018	Odiyan	
2018	Aanakkallan	
2019	Oru Yamandan Premakadha	
2019	Mera Naam Shaji	
2019	Margamkali	
2019	Jack & Daniel	
2022	Antakshari	
2022	Jaya Jaya Jaya Jaya Hey	
2023	Vaathil	
2023	Vedikettu	
2024	Guruvayoor Ambalanadayil	
2024	DNA	
2024	Chithini	
2025	Vyasanasametham Bandhumithradhikal	
2025	Cherukkanum Pennum	
2026	Magic Mushrooms	
2026	Juniors Journey	
2026	Ottam Thullal †	

== Awards ==
Year	Award	Film
2017	19th Asianet Film Award	Pulimurugan
