= Margamkali (film) =

2019 film by Sreejith Vijayan

- Promotional poster
- Directed by: Sreejith Vijayan
- Written by: Shashankan Mayyanad
- Produced by: Listin Stephen; Alvin Antony
- Starring: Bibin George; Namitha Pramod; Gouri G. Kishan; Shanthi Krishna; Siddique; Hareesh Kanaran
- Narrated by: Dulquer Salmaan
- Cinematography: Aravind Krishna
- Edited by: Johnkutty
- Music by: Gopi Sundar
- Production companies: Ananya Films; Magic Frames
- Release date: 2 August 2019
- Running time: 142 minutes
- Country: India
- Language: Malayalam

Margamkali is a 2019 Indian Malayalam-language romantic comedy film directed by Sreejith Vijayan and written by Shashankan Mayyanad. It is co-produced by Listin Stephen and Alwin Antony. The film stars Bibin George, Namitha Pramod, Gouri G. Kishan, Shanthi Krishna, Siddique and Hareesh Kanaran. The music is composed by Gopi Sunder.

The story of the film follows three friends, Sachi (played by Bibin George) an only son of an affluent family, Antappan, a drunkard, and the other a lassi shop owner who is desperate for love. Sachi, had a failed affair so has taken an oath not to love or marry. The film was released on 2 August 2019. This movie received mixed reviews and became a commercial failure in box office.

== Synopsis ==
Sachidanandan is the son of Ramanan Nair and Chandrika, a separated couple. His parents don't want him to work, as he is from an affluent family. After his break-up with Jessi, Sachi loses faith in love and marriage. Later, Sachi enters the life of Urmila, after she rejects the proposal of his best friend, "Tiktok" Unni. What happens next forms the crux of the story.

== Cast ==
- Bibin George as Sachidanandan a.k.a. Sachi
  - Al Sabith as young Sachidanandan
- Namitha Pramod as Urmila
  - Durga Premjith as young Urmila
- Gouri G. Kishan as Jessy
- Siddique as Ramanan Nair, Sachidanandan's Father
- Shanthi Krishna as Chandrika, Sachidanandan's mother
- Hareesh Kanaran as TikTok Unni, Sachidanandan's best friend
- Baiju Santhosh as Antappan, Jessy's Father
- Dharmajan Bolgatty as Bilal
- Renji Panicker as Urmila's Father
- Narayanan Kutty as Security guard Chellappan
- Anu Joseph as Seetha, Urmila's Sister
- Sowmya Menon as Urmila, Unni's love interest
- Bindu Panicker as Urmila's Mother
- Dinesh Nair as Ganeshan, Seetha's Husband
- Hariprashanth M G as a Goon, Sachidanandan friend
- Surabhi Santosh as Hima
- Manju Vani
- Lakshmi Priya as Poothiri Lilly
- Binu Thrikkakkara as Premdas
- Vishnu Unnikrishnan (Cameo)
- Dulquer Salmaan as Baby (Voice Cast)

== Marketing and release ==
A theatrical trailer of the film was released by Millennium Audios on 24 July 2019.

The film was wide released on 2 August 2019.

== Music ==
Margamkali

Soundtrack album by Gopi Sundar
- Genre: Film soundtrack
- Length: 11:08
- Language: Malayalam
- Label: Millennium Audios
- Producer: Listin Stephan and Alvin Antony

The soundtrack for Margamkali was composed by Gopi Sundar. Song released under Millennium Audios official label

Track listing
No.	Title	Lyrics	Singer(s)	Length
1.	"Ninakkayi Njan"	Abeenraj M A	Bibin George	4:15
2.	"Ennuyire"	Harinarayanan B.K	Akbar Khan, Sithara	3:44
3.	"Venda Venda (Shivane Anthom Kunthom)"	Harinarayanan B.K	Afsal	3:49
Total length:				11:08

== Reception ==
=== Critical reception ===
Anjana George of The Times of India rated the film 3/5 stars and wrote, "There is nothing remarkable to speak about the technicalities of the movie, which make for a timepass film but definitely offers nothing for intellectual stimulation."
