= Nithyaharitha Nayakan =

2018 Indian Malayalam language film

- Theatrical release poster
- Directed by: AR Binuraj
- Story by: Jayagopal
- Produced by: Dharmajan Bolgatty & Manu Thachettu
- Starring: Vishnu Unnikrishnan; Dharmajan Bolgatty; Anju Aravind; Jaffer Idukki; Indrans; Basil Joseph; Saju Navodaya; Sajan Palluruthy; Manju Pillai; Jayashree Sivadhas; Raveena Ravi
- Cinematography: Pavi K. Pavan
- Edited by: Noufal Abdullah
- Music by: Ranjin Raj
- Release date: 16 November 2018
- Country: India
- Language: Malayalam

Nithyaharitha Nayakan (transl. Evergreen Hero) is a 2018 Indian Malayalam-language comedy film produced by Dharmajan Bolgatty. The movie stars Vishnu Unnikrishnan, Manju Pillai, Indrans, Bijukuttan. Ranjin Raj scored the film. Pavi K Pavan was the cinematographer. This film was released on 16 November 2018.

The film received positive reviews and Critics Rating of 2.5/5 as reported by Times of India.

== Plot ==
Sajimon has many desires, but things go wrong for him. The film follows his romantic relationships. Sajimon tells stories of his relationships to his wife Haritha on his wedding night. Sajimon describes his romance with Nithya. His classmate Joby helps Sajimon to win her love. During his college days, Sajimon falls in love with Surumi. Vasu and Omana, who are the parents of Sajimon, provide comedy scenes.

== Cast ==
- Vishnu Unnikrishnan as Sajimon
- Dharmajan Bolgatty as Biju
- Akhila Nath as Haritha
- Anju Aravind
- Jaffar Idukki
- Indrans as Vasu
- Basil Joseph as Joby
- Abraham Koshy as Madhavan
- Saju Navodaya as Patti Simon
- Sunil Sukhada as Fa. Thomas
- Bijukuttan as Suresh
- Sajan Palluruthy as Karunan
- Manju Pillai as Omana
- Jayashree Sivadhas as Nithya
- Raveena Ravi as Treesa
- Sivakami Anantha Narayanan as Surumi
- Sruthy Jayan as Reshma
- Binu Thrikkakkara as Ratheesh

== Music ==
The film music were composed by Ranjin Raj.

Track listing
No.	Title	Singer(s)	Length
1.	"Iniyum"	Niranj Suresh, Hesham Abdul Wahab	02:51
2.	"Kanakamulla"	Mohammed Maqbool Mansoor, Jyotsna Radhakrishnan	04:07
3.	"Makara Maasa"	Dharmajan Bolgatty	02:10
4.	"Neelaravil"	M G Sreekumar, Sujatha Mohan	04:30
5.	"Paarijaatha Poo"	Vishnu Unnikrishnan	03:29
