= Magic Mushrooms (film) =

Indian Malayalam film

- Theatrical Release Poster
- Directed by: Nadirshah
- Written by: Akash Dev
- Produced by: Asharaf Pilakkal
- Starring: Vishnu Unnikrishnan; Akshaya Udayakumar; Meenakshi Dinesh
- Cinematography: Sujith Vaassudev ISC
- Edited by: Johnkutty
- Music by: Songs: Nadirshah; Score: Manikandan Ayyappa
- Production company: Manjadi Creations
- Distributed by: Bhavana Release
- Release date: 23 January 2026
- Country: India
- Language: Malayalam
- Budget: ₹5 crores
- Box office: ₹75 lakhs

Magic Mushrooms (also marketed as Magic Mushrooms from Kanjikkuzhi) is a 2026 Indian Malayalam film composed and directed by Nadirshah. The film stars Vishnu Unnikrishnan and Akshaya Udayakumar in lead role.

== Cast ==
- Vishnu Unnikrishnan as Ayon Jose (Kocherukkan)
  - Drupat Krishna as young Kocherukkan
- Akshaya Udayakumar as Janaki
- Meenakshi Dinesh as Jewel
  - Vaidehi A Nair as young Jewel
- Pooja Mohanraj as Anitha
- Aju Varghese as Ananthu (Cameo)
- Abin Bino as Paappi
  - Vaishnav as Young Paappi
- Shameer Khan as Pookala
- Althaf Salim as Akash Joseph
- Sidharth Bharathan as Madhu
- Harisree Ashokan as Shakespeare Gopalankutty, drama artist
- Johny Antony as E.M. Philip
- Jaffar Idukki as Jose, Ayon's father
- Bobby Kurian as Divakaran
- Pramod Veliyanad as SI Sajimon
- Ashraf Pilakkal as Monai
- Manisha KS as Vijayamma
- Alice as Ponnammachi
- Shanthivilla Dinesh as Shanthi
- Master Sufian as Janaki’s brother
- Athira as Kocherukkan’s mother
- Hilda as Bindu
- Joshi as Teacher

== Music ==
Magic Mushroom

Soundtrack album by Nadirshah
- Released: 12 December 2025 – 9 January 2026
- Genre: Filmi
- Label: 123Musix

The music is composed by Nadirshah and the lyrics are penned by B. K. Harinarayanan, Santhosh Varma, Rajeev Alungal, Rajeev Govindan and Yadhu Krishnan R.

=== Tracklisting ===
No.	Title	Lyrics	Singer(s)	Length
1.	"Thaloadi Marayuvathevide Nee"	B. K. Harinarayanan	Shreya Ghoshal, Hanan Shaah	4:19
2.	"Thithaaram Maarippenne"	Santhosh Varmma	Jassie Gift, Nadirshah, Ranjini Jose	3:50
3.	"Aaraane Aaraane"	Rajeev Govindan	K. S. Chithra, Rimi Tomy	3:56

== Production ==
The film title was announced on 9 June 2025 through the crew's official social media handles.

== Release ==
The film's launch was scheduled for 16 January 2026 but was postponed to 23 January 2026. The teaser was released on 24 December 2025. It was a box office disaster.
