= Namitha Pramod =

Indian actress

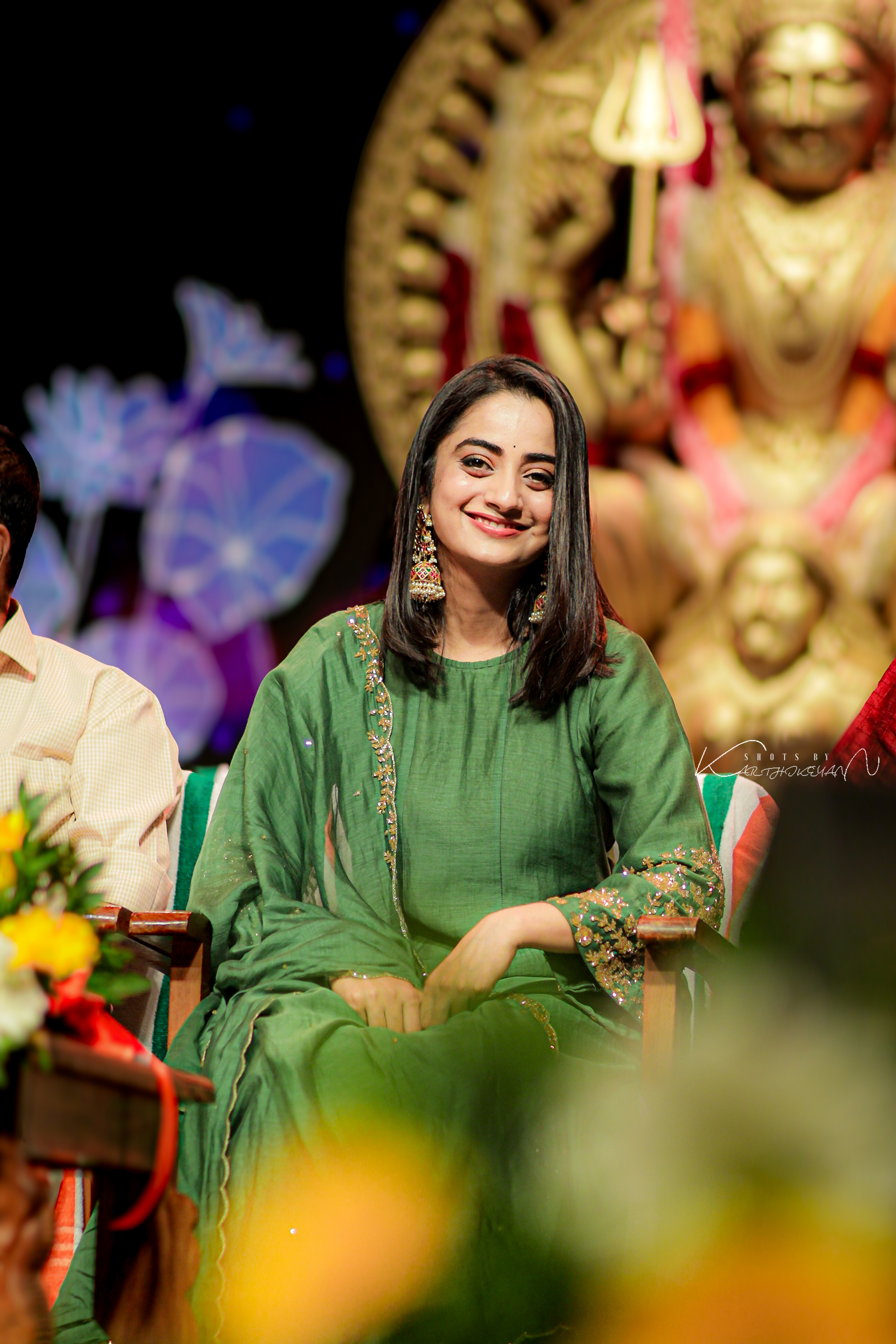
- Born: 19 September 1996 (age 30); Kottayam, Kerala, India
- Education: St. Teresa's College, Kochi
- Occupation: Actress
- Years active: 2011(child artist); 2012–present

Namitha Pramod (born 19 September 1996) is an Indian actress who appears mainly in Malayalam films. She made her acting debut as a child artist in the Malayalam film Traffic (2011) and appeared in her first lead role in Puthiya Theerangal, which was released in 2012.

She went on to appear in super hit films like Sound Thoma (2013), Pullipulikalum Aattinkuttiyum (2013), Vikramadithyan (2014), Villali Veeran (2014), Chandrettan Evideya (2015), Amar Akbar Anthony (2015), Adi Kapyare Kootamani (2015), Role Models (2017) and Al Mallu (2020).

== Early life and education ==
Namitha Pramod was born in Kottayam as the daughter of Pramod, a businessman and Indu, a housewife. She has a younger sister. She attended Carmel Girls Higher Secondary School in Thiruvananthapuram. She attended the St. Teresa's College, Kochi to pursue a Bachelor of Arts degree in sociology. She has stated that she was "not going to let [her] acting career compromise [her] studies".

== Career ==
Namitha started acting when she was in seventh standard by acting in Vellankanni Mathavu, Amme Devi, and Ente Manasa Puthri. She made her film debut as child artist in Rajesh Pillai's critically acclaimed Traffic In 2012, she played her first lead role in the film Puthiya Theerangal, opposite Nivin Pauly. It was followed by lead roles in Sound Thoma with Dileep and Pullipulikalum Aattinkuttiyum with Kunchacko Boban in which she played a Mohiniyattam dancer. She was not trained in Mohiniyattam and learned the dance steps at Saranya Mohan's dance school in Alappuzha for four days. Both films were successful and she was selected as Top Star (Female) 2013 in Malayalam.

In 2014, she was first seen in En Kadhal Pudhithu, her debut Tamil film directed by Maaris Kumar which had a delayed release, followed by Lijin Jose's Law Point in which she played a modern, city bred girl named Maya. In Lal Jose's Vikramadithyan, she played the role of Deepika, a Konkani girl, which required her to speak a few lines in Konkani, a language she had never used before. Her next film Villali Veeran, in which she paired once again with Dileep, had her playing the role of an ad filmmaker. Her last release in 2014 was Ormayundo Ee Mukham, a romantic drama in which she was cast opposite Vineeth Sreenivasan. Her first release of 2015 was Chandrettan Evideya where she portrayed the role of Dr.Geethanjali along with Dileep and Anusree.Her performance was critically acclaimed and she went on to receive her first nomination at Filmfare Award for Best Supporting Actress.

She has acted in many commercials of Bhima Jewellers, Francis Alukkas and Ripple Tea. She has participated in reality show ''''Ningalkkum Aakaam Kodeeshwaran'''' on Asianet.

In 2023, Namitha established Summer Town Cafe, a vintage cafe located in Panampilly Nagar, Kochi.

== Filmography ==
Key
| † | Denotes films that have not yet been released |

- All films are in Malayalam language unless otherwise noted.

=== Film ===
| Year | Title | Role | Notes |
|---|---|---|---|
| 2011 | Traffic | Riya | Debut (Child Artist) |
| 2012 | Puthiya Theerangal | Thamara | Debut as lead actress |
| 2013 | Sound Thoma | Sreelakshmi | |
| 2013 | Pullipulikalum Aattinkuttiyum | Kainakari Jayasree | |
| 2014 | En Kaadhal Pudhithu | Nandini | Tamil film |
| 2014 | Law Point | Maya | |
| 2014 | Vikramadithyan | Deepika Pai | |
| 2014 | Villali Veeran | Narmada | |
| 2014 | Ormayundo Ee Mukham | Nitya | |
| 2015 | Chandrettan Evideya | Dr. Geethanjali/ Vasanthamallika | |
| 2015 | Amar Akbar Anthony | Jennie | |
| 2015 | Adi Kapyare Kootamani | Adhishta Lekshmi | |
| 2016 | Chuttalabbai | Kavya | Telugu film |
| 2017 | Role Models | Shreya | |
| 2017 | Kathalo Rajakumari | Sita | Telugu film |
| 2018 | Nimir | Malarvizhi (Malar) | Tamil film |
| 2018 | Kammara Sambhavam | Bhanumathy | |
| 2019 | Margamkali | Urmila | |
| 2020 | Al Mallu | Nayana | |
| 2021 | Aanu | Alma | |
| 2022 | Eesho | Aswathy | |
| 2022 | Viral Sebi | Herself | Cameo appearance |
| 2023 | Rajni | Gauri | Bilingual film in Malayalam and Tamil |
| 2023 | Aval Peyar Rajni | Gauri | Bilingual film in Malayalam and Tamil |
| 2023 | A Ranjith Cinema | Pournami | |
| 2024 | Once Upon a Time in Kochi | ACP Sreya J Menon | Cameo appearance |
| 2024 | Cup | Coach Sandhya | |
| 2025 | Machante Maalakha | Bijimol | |

=== Television ===
| Year | Serial | Role | Channel |
|---|---|---|---|
| 2021 | Madhavi (Short film) | Madhavi | Flowers TV |
| 2008 | Ulladakkam | Title song appearance | Amrita TV |
| 2008-2010 | Ente Manasaputhri | Anjali | Asianet |
| 2007 | Vellankanni Mathavu | Mathavu | Surya TV |
| 2007 | Amme Devi | Devi | Surya TV |
| 2006 | Mylanchy Mazha | Amina | Music Album |

== Awards ==
| Year | Film | Award | Category | Result |
|---|---|---|---|---|
| 2013 | Puthiya Theerangal | Amrita Film Awards | New Face of the Year | Won |
| 2013 | Puthiya Theerangal | 2nd SIIMA Awards | Best Female Debutant | Nominated |
| 2014 | Pullipulikalum Aattinkuttiyum | Asianet Film Awards | Popular Actress | Won |
| 2014 | Pullipulikalum Aattinkuttiyum | Asianet Film Awards | Best Actress | Nominated |
| 2015 | Ormayundo Ee Mukham | Asianet Film Awards | Best Star Pair | Won |
| 2015 | Ormayundo Ee Mukham | Asianet Film Awards | Best Character Actress | Nominated |
| 2015 | Vikramadithyan | Vanitha Film Awards | Best Star Pair | Won |
| 2015 | Vikramadithyan | 4th SIIMA Awards | Best Actress – Malayalam | Nominated |
| 2016 | Chandrettan Evideya | Filmfare Awards | Best Supporting Actress – Malayalam | Nominated |
| 2016 | Chandrettan Evideya | 1st IIFA Utsavam | Best Supporting Actress | Nominated |
| 2016 | Chandrettan Evideya | 5th SIIMA Awards | Best Supporting Actress – Malayalam | Nominated |
| 2016 | Chandrettan Evideya | Anand TV Awards | Best Actress | Nominated |
| 2016 | Amar Akbar Anthony | Vanitha Film Awards | Most Popular Actress | Won |
| 2016 | Adi Kapyare Kootamani | Vanitha Film Awards | Most Popular Actress | Won |
