= Bibin George =

Indian actor and scriptwriter

- Born: 29 March 1988 (age 38)
- Education: Maharaja's College, Ernakulam
- Occupations: Actor; screenwriter
- Spouse: Philomena Greeshma (m. 2018)
- Children: 1

Bibin George (born 29 March 1988) is an Indian actor and screenwriter known for his works primarily in the Malayalam film industry. He has acted in the films Margamkali (2019), Thirimali (2022), Oru Pazhaya Bomb Kadha (2018) and Oru Yamandan Premakadha (2019).

== Personal life ==
Bibin George is married to Philomena Greeshma. The couple have a daughter.

== Filmography ==
Key
†	Denotes films that have not yet been released

=== As actor ===
Year	Title	Role	Notes
2013	Ravu		
2015	Kerala Today	Local goon	
2015	Amar Akbar Anthony	Furniture Shop Employee	
2016	Welcome to Central Jail	Kalari Aashan	
2016	Kattappanayile Rithwik Roshan	Naxalite	
2017	Role Models	Beggar	
2018	Oru Pazhaya Bomb Kadha	Sreekuttan	
2019	Margamkali	Sachithananthan	
2019	Oru Yamandan Premakadha	Davis	
2020	Shylock	Velmurugan	
2022	Thirimali	Baby	
2022	Pathonpatham Noottandu	Koran	
2023	Vedikettu	Jitheesh	Also co-director
2024	Bad Boyz	Sintappan	
2024	Gumasthan	Eby	
2025	Koodal		
2026	Shukran		

Year	Film	Notes
2015	Amar Akbar Anthony	Co-writer Vishnu Unnikrishnan
2016	Kattappanayile Rithwik Roshan	Co-writer, Vishnu Unnikrishnan
2019	Oru Yamandan Premakadha	Co-writer, Vishnu Unnikrishnan
2023	Vedikettu	Co-writer, Vishnu Unnikrishnan

== Awards and nominations ==
- Asianet Best Screenwriter Award - Won for the film Kattappanayile Rithwik Roshan
- SIIMA Award for Best Debut Actor - Nominated for the film Oru Pazhaya Bomb Kadha
