= Vedikettu =

2023 Malayalam film

Vedikkettu
- Theatrical release poster
- Directed by: Vishnu Unnikrishnan; Bibin George
- Written by: Vishnu Unnikrishnan; Bibin George
- Produced by: Gokulam Gopalan; NM Badusha; Shinoy Mathew
- Starring: Vishnu Unnikrishnan; Bibin George; Aishwarya Anil Kumar; Samad Sulaiman; Rithin Roy
- Cinematography: Ratheesh Ram
- Edited by: Johnkutty
- Music by: Shyam Prasad; Shibu Pularkazhcha; Arjun V Akshaya; Arun Raj
- Production company: Sree Gokulam Movies
- Release date: 3 February 2023
- Country: India
- Language: Malayalam

Vedikkettu is a 2023 Indian Malayalam-language film directed by Vishnu Unnikrishnan and Bibin George and produced under Sree Gokulam Movies. It features Vishnu Unnikrishnan, Bibin George, Aishwarya Anil Kumar, Samad Sulaiman as the main leads. The film was released on 3 February 2023 in theatres and streaming on the OTT ZEE5 from 16 April 2023. The film received mixed reviews from critics and audiences alike, although the performances of Vishnu Unnikrishnan and Bibin George were praised.

== Cast ==
- Vishnu Unnikrishnan as Shibuttan
- Bibin George as Chitheresh
- Aishwarya Anil Kumar as Shimily
- Samad Sulaiman as Suni
- Reghunath Paleri as Doctor (cameo appearance)
- Rithin Roy as Ambady
- Dhipu N Babu as Deepu
- Sivadas Marampally as Brother

== Production ==
The Trailer of the film was released in January 2023. Later the production team announced the release date 3 February 2023.

== Music ==
=== Track listing ===
| No. | Title | Singer(s) | Length |
|---|---|---|---|
| 1. | "Adana Kandalum" | Shibu Pularkazhcha, Amal Jose | 3:24 |
| Total length: | | | 3:24 |

== Reception ==
The film was released 3 February 2023 in theatres. A critic from Firstpost noted that "The conversation has zero link to the rest of Vedikkettu" and gave 0.5 rating out of 5. Vignesh Madhu of The Indian Express stated that " As the end credits roll, we learn that a real-life incident inspired the film. One cannot think but wonder how the writer-director duo made such a plot out of it. Commendable indeed." and gave 3.5 rating out of 5. Shilpa S critic of OTTplay wrote that "Writer-directors Vishnu Unnikrishnan and Bibin George have certainly delivered an entertaining watch in the form of Vedikettu. However, the entertainment and intrigue the first half offers is something the second half fails to provide, with the latter being plagued by a sluggish pace, predictability in its story and convoluted writing." and gave 3 out of 5 ratings. ManoramaOnline and IndianExpress.com critic gave mixed reviews.
