= Kattappanayile Rithwik Roshan =

Kattappanayile Hrithik Roshan
- Theatrical release poster
- Directed by: Nadirshah
- Written by: Bibin George; Vishnu Unnikrishnan
- Produced by: Dileep; Dr. Zachariah Thomas
- Starring: Vishnu Unnikrishnan; Dharmajan Bolgatty; Siddique; Salim Kumar; Prayaga Martin; Siju Wilson
- Cinematography: Shamdat Sainudeen
- Edited by: Johnkutty
- Music by: Songs: Nadirsha; Background Score: Bijibal
- Production companies: Nad Group; United Global Media Entertainment
- Distributed by: Kalasangham Films
- Release date: 18 November 2016
- Running time: 139 minutes
- Country: India
- Language: Malayalam
- Box office: est. ₹24 crore

Kattappanayile Hrithik Roshan (transl. Hrithik Roshan of Kattappana) is a 2016 Indian Malayalam-language romantic comedy-drama film directed by Nadirshah. It stars Vishnu Unnikrishnan in the title role along with Prayaga Martin, Siddique, Salim Kumar, Dharmajan Bolgatty and Siju Wilson in the supporting roles.

The film was released worldwide on 18 November 2016 to generally positive reviews from critics and was one of the biggest blockbuster Malayalam films of 2016 at the box office.

== Plot ==
Krishnan Nair a.k.a. Kichu was once a child artist and wants to become a superstar in the film industry. However, he is typecast in minor roles similar to those he performed as a child. He is constantly taunted by the townspeople for this as well as for his skin colour.

Ann Mariya, a newcomer to Kattappana, becomes Kichu's friend quickly, believing him to be well connected with the film industry. Kichu initially mistakes her friendship for love, and is shattered when he realizes that this is not the case. The same day he has a film shoot where the director, James Antony, believes that he is the right person to portray the role of the central character. However, the producer does not want to risk a newcomer in the central role and thus Kichu loses his big chance.

Returning home, he faces yet another problem where two girls whom he had sent to a nearby film location were mistreated. One of them is Kani, Kichu's neighbor. Kani is in love with Kichu however he barely even acknowledges her. The gathering mob accuses Kichu of orchestrating the girls' misfortunes leading to his father, Surendran, kicking him out of the house. Kichu, out of despair, decides to commit suicide.

As he is about to commit suicide by jumping off a cliff, a car drives towards him. In the driver's attempt to avoid hitting Kichu, the car drifts and tumbles over near the planned suicide point. The driver is Giridhar, an influential businessman in the town and someone Kichu admires. After rescuing him, Giridhar tells Kichu that suicide is not an answer to problems and motivates him to live life and achieve his goals.

Another person named Geo comes to the same cliff to commit suicide. His girlfriend, Neethu has abandoned him for Amith, leaving him heartbroken. While there, Geo reads Kichu's suicide note describing his story. He then changes his mind about suicide and decides to meet Kichu.

Kichu now decides to overcome the various prejudices that society has shown him all of his life. He realizes and acknowledges Kani's love and becomes friends with Ann even though she had previously rejected his romantic overtures. He works on overcoming his inferiority complexes. Kichu, Kani and Ann attends the wedding of Amith with Neethu, where he learns that Amith and Ann are not in love but just friends.

Kichu is called again to don the role of a petty thief in a movie. At the location. However, it turns out that the role is being done by another person and Kichu is actually the hero of the film.

== Cast ==
- Vishnu Unnikrishnan as Krishnan Nair (Kichu)
  - Adish Praveen as Young Kichu
- Siju Wilson as Geo (Extended cameo)
- Dharmajan Bolgatty as Bibin Das "Dasappan", Kichu's childhood friend
- Siddique as Surendran Nair (Sura) alias Jr Jayan, Kichu's father
- Salim Kumar as 'Naxalite' Chandran, Kani's father and Sura's best friend
- Lijomol Jose as Kani, Kichu's neighbour
- Prayaga Martin as Ann Maria
- Dini Daniel as Seema, Kichu's mother
- Swasika as Neethu, Geo's ex-girlfriend
- Pradeep Kottayam as Vijayan, Dasappan's father
- Rahul Madhav as Giridhar
- Kalabhavan Shajon as Director James Antony
- Seema G. Nair as Kani's mother
- Jaffar Idukki as Tea shop owner
- Mahesh as Geo's father
- Ambika Mohan as Geo's Mother
- Eloor George as Head load worker
- Kalabhavan Yousuf as Barber
- Kalabhavan Haneef as Sasi (Soman), Head load worker
- Samadh as Neethu's relative
- Shahanas Muhammed Arafa
- Bipin Jose as Amith
- Abdul Majeed as Headmaster
- Abu Salim as Hameed, Gym Parlour owner
- Nandu Pothuval as Sthiram Vazhipokken
- Vinod Kedamangalam as Salesman
- Adinad Sasi as Villager
- Bineesh Bastin as Sthiram Gunda
- Rajesh as Poovalan 1
- Ajoobsha as Poovalan 2
- Kevin Mathew as Poovalan 3
- N P Suhaid (Kukku)
- Bibin George as Naxalite
- Kottayam Nazir (Guest Appearance) as Director Ajayan
- Nadirshah as director (cameo)
- Boban Samuel as director (cameo)
- Ancy as Teacher
- Asha Aravind as Jessy
- Pauly Valsan as Upadeshi thalla
- Thara Kalyan as Neethu's relative
- Sethulakshmi as Neethu's relative
- Neena Kurup as Neethu's mother
- Devika Nambiar as Neethu's Friend
- Ansiba Hassan as Actress (Guest Appearance)

== Music ==
Nadirshah composed the music and Bijibal worked on the background score for the film. The lyrics for the four songs is written by SanthoshVarma and B. K. Harinarayanan.

Kattappanayile Rithwik Roshan

Soundtrack album by Nadirshah
- Released: 28 October 2016
- Genre: Feature film Soundtrack
- Length: 15:03
- Language: Malayalam
- Label: Millennium audios

Nadirshah chronology
Amar Akbar Anthony (2015)	Kattappanayile Rithwik Roshan (2016)

=== Track listing ===
No.	Title	Writer(s)	Singer(s)	Length
1.	"Azhake Azhake"	B.K Harinarayanan	Najim Arshad	3:19
2.	"Azhake Azhake Nanunae"	B.K Harinarayanan	Vijay Prakash	3:19
3.	"Minnaminnikkum"	Santhosh Varma	Shankar Mahadevan	3:47
4.	"Parudeyam Mariyame"	Nadirshah, Santhosh Varma	Rimi Tomy, Vaikom Vijayalakshmi	4:38
Total length:				15:03

== Release ==
The film was originally scheduled for release on 11 November 2016, but due to the unforeseen execution of the 500 and 1000 rupee currency demonetisation, which removed these bank notes from circulation, the release was pushed to 18 November 2016.

== Reception ==
Sanjith Sidhardhan critic of The Times of India gave 3 stars out of 5 and wrote that " Nadirshah has also made it a point in his movie to deliver some social messages and this time it touches on parental pressure, the effect and consequence of society's perception of people and how people seem to take granted the valuable things in life ". Anna MM Vetticad of Firstpost rated 2.5 out of 5 and wrote that "Kattappanayile Rithwik Roshan is entertaining and moving for the most part."

Mythily Ramachandran critic of Gulf News noted that "It will be an evening well enjoyed."

== Box office ==
The film received generally positive reviews from critics and was a commercial success. It grossed ₹ 14 crores alone from Kerala and ₹ 24 crores from Worldwide box office.
