= Machante Maalakha =

2025 film by Boban Samuel

- Theatrical release poster
- Directed by: Boban Samuel
- Written by: Ajeesh P. Thomas
- Story by: Jexson Antony
- Produced by: Abraham Mathew
- Starring: Soubin Shahir; Dhyan Sreenivasan; Namitha Pramod; Dileesh Pothan
- Cinematography: Vivekh Menon
- Edited by: Ratheesh Raj
- Music by: Ouseppachan
- Production company: Abaam Movies
- Release date: 27 February 2025
- Country: India
- Language: Malayalam
- Budget: ₹5.12 crore

Machante Maalakha is a 2025 Malayalam-language comedy drama film directed by Boban Samuel, written by Ajeesh P. Thomas and produced by Abraham Mathew under the banner of Abaam Movies. The film stars Soubin Shahir, Dhyan Sreenivasan, Namitha Pramod and Dileesh Pothan in lead roles. The songs and background score were composed by Ouseppachan, while Vivekh Menon and Ratheesh Raj handled the cinematography and editing. Machante Maalakha was earlier scheduled to be released on 14 June 2024, but was postponed and then released on 27 February 2025. The film received negative reviews from critics.

== Plot ==
The movie starts with Sajeevan, a simple and friendly guy, who is a KSRTC conductor who is close to his sister and brother in law and his nieces. The story is about how he clashes with a passenger Bijimol. Over the course of their interactions, Sajeevan begins to develop an affection for Bijimol and visits her family to ask for her hand in marriage. Bijimol's mother Kunjumol is an overbearing and loudmouthed lady who is a control freak and likes to hold sway over all elements around her including her husband Gopi. The marriage alliance is accepted under the condition that Sajeevan would live at Kunjumol's house.

Over time, Bijimol who also has control issues like her mother, along with the prodding of the mother, begin to create issues in Sajeevan's life. In a twist of fate, Sajeevan befalls a critical accident and needs a kidney transplant. While his sister prepares to offer him her kidney, Bijimol beats them to the draw and offers her kidney, against her mother's wishes but it is revealed, that the idea is more out of her desire to have further power over Sajeevan rather than her love to her husband.

In a series of misunderstandings, Bijimol assumes that Sajeevan is drinking alcohol during his recovery, thus feeling cheated that he has no value for her sacrifice and this leads to a confrontation which results in her slapping Sajeevan's friend Ramesan, and eventually getting slapped by Sajeevan when she insults Sajeevan's brother in law Dasan. Eventually things are taken further by Kunjumol as she instigates a police case over the assault and demands that Sajeevan return the kidney donated to him or offer compensation in lieu of the same. Advocate Jijo, an opportunistic advocate is their chosen legal representation. In court through a series of exaggerated and fake claims and irrelevant arguments, the case is taken forward till one day, Bijimol falls unconscious in court which results in the finding that she is pregnant.

Kunjumol eventually tries to push matters further by trying to push the child's parentage onto Jijo who at this point also feels guilty and together they confront Kunjumol and Bijimol agreeing to all her terms but in return wishes to view his child and try to explain the poison being spread by Kunjumol. In a series of events involving the sale of a buffalo at the same time and its attack during the arguments and chaos, Kunjumol is fatally pushed into a well and we cut to the future. Bijimol and Sajeevan have reconciled and have a daughter who is also indicated to being aggressive as the movie concludes.

== Cast ==
- Soubin Shahir as Sajeevan, KSRTC Conductor
- Dhyan Sreenivasan as Adv. Jijo Thattumpuram
- Namitha Pramod as Bijimol, Sajeevan's wife
- Shanthi Krishna as Kunjumol, Bijimol's mother
- Dileesh Pothan as Dasan, Sajeevan's elder brother
- Manoj K. U. as Gopi, Bijimol's father
- Vineeth Thattil as Ramesan, Dasan's friend
- Sheelu Abraham as Adv. Lakshmi Rajan
- Lal Jose as Judge R. P Menon
- Arya Rohit as Rameshan wife
- Sruthy Jayan as Dasan's wife

== Production ==
The film is written by Ajeesh P. Thomas, known for his work on Vikruthi. Abraham Mathew and Sheelu Abraham served as joint producers under the banner Abaam Movies. The shooting of the film began on 13 July 2023.

== Music ==
The songs and background score are composed by Ouseppachan, in his first collaboration with Soubin Shahir and Boban Samuel.

== Reception ==
=== Critical reception ===
The film received negative reviews from critics. S. R. Praveen of The Hindu criticised the film, calling it "outdated and regressive" and wrote that the film "portrays male characters as victims and perpetuates regressive gender stereotypes, making it a dated and uncomfortable watch."

Anjana George of The Times of India rated the film 1 out of 5 stars and described it as a "tone-deaf relic from a past best left behind." The review heavily criticises the film for using the "age-old trope of Poor Husbands vs Dreadful Wives." The characters are labelled as "one-dimensional and cartoonish," and the plot as a "jumbled mess."

Vivek Santhosh of Cinema Express gave 1 out of 5 stars and wrote: "A clumsy, outdated take on emotional abuse in marriage, the film swaps roles but not stereotypes, relying heavily on unfunny jokes and badly staged melodrama."

Princy Alexander of Onmanorama compared the film to the Tamil film Mappillai, praising the film's music, performance, and the film for advocating for men's rights without turning into a "men's movie" and criticizes the for the "black-and-white portrayal of the mother-in-law's villany", and it lacked narrative depth.

Cris of The News Minute has written that Machante Maalakha "could have been a nice satire, set in a parallel universe where gender roles are reversed. But its writers are serious about their message of saving all the poor males in the world from cruel, merciless women."
