= Munshi (TV series) =

Indian Malayalam-language political and social satire television programme

- Directed by: Anil Banerjee
- Country of origin: India
- Original language: Malayalam
- No. of seasons: 1
- No. of episodes: 8808

Production
- Production location: Kerala

Original release
- Network: Asianet News
- Release: September 2000 – present

Munshi is an Indian Malayalam-language political and social satire television programme that airs on the Malayalam news channel Asianet News. It has been airing continuously since September 2000. This live cartoon show is written and directed by Anil Banerjee.

== Characters ==
Characters are sketched such that they come from a widely different backgrounds, with different political and religious outlooks. It sets a secular atmosphere in the show.

- Munshi - the khadi-clad central character
- School student - seen with a Pazhampori in his hand
- Kariyachan - seen with neck brace
- Panicker - always wearing formals
- Motta - carrying a rooster in his hands
- Hajiyar - carries an umbrella
- Thirumeni - a Hindu priest
- Sakhavu - a comrade who addresses everyone else as 'Sakhavu'
- President

== Format ==
Each episode takes up a social or political topic that is part of the current affairs. The characters, who belong to different socio-political backgrounds, narrates their opinion on the issue. The three-to-five minute strip ends with Munshi stating his view on the topic, often with a quirky proverb or pithy quote. The Munshi never takes part in others' discussion, his sole role is in delivering the final comment. The show begins and ends with a rooster's crowing sound.

== Cast and crew ==
- Munshi was initially played by KP Sivasankara Kurup for the first 10 years of the show. Later on he was replaced by Achuthath Vasudevan Krishnan Moosad.
- School student - Shreeju Nedumangad
- Kariyachan - Ayyappan
- Panicker - Sreekumar
- Hajiyar - Rajendran
- Sakhavu - Madhu Elavattom
- Motta - Hari
- Cameraman - Ajai Kumar G R
