= Oru Pazhaya Bomb Kadha =

- Theatrical release poster
- Directed by: Shafi
- Written by: Binju Joseph; Sunil Karma
- Produced by: Allwyn Antony, Gijo Kavanal, Sreejith Ramachandran, Dr. Zachariah Thomas
- Starring: Bibin George; Prayaga Martin; Hareesh Kanaran
- Cinematography: Vinod Illampally
- Edited by: V. Saajan
- Music by: Arunraj (Songs); Bijibal (Background Score)
- Release date: 20 July 2018
- Country: India
- Language: Malayalam

Oru Pazhaya Bomb Kadha (English: An Old Bomb Story) is a 2018 Indian action comedy film originally released in Malayalam. It was directed by Shafi and written by Binju Joseph, Shafi, and Sunil Karma. The film stars Bibin George, Prayaga Martin and Hareesh Kanaran. It was produced by Allwyn Antony, Gijo Kavanal, Sreejith Ramachandran and Zachariah Thomas under United Global United Media.

== Plot ==
The film begins in Bombay with police officers chasing Rudra Nayak, a dangerous terrorist who has been branded as a Maoist. However, his group escapes and secretly arrives in Kerala. The film then introduces Sreekuttan who is a handicapped mechanic, whose best friend, Bhavyan, is also a mechanic.

Sreekuttan falls for Shruti and attempts to woo her with his charm. Unfortunately, Shruti doesn't reciprocate, which leaves him devastated. One day Sreekuttan and Bhavyan receive a call to fix a car. The duo tricks the car owner because of his behaviour towards them and makes him push the car. They then leave him there after seeing Shruti and her friend in the distance. Later, they realises that the car owner is the new police inspector in town, Rajendran. When Rajendran realizes that he has been tricked, he gets back at Sreekuttan and Bhavyan. Due to this incident, Sreekuttan is unable to pay medical bills for his father, who later passes away. This incident infuriates Sreekuttan.

He sets out to confront Rajendran, which leads to a fist fight that Sreekutan loses. This series of events makes Sreekutan so angry that he vows vengeance on Rajendran. In a disturbed frame of mind, he decides to plant a bomb in the Rajendran's car with the help of his old friend Unni who has been released from jail for a bombing incident.

Though initially reluctant, Unni later agrees to help him make the bomb. He refuses to make it by himself as he promised his mother that he would not make any more bombs. Sreekuttan's intention was to hurt Rajendran so that he could bear the same pain as him, but Bhavyan's intentions were different and he secretly asks Unni to create a deadly bomb that would kill the Rajendran instead of only hurting him. Amidst all this Rudra Nayak seeks refuge in the village.

One night, while the duo enter Rajendran's house and plant the time bomb in his jeep, Rajendran enters the jeep. Sreekuttan sets the time to 45 minutes. They briefly follow the jeep, but then lose it. Rajendran goes to Rudra Nayak's hideout from where he escaped and seizes their weapons. On his way back, he sees Bhavyan standing near his bike with a bottle of alcohol while Sreekuttan is urinating in the bushes. Rajendran dislikes those who drink, as a result, he arrests Bhavyan and takes him to the police station in his jeep. All this time the timer is ticking away. With just a few minutes before the bomb is set to explode, Bhavyan tries to escape using a number of excuses, but fails to do so. The bomb is deactivated when the jeep gets jammed in a gutter allowing Bhavyan to get away. When Sreekuttan realizes that the bomb, didn't explode he comes up with another plan. He decides to thrash Rajendran and make him to apologise.

One night, while Rajendran is driving, with the intention to capture Rudra Nayak, he receives a warning from his superior that Rudra Nayak is very dangerous and might attack him. Amidst all this, Sreekuttan sets his plan in motion. He placed a sack on Rajendran's route. Spotting the suspicious sack, Rajendran investigates, which is when he hears some noises coming from the jungle nearby. He decides to follow the noise and goes deeper into the jungle, where Sreekuttan awaits. As soon as Rajendran is in range, Sreekutan throws chilli powder at him, blinding him. Then, Sreekuttan tie him up, beat him brutally and throw him in the well. Immediately after the incident, they both takes Rajendran to the hospital. When Rajendran regains consciousness, he thinks that he was beaten up by Rudra Nayak and was saved by Sreekuttan and Bhavyan. Rajendran thanks them and apologizes for beating Sreekuttan. Thus, Sreekuttan accomplishes his mission.

Shruti then meets him and apologizes for behaving rudely. She thanks him for saving Rajendran, who was revealed to be her father, who got separated from her mother and now they have reunited. She walks away indicating her feelings for him. Meanwhile, Rudra Nayak attacks the police station with his gang and takes back their weapons. He accidentally chooses the jeep with the bomb while trying to escape. On their way, the bomb gets activated and explodes, killing Rudra Nayak and his group.

== Cast ==
- Bibin George as Sreekuttan
- Prayaga Martin as Shruti
- Hareesh Kanaran as Bhavyan, Sreekuttan's Childhood best friend
- Vishnu Unnikrishnan as Unnikrishnan.P (Cameo)
- Indrans as Mohanan, Sreekuttan's father
- Kalabhavan Shajohn as S.I Rajendran, Sruti's father
- Vijayaraghavan as Palathara Joseph
- Harisree Asokan as Kumaran Asan
- Sreevidya Mullachery as Sowmya, Sreekuttan's sister
- Binu Adimali as villager
- Balachandran Chullikadu as Rohith Shetty
- Sunil Sukhada as Chacko
- Baiju Ezhupunna as Faizal
- Bijukuttan as Shasi
- Kulappulli Leela
- Ponnamma Babu as Mollykutty Joseph
- Narayanankutty
- Sohan Seenulal
- Dinesh Prabhakar
- Kalabhavan Haneef
- Shafeeq Rahman as Rudra Nayak, A Terrorist leader
- Sajan Palluruthy
- Babu Annur
- Santhosh Keezhattoor
- Annie as Ganga
- Salim Kumar as Manavalan, Bhavyan's Okhi Brother-in-law (Photo Credit)
- Ameya Mathew as Ancy

== Release ==
Oru Pazhaya Bomb Kadha was released in India on 20 July 2018.
