= Hareesh Kanaran =

Indian comedian and film actor

Hareesh Perumanna
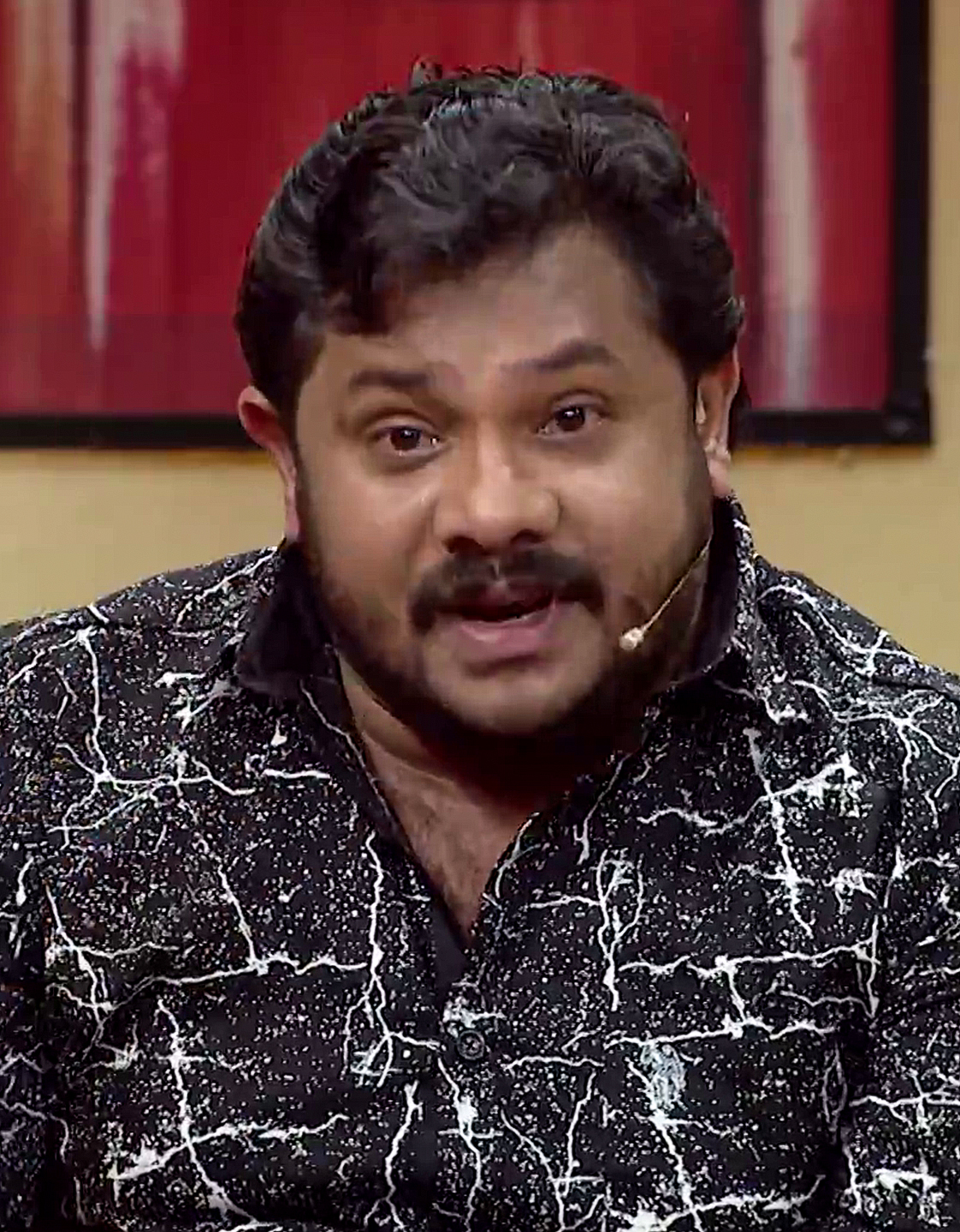
- Born: Perumanna, Kozhikode, Kerala, India
- Occupations: Actor, comedian
- Years active: 2014–present
- Spouse: Sandhya
- Children: 2

Hareesh Perumanna, known by his stage name Hareesh Kanaran, is an Indian comedian and film actor who appears in Malayalam films. He is best known for his stock character Jaliyan Kanaran which first appeared in Comedy Festival, a comedy reality show in Mazhavil Manorama.

== Personal life ==
Hareesh was born at Perumanna village in Kozhikode district of Kerala, India. He had his primary education at Govt. Ganapath High School for Boys in Kozhikode. He performed in the drama Naatam on school youth festival which was ranked first in the drama category. Hareesh married Sandhya, a school teacher and they have a son named Dhyan Hari and a daughter.

== Career ==
Hareesh began his career as a mimicry artist in a troupe named "Calicut Friends". He later joined troupes such as Calicut Super Jokes and V4 Calicut. He made his television debut in the Malayalam comedy reality show, Comedy Festival, aired in Mazhavil Manorama. His character as Jalianwala Kanaran made him a popular figure among the audiences. He made his film debut in the 2014 Malayalam film, Ulsaha Committee.

== Filmography ==
Key
†	Denotes films that have not yet been released

Year	Title	Role	Ref.
2014	Ulsaha Committee	Jaliyan Kanaran	
2014	Sapthamashree Thaskaraha	Ganeshan	
2015	Ellam Chettante Ishtam Pole		
2015	Salt Mango Tree	Shafique	
2015	Oru Second Class Yathra	Auto-rikshaw driver	
2015	Nee-Na	P. Kunhimuhammad	
2015	Acha Dhin	Madanan	
2015	Ben		
2015	Kunjiramayanam	Ratheesh	
2015	Rajamma @ Yahoo	Chandran	
2015	Two Countries	Sajan Koyilandi	
2016	Hello Namasthe	Rameshan	
2016	Appuram Bengal Ippuram Thiruvithamkoor		
2016	Darvinte Parinamam	Hareesh	
2016	Kali	Hamsa	
2016	Mudhugauv	Putheri	
2016	King Liar	Pushpakumar/Pushpu	
2016	Marubhoomiyile Aana	Satheesan	
2016	Oppam	Veeran	
2016	Welcome to Central Jail	Swami	
2016	Swarna Kaduva	Joju	
2016	Kappiri Thuruthu	Thapala Pookunju	
2017	Puthan Panam	Chandru	
2017	Georgettan's Pooram	Chayakadakkaran	
2017	Rakshadhikari Baiju Oppu	Vineeth	
2017	Pullikkaran Staraa	Bharathan	
2017	Aana Alaralodalaral	Dasaradhan	
2017	Basheerinte Premalekhanam		
2017	Prethamundu Sookshikukka		
2017	Chunkzz	Preman	
2017	Gandhinagaril Unniyarcha		
2017	Vishwa Vikhyatharaya Payyanmar	P.P Shibu	
2017	Godha	DhimDhi	
2017	Goodalochana	Jamsheer	
2017	Oru Cinemakkaran	Apartment Security	
2017	Sherlock Toms	Fakruddin aka Fakru	
2017	Honeybee 2.5		
2017	Kadamkadha		
2018	Diwanjimoola Grand Prix	Ganeshan	
2018	Shikkari Shambhu	Shaji	
2018	Street Lights	Thief	
2018	Chanakya Thanthram	Avinash	
2018	Kalyanam	Sarath's Uncle/ Aveesh Kumar	
2018	Kuttanadan Marpappa	Thief	
2018	Tanaha		
2018	Oru Pazhaya Bomb Kadha	Bhavyan	
2018	Thobama	Kappalandi Karunan	
2018	Kinavalli	Appu Shanti	
2018	Padayottam	Kasargode Ratheesh	
2018	Mangalyam Thanthunanena	Shamzu	
2018	Aanakkallan	Ishow	
2018	Thattumpurath Achuthan	Shoukath	
2018	Ente Ummante Peru	Beeran	
2019	Sakalakalashala	Nari	
2019	Allu Ramendran	Coach Vijayan	
2019	Lonappante Mamodeesa	Shameer	
2019	Oru Adaar Love	PT Sir	
2019	Swarna Malsyangal		
2019	And the Oscar Goes To...	Babumon	
2019	Sachin	Poocha Shyju	
2019	Fancy Dress	Seban	
2019	Pattabhiraman	Shukoor	
2019	Ittymaani: Made in China	Joji Pothen	
2019	Ganagandharvan	P C Joji	
2019	Chila NewGen Nattuvisheshangal	Sampath	
2019	Jimmy Ee Veedinte Aiswaryam	Ayyappan	
2019	Aakasha Ganga 2	College principal	
2019	Margamkali	TikTok Unni	
2019	Children's Park	Dinakaran	
2019	Oru Yamandan Premakadha	Francis	
2020	Dhamaka	Dr.Sexena	
2020	Shylock	Ganapathi	
2020	Gauthamante Radham	Basheer	
2020	Sufiyum Sujatayum	Ashokan	
2020	Kanaronam	Kanaran	
2021	Kurup	Police Officer Vishwambaran	
2021	Keshu Ee Veedinte Nadhan	Lottery agent Ganapathi	
2022	Kallan D`Souza		
2022	Mei Hoom Moosa	Thaami	
2022	Padachone Ingalu Kaatholee	Kerala Kumaran (KK)	
2022	Upacharapoorvam Gunda Jayan	Pachadi Sura	
2022	Shubhadinam		
2022	Mahi		
2022	Vamanan		
2023	Momo In Dubai		
2024	Palayam PC		
2025	Police Day		
2025	Madhura Kanakku		
TBA	Kuruthola Perunnal †		
TBA	Anjil Oral †		

== Television ==
Year	Title	Role	Channel	Notes	Ref.
2014	Comedy Festival	Participant	Mazhavil Manorama	Reality show	
2018	Badai Bungalow	Guest	Asianet	Reality show	
2020	Comedy Stars	Guest	Asianet	Reality show	
2022	OJO Kanmani	Jaliyan Kanaran	YouTube	Web series	
2026	Selfie Family	Priyan	Mazhavil Manorama	Sitcom	

== Awards and nominations ==
Year	Award	Category	Film(s)	Result
2017	South Indian International Movie Awards	Best Comedian	Rakshadhikari Baiju Oppu	Nominated
2018	Asianet Film Awards	Best Actor in a Humorous Role	Various	Won
2018	Vanitha Film Awards	Best Comedian	Aanakkallan, Oru Pazhaya Bomb Kadha	Won
2019	Vanitha Film Awards	Best Comedian	Various	Won
2021	South Indian International Movie Awards	Best Comedian	Shylock	Nominated

== Controversy ==
In November 2025, Kanaran claimed some allegations against the producer and production controller, N. M. Badusha. He claimed that Badusha borrowed ₹20 Lakhs from Kanaran and never repaid him. During the construction of Kanaran's new home, he asked Badusha for the money and Badusha said he would return soon. Kanaran approached the AMMA association before regarding the matter. However, he later found himself expelled from acting in movies. Kanaran also believes that Badusha used his influence to stop his screen presence. During the shot of ARM, Kanaran was supposed to do a role but was not called. During awards night, Tovino Thomas asked why he wasn’t a part of the movie and the team claimed he didn’t have any available dates.
