= Amar Akbar Anthony (2015 film) =

- Theatrical release poster
- Directed by: Nadirshah
- Written by: Bibin George; Vishnu Unnikrishnan
- Produced by: Zachariah Thomas; Alwin Antony
- Starring: Prithviraj Sukumaran; Jayasurya; Indrajith Sukumaran; Namitha Pramod
- Cinematography: Sujith Vaassudev
- Edited by: Johnkutty
- Music by: Songs: Nadirshah; Background Score: Bijibal
- Production companies: United Global Media Entertainment; Ananya Films
- Distributed by: Thameens Release & Tricolor Entertainment
- Release date: 16 October 2015
- Running time: 145 minutes
- Country: India
- Language: Malayalam
- Box office: ₹50 crore

Amar Akbar Anthony is a 2015 Indian Malayalam-language action comedy film directed by Nadirshah and written by Bibin George and Vishnu Unnikrishnan. It stars Prithviraj Sukumaran, Jayasurya and Indrajith Sukumaran in titular roles, alongside an ensemble cast including Namitha Pramod, Siddique, Saju Navodaya, Kalabhavan Shajohn, Meenakshi Anoop, Srindha, K. P. A. C. Lalitha, Sasi Kalinga, Shafeeq Rahman, Abu Salim, Bindu Panicker, Kottayam Pradeep, V.K Sreeraman and Asif Ali. The music is composed by Nadirshah, while the background music is given by Bijibal. It was released on 16 October 2015.

The production of Amar Akbar Anthony was completed in 65 days. It became a major blockbuster at the box office. Its soundtrack was released by the Sony Music India.

== Plot ==
The plot revolves around three bachelor friends Amar, Akbar and Anthony who live in the same colony in Kochi. Their struggle to live a luxurious life and to visit Pattaya is constantly met with issues. The bike-stunt master and travel agent, Faizal, is also living in the same colony. He receives several injuries when he met an accident while performing bike stunts. He is then admitted to a hospital where he meets other patients. Faizal explains the reason for the accident to the other patients by narrating a story about his three clients Amar, Akbar and Anthony. The three are best friends, who are living a middle-class life.

Amar's father Ramanan works as a security officer at ATM counter, while his mother, Chandrika is a marriage broker, who arranges the marriage of orphan woman Resmiya, but Resmiya's husband runs off with her jewellery hence Resmiya arrives at Amar's house to stay with her kid Fathima whom they lovingly call Pathu. Akbar is a handicapped person, whose father, Stalin Mammali, is a communist bodybuilder while his mother Jameela is a homemaker. Anthony works as a pizza delivery boy at a mall, and is an orphan where his foster father Chakkappan found him left alone inside a movie theatre and lives with his step-parents.

All the friends have a common nemesis Nallavanyana Unni, a gentleman whom everyone likes in the colony, who is later arrested by the police for growing marijuana in his own terrace.

Apart from their usual work, the trio occasionally work as catering service boys for marriages and other functions under the supervision of Rejimon, whose mother usually engages herself with multiple social networking sites. She created a fake Facebook account and tried to make Amar fall in love with her. All three friends have a crush on Jenny, a dancer. Their only goal and dream is to visit Pattaya, Thailand. However, due to family issues, their aim gets delayed each time.

Meanwhile, Amar's father met with an accident and is saved by an ambulance driver name Jadayu Sabu and the money which was saved by the three friends was spent on his father's treatment. Simultaneously, a Bengali child abuser named Dhappan kidnaps small girls. Amar, Akbar and Anthony often bump into the man, but they do not care much about it. Meanwhile, during a celebration in the colony Pathu goes missing and later she is found murdered in a drainage. The new CI Sethunath suspects Dhappan in the case. He scolds the trio for being lazy and not reacting to the issue, which happened between them. Realising their mistake and being thirsty for revenge, the friends catches Dhappan after a long fight and Amar goes to kill him with a sword.

However, Sethunath stops Amar and reveals that Dhappan killed all the small girls but he didn't kill Pathu. However, Sanju, a boy in their colony who goes into mental depression after losing in a reality show, knows who is the main culprit. Amar, Akbar and Antony announced to the colony people that Sanju witnessed the scene and the culprit was their respected colony leader Mash, who was very much loved by Pathu. They along with the villagers attacks him and Dhappan. Amar tells Resmiya to avenge according to her wish and she stabs Mash with a bottle. On the other side, Dhappan is being stabbed to death by the people along with Mash and Akbar hits him with a stick, which he throws above. This stick flies through the sky and gets stuck in a bike which was racing by Faizal. It is at this point that its revealed that Faizal is a travel agent at Pattaya tour and travel. The trio starts a child protection and welfare charity fund under Pathu's name.

== Cast ==
- Prithviraj Sukumaran as Amarnath (Amar), a floor manager of a shopping mall
- Jayasurya as Akbar (Akku) a lift operator
  - Master Allen as Young Akbar
- Indrajith Sukumaran as Anthony (Thalapathy), a pizza delivery boy
- Namitha Pramod as Jenny, a dancer
- Baby Meenakshi as Fathima (Pathumma/Pathu)
- Siddique as CI Sethunath V. R.
- Saju Navodaya as Rejimon (Durantham Reji)
- Srinda Ashab as Resmina, Fathima's mother
- Kalabhavan Shajohn as Jadayu Sabu, an ambulance driver
- Sasi Kalinga as Ramanan, Amar's father
- Abu Salim as Stalin Mammali, Akbar's father
- Pradeep Kottayam as Chakkappan, Anthony's adopted father
- V. K. Sreeraman as Mash
- K. P. A. C. Lalitha as Chandrika, Amar's mother
- Bindu Panicker as Jameela, Akbar's mother
- Priyanka Anoop as Anthony's adopted mother
- Chali Pala as Sajeevan, police constable, Jenny's father
- Ramesh Pisharody as Nallavanaya Unni
- Balaji Sarma
- Sona Heiden as Sajeevan's daughter
- Shafique Rahman as Dhappan
- Dharmajan Bolgatty as 'Black' Suni
- Harimurali as Amalnath, Amar's brother
- Ena Saha as Amar's girlfriend
- Tarushi Jha as Amar's girlfriend
- Ponnamma Babu as Gauri's mother
- Molly Kannamaly as Ammachy
- Pauly Valsan as Fish Seller
- Mareena Michael as Angel
- Asif Ali as Faizal (extended cameo)
- Akanksha Puri as Gauri, Amar's girlfriend (Cameo)
- Ineya as Item Dancer (Cameo)
- Vishnu Unnikrishnan as Rogue Man (Cameo)
- Bibin George as Furniture Shop Employee (Cameo)
- Abdul Majeed as Pizza Shop Manager (Cameo)
- Sujith Vasudev as himself (Cameo)
- Thesni Khan as Nurse
- K.T.S. Padannayil as Patient
- Nandhu Pothuval as Swami
- Sagar Shiyas as man at the mall
- Eloor George as Man At Cycle
- Kalabhavan Haneef as thattukada owner
- Sajan Palluruthy as man at theatre
- Harisree Yousuf as Kulukki Sarbath shop owner

== Production ==
Nadirshah made his successful debut with Amar Akbar Anthony. Mimicry artists, script writers along with Bibin and Vishnu completed the film screenplay in three years. They told the script to Nadirshah they knew for a long time. At listening to the script, Nadirshah showed interest.

The film was originally scheduled for 70 days with an estimated budget of ₹7 crore (US$730,000). However, it was completed in 65 days with an approximate production cost ₹6 crore (US$620,000).

== Remake ==
The film was remade in Kannada as John Jani Janardhan.

== Release ==
The film was released on 16 October 2015 in India. The television satellite was sold to Surya TV. Sony Music India released the trailer on 5 October 2015. One day before the official release, its trailer was leaked on the video sharing website YouTube on 4 October which was later removed by the website. The trailer was viewed by the two lakh viewers in just two days.

=== Critical reception ===
International Business Times rated the film by 4/5. The film also revolves around the social issues and how to deal it. Sify.com stated that "How much you enjoy Amar Akbar Anthony will depend on your liking for loud, verbal comedy. Even if you are not a great fan of such jokes, this film can keep you entertained." Filmibeat rated the film 3 out of 5 calling it "comical extravaganza" The reviewer also noted that the film is indeed a good one that revolves around both comedy and social issues. . Malayala Manorama, a morning newspaper in Malayalam published from Kottayam, Kerala, rated 3 out of 5. According to the company, "As the film tries to capture everything in the running time. Nadhirshah skilfully maintains a pace in the plot and effortlessly switches between fillers, comedy and thriller, like a seasoned director".

=== Box office ===
At Kerala, the film earned ₹5.10 crore (US$530,000) in 3 days and ₹52 lakhs from the rest of the other Indian states. It earned more than ₹11.20 crore within 8 days of its official release with a net amount of ₹9.02 crore. During the first 14 days, it claimed to have made ₹16.3 crore and ₹22.6 crore (US$2.3 million) in 21 days. The film collected approximately ₹28.5 crore (US$3.0 million) from the worldwide cinemas in 45 days. The film collected ₹50 crore from Worldwide box office in its final run. The film was played for over 100 days in Indian theatres.

== Music ==
Amar Akbar Anthony

Film score by Nadirshah
- Released: 9 October 2015
- Genre: Film soundtrack
- Label: Sony Music
- Producer: Nadirshah

Nadirshah chronology
Sringaravelan (2013)	Amar Akbar Anthony (2015)	Kattappanayile Rithwik Roshan' (2016)

The audios were officially launched by Nivin Pauly and Dileep at an event which was organised by the filmmakers at Kochi on 9 October.

The first MP4 song "Premamennal" sung by Prithviraj Sukumaran, Indrajith Sukumaran, Jayasurya and Kalabhavan Shajon was released on 14 October by Sony Music India. The song "Yenno Njanente" featuring Baby Meenakshi is sung by Sreya Jayadeep was released on 22 October. The romantic song "Manjaadum" lyrics are written in Malayalam, Hindi and Tamil.

Amar Akbar Anthony
No.	Title	Lyrics	Singer(s)	Length
1.	"Premamennaal"	Nadirshah	Nadirshah, Prithviraj, Indrajith, Jayasurya, Kalabhavan Shajon	5:30
2.	"Manjaadum"	Santhosh Varma	Nadirshah, Vijay Yesudas, Afsal, Samad	4:25
3.	"Yenno Njaanende"	Bapu Vavad	Nadirshah, Baby Sreya	3:47
4.	"Pranayam"	Nadirshah	Nadirshah	4:34
5.	"Premamennaal (Reprise)"	Nadirshah	Nadirshah	5:30

== Awards ==
The film won the following awards:

Kerala State Film Awards

- Special Jury Mention - Baby Sreya

== Legacy ==
Ramesh Pisharody reiterate his character Nallavanaya Unni in 2019 Malayalam film Pattabhiraman.
