= Vishnu Unnikrishnan =

Indian actor and screenwriter

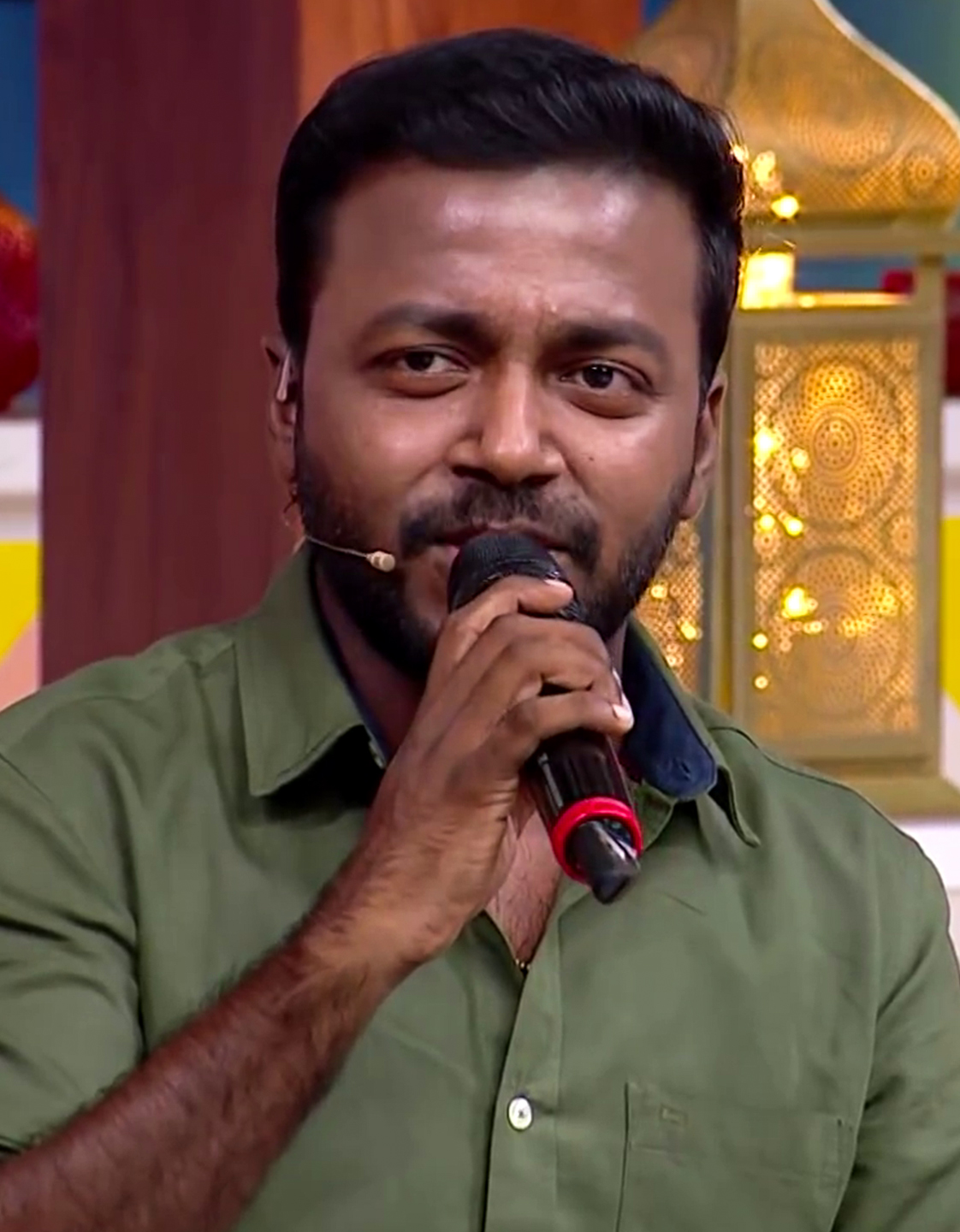
- Born: 11 March 1987 (age 39); Ernakulam, Kerala, India
- Occupations: Film actor; screenwriter
- Years active: 2003–present
- Spouse: Aiswarya (m. 2020)
- Parent(s): Unnikrishnan (Father), Leela Unnikrishnan (Mother)

Vishnu Unnikrishnan (born 11 March 1987) is an Indian actor and screenwriter, who works in Malayalam film industry.

== Early and personal life ==
He was born to Unnikrishnan and Leela on 11 March 1987 in Ernakulam, Kerala, India. He has two sisters, Lakshmi Priya and Reshmi.

== Career ==
He made his film debut in the Malayalam film Ente Veedu Appuvinteyum, directed by Sibi Malayil in 2003. Since then, he has acted in numerous films. In 2015, he debuted as a screenwriter by co-writing the film Amar Akbar Anthony with Bibin George, directed by Nadirshah. In the following year, he acted in the leading role in Kattappanayile Rithwik Roshan which he co-wrote with Bibin George and was directed by Nadirshah. During the filming of the movie Street Lights his second movie in a major role he suffered an injury to his right hand which left his hand almost paralysed for months. After regular physiotherapy he recovered in a few months time to get back to do his next project Shikkari Shambhu.

== Filmography ==
=== Film ===
| Year | Title | Role | Notes |
|---|---|---|---|
| 2003 | Ente Veedu Appuvinteyum | Juvenile Home Inmate | Child artist |
| 2004 | Rappakal | boy who buys aanaval | Child artist |
| 2004 | Amrutham | Akash Nath | Child artist |
| 2006 | Palunku | Asalappan | Child artist |
| 2007 | Kadha Parayumbol | Tuition student | Child artist |
| 2007 | Mayavi | Boy at Shop | Child artist |
| 2012 | Pottas Bomb | | Uncredited |
| 2012 | Asuravithu | Don Bosco's friend | |
| 2012 | Matinee | Najeeb's friend | |
| 2012 | Bhoomiyude Avakashikal | | |
| 2012 | Bachelor Party | Young Ayyappan | |
| 2013 | Proprietors: Kammath & Kammath | Young Thief | |
| 2014 | Iyobinte Pusthakam | Young Iyob | |
| 2014 | Parankimala | | |
| 2014 | Ponnaryan | | |
| 2015 | Aana Mayil Ottakam | | |
| 2015 | Amar Akbar Anthony | Colony Boy in Bike | Also screenwriter |
| 2016 | Out of Range | Subru | |
| 2016 | Vanyam | Vivek | |
| 2016 | Kattappanayile Hrithik Roshan | Krishnan Nair | Also screenwriter |
| 2017 | Tarangam | Devotee of god | Voice only |
| 2018 | Shikkari Shambhu | Achu | |
| 2018 | Vikadakumaran | Binu | |
| 2018 | Oru Pazhaya Bomb Kadha | Unnikrishnan | Cameo |
| 2018 | Nithyaharitha Nayakan | Sajimon | |
| 2019 | Neeyum Njanum | Ganapathi | |
| 2019 | Oru Yamandan Premakadha | Teny Sebastian | Also screenwriter |
| 2019 | Children's Park | Jerry | |
| 2019 | Margamkali | | Cameo |
| 2020 | Big Brother | Khani | |
| 2020 | Break The Chain | Superman Suni | Short film |
| 2021 | Krishnankutty Pani Thudangi | Unnikannnan | |
| 2022 | Randu | Vava | |
| 2022 | Kuri | | |
| 2022 | Sabhash Chandra Bose | Chandra Bose | |
| 2023 | Vedikettu | Shibuttan | Also co-director. |
| 2023 | Kallanum Bhagavathiyum | Maathappan | |
| 2023 | Dance Party | | |
| 2024 | Idiyan Chandhu | Chandhu | |
| 2024 | Thaanara | Thankachan | |
| 2025 | A Pan Indian Story | | |
| 2026 | Magic Mushrooms | Ayon Jose | |
| 2026 | Bhishmar | Aravindan / Sulthan | |
| 2026 | Revolver Rinko | Priyesh | |
| 2026 | Disco | Bixon | |
| 2026 | Ottam Thullal † | TBA | |
| TBA | Red River † | Balu | Post-production |

== Accolades ==
- Won: 19th Asianet Film Awards for Best Script - Kattappanayile Hrithik Roshan
- Won: Vanitha Film Awards for Best Debut (Male) - Kattappanayile Hrithik Roshan
- Nominated: SIIMA Best Debut Male - Malayalam
