= 48th Kerala State Film Awards =

Annual Indian film awards ceremony

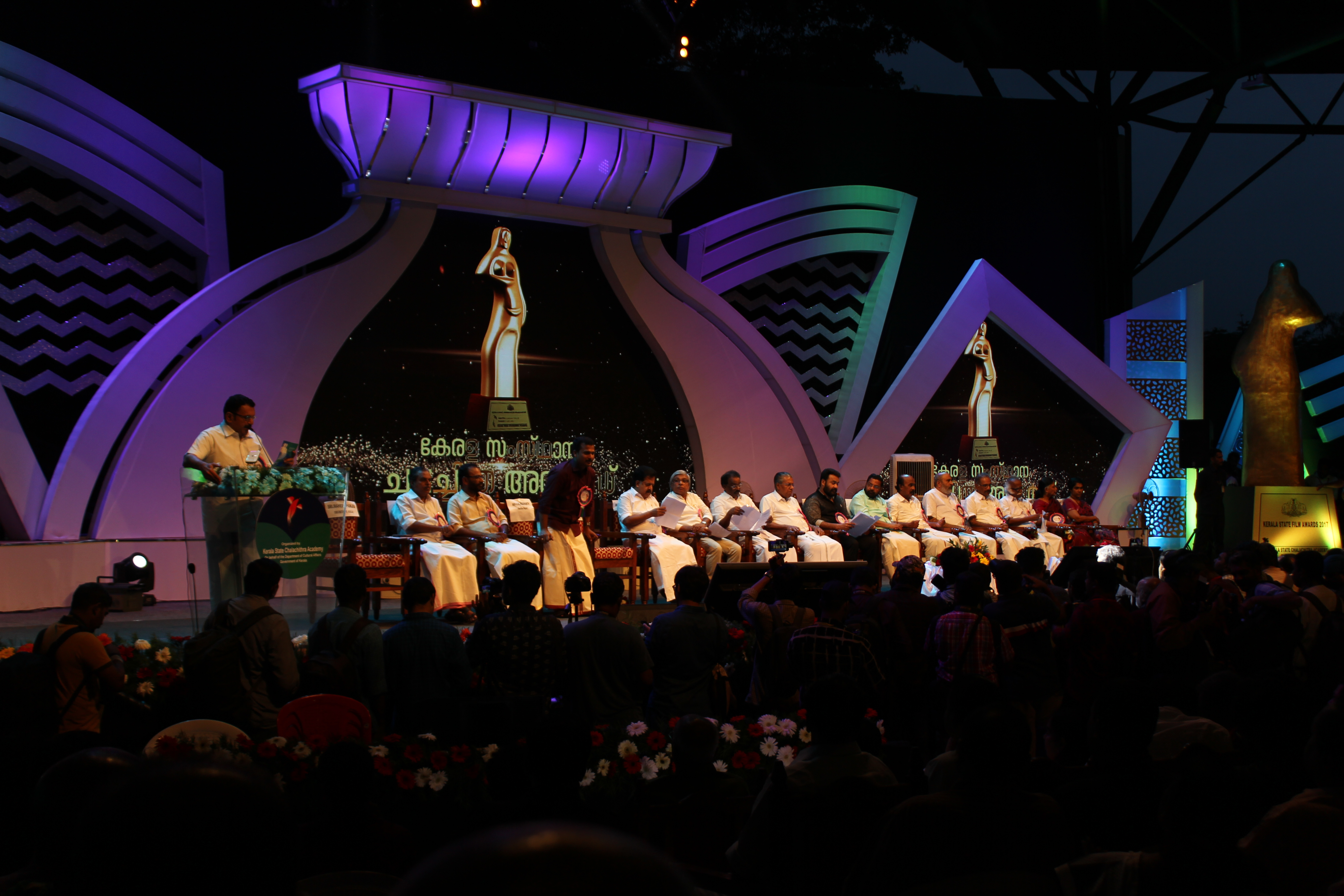
- 48th Kerala State Film awards function in Thiruvananthapuram
- Awarded for: Honouring achievements in Malayalam films
- Date: 8 March 2018
- Location: Thiruvananthapuram
- Country: India
- Presented by: Kerala State Chalachitra Academy
- First award: 1969

Highlights
- Most wins: Take Off (5)
- Website: http://www.keralafilm.com

The 48th Kerala State Film Awards, presented by the Kerala State Chalachitra Academy, were announced by A. K. Balan, the state Minister for Cultural Affairs, in Thiruvananthapuram on 8 March 2018.

== Writing category ==
=== Jury ===
• P. K. Rajasekharan (chairman)
• Oleena A. G.	• P. Soman
• Mahesh Panju (member and secretary)

=== Awards ===
All award recipients receive a cash prize, certificate and statuette.

Name of award	Title of work	Awardee(s)	Cash prize
Best Book on Cinema	Cinema Kaanum Deshangal	V. Mohanakrishnan	₹30,000
Best Article on Cinema	Realisathinte Yadharthyangal	A. Chandrasekhar	₹20,000

=== Special Jury Mention ===
All recipients receive a certificate and statuette.

Name of award	Title of work	Awardee(s)	Type of work
Special Mention	Vellithirayile 'Laingikatha' Kamanakalude/Kambolathinte Rashtriyam	Resmi G. Anil Kumar K. S.	Article

== Film category ==
=== Jury ===
• T. V. Chandran (chairman)
• Dr. Biju	• Manoj Kana
• Vivek Sachidanand	• Santosh Thundiyil
• Jerry Amaldev	• Cheriyan Kalpakavadi
• M. Rajeev Kumar	• Jalaja
• Mahesh Panju (member and secretary)

=== Awards ===
All award recipients receive a cash prize, certificate and statuette.

Name of award	Title of film	Awardee(s)	Cash prize
Best Film	Ottamuri Velicham	Director: Rahul Riji Nair	₹200,000
Best Film	Ottamuri Velicham	Producer: Rahul R. Nair	₹200,000
Second Best Film	Aedan	Director: Sanju Surendran	₹150,000
Second Best Film	Aedan	Producer: Murali Mattummal	₹150,000
Best Director	Ee.Ma.Yau	Lijo Jose Pellissery	₹200,000
Best Actor	Aalorukkam	Indrans	₹100,000
Best Actress	Take Off	Parvathy	₹100,000
Best Character Actor	Thondimuthalum Driksakshiyum	Alencier Ley Lopez	₹50,000
Best Character Actress	Ee.Ma.Yau; Ottamuri Velicham	Pauly Valsan	₹50,000
Best Child Artist	Swanam	Abhinand (male category)	₹50,000
Best Child Artist	Rakshadhikari Baiju Oppu	Nakshatra (female category)	₹50,000
Best Story	Kinar	M. A. Nishad	₹50,000
Best Cinematography	Aedan	Manesh Madhavan	₹50,000
Best Screenplay	Thondimuthalum Driksakshiyum	Sajeev Pazhoor	₹50,000
Best Screenplay (Adaptation)	Aedan	S. Hareesh	₹25,000
Best Screenplay (Adaptation)	Aedan	Sanju Surendran	₹25,000
Best Lyrics	Clint ("Oolathil Melathal")	Prabha Varma	₹50,000
Best Music Director (song)	Bhayanakam	M. K. Arjunan	₹50,000
Best Music Director (score)	Take Off	Gopi Sundar	₹50,000
Best Male Singer	Mayaanadhi ("Mizhiyil Ninnum")	Shahabaz Aman	₹50,000
Best Female Singer	Vimaanam ("Vaanamakalunnuvo")	Sithara Krishnakumar	₹50,000
Best Film Editor	Ottamuri Velicham; Veeram	Appu Bhattathiri	₹50,000
Best Art Director	Take Off	Santhosh Raman	₹50,000
Best Sync Sound	Rakshadhikari Baiju Oppu	Smijith Kumar P. B.	₹50,000
Best Sound Mixing	Aedan	Pramod Thomas	₹50,000
Best Sound Design	Ee.Ma.Yau	Renganaath Ravee	₹50,000
Best Processing Lab/Colourist	Bhayanakam	Chitranjali Studio/R. Muthuraj	₹50,000
Best Makeup Artist	Take Off	Ranjith Ambady	₹50,000
Best Costume Designer	Hey Jude	Sakhi Elsa	₹50,000
Best Dubbing Artist	Theeram (character: Ali)	Achu Arun Kumar	₹50,000
Best Dubbing Artist	Eeda (character: Aishwarya)	Sneha M.	₹50,000
Best Choreography	Hey Jude	Prasanna Sujit	₹50,000
Best Film with Popular Appeal and Aesthetic Value	Rakshadhikari Baiju Oppu	Producer: 100th Monkey Movies	₹100,000
Best Film with Popular Appeal and Aesthetic Value	Rakshadhikari Baiju Oppu	Director: Ranjan Pramod	₹100,000
Best Debut Director	Take Off	Mahesh Narayan	₹100,000
Best Children's Film	Swanam	Producer: Ramya Raghavan	₹300,000
Best Children's Film	Swanam	Director: Deepesh T.	₹100,000
Special Jury Award	Ottamuri Velicham	Vinitha Koshy (awarded for acting)	₹50,000

=== Special Jury Mention ===
All recipients receive a certificate and statuette.

Name of award	Title of film	Awardee(s)	Awarded for
Special Mention	Hey Jude	Vijay Menon	Acting
Special Mention	Lalibela	Master Ashanth K. Shah	Acting
Special Mention	Athishayangalude Venal	Master Chandrakiran G. K.	Acting
Special Mention	Mannamkattayum Kariyilayum	Joby A. S.	Acting
