= CPC Cine Awards =

Malayalam film industry annual awards

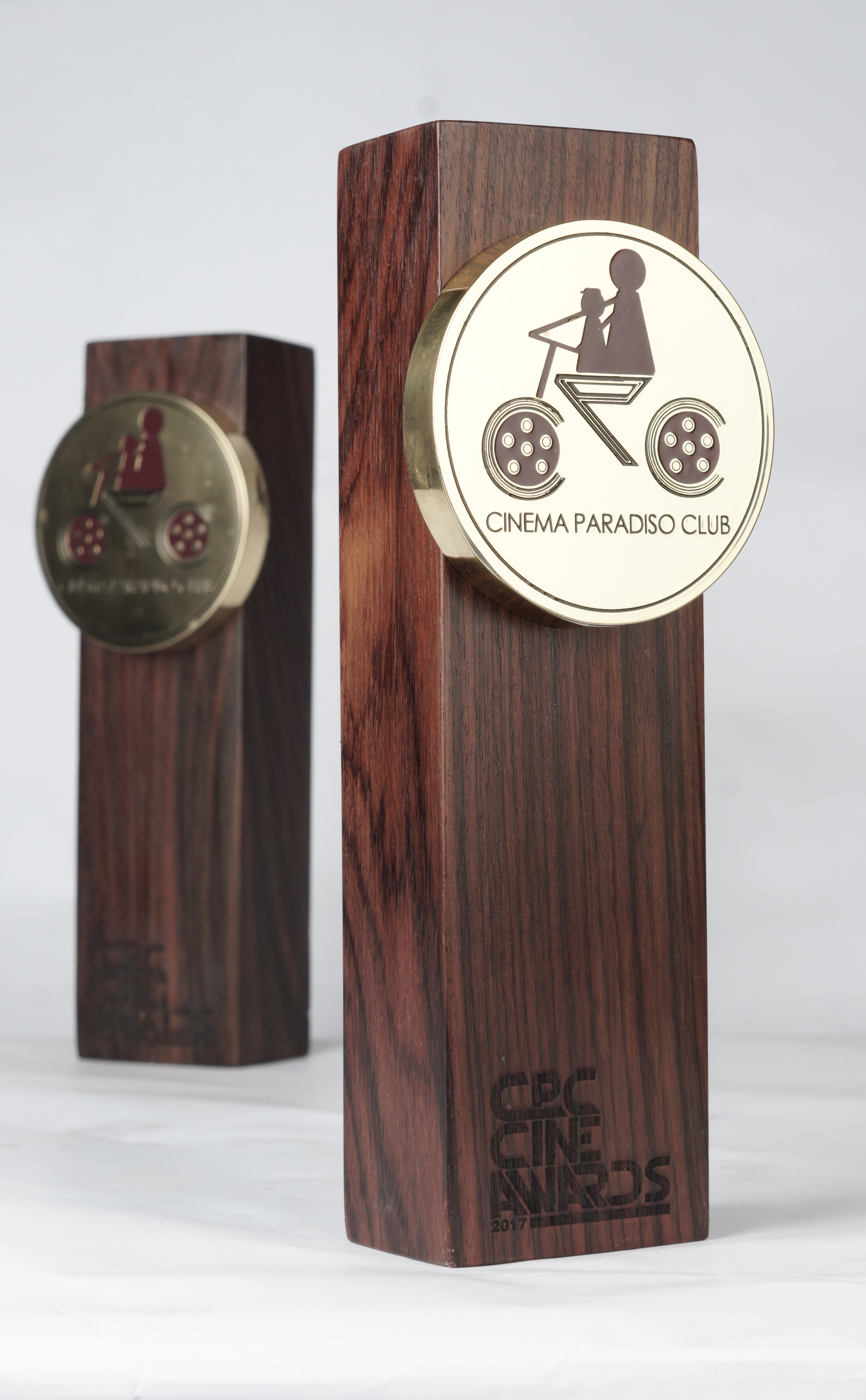
- Awarded for: Excellence in cinematic achievements in Malayalam Cinema
- Country: India
- Presented by: Cinema Paradiso Club
- First award: 9 March 2016; 10 years ago

List of frequent winners
- Artist: Wins
Syam Pushkaran	3
Parvathy Thiruvothu	2
Shyju Khalid	2
Lijo Jose Pellissery	2
Vinayakan	2
Girish Gangadharan	2
Renganaath Ravee	2
Sushin Shyam	2

CPC Cine Awards was an annual awards ceremony for films in the Malayalam film industry, which was crowd-sourced and hosted by a Facebook group named Cinema Paradiso Club.

== History ==
Cinema Paradiso Club, also known as CPC, was formed by a group of cinephiles in the year 2010 in Kerala, India. The first crowd-sourced CPC Cine Awards was announced in 2016 for the films released in 2015 in the Malayalam film industry. The winners were decided by a combination of votes from members of a Facebook group and a jury. CPC Cine Awards 2017 had a change in the polling system, that the poll was open to the public. The 2017 winners were declared and announced to the public on 27 January 2018 CPC Cine Awards 2018 winners were declared on 28 January 2019 and distributed at a ceremony on 17 February 2019 at IMA House, Kochi

== Awards ceremonies ==
CPC Cine Awards 2015 had no official ceremony. The 2016 award ceremony was held on 19 February 2017 at Cochin Palace Hotel, Kochi. Since it was a crowd sourced event, the program did not invite much media attention initially. The reactions from award winners like Vinayakan, Rajisha Vijayan, Indrans, Manikandan R Achari, Dileesh Pothan, Syam Pushkaran etc. made the news and as such awards received some media attention. CPC Cine Awards 2017 award ceremony was held on 18 February 2018 at IMA House, Kochi. The event's major draw was honouring veteran filmmaker K G George. He was draped with a ‘ponnada’(shawl) by filmmakers Sathyan Anthikad, Sibi Malayil and Kamal. Also a documentary film by the name '8 ½ Intercuts – Life and Films of K G George' that was based on the life and career of KG George was screened at the event. CPC Cine Awards 2018 award ceremony was held on 17 February 2019 at IMA House, Kochi. In the event, the senior stunt master Thyagarajan was honored with Special Honorary Award. He was draped with a ‘ponnada’(shawl) by actor Joju George and scriptwriter P. F. Mathews. The CPC Cine Awards 2019 award ceremony was held on 16 February 2020 at IMA House, Kochi . In the event, the two film production houses Udaya Studios, Merryland Studios were honored with Special Honorary Award

== Winners ==
=== CPC Cine Awards 2024 (Sixth Edition) ===
List of winners
Award	Recipient(s)	Film(s)
Best Movie	S. Sashikanth,Chakravarthy Ramachandra, Joby George Thadathil	Bramayugam,Kishkindha Kaandam
Best Director	Chidambaram S. Poduval	Manjummel Boys
Best Screenplay	Bahul Ramesh	Kishkindha Kaandam
Best Actor in a Lead Role	Asif Ali	Kishkindha Kaandam
Best Actress in a Lead Role	Urvashi	Ullozhukku
Best Actor in a Character Role	Sajin Gopu	Aavesham
Best Actress in a Character Role	Akhila Bhargavan	Premalu
Best Cinematographer	Madhu Neelakandan	Malaikottai Vaaliban
Best Original Song	Angu Vaana Konilu ( Dhibu Ninan Thomas, Manu Manjith, Vaikom Vijayalakshmi)	Ajayante Randam Moshanam
Best Background Score	Sushin Shyam	Manjummel Boys, Aavesham
Best Editor	Vivek Harshan	Manjummel Boys, Aavesham
Best Production Design	Ajayan Chalissery	Manjummel Boys
Best Sound Design	Jayadevan Chakkadath	Bramayugam
Best Costume Design	Mashar Hamsa	Aavesham
Best Web Series	1000 Babies	Shaji Nadesan, Arya
Special Honorary Award	Sreenivasan	

=== CPC Cine Awards 2019 ===
List of winners
Award	Recipient(s)	Film(s)
Best Movie	Fahad Fazil, Nazriya Nazim, Dileesh Pothan, Syam Pushkaran	Kumbalangi Nights
Best Director	Aashiq Abu	Virus
Best Screenplay	Syam Pushkaran	Kumbalangi Nights
Best Actor in a Lead Role	Suraj Venjaramood	Android Kunjappan Version 5.25, Vikruthi, Driving License, Finals
Best Actress in a Lead Role	Anna Ben	Helen
Best Actor in a Character Role	Roshan Mathew	Moothon
Best Actress in a Character Role	Grace Antony	Kumbalangi Nights
Best Cinematographer	Girish Gangadharan	Jallikkattu
Best Original Song	Cherathukal (Sushin Shyam, Anwar Ali, Sithara Krishnakumar)	Kumbalangi Nights
Best Background Score	Sushin Shyam	Kumbalangi Nights, Virus
Best Editor	Saiju Sreedharan	Kumbalangi Nights, Virus
Best Production Design	Jothish Shankar	Kumbalangi Nights, Virus
Best Sound Design	Renganaath Ravee	Jallikkattu
Special Honorary Award	Udaya Studios, Merryland Studios	

=== CPC Cine Awards 2018 ===
List of winners
Award	Recipient(s)	Film(s)
Best Actor in a Lead Role	Joju George	Joseph
Best Actress in a Lead Role	Aishwarya Lekshmi	Varathan
Best Director	Lijo Jose Pellissery	Ee.Ma.Yau
Best Original Song	Ranam Title Track	Ranam
Best Background Score	Prashant Pillai	Ee.Ma.Yau
Best Cinematographer	Shyju Khalid	Ee.Ma.Yau, Sudani From Nigeria
Best Editor	Noufal Abdullah	Sudani From Nigeria
Best Sound Design	Renganaath Ravee	Ee.Ma.Yau
Best Actor in a Character Role	Vinayakan	Ee.Ma.Yau
Best Actress in a Character Role	Savitri Sreedharan, Pauly Wilson	Sudani From Nigeria, Ee.Ma.Yau
Best Script Writer	Zakariya Mohammed, Muhsin Parari	Sudani From Nigeria
Best Movie	Sameer Thahir, Shyju Khalid	Sudani From Nigeria
Special Honorary Award	B Thyagarajan	—

=== CPC Cine Awards 2017 ===
List of winners
Award	Recipient(s)	Film(s)
Best Actor in a Lead Role	Fahadh Faasil	Thondimuthalum Driksakshiyum
Best Actress in a Lead Role	Parvathy Thiruvothu	Take Off
Best Director	Lijo Jose Pellissery	Angamaly Diaries
Best Music Director	Rex Vijayan	Parava, Mayaanadhi
Best Cinematographer	Rajeev Ravi, Girish Gangadharan	Thondimuthalum Driksakshiyum, Angamaly Diaries
Best Editor	Kiran Das	Thondimuthalum Driksakshiyum
Best Actor in a Character Role	Alencier Ley Lopez	Thondimuthalum Driksakshiyum
Best Actress in a Character Role	Krishna Padmakumar	Rakshadhikari Baiju Oppu
Best Script Writer	Sajeev Pazhoor, Shyam Pushkaran	Thondimuthalum Driksakshiyum
Best Movie	Sandip Senan, Aneesh M Thomas	Thondimuthalum Driksakshiyum
Special Honorary Award	K. G. George	—

=== CPC Cine Awards 2016 ===
List of winners
Award	Recipient(s)	Film(s)
Best Actor	Vinayakan	Kammatipaadam
Best Actress	Rajisha Vijayan, Sai Pallavi	Anuraga Karikkin Vellam, Kali
Best Director	Dileesh Pothan	Maheshinte Prathikaaram
Best Music Director	Bijibal	Maheshinte Prathikaaram
Best Cinematographer	Shyju Khalid	Maheshinte Prathikaaram
Best Supporting Actor	Manikandan Achari	Kammatipaadam
Best Supporting Actress	Rohini	Action Hero Biju, Guppy
Best Script Writer	Shyam Pushkaran	Maheshinte Prathikaaram
Best Movie	Aashiq Abu	Maheshinte Prathikaaram
Special Honorary Award	Indrans	—

=== CPC Cine Awards 2015 ===
List of winners
Award	Recipient(s)	Film(s)
Best Actor	Prithviraj Sukumaran	Ennu Ninte Moideen
Best Actress	Parvathy Thiruvothu	Ennu Ninte Moideen
Best Movie Sound Track	Rajesh Murugesan	Premam
Best Cinematographer	Madhu Neelakandan	Rani Padmini
Best Character Actor	Tovino Thomas	Ennu Ninte Moideen
Best Character Actress	Zeenath	Alif
Best Movie	Alphonse Puthren	Premam

== Criticism ==
=== Controversies ===
CPC Cine Awards 2018 was criticized for not including actors Dileep and Alencier Ley Lopez in the final nominations. The club had declared the removal of these actors from the 2018 awards with respect to their alleged involvement in serious abuse cases against certain women co-actors which awaited court judgment.
