= Ee.Ma.Yau. =

- Theatrical release poster
- Directed by: Lijo Jose Pellissery
- Screenplay by: P. F. Mathews
- Based on: Chaavunilam by P. F. Mathews
- Produced by: Aashiq Abu; Rajesh George Kulangara
- Starring: Kainakary Thankaraj; Chemban Vinod Jose; Vinayakan; Dileesh Pothan; Arya Salim
- Cinematography: Shyju Khalid
- Edited by: Deepu S. Joseph
- Music by: Prashant Pillai
- Production companies: OPM Cinemas; RGK Cinemas
- Distributed by: OPM Cinemas Release
- Release date: 4 May 2018
- Running time: 120 minutes
- Country: India
- Language: Malayalam

Ee.Ma.Yau. (Malayalam: ഈ.മ.യൗ.) (Note: Ee.Ma.Yau is the abbreviation of "Eesho Mariyam Yauseppu" meaning "Jesus, Mary and Joseph" in Malayalam) is a 2018 Indian Malayalam-language independent tragedy film directed by Lijo Jose Pellissery and written by P. F. Mathews. It stars Vinayakan, Chemban Vinod Jose, Pauly Valsan, Bitto Davis, Kainakary Thankaraj, Dileesh Pothan and Arya Salim in the main roles. The film had its premiere on 30 November 2017 and was theatrically released on 4 May 2018. The film revolves around the death and funeral of an older man from the Latin Catholic community in Chellanam, Ernakulam district. Lijo Jose Pellissery won the Best Director Award at the 48th Kerala State Film Awards for Ee.Ma.Yau. The film won the Silver Peacock-Best Director and Best Actor (Chemban Vinod Jose) awards at the 49th International Film Festival of India. It also won two awards at the International Film Festival of Kerala viz. the NETPAC Award for Best Asian film in Competition and the Golden Crow Pheasant Award for the best director. It was included in The Hindu's top 25 Malayalam films of the decade and is widely regarded as one of the defining movies of the New Wave Movement.

== Plot ==
Set in Chellanam, a coastal village with significant fishermen population in Ernakulam, the film revolves around the death of Vavachan mestri. After returning from a long journey, Vavachan gets into a fight with Chowro after Chowro informs and shames Vavachan regarding a premarital relationship between his daughter Nissa and Sivanapan. Somewhere on the beach, in a shack, two people are playing a game of cards, lamenting over having to leave as the game is getting interesting. On arriving home, his wife Pennamma asks him to stop going around and settle down. When his son Eeshi returns home, Vavachan drinks and tells him that Vavachan's father had the most splendid funeral in all of Chellanam. Eeshi promises that Vavachan will also have a big grand funeral. After some time, Vavachan falls to the ground and dies.

Eeshi's wife Sabeth informs neighbors about the death. Ayappan, the Panchayath ward member and Eeshi's friend arrives at the scene and takes control. Ayyappan asks Paanji and Lasar, two neighbours of Eeshi, to bring Dr. Gervasius to confirm the death. But Gervasius's wife tells them that he is drunk and asleep and they have to go to a head nurse living nearby to confirm the death. Arriving at the scene and seeing the injury in head, nurse tells them that she cannot do anything and only a doctor can confirm. Fr. Zacharia Parapurath, a rude vicar of the parish and a crime novel enthusiast hears about the head injury and informs the police.

The next day, another wife of Vavachan arrives with her son and family and claims rights for the body. This leads to a clash between two wives and the families. The family of the second wife alleges that Eeshi and family murdered Vavachan and they want justice. Fr. Zacharia, who is interested in finding mishap surrounding the death, tells Eeshi that he won't allow burial of Vavachan unless there is a proper investigation and autopsy. On hearing this unintelligent requirement from the vicar, a furious Eeshi slaps Fr. Zacharia, and Fr. Zacharia out of vengeance and shame declares that he will not conduct or allow the burial in church cemetery. The gravedigger, who was digging the grave for Vavachan dies suddenly and his burial takes place in the same grave he dug for Vavachan. The two guys earlier shown to be playing cards, are still playing in the morning also and discuss that how the situation has become complicated and that now things will fall in place. Ayyappan goes to police station to seek the help of circle inspector to clear the clouds. Inspector comes to Eeshi's house and tells that there is no crime element in the death and concurs with Dr. Gervasius's opinion. They lament Fr. Zacharia's attitude to matters of humanity. Since there is no positive confirmation from the Vicar about the burial, the morning rain, and all the problems that is going on Eeshi decides to take matters into his own hands.

Eeshi digs a grave in his courtyard and forcefully makes everyone move-out from the courtyard, locks his family inside home. Finally asks his father's forgiveness for not fulfilling his wishes and buries him. Everyone who came for the funeral stands in the rain and looks at him with remorse and reverence.

In the mid-credits scene, we see the corpse of the dog that would accompany the grave-digger everywhere. And in the far away horizon of the sea we see two boats with lit lanterns and people dressed in cloaks, approaching the beach. It's revealed that the two men playing cards from the beginning of the movie, were in fact Angels who had come over to the beach to carry forward the souls of Vavachan, the mallard, the gravedigger and the dog to their respective destinations; Hell and Heaven.

== Cast ==
- Kainakary Thankaraj as Valiyathuparambil Vavachan Mesthiri
- Chemban Vinod Jose as Eeshi, Vavachan's son
- Vinayakan as Ayyappan, Eeshi's friend
- Pauly Valsan as Pennamma (Mariam Thressia), Vavachan's wife
- Dileesh Pothan as Fr. Zacharia Parappurathu (Vicar)
- Arya Salim as Elisabeth (Sabeth), Eeshi's wife
- Bitto Davis as Paanji
- Krishna P. as Nissa (Agnissa)
- Kunjunju as Chowro
- Sudarshanan as Manikan
- Anson as C.I. Mathen
- Liji as Karuthamolly

== Production ==
The film's title is an abbreviation of "Eesho Mariyam Yauseppe", which in some Christian communities, is a prayer, especially whispered in the ears of the deceased. The film, a satire, is set in the coastal village of Chellanam in Kochi and the story revolves around the death of Vavachan Mesthiri. Filming began in August 2017. Originally planned to shoot in 35 days, the film was completed in 18 days. Besides the main cast, most of the supporting roles were played by newcomers from Chellanam area. The film was produced by Rajesh George Kulangara, but later director-producer Aashiq Abu bought the complete rights of the film.

== Release ==
Ee.Ma.Yau had a preview screening on 30 November 2017. The film, originally planned to release theatrically soon after the preview, was postponed to next year for undisclosed reasons. The film was released on 4 May 2018.

=== Critical reception ===
Nirmal Jovial of The Week says that Ee.Ma.Yau will certainly be counted among the classics of Malayalam cinema. Navamy Sudhish of The Hindu praises PF Mathews' screenplay and calls director Lijo Jose Pellissery and cinematographer Shyju Khalid as the heroes of the film. Gokul M. G. of Deccan Chronicle calls Ee.Ma.Yau as one of the finest films in Mollywood in a very long time. He also added that nobody is leaving without shedding a drop of tear or without a heavy heart. Film critic Veeyen, was all praise for the film, rated the film 'Excellent' and wrote that "..With ‘Ee.Ma.Yau’ Lijo Jose Pellissery surpasses himself, asserts once and for all that he's a master craftsman who astutely sees his dough even in a theme that is as stiff and unmalleable as a corpse (pun intended), and crafts a chimerical ode to mortality. Baradwaj Rangan of Film Companion South called it "A laugh-out-loud, yet deep, meditation on death and faith that's a masterclass in writing" in his review

== Accolades ==
Award (Note: Awards, festivals and organizations are in alphabetical order.)	Date of ceremony (Note: Date is linked to the article about the awards held that year, wherever possible.)	Category	Recipient(s)	Result	Ref.
Asianet Film Awards	6–7 April 2019	Best Film	Aashiq Abu, Rajesh George Kulangara	Nominated	
Asianet Film Awards	6–7 April 2019	Best Director	Lijo Jose Pellissery	Won	
Asianet Film Awards	6–7 April 2019	Best Screenplay	P. F. Mathews	Nominated	
Asiavision Awards	16 February 2019	Best Director	Lijo Jose Pellissery	Won	
CPC Cine Awards	17 February 2019	Best Director	Lijo Jose Pellissery	Won	
CPC Cine Awards	17 February 2019	Best Background Score	Prashant Pillai	Won	
CPC Cine Awards	17 February 2019	Best Cinematographer	Shyju Khalid	Won	
CPC Cine Awards	17 February 2019	Best Sound Design	Renganaath Ravee	Won	
CPC Cine Awards	17 February 2019	Best Character Actor – Male	Vinayakan	Won	
CPC Cine Awards	17 February 2019	Best Character Actor – Female	Pauly Valsan	Won	
Film Critics Circle of India	2019	Best Indian Film of 2018	Ee.Ma.Yau. – Lijo Jose Pellissery	Won	
Filmfare Awards South	21 December 2019	Best Film – Malayalam	Ee.Ma.Yau. – Aashiq Abu, Rajesh George Kulangara	Nominated	
Filmfare Awards South	21 December 2019	Best Director – Malayalam	Lijo Jose Pellissery	Won	
Filmfare Awards South	21 December 2019	Best Actor – Malayalam	Chemban Vinod Jose	Nominated	
Filmfare Awards South	21 December 2019	Best Supporting Actor – Malayalam	Vinayakan	Won	
Filmfare Awards South	21 December 2019	Best Supporting Actress – Malayalam	Pauly Valsan	Nominated	
International Film Festival of India	20–28 November 2018	Best Director	Lijo Jose Pellissery	Won	
International Film Festival of India	20–28 November 2018	Best Actor (Male)	Chemban Vinod Jose	Won	
International Film Festival of Kerala	7–13 December 2018	The Silver Crow Pheasant Award for the Best Director	Lijo Jose Pellissery	Won	
International Film Festival of Kerala	7–13 December 2018	NETPAC Award: Best Asian Film	Ee.Ma.Yau. – Lijo Jose Pellissery	Won	
Kerala State Film Awards	8 March 2018	Best Director	Lijo Jose Pellissery	Won	
Kerala State Film Awards	8 March 2018	Best Character Actress	Pauly Valsan	Won	
Kerala State Film Awards	8 March 2018	Best Sound Design	Renganaath Ravee	Won	
South Indian International Movie Awards	15–16 August 2019	Best Film – Malayalam	Ee.Ma.Yau. – Aashiq Abu, Rajesh George Kulangara	Nominated	
South Indian International Movie Awards	15–16 August 2019	Best Director – Malayalam	Lijo Jose Pellissery	Nominated	
South Indian International Movie Awards	15–16 August 2019	Best Cinematographer – Malayalam	Shyju Khalid	Nominated	
South Indian International Movie Awards	15–16 August 2019	Best Actor in a Supporting Role – Malayalam	Dileesh Pothan	Nominated	
Toulouse Indian Film Festival	10–15 April 2019	Jury Award Best Film	Ee.Ma.Yau. – Lijo Jose Pellissery	Won	
Vanitha Film Awards	2 March 2019	Best Film	Ee.Ma.Yau. – Lijo Jose Pellissery	Won	
Vanitha Film Awards	2 March 2019	Best Director	Lijo Jose Pellissery	Won	
