= Keedam =

- Theatrical release poster
- Directed by: Rahul Riji Nair
- Produced by: Rahul Riji Nair; Sujith Warrier; Lijo Joseph; Ranjan
- Starring: Rajisha Vijayan; Sreenivasan; Manikandan Pattambi; Rahul Riji Nair
- Cinematography: Rakesh Dharan
- Edited by: Christy Sebastian
- Music by: Sidhartha Pradeep
- Production companies: First Print Studios; Fairy Frames Productions
- Distributed by: Capital Studioz
- Release date: 20 May 2022
- Running time: 106 minutes
- Country: India
- Language: Malayalam

Keedam (transl. Pest) is a 2022 Indian Malayalam-language thriller film directed by Rahul Riji Nair and starring Rajisha Vijayan and Sreenivasan. The film was released in theatres on 20 May 2022.

== Plot ==
Cybersecurity expert Radhika Balan's life turns chaotic when she falls prey to a cyberstalking incident. She decides to settle the score with the criminals.

== Cast ==
- Rajisha Vijayan as Radhika Balan
- Sreenivasan as Balan
- Rahul Riji Nair as Vijay
- Vijay Babu as CI Charles
- Manikandan Pattambi as Kuttettan
- Renjit Shekar Nair as Thurumbu Aji
- Anand Manmadhan as Zam
- Mahesh Nair as Kili Biju
- Arjun Ranjan as Muthu

== Production ==
The film's director, Rahul Riji Nair, previously directed the Sports Drama Kho-Kho starring Rajisha Vijayan. In this film, Rajisha Vijayan plays a cyber security expert.

== Music ==
The music rights of the film is owned by Saregama. The music of the film is composed by Sidhartha Pradeep. Lyrics are written by Vinayak Sasikumar, Neeraj Kumar and Mridul.

Tracklist
No.	Title	Lyrics	Singer(s)	Length
1.	"Kattu Thee"	Vinayak Sasikumar	Souparnika Rajagopal, Bindu Anirudhan	3:30
2.	"Subah"	Vinayak Sasikumar, Neeraj Kumar, Mridul	Amrita Jayakumar	3:03
Total length:				6:33

Extended soundtrack
No.	Title	Length
1.	"Murder on Road"	1:48
2.	"Radhika Kidnapped"	2:51
3.	"Intension or Purpose"	0:20
4.	"The Brutal Fight"	5:10
5.	"The New Beginning"	1:38
6.	"Father Daughter Theme 2"	0:28
7.	"Prostitute in Car"	2:09
8.	"The Hunt for the Hunter"	2:07
9.	"Radhika Kidnap Flashback"	1:04
10.	"Decoding Muthumani"	3:36
11.	"Balans Trauma"	2:51
12.	"Gold Smuggling Busted"	6:34
13.	"Keedam Theme 1"	0:31
14.	"Radhika Balan Theme"	0:19
15.	"Hacker Theme"	0:51
16.	"Hook Up for a Date"	0:18
17.	"Gold Unravels"	2:18
18.	"Have you Hacked your Wife"	0:45
19.	"Porn Message"	0:37
20.	"Are you Tracking Me"	0:34
21.	"Gang Internal Conflicts"	1:01
22.	"Kuttetan Radhika Face Off"	1:31
23.	"Police gets a Lead"	0:50
24.	"CCTV Case Solving"	1:28
25.	"Hacker Theme 2"	0:22
26.	"Stalking Radhika"	1:29
27.	"Secret Reveal"	0:50
28.	"Biju Thrash Talk"	0:22
29.	"Biju Second Call"	0:39
30.	"Biju Third Call"	0:13
31.	"Biju Fourth Call"	1:00
32.	"Murder Mystery Unfolds"	1:49
33.	"Intruder Identified by Criminals"	1:24
34.	"Social Engineering Theme"	0:48
35.	"Police Station Confrontation"	0:20
36.	"Ajith Phone Missing"	0:29
37.	"Unethical Hacking"	1:31
38.	"Radhika Tries to Call Balan"	0:24
39.	"Charles Confronts Aji and Biju"	0:33
40.	"Ajith in Police Station"	0:37
Total length:		54:11

== Release ==
=== Theatrical ===
The film was released in theatres on 20 May 2022.

=== Home media ===
The film was digitally streamed on ZEE5 from 1 July 2022. It is also available in Hindi & Marathi language dubbed versions currently streaming on Ultra Play & Ultra Jhakaas app respectively.

== Reception ==
=== Critical reception ===
S. R. Praveen of The Hindu opined that "Setting aside the ethical part, the movie can be viewed positively as one woman's valiant fightback, using her own tools, against a group of thugs who intrude into her personal space".

A critic from Manorama Online wrote that "Nevertheless, Keedam is a mirror on the invasion of privacy and the concerns arising from that portrayed through the prism of cybersecurity, though we wish it could pan a wider canvas".

Anna M.M. Vetticad of Firstpost said that "Keedam is, wisely, not prescriptive on the question of technology-driven vigilante justice, but it avoids addressing the complexities involved in the use of surveillance techniques including their misuse by the powers that be".

Cris of The News Minute stated that "Even though all the elements are there – a good cast, convincing villains, a setting that fits – the filmmaking falls inadequate".
