= Sachidanand =

Sachidanand is both a given name and a surname. Notable people with the name include:

- Vivek Sachidanand (born 1977), Indian sound designer, sound mixer, and recordist
- Sachidanand Sinha (1871–1950), Indian lawyer, parliamentarian, and journalist
