= Kho-Kho (2021 film) =

2021 sports film by Rahul Riji Nair

- Theatrical release poster
- Directed by: Rahul Riji Nair
- Written by: Rahul Riji Nair
- Produced by: First Print Studios
- Starring: Rajisha Vijayan; Mamitha Baiju
- Cinematography: Tobin Thomas
- Edited by: Christy Sebastian
- Music by: Sidhartha Pradeep
- Production company: First Print Studios
- Distributed by: Capital Studioz
- Release date: 14 April 2021
- Running time: 119 minutes
- Country: India
- Language: Malayalam

Kho-Kho is a 2021 Indian Malayalam-language sports drama film written and directed by Rahul Riji Nair starring Rajisha Vijayan, Mamitha Baiju and produced by First Print Studios. The film was released on 14 April 2021.

== Plot ==
The story revolves around Maria Francis, a school coach for the traditional South Asian sport kho kho. The film tells the story of the formation of a team of kho kho players in a school where only girls study and the events that follow. In the end, Maria is proud to learn that Anju, the most promising player of her former kho Kho school team has gotten into the national kho kho team, under Maria's name.

== Cast ==
- Rajisha Vijayan as Maria Francis, a former athlete, PE teacher and school Kho kho team coach
- Mamitha Baiju as Anju, school Kho kho team captain
- Venkitesh V. P. as Ben, Maria's husband who is a former athlete and a businessman
- Renjit Shekar Nair as Peon Shivaprasad, manager of the team
- Vettukili Prakash as Francis, Maria's father
- Rahul Riji Nair as Vinod
- Arjun Ranjan as Sports Official
- Sreejith Babu
- Jeo Baby as Meenakshi's father (cameo appearance)
- Geethi Sangeetha (cameo appearance)

== Production ==
In August 2020, Rahul Riji Nair announced that the next venture will be a sports movie one which will star Rajisha Vijayan in the lead role. After the 2019 film Finals, Rajisha Vijayan returns with another sports film. Rajisha Vijayan played the lead role as a Kho Kho coach in the movie. Mamitha Baiju played a supporting role as a Kho Kho school captain and she won the Best Supporting Actress at Kerala Film Critics Award. Tobin Thomas is the cinematographer, Sidhartha Pradeep is the music director and Christy Sebastian is the editor.

== Awards ==
Kerala Film Critics Award 2020

- Best Supporting Actress : Mamitha Baiju
- Special Jury Award : Rahul Riji Nair

== Music ==
Kho Kho

Soundtrack album by Sidhartha Pradeep
- Released: 24 March 2021
- Recorded: 2019–20
- Genre: Feature film soundtrack
- Length: 27:33
- Language: Malayalam, English
- Label: 123 Musix
- Producer: First Print Studios

Sidhartha Pradeep chronology
Ottamuri Velicham (2017)	Kho Kho (2021)
External audio
- Audio Jukebox on YouTube

The film's soundtrack album and score was composed by music director Sidhartha Pradeep. The Malayalam lyrics on the album were penned by writers Rahul Riji Nair, Arjun Ranjan and Vinayak Sasikumar, and the English rap lyrics by Aditi Nair R. The album was launched on 24 March 2021 by 123 Musix.

List of songs
No.	Title	Lyrics	Singer(s)	Length
1.	"Theeram Thane Unarum"	Rahul Riji Nair	Nandagopan V	2:15
2.	"Kaalam Varum Nin"	Arjun Ranjan	Bindu Anirudhan
3.	"Ninave Vaa"	Vinayak Sasikumar	Amritha Jayakumar
4.	"Rise theme"	Aditi Nair R	Aditi Nair R
5.	"Bayathe Karuthal Porutham"	Vinayak Sasikumar	Bharath Rajesh
6.	"Nin Neram Vanne"	Vinayak Sasikumar	Jazz Rathore
7.	"Smack with the Kho"	Aditi Nair R, Sidhartha Pradeep	Aditi Nair R, Nithin Raj
8.	"Boom boom bam"	Aditi Nair R	Aditi Nair R
9.	"Did She Catch Me"	Aditi Nair R	Aditi Nair R
10.	"Betterness"	Aditi Nair R	Aditi Nair R
11.	"Kho Kho Theevandi"	Vinayak Sasikumar	Souparnika Rajagopal, Aparna Sathyan
12.	"Venal Paathiyil"	Vinayak Sasikumar	Nandagopan V
Total length:				27:34

== Release ==
=== Theatrical ===
The film was released on 14 April 2021. On 20 April, the film was withdrawn from the theatres due to COVID-19 crisis.

=== Home media ===
The film was digitally streamed on Amazon Prime Video. It is also available in Hindi & Marathi language dubbed versions currently streaming on Ultra Play & Ultra Jhakaas app respectively.

== Reception ==
=== Critical reception ===
Sujit Chandrakumar of The Times of India described Kho Kho as "an inspirational sports drama."

Writing for Cinema Express, Sajin Shrijith lauded the film as a predictable but empowering sports drama. "The film doesn't bring anything new to the table in terms of storytelling. But at the same time, one wonders how many new ways can one narrate a sports drama, especially when motivation is its primary intention". He rated it as a film worth watching.

In a review for Firstpost, Anna MM Vetticad wrote, "Kho Kho stumbles intermittently when it gets too didactic or veers away from its slice-of-life narrative style. Nonetheless, it achieves a charming overall sweetness and positivity."
