= Jai Mahendran =

- Promotional release poster
- Genre: Drama
- Written by: Rahul Riji Nair
- Directed by: Srikanth Mohan
- Starring: Saiju Kurup; Miya George
- Music by: Sidhartha Pradeep
- Country of origin: India
- Original language: Malayalam
- No. of episodes: 6

Production
- Producer: Rahul Riji Nair
- Cinematography: Prasanth Raveendran
- Editor: Christy Sebastian
- Camera setup: Multi-camera
- Running time: 31–33 minutes
- Production company: First Print Studios

Original release
- Network: SonyLIV
- Release: 11 October 2024

Jai Mahendran is an Indian Malayalam-language drama streaming television series directed by Srikanth Mohan and written by Rahul Riji Nair. Produced under First Print Studios, starring Saiju Kurup and Miya George in lead roles. as Priya Mahendran. It premiered on SonyLIV on 11 October 2024.

== Cast ==
- Saiju Kurup as Deputy Tahasildar Mahendran
- Suhasini Maniratnam as Tahasildar Shobha
- Miya George as Priya Mahendran
- Suresh Krishna as Aravindan Tahasildar in charge
- Johny Antony as Chief Minister Chandy Kurian
- Maniyanpilla Raju as Koshy Thomas Revenue Minister
- Balachandran Chullikkad as Rtd Tahasildar Shibu
- Rahul Riji Nair as Balu a.k.a. Balagopal
- Vishnu Govindan as Saji
- Sidhartha Siva as Sathish
- Malavika Manoj as Malu; Shobha's daughter
- Pauly Valsan as Jancy
- Anand Manmadan as Babu
- Jeo Baby as Harichandran
- Appunni Sasi as Aniyankunju
- Krishnan Balakrishnan as Minister PS
- Renjith Sekhar Nair as Prajas
- Zhins Shan as Jacob
- Vinita Venugopal as Menaka
- Abraham Joseph

== Production ==
The series was announced on SonyLIV. The principal photography of the series commenced in April 2023. The filming was wrapped in June 2023. The trailer of the series was released on 28 September 2024.

== Release ==
The series was initially scheduled to release on 9 February 2024, but was later moved to 11 October 2024.

== Reception ==
Latha Srinivasan of Hindustan Times and Anandu Suresh of The Indian Express reviewed the series. Akhila Menon of OTTPlay gave the series 3/5 stars.
