= Aby (film) =

- Theatrical Release Poster
- Directed by: Srikant Murali
- Screenplay by: Santhosh Echikkanam
- Produced by: Suvin K. Varkey
- Starring: Vineeth Sreenivasan; Mareena Michael Kurisingal; Aju Varghese; Suraj Venjaramoodu; Sudheer Karamana; Vinitha Koshy
- Cinematography: Sudheer Surendran
- Edited by: Sooraj E. S.
- Music by: Anil Johnson
- Production company: Little Big Films
- Distributed by: Central Films
- Release date: 23 February 2017
- Running time: 133 minutes
- Country: India
- Language: Malayalam

Aby is a 2017 Indian Malayalam-language drama film directed by advertisement filmmaker Srikant Murali in his feature directorial debut. It is written by Santhosh Echikkanam and produced by Suvin K Varkey under the banner of Little Big Films. Vineeth Sreenivasan plays the lead and titular character of Aby and Aju Varghese and Suraj Venjaramoodu play supporting characters.

Aby dreams of flying and making an airplane on his own without any formal engineering education. The movie depicts how the hero struggles to make his dream come true, the obstacles he faces on his way to success, and how he achieves glory.

This film is based on Saji Thomas in a village in Kerala who can neither hear nor speak but designed and created a lightweight aircraft. There are two films that feature Saji Thomas' biography, the other one is titled Vimaanam (2017).

== Plot ==
Aby dreams of flying. The movie begins in his childhood, where he regularly jumped out of elevated positions in an attempt to fly, often injuring himself in the process. He barely spoke a word and is mentally disabled. He went to a special-needs school. His father works as a policy agent and eventually, uses Aby to gain the sympathy of potential customers to make them sign his policies. His mother finds out about his doings and Aby's absence from school because of this. A big fight between them ensues, and Aby's mother passes away the next morning.

A few years later, Aby is an adolescent and works at a mechanical workshop; now a savant in electronics. His father takes the salary to feed his alcoholism. His neighbour and girlfriend, Anumol, goes to school with him, along with Kunjootan. She requests Aby to help her make a science project for a competition which Aby agrees to. The project ends with it getting big recognition and Anumol getting rewarded with prizes. However, on the day she gets honoured, Aby's father arrives and makes a scene demanding the money as Aby made the project. A feud erupts between the neighbours. His father's alcoholism grows more and more volatile as he ends up burning a mockup helicopter made by Aby using an auto-rickshaw. Aby becomes frustrated and flees the town.

Aby reaches Bangalore where he meets some workers who sell salvage and scrap for money. He helps fix their phone and devises a mechanism to prank a man who was a nuisance to them. Soon, Aby becomes friends with them and joins their work. A few days later, he finds a discarded toy aeroplane, where he meets G. K. Menon, an alcoholic aeroplane manufacturer. Menon quickly becomes fond of Aby and his wish to fly, discovering his technical intelligence in the process. Menon shares his basic knowledge with him, fuelling Aby's fascination. Soon, Menon receives a job to manufacture a light aircraft, and Aby joins him. Aby records his conversations, learning more and more about aircraft in his free time. When the aircraft is built, Aby gets carried away and attempts to ride the aircraft and crashes it, earning Menon's frustration and anger. Menon scolds Aby, demands he go away, and Aby leaves for his hometown.

It is now seven years since his return, and Anumol is helping the village expand. He has gathered materials and begins work on a glider for three years. Anumol, amidst the rekindled family feud, helps Aby build a glider, which gradually grabs the attention of the media and people from distant places. This earns her anger from her father who builds hatred towards Aby and his work. On the debut of his homemade glider with hundreds of onlookers, he is halted by law enforcement who states that he did not have paperwork, making the flight illegal. Aby, with the help of Anumol and several of his townsfolk, gathers the required paperwork. His father provides the money he's saved up, showing that he is turning into a better man and quitting his alcoholism. Menon even appears, being a certified aeroplane manufacturer, saying that Aby has built the most efficient model he has seen in his career, giving him approval. Anumol's father attempts to sabotage the paperwork, where Anumol begs and pleads to let Aby fly and not take vengeance on his dreams. Anumol's father reconsiders his actions and decides that he wants to see Aby achieve his goal.

Aby's glider is now ready to go once again, with the correct paperwork filed in and now legal. However, another obstacle arises as law enforcement gets a tip about Aby's disability and that his craft hasn't been flown by a certified pilot. Anumol's father confesses to tipping against him, with Menon vouching for Aby's mental status. This promptly evolves into a huge quarrel involving the frustrated onlookers, which Aby takes advantage of and flies the glider successfully; with the aid of Menon giving instructions. Hundreds of onlookers and the police watch with fascination, ending the argument and being proud that Aby has made his dreams a reality.

At present, Aby is shown as an expert glider, selected by Air Asia in Dubai and is seen soaring the skies with a glider as the movie ends.

== Cast ==
- Vineeth Sreenivasan as Aby
  - Vasudev Sajeesh Marar as young Aby
- Mareena Michael Kurisingal as Anumol Xavier
- Aju Varghese as Kunjootan
- Suraj Venjaramoodu as Xavier, Anumol's father
- Sudheer Karamana as Babychan, Aby's father
- Vinitha Koshy as Clara
- Hareesh Peradi as Ravi
- Manish Choudhary as GK Menon
- Shaji Chen as Javed
- Dileesh Pothan as C.I George
- Hari Nambotha as Aby's Friend
- Balaji Sarma as John Jacob
- Azees Nedumangad
- Maya Menon as Jeenamma
- Praseetha Menon as Sathi
- Omana Ouseph as Nun
- Gilu Joseph
- Divya M. Nair as Haseena
- Subeesh Sudhi as Punnoose
- Gokulan as Villager
- Surjith Gopinath as Crispy

== Production ==
In August 2016, taking a hiatus from advertisement, Srikant Murali announced his debut feature film featuring Vineeth Sreenivasan. The principal photography commenced in September 2016 in Thodupuzha, Kerala. The major portions of the film are set against the backdrop of Idukki and Ernakulam. Some parts were also shot at Gundlupet, a small town in Karnataka.

== Music ==
Aby

Soundtrack album to Aby by Bijibal and Jaison J Nair
- Released: 4 February 2017
- Genre: Film soundtrack
- Length: 16:44
- Language: Malayalam
- Label: Manorama Music
- Producers: Bijibal and Jaison J Nair

The film's original soundtrack was released by Manorama Music. The songs are composed by Bijibal and Jaison J Nair while the background score is composed by Anil Johnson.

No.	Title	Singer(s)	Length
1.	"Onnurangi"	Vineeth Sreenivasan, Saritha Ram	3:22
2.	"Paripparakkum Kili"	Sangeetha Sreekanth	3:12
3.	"Parudeesayile"	Soumya Ramakrishnan	4:03
4.	"Leysa Aleysa"	Niranj Suresh	3:12
5.	"Puthen Sooryan"	Arun Alat	2:55

== Release ==
The film was released on 23 February 2017 in 108 screens across Kerala. Aby is one of the biggest releases of Vineeth Sreenivasan in Kerala.

=== Marketing ===
At Vyttila in Kochi and East Fort, Thiruvananthapuram, 3D hoardings having a 25 feet model aircraft attached with a rotating propeller was placed as part of promotions. Aby is the first Malayalam movie to have a 3D advertisement billboard as part of marketing. AirAsia is an official airline partner of the movie, the first Malayalam movie and second South Indian movie to have an airline partner after Kabali. As part of the movie's promotions, AirAsia offered special promotional fares from Kochi to Hyderabad and Bangalore with the campaign "Fly Like Aby".

== Critical response ==
The movie received positive reviews from critics. Litty Simon from Malayala Manorama wrote: "In his first directorial venture as a filmmaker, Srikant aptly portrays various emotions – innocence, the love, the family bonding, the failure, and achievements. With a simple plot, Aby is a movie that can be enjoyed by all age groups. The feel-good motivational drama, Aby, made with some genuine intentions is a darling film."

In her review for The Times of India, Deepa Soman rated the film 3.5 out of 5 stars. She lauded the crew for brilliant casting, right from the child artiste who plays the little Aby, his parents (Sudheer Karamana and Vineetha Koshy), his friend Kunjoottan played by Aju Varghese and his lady love Anumol by Mareena Michael. Overall, this is one of those films with an unconventional underdog as the hero, for whom you would root with tears in your eyes and a smile on your face, and come out of the hall with a wholesome cinematic experience.

Arathi Kannan of The New Indian Express has written that Aby is the kind of movie where wishes written on the blue skies are made into a reality with sheer earnestness and persistence. She mentioned that "Aby's story makes for a scroll that rolls down to read 'optimism' in bold, Aby stands true to the inspirational movie genre and strives towards the goal, flitting through serendipitous meetings and the right-person-at-the-right-time situations."

Baradwaj Rangan of Film Companion South wrote "Aby is a whimsical film. Quirky music is slathered on it, like a tour guide who won't stop jabbering and let you take in the sights yourself. But look past this, and you'll find charming vignettes woven around a boy who dreams of flying."

== Television rights ==
The satellite rights for the movie was sold to Surya TV.

== Box office ==
The film completed 25 days in theatres as of 20 March 2017.
