= Lovefully Yours Veda =

2023 Indian drama film directed by Praghesh Sukumaran

- Theatrical poster
- Directed by: Praghesh Sukumaran
- Written by: Babu Vayalathur
- Produced by: Radhakrishnan Khalayil; Ruvin Viswam
- Starring: Rajisha Vijayan; Venkitesh V.P; Sreenath Bhasi; Gautham Vasudev Menon
- Cinematography: Tobin Thomas
- Edited by: Sobin K Soman
- Music by: Rahul Raj
- Production company: R2 Entertainments
- Distributed by: Sree Priya Combines; R2 Entertainments
- Release date: 3 March 2023
- Running time: 132 minutes
- Country: India
- Language: Malayalam

Lovefully Yours Veda is a 2023 Indian Malayalam-language romance drama thriller film directed by Praghesh Sukumaran and jointly produced by Radhakrishnan Khalayil and Ruvin Viswam through R2 Entertainments, with a screenplay by Babu Vayalathur. The film stars Rajisha Vijayan, Gautham Vasudev Menon, Sreenath Bhasi, Anikha Surendran, Venkitesh V.P, Chandhunadh and Appani Sarath. The film was co-produced by Abdul Salim. The plot follows a mix of campus romance and political drama set in the 90s.

The original background score and songs are composed by Rahul Raj. Principal photography began in January 2022. Lovefully Yours Veda was released in March 2023.

== Plot ==
Maalu, a member of the musical band Banjara's, chances upon a poem on the walls of Varma College, Thrissur. The band reworks it into a song and it becomes a big hit in no time. People get curious about the lyricist and the band has no clue about the author of the poem. The band embarks on a journey to discover the poet and reaches Varma College. They come to know about Sree Veda, a former student of the college and the poet in question.

The youngsters meet Veda and she reminisces about the story behind the poem, her eventful college life, and Comrade Jeevanlal, the charming man who revolutionized her world.

== Cast ==
- Rajisha Vijayan as Sree Veda
- Venkitesh V. P. as Jeevanlal
- Sreenath Bhasi as Ranjan Abhraham
- Gautham Vasudev Menon as Sri Kumar Kartha
- Appani Sarath as Kanimangalam Stephen
- Shaju Sreedhar
- Sruthi Jayan
- Anikha Surendran as Maalu
- Chandhunadh as Sijo
- Ranjit Shekar as Akbar

== Production ==
=== Filming ===
The film's principal photography started on 16 December 2021 with the switch-on ceremony. It took 62 days in 4 schedules to complete the shoot. The post-production of the film started in October 2022 and Rajisha Vijayan herself announced the release date when the promotions for the film were ongoing.

== Music ==
The original background score and songs are composed by Rahul Raj. The music rights were bagged by Sony Music. The first single Aakaasha Paalazhiyil was released on Sony Music and it crossed more than 1 million views in a short span.

== Reception ==
=== Critical Response ===
Vignesh Madhu, critic of Cinema Express, gave the film 2 out 5 stars and stated that "Everything in the film, be its story, setting, characters, and conflicts, are already familiar to an average Malayali audience". Shilpa S, critic of OTTplay, gave it 3 stars out of 5 and wrote: "Lovefully Yours Veda makes no attempt to hide that it is Venkitesh's vehicle through and through, done in a way that becomes cliched and unoriginal, as far as the story is concerned. Although not given a lot to work with, Rajisha Vijayan and Sreenadh Bhasi try to make the best of what they are given, and brilliantly so."
