= Venkitesh V. P. =

Indian actor

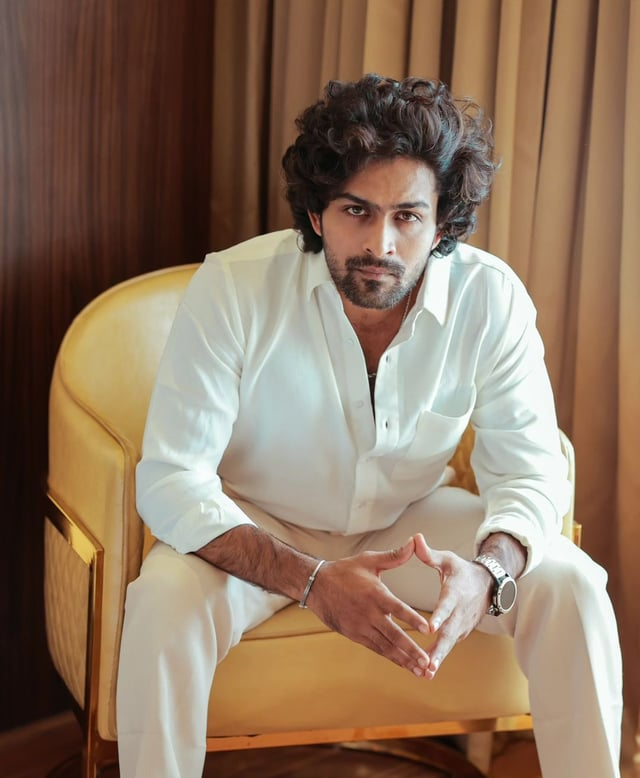
- Born: Thiruvananthapuram, Kerala, India
- Occupations: Actor, television personality
- Years active: 2014–present
- Organization: Suda Suda Idli
- Parents: Pichumani (father); Tharakumari (mother)

Venkitesh V.P. (also known as Venki) is an Indian actor and television personality known for his work in Malayalam cinema and television. He gained recognition as a contestant on the reality show Nayika Nayakan and has appeared in multiple Malayalam films, including his Telugu film debut Kingdom.

== Early life ==
Venkitesh was born on August 9, 1993, to Pichumani, a Malayali-Tamil Brahmin, and Tharakumari, a Malayali Nair housewife, in Westfort Sreevaraham, Thiruvananthapuram, Kerala, adjacent to the Sri Padmanabha Swami temple.

== Career ==
=== Television ===
Venkitesh rose to prominence as a contestant in the Malayalam reality show Nayika Nayakan (2018) aired on Mazhavil Manorama, where he was noted for his comedic skills. He later appeared as a co-host on Udan Panam season 5 on Mazhavil Manorama.

=== Film ===
Venkitesh began his acting career with small roles in Malayalam films such as Velipadinte Pusthakam (2017), Odiyan (2018), and Thattumpurath Achuthan (2018). He played one of the leads in Stand Up (2019). In 2021, he appeared in supporting roles in The Priest and Kho-Kho. In 2023, he appeared in Lovefully Yours Veda. He made his Telugu debut in 2025 with the film Kingdom playing the antagonist.

=== Other ventures ===
In 2024, Venkitesh co-founded a startup named Suda Suda Idli in Thiruvananthapuram and now in Calicut (2nd Branch), Kerala, along with a group of friends. The initiative, which began as a street food truck with variety combination of Idli near the Sree Padmanabha Swamy Temple, gained media attention for its unique concept and for Venkitesh's active involvement in the operations.

== Filmography ==
- All films are in Malayalam-language, unless otherwise noted.

Year	Title	Role	Notes	Ref.
2014	Mizhi Thurakku			
2015	Ammakkoru Tharattu			
2017	Velipadinte Pusthakam	College student		
2018	Odiyan	Villager		
2018	Thattumpurath Achuthan	Devotional singer		
2019	Stand Up	Amal		
2021	The Priest	Siddharth		
2021	Kho-Kho	Ben		
2022	Viral Sebi			
2023	Lovefully Yours Veda	Jeevanlal		
2024	Rebel	Antony	Debut Tamil film	
2025	Kingdom	Murugan	Debut Telugu film	
TBA	DGP	TBA	Telugu film	

== Television ==
Year	Show	Role	Channel	Ref.
2018	Nayika Nayakan	Contestant	Mazhavil Manorama	
2024	Udan Panam season 5	Co-host	Mazhavil Manorama	
