= Dakini (film) =

2018 drama film by Rahul Riji Nair

- First look poster
- Directed by: Rahul Riji Nair
- Written by: Rahul Riji Nair
- Produced by: B Rakesh; Sandip Senan
- Starring: Aju Varghese; Pauly Valsan; Sarasa Balussery; Savithri Sreedharan; Sethu Lakshmi; Alencier; Chemban Vinod
- Cinematography: Alex J. Pulickal
- Edited by: Appu N Bhattathiri
- Music by: Rahul Raj
- Distributed by: Friday Film House
- Release date: 18 October 2018
- Running time: 125 minutes
- Country: India
- Language: Malayalam

Dakini is a 2018 Malayalam-language adventure comedy film directed by Rahul Riji Nair starring Aju Varghese, Pauly Valsan, Sarasa Balussery, Savithri Sreedharan, Sethu Lakshmi, Alencier and Chemban Vinod. It was produced under the banner of Universal Cinema & Urvasi Theatres Release. The film revolves around four elderly women.

== Plot ==
Four grannies namely, Mollykutty, Saroja, Rosemary and Vilasini lives with their helper Jeemon. They learn things like WhatsApp with the help of Jeemon.

Kuttan Pilla who was the lover of Mollykutty who left her in their young age comes back. Kuttan Pilla betrays a local don named Mayan in a hawala dealing and escapes with money. Maayan kidnaps Kuttan Pillai.

In the later part these four grandmother's with the help their aid and his friend Vikraman Parudeesa a local gangster helps them. These elderly women call Maayan as Dakini (cartoon character from Mayavi). Later they saves Kuttan Pillai from the hands of Maayan.

== Cast ==
- Pauly Valsan as Mollykutty
- Sarasa Balussery as Saroja
- Savithri Sreedharan as Rosemary
- Sethu Lakshmi as Vilasini
- Mamitha Baiju as Arathy
- Alencier as Kuttan Pillai
- Aju Varghese as Jeemon
- Chemban Vinod as Maayan
- Saiju Kurup as Vikraman Parudeesa
- Indrans as Raju Bhai
- Renjit Shekar Nair as Indran
- Arjun Ranjan as Kuttan Pillai's associate

== Release ==
Dakini was released on 18 October 2018.

== Reception ==
The Times of India gave the film a rating of 3.5/5 and Mathrubhumi gave the film a rating of 1.5/5.
