= Masthishka Maranam =

2026 Indian Malayalam-language film

- Theatrical release poster
- Directed by: Krishand
- Written by: Krishand
- Produced by: Vinayaka Ajith
- Starring: Rajisha Vijayan; Niranj Maniyanpilla Raju; Divya Prabha; Jagadish; Suresh Krishna
- Cinematography: Prayag Mukundan
- Edited by: Krishand
- Music by: Varkey
- Production companies: Ajith Vinayaka Films; Krishand Films
- Release date: 27 February 2026
- Country: India
- Language: Malayalam

Masthishka Maranam (lit. 'Brain death'; subtitled A Frankenbiting of Simon's Memories) is a 2026 Indian Malayalam-language cyberpunk comedy film written and directed by Krishand. It stars Rajisha Vijayan, Niranj Maniyanpilla Raju, Divya Prabha, Jagadish and Suresh Krishna. The film was released theatrically on 27 February 2026 and began streaming on Netflix on 27 March 2026.

Set in 2046 in a dystopian Kochi, the film follows Bimal Raj, a grieving father who enters a virtual-reality memory game to reconnect with his dead daughter and inadvertently becomes entangled in a scandal.

== Cast ==
- Rajisha Vijayan as Frida Soman /Shalini Mullumurikkel
- Niranj Maniyanpilla Raju as Bimal Raj
- Divya Prabha as Advocate Desdemona
- Jagadish as Inspector Praveen Shashank
- Suresh Krishna as Charlie
- Vishnu Agasthya as Advocate Don
- Nandhu as Harry Kumar Reporter
- Santhy Balachandran as Veda
- Manoj Kana as Professor
- Rahul Rajagopal

== Production ==
Krishand conceived the film as a cyberpunk work set in a futuristic Kochi, developed around themes of "digital voyeurism", content culture, and celebrity stardom. In a pre-release interview, he described it as his first film consciously aimed at a wide theatrical audience, while retaining his interest in speculative and experimental storytelling. Krishand had previously served as an executive producer on Gaganachari (2024), another Malayalam cyberpunk film.

== Reception ==
Onmanorama wrote that "Its execution may divide audiences, and its storytelling demands patience. But its themes — though wrapped in eccentricity — are relatable, sharp and, at times, genuinely funny. The Indian Express wrote that this "cyberpunk comedy is more than a spectacle for the senses", rating 3.5 out of five stars.
