= Oru Thathvika Avalokanam =

- Theatrical release poster
- Directed by: Akhil Marar
- Written by: Akhil Marar
- Produced by: Geevarghese Yohannan
- Starring: Joju George; Niranj Maniyanpilla Raju; Aju Varghese; Shammi Thilakan; Abhirami Girish
- Cinematography: Vishnu Narayanan
- Edited by: Lijo Paul
- Music by: O. K. Ravi Shankar (Songs); Shaan Rahman (Score)
- Production company: Yohan Productions
- Distributed by: Yohan Movies
- Release date: 31 December 2021
- Country: India
- Language: Malayalam

Oru Thathvika Avalokanam (transl. A theoretical analysis) is a 2021 Indian Malayalam-language political satire film written and directed by Akhil Marar and produced by Geevarghese Yohannan. The film stars Joju George, Aju Varghese, and Shammi Thilakan, with Mamukkoya, Abhirami Girish, and Niranj Maniyanpilla Raju in supporting roles. The film was released theatrically on 31 December 2021.

== Plot ==
Shanker is a government contractor struggling to get his work bills passed even after 10 years. After a routine visit to secretariat to clear his bills, he breaks the ruling left party’s flag and mast at his hometown in a fit of rage in the night. Next morning the local area secretary Satyan and his assistant comrade Chandran ponder over who broke the flag and thinks it is the work of right wing party leader Padmakumar and his henchmen. Meanwhile at Delhi a terrorist leader sends his accomplices in a mission to Kerala to deliver a costly diamond to Aseem Bhai. At yet another place, Nandakumar is an idealistic youngster out to appear for his police entrance exams that day. He boards the bus to Ramankotta, the same place of Shanker, Satyan and his senior leader Vattavila Raghavan where the exam is supposed to take place.

The terrorists from Delhi out to deliver the diamond also boards the same bus to make the delivery. The bus is hijacked by Damodaran, a former KSRTC employee who is a mental patient now because of the issues at his workplace. SI Thankachan manages to stop the bus and subdue Damodaran, but the terrorists end up shooting in the air out of confusion to escape from the bus. Thankachan and his aide chases both of them for a long time and to avoid getting caught with the diamond, one of them hides it in a bike’s petrol tank which was parked on the roadside. Unknown to them, the bike was left there by Shanker when he ran out of petrol and had gone to the nearby petrol station. Nandakumar who is getting late for the exam since the bus was seized by the police, gets a lift from Shanker after he refills the bike and resumes his journey. The terrorist accomplices try to get the diamond back from the bike, but they find that he has already left with the boke when they were being chased by the police.

At Ramankotta, a political meeting was underway regarding the case of broken party flag, Satyan is delivering a firebrand speech about how they managed to restore the flag quickly and is accusing all his political rivals regarding the incident. Shanker who passes through the area the same time with Nandakumar swerves his bike to save themselves from another oncoming vehicle and Nandu ends up breaking the flag and mast again accidentally. He is beat up by the party goons and misses his exam as a result. He goes into an outburst at the police station, accusing the left, right and Centre political parties about their incompetence and rants about how he was preparing himself for the police job itself even after getting in the rank list of many other jobs. This incident is recorded and shared in social media by some of the cops and Nandu becomes an overnight social media sensation.

Shanker comes one day to meet Nandu and asks him to help him in getting back at Raghavan and his party. He opens up about his past to him in the flashback where he reveals that Raghavan and his party members harassed him and filed a fake corruption case against him since he had refused to donate to them in large amounts. He does not get his payments as a result putting him in great financial struggle and ends up with his wife committing suicide. He goes to court and wins the case in favor of him, but the government goes for an appeal to higher court against the decision. Nandu also reveals his past to Shanker involving his romantic interest. He and his girlfriend are harassed by some thugs while outside and Nandu secretly thrashes them unknown to his girlfriend. But she thinks of him as a coward and begins a relationship with a police constable who openly thrashes the goons in front of her. After the incident Nandu is hell bent on getting a post higher than that specific constable guy to prove himself and make a point. Shanker reveals his plan to Nandu about filing a nomination to contest in the by-election at Ramankotta against the 3 usual parties who have equal chance of winning. Nandu is skeptical at first about the plan, but Shanker manages to convince him to work together. They manage to bring all the 3 party’s leaders to Shankar’s building (the one where construction was stopped due to Raghavan and his party’s complaint) where Shanker stages a suicide drama and gets some money from each party, reminding them that the by-election will be called off if one of the nominees dies before the voting. All the parties pay up due to the fear of ending up with less chances of winning once the election in postponed. They secretly record Satyan going to an astrologer for checking the win probability and also Padmakumar eating beef at Aseem Bhai’s house.

The terrorist accomplices who were hiding in the uncompleted building of Shanker identifies the bike and silently takes off with it to Aseem Bhai who had threatened them with dire consequences if they don’t return the diamond to him. On the way the accelerator cable gets stuck and they crash at the same junction, burning Shankar's bike and the diamond getting into the ex-Naxalite/doper’s hand who always hangs around the town center. Next day, Shankar utilizes the incident to his end, claiming to the media that the parties are threatening him and doing such things to keep him from contesting. SI Thankachan arrests Chandran for the charge of burning Shankar's bike. Chandran was present there during the incident and the Naxalite tells the police that he is the culprit. Shanker and Nandakumar releases Satyan and Padmakumar’s videos into social media and also reveals to them about the money he received from all the 3 parties, bringing instant shame to all. The terrorists with Aseem Bhai had planned the operation to blow up the Palarivattom Bridge, but did not have to resort to it since the bridge collapsed by itself due to corrupt construction practices by the congress party leader’s brother in law who was the contractor, which puts them also in a fix ahead of the by-election. Shanker wins the by-election by a huge margin and becomes MLA and a prominent figure in the government circles. Nandakumar finally gets his dream job and gets back at the constable who is forced to salute his superior Nandu. The terrorist assistants gets back the diamond from the Naxalite when they gave him some money for dope unknowingly. Raghavan, Satyan and Chandran openly becomes believers and go on a sabarimala pilgrimage.

== Cast ==
- Joju George as MLA Shanker
- Niranj Maniyanpilla Raju as SI Nandakumar
- Aju Varghese as Chandran
- Mammukoya as Aseem Bhai
- Shammi Thilakan as Satyan
- Abhirami Girish as Sri
- Azees Nedumangad as Damodaran Kili
- Major Ravi as Vattavila Raghavan
- Prasanth
- Jayakrishnan as Padmakumar
- Prem Kumar
- Balaji Sarma as SI Thangachan
- Nandhan Unni as Unni
- Praveen Sudhakar Jalaja
- Manuraj
- Sundarapandian
- K. P. Suresh Kumar
- Akhil Marar as Thief
- Surjith Gopinath as Naxel Shankaran

== Production ==
The film was officially announced on 6 September 2020. The shooting of the film was started in January 2021 and wrapped in September 2021.

== Music ==
Oru Thathvika Avalokanam

Soundtrack album by O. K. Ravi Shankar
- Released: 2021
- Recorded: 2021
- Genre: Feature film soundtrack
- Length: 3:30
- Language: Malayalam
- Label: Manorama Music
- Producer: Dr. Geevarghese Yohannan

Singles from Oru Thathvika Avalokanam
- 1. "Aana Poloru" Released: 11 April 2021; 2. "Thanka Sooryan" Released: 1 May 2021

The songs of the film was composed by O. K. Ravi Shankar, while background score was composed by Shaan Rahman.

Tracklist
No.	Title	Lyrics	Music	Singer(s)	Length
1.	"Aana Poloru"	Murugan Kattakada	O. K. Ravi Shankar	Shankar Mahadevan	3:20
2.	"Thanka Sooryan"	Kaithapram Damodaran Namboothiri	O. K. Ravi Shankar	Madhu Balakrishnan, Rajalakshmi, Jose Sagar, Khalid,	3:31
Total length:					6:51

== Release ==
The film was released worldwide on 31 December 2021.

The Times of India rated 3 out of 5 stars and wrote that the film gives a "handful of moments of humour for one to remember and laugh, once you leave the theatre", however, "in certain stretches, it gets too preachy as well, which dulls the overall impact".
