= Kappi Squad =

- Genre: Comedy drama
- Created by: Srikanth Mohan
- Written by: Adithya Thejas; Subin George
- Directed by: Belraj Kalarickal
- Starring: Rinosh George; Anagha Ajith; Diya Deepan; Joel Joseph; Abhirami Dayanandan
- Country of origin: India
- Original language: Malayalam
- No. of seasons: 1

Production
- Producer: Rahul Riji Nair
- Production company: First Print Studios

Original release
- Network: JioHotstar
- Release: October 15, 2026

Kappi Squad is an Indian Malayalam-language comedy-drama web series created by Srikanth Mohan and directed by Belraj Kalarickal. Produced by Rahul Riji Nair under First Print Studios, it premiered on JioHotstar on 15 October 2026.

== Premise ==
The series follows a group of young friends, Kiran, Pappi, Anu and Isha, who leave behind their routine lives and try to build a future by opening a cafe together.

== Cast ==
- Rinosh George as Kiran
- Joel Joseph as Pappi
- Anagha Ajith as Anu
- Diya Deepan as Isha
- Abhirami Dayanandan
- Rahul Riji Nair

== Episodes ==
No. in season	Title	Original release date
1	"Hangover"	15 October 2026
2	"The First and Last Sip"	15 October 2026
3	"Grandma and the Birthday Party"	15 October 2026
4	"Mission: Best Coffee"	15 October 2026
5	"The Coffee Hunt"	22 October 2026
6	"Cafe Dream"	22 October 2026
7	"Hidden Secrets"	22 October 2026
8	"Car and Café"	22 October 2026
9	"Light, Camera, Coffee"	29 October 2026
10	"Worst Coffee Experience"	29 October 2026
11	"Childhood Friend & The Groom"	29 October 2026
12	"Barista Arrives"	29 October 2026

== Production ==
The series was created by actor-filmmaker Srikanth Mohan, who had earlier directed the SonyLIV series Jai Mahendran. It was directed by Belraj Kalarickal and written by Adithya Thejas and Subin George. It marks the OTT debut of Bigg Boss Malayalam contestant Rinosh George.

Kalarickal, a founding member of First Print Studios, died shortly after the series premiered.

== Release ==
The first season premiered on JioHotstar on 15 October 2026, with a planned run of 100 episodes.

== Reception ==
M9 News described the series as an average but watchable urban comedy.
