= Savithri Sreedharan =

Indian actress (1940/1941–2026)

- Born: 1940 or 1941
- Died: 23 September 2026 (aged 85); Mankavu, Kozhikode, Kerala, India
- Occupation: Actress
- Years active: 1991–2026

Savithri Sreedharan (1940 or 1941 – 23 September 2026) was an Indian theatre and film actress. She was a part of several Calicut-based theatre groups for over 40 years and made her film debut in 2018 in the film Sudani from Nigeria which earned her a Special Mention at the 66th National Film Awards. Her other major films are Virus (2019) and Dakini (2018).

== Life and career ==
Sreedharan was a professional drama actress for her last 40 years in the Malayalam drama world, with Kozhikode-based drama theatres such as Kalimga, Sangamam, Stage Inda, and Chiranthana theatres.

Sreedharan died at her residence in Mankavu, Kozhikode, Kerala, on 23 September 2026, at the age of 85. She had been suffering from age-related ailments.

== Filmography ==
- All films are in Malayalam unless otherwise noted.

List of Savithri Sreedharan film credits
Year	Title	Role	Notes
1991	Kadavu		
2010	Valiyangadi	Antharjanam	
2013	Breakfast	Old train passenger	Short film
2015	The Mango People	Sarojini Nair	Short film
2018	Sudani from Nigeria	Jameela	
2018	Dakini	Rosemary	
2019	Mera Naam Shaji	Pankajam	
2019	Virus	Jameela	
2019	Mohabbathin Kunjabdulla	Alima's neighbour	
2019	Ittymaani: Made in China	Inmate at old age home	
2019	Oru Kadathu Katha	Subaida	
2020	Urmila	Grandmother	Musical album
2021	Ice Orathi	Nalini	
2022	Pada	Kunji	
2022	Madappally United	Grandmother	
2022	Maahi		
2022	Paappan	Chacko's mother	
2022	Beyond 7 Seas	–	
2022	Mei Hoom Moosa	Narayani	
2023	Christy	Accama Tharian	
2024	Vayasethrayaayi? Muppathiee..!!	Vilasini	

== Dramas ==
- Rajyasabha
- Ithu Bhoomiyanu
- Khafar
- Srishti
- Deepasthambham Mahascharyam
- Ijj Nalloru Manissanakan Nokk
- Pakida 12
- Padanilam
- Medapathu
- Akkarapacha
- Aalmarattam
- Karutha Vella
- Nottukal
- Thazhvara
- Thathwamasi
- Vazhiyambalam
- Kshanikkunnu Kudumbasametham

== Awards ==
- 1977 – Kerala State Award for Best Theatre Artist
- 1993 – Kerala State Award for Best Theatre Artist
- 2009 – Kerala Sangeetha Nataka Akademi Award for Drama
- 2018 – National Film Award – Special Mention: Sudani from Nigeria
- 2018 – Kerala State Film Award for Best Character Actress: Sudani from Nigeria
- 2018 – Asianet Film Award for Best Supporting Actress: Sudani from Nigeria
- 2018 – Filmfare Award for Best Supporting Actress – Malayalam: Sudani from Nigeria
