= Stand Up (2019 film) =

- Directed by: Vidhu Vincent
- Written by: Umesh Omanakuttan
- Produced by: Anto Joseph; Unnikrishnan.B
- Starring: Rajisha Vijayan; Nimisha Sajayan; Venkitesh V. P. Arjun Ashokan
- Cinematography: Tobin Thomas
- Edited by: Christy Sebastian
- Music by: Varkey
- Production company: Anto Joseph Film Company
- Release date: 13 December 2019
- Running time: 118 minutes
- Country: India
- Language: Malayalam

Stand Up is a 2019 Malayalam-language film directed by Vidhu Vincent and starring Rajisha Vijayan, Nimisha Sajayan, Venkitesh V. P., and Arjun Ashokan. It tells the story of Keerthi, an aspiring stand-up comedian, who is trying to find opportunities for her shows amidst several difficulties.

== Plot ==
Keerthi, an aspiring stand-up comedian, narrates the story of her friend Diya who was attacked in an apartment and is branded a victim.

Keerthi is performing on-stage where many stand-up comedians are presenting their acts. She starts with the typical stand-up comedy and talks about her family. Her brother Amal and her friend Diya are in a relationship. However, there is always a friction between them as Amal considers Diya to be more fond of her friends. Things go downhill at times. Amal convinces his mother to agree to their marriage and he meets Diya to tell her. Diya tells him that she has been admitted to Delhi University and is going to pursue her studies. Amal is enraged because he had previously told Diya not to. Things escalate to the extent that they eventually break up, but Amal is still not willing to let go. Sujith asks Diya to his flat for a final talk. Amal tells Sujith off and begins to talk to Diya angrily. He assaults her and leaves her unconscious. Sujith is framed for the rape and there is immense pressure on Diya to refrain from legal proceedings. Keerthi is forced to leave her home for supporting Diya. They come together to find justice for Diya.

== Cast ==
- Rajisha Vijayan as Diya
- Nimisha Sajayan as Keerthi
- Venkitesh V. P. as Amal
- Arjun Ashokan as Sujith
- Sajitha Madathil as Maria
- Jolly Chirayath as Mini
- Seema as Dr. Asha
- Rajesh Sharma as Diya's father
- Sethu Lakshmi as Achamma
- Divya Gopinath as Thasni

== Reception ==
The Times of India said that the film is "a brave female perspective on addressing abuse" and rated it 3.5 out of 5. A review in The Hindu praised the film for similar reasons; as did The New Indian Express, that found the film "disturbing, enraging and uplifting all at once." but its first half weaker than the second.

The website Lensmen Reviews also praised the film's message but criticised its ’amateurish’ production.

The News Minute recalled the film had been criticised for its writing but that "Rajisha (Vijayan)'s performance as Diya, a sexual assault survivor, was appreciated", characterising her performance as "raw" and finding that her acting as well as Nimisha Sajayan's one were among the main assets of the film. Cinema express too praised the actress's performance in the film.
