= Vanyam =

- Directed by: Sohan Seenulal
- Written by: Sohan Seenulal
- Produced by: P. S. Nagaraj
- Starring: Aparna Nair, Vishnu Unnikrishnan
- Music by: Sejo John
- Release date: 2016
- Country: India
- Language: Malayalam

Vanyam is a 2016 Malayalam language film produced by P.S. Nagaraj. The film stars Aparna Nair in the lead role along with Anoop Ramesh, Vishnu Unnikrishnan, Sumith Samudra, Pauly Valsan and Omana Ouseph. The film is directed by Sohan Seenulal. The music is composed by Sejo John. The screenplay is based on a story written by Sohan Seenulal. The film attracted controversy when a real nun was raped in North India at the time the film was being shot.

== Plot ==
The film shows the life of three unemployed youths Riyaz, Krishna and Vivek. They spend their lives in Riyaz's bicycle shop discussing the lavish life rich people have. All of them were trying to build up love affairs but all efforts were in vain as girls were not interested in them. Later they try to engage a woman sex worker to fulfill their lust, but that also goes in vain when she charges more for her service. Later Vivek comes up with a plan to rape a nun. The idea behind the plan was that being a nun she will not tell about the incident to the outside world. Their plans work out well as the church did not make the news public but expels her from her service as she becomes pregnant. Later Riyaz starts to feel guilty and pleads with her to marry him but she objects. Later the film ends with Riyaz committing suicide outside Aneeta's house.

== Cast ==
- Aparna Nair as Sr. Aneeta
- Anoop Ramesh as Riyaz
- Vishnu Unnikrishnan as Vivek
- Sumith Samudra as Krishna Kumar
- Pauly Valsan as Susheela
- Joy as Christy
- Omana Ouseph as Sr. Theresa
- Sreekanth Nair as Village Boy

== Soundtrack ==
The music is composed by Sejo John along with Sugathakumari.

- "Theyyare"- Sejo John
- "Ethra Noottaandukal"- Sugathakumari
