= The Human Boundaries =

2012 Indian documentary film

- Directed by: Rahul Riji Nair
- Production company: First Print Studios
- Release date: 2012
- Running time: 35 minutes
- Country: India
- Language: Hindi

The Human Boundaries is a documentary film on the life of Hindu refugees from Pakistan.

== Synopsis ==
A group of 152 Pakistani Hindus entered India in September 2011 with a one-month tourist visa. They came as refugees from the various religious persecutions they had to face in Pakistan. The group, which has a majority of children and women, are currently sheltered in a camp on the outskirts of New Delhi. However, their visa has expired, and the group faces deportation. Various organizations are fighting for the basic human rights of these people at the political and judicial levels. Their story is a grim reminder to all those who have found themselves in a no man's land.

== Production ==
The film was shot in a highly restricted and sensitive environment inside the refugee camp within a short span of three days. Minimal filming equipment was used. The documentary traces the difficulties they have to face in Pakistan, their life inside the camp, and their hopes for tomorrow.
