= Sohan Seenulal =

Indian film director (born 1978)

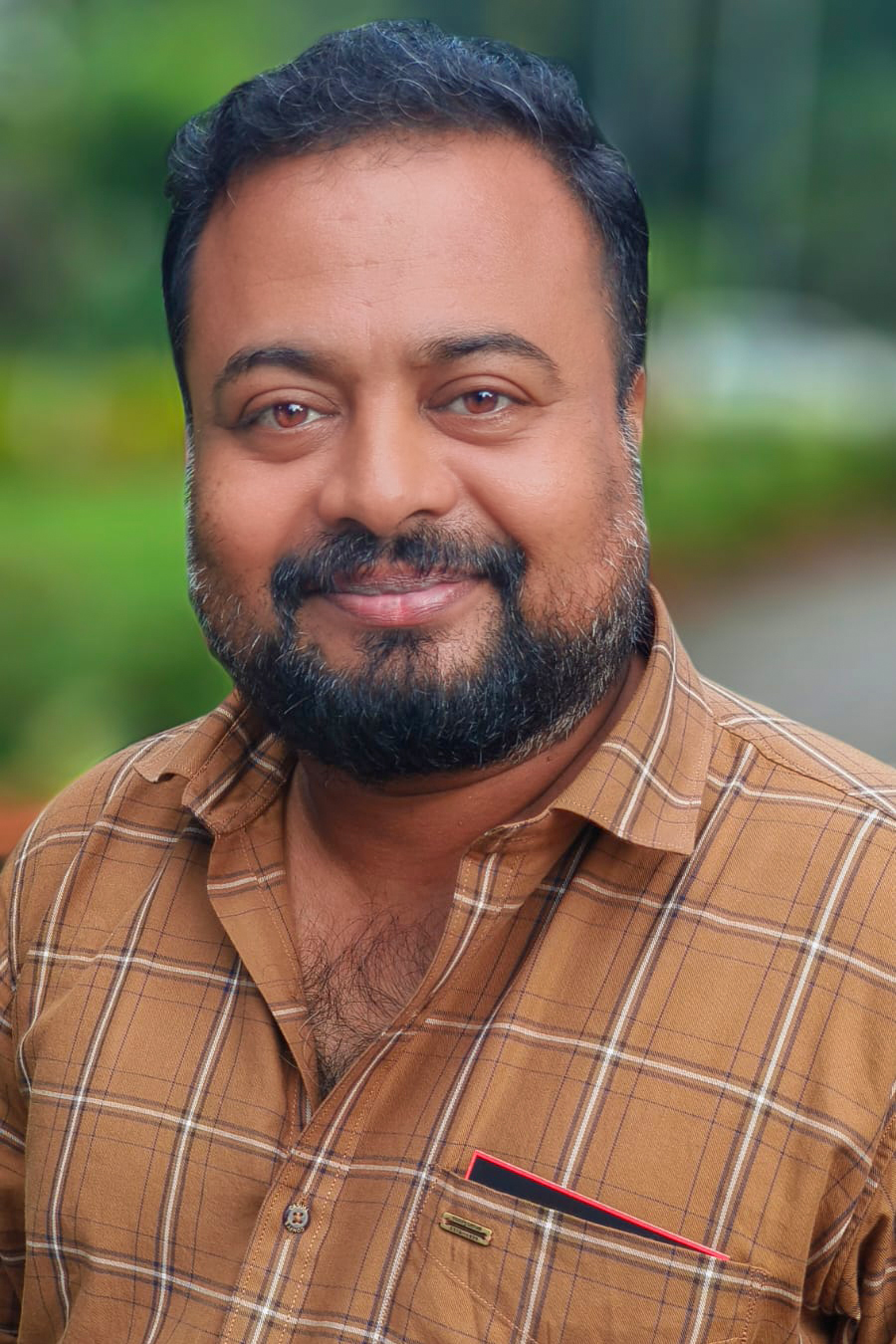
- Born: 18 December 1978 (age 47); Kochi, India
- Other names: Sohan, Seenulal
- Education: MG University, Pune University
- Occupations: Director, actor and screenwriter
- Years active: 2001–present

Sohanlal P. S. (born 18 December 1978), better known by his screen name Sohan Seenulal, is an Indian film director, screenwriter, and actor who works in Malayalam cinema. He is known for his character roles in films.

== Career ==
Sohan Seenulal began his career as a child actor with a role in Kabooliwala (1994), directed by Siddique–Lal. He later worked as an assistant director under Shafi, beginning with One Man Show (2001). He continued to serve as an assistant director on several films until 2008, including Lollipop (2008), starring Prithviraj Sukumaran.

Seenulal made his directorial debut in 2011 with Doubles, starring Mammootty. He subsequently directed Vanyam (2016), featuring Aparna Nair in the lead role. His upcoming directorial venture, Unlocked, stars Chemban Vinod Jose, Mamta Mohandas, and Sreenath Bhasi.

As an actor, Seenulal made his debut in the role of Constable Madhu in Action Hero Biju, directed by Abrid Shine.

His short film Cupid received the Second Best Short Film award at the Indiavision Short Film Festival, while Seenulal won the Best Screenwriter award for the film at the First ALA Short Film Festival. His feature film Vanyam was also recognized with the Best Director award at the Shanthadevi Puraskaram in Kozhikode.

== Filmography ==
Year	Title	Role	Notes
2001	One Man Show	junior artist	Uncredited
2016	Action Hero Biju	Civil Police Officer Madhu	
2016	Puthiya Niyamam	Asst. Adv. Baburaj	
2016	Kolumittayi		
2016	Thoppil Joppan	Mathan	
2016	Kuttikalundu Sookshikkuka	Nandakumar	
2016	Ore Mukham		
2017	Karutha Joothan		
2017	Sathya		
2017	The Great Father	Gokuldas	
2017	Munthirivallikal Thalirkkumbol	Babu	
2017	C/O Saira Banu		
2017	Puthan Panam	Sathyan	
2017	Honey Bee 2: Celebrations		
2017	Achayans	Lakshmana	
2017	Pullikkaran Staraa	Mayur	
2018	Street Lights		
2018	Kinar		
2018	Parole		
2018	Kuttanadan Marpappa	ICD Card Executive	
2018	Chanakya Thanthram	Vijay	
2018	Abrahaminte Santhathikal	SI Varghese	
2018	Panchavarnathatha		
2018	Oru Kuttanadan Blog	Peter	
2018	Ankarajyathe Jimmanmar	Jithu Anthikkad	
2018	Oru Pazhaya Bomb Kadha		
2019	Idukki Blasters		
2019	Neeyum Njanum	Const. Joseph	
2019	Mafi Dona	Col. Chacko	
2019	Thelivu	Sumesh	
2019	Driving Licence	Anandhu Panicker	
2019	Unda	Police officer	
2021	The Priest	Sabu	
2022	Velleppam		
2022	Bro Daddy	Kurian's office manager	
2023	Khali purse of billionaires	Benny chettan	
2023	Kurukkan	Neenu's neighbour	
2023	Nadhikalil Sundari Yamuna	Prabhakaran	
2024	Iyer in Arabia	Fasal	
2024	Bharathanatyam	Madhu	
2024	Pushpaka Vimanam		
2025	Mother Mary		
2025	Mr & Mrs Bachelor		
2025	Thalavara		
2025	Pongala		
2025	Khajuraho Dreams	Sujanapala Devanouka Mourya	
2025	Mindiyum Paranjum	Manoj	
2025	Haal		
2026	Bhishmar		
2026	Sathyameva †	TBA	ZEE5 series
