= Pauly Valsan =

Indian Actress

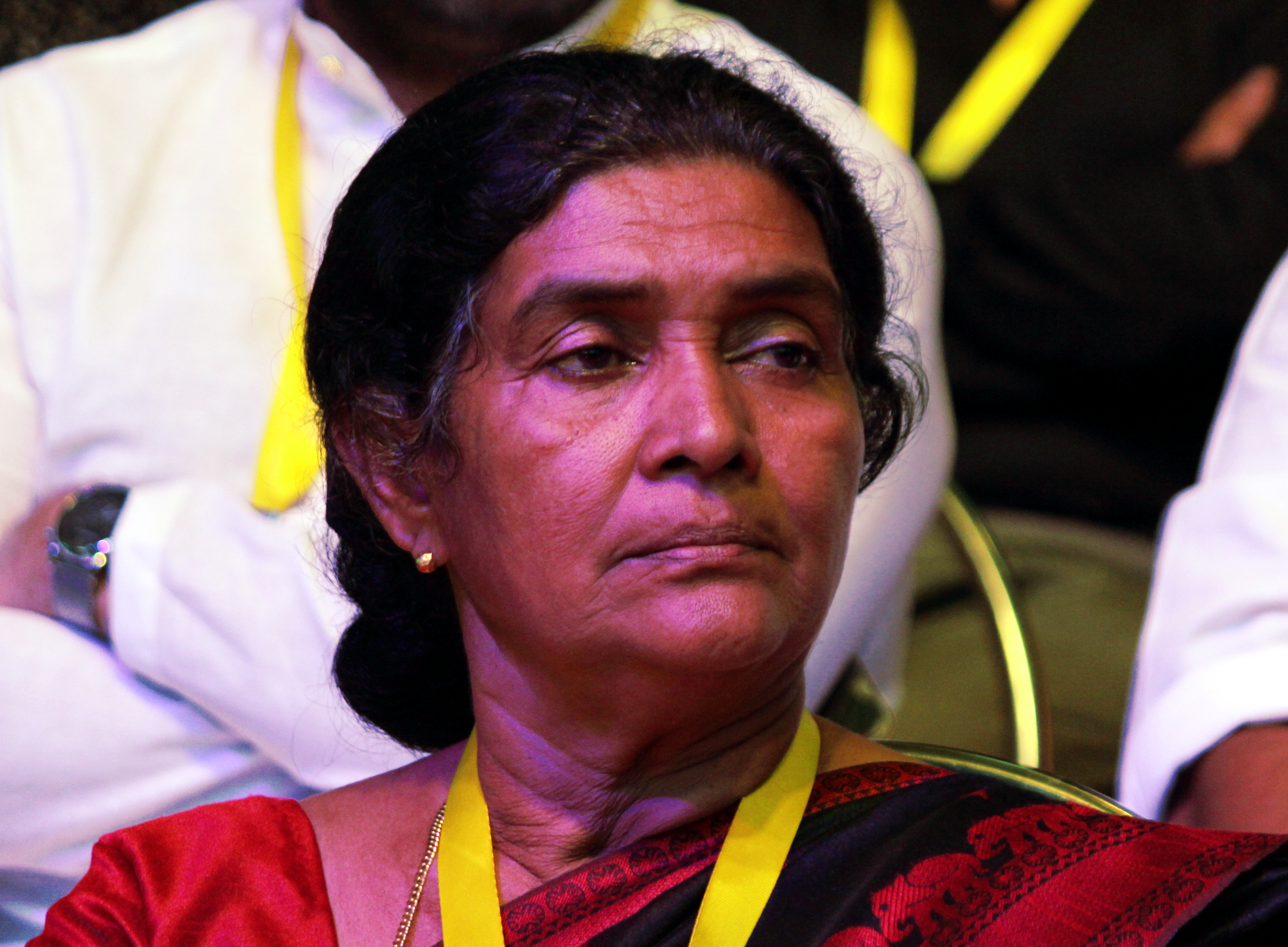
- Valsan at the 48th Kerala State Film Awards Distribution Ceremony.
- Born: Ernakulam, Kerala, India
- Occupation: Actress
- Years active: 1975–present
- Spouse: Valsan
- Children: 2
- Awards: Kerala State Film Awards

Pauly Valsan is an Indian actress who has been acclaimed for acting in Malayalam films and plays. She debuted in Malayalam film industry with the supporting roles in the 2008 movie Annan Thambi In 2017, she won the Kerala State Film Award for Best Character Actress for her performance in Ee.Ma.Yau directed by Lijo Jose Pellissery and Ottamuri Velicham directed by Rahul Riji Nair. In 2022, she won Kerala State Film Award for Best Dubbing Artist.

== Personal life ==
Pauly Valsan hails from Vypin, Kochi, India from an extended fisherman family, she is the eldest one in the family and have six siblings. She began her acting career through theatre plays as a child artist. Her husband Valsan is also a theatre artist. The couple have two children.

== Acting career ==
Pauly Valsan begin her acting career with theatre plays on early 1970s, and later in 2008 Pauly debuted on Malayalam movie Annan Thambi under the direction of Anwar Rasheed and starring Mammootty.

== Filmography ==
Year	Title	Role	Notes
2008	Annan Thambi	Peethambaran's aunt	Debut
2011	Beautiful	House maid	
2013	Annayum Rasoolum	Kunjamma	
2013	5 Sundarikal	Molly	Segment:Kullante Bharya
2013	Daivathinte Swantham Cleetus	Kochappu's wife	
2014	Praise the Lord	Karthiyayani	
2014	Manglish	Veronica	
2014	Iyobinte Pusthakam	Thresya	
2015	Saaradhi	Patient's relative	
2015	Acha Dhin	Security's wife	
2015	Love 24×7	Canteen staff	
2015	Amar Akbar Anthony	Fish seller	
2016	Leela	Aleyamma	
2016	Anuraga Karikkin Vellam	Corporation cleaning lady	
2016	Pa Va	Pulimoottil housemaid	
2016	Guppy	Molly	
2016	Vanyam	Susheela	
2016	Welcome to Central Jail	Lady Jailer	
2016	Kattappanayile Rithwik Roshan	Upadeshi thalla	
2016	Kappiri Thuruthu	Chettathi	
2017	Pareeth Pandari	Accamma	
2017	C/O Saira Banu	Radhamma	
2017	Georgettan's Pooram	Vava's mother-in-law	
2017	Rakshadhikari Baiju Oppu	Sweeper	
2017	Paippin Chuvattile Pranayam	Babumon's Mother	
2017	Ottamuri Velicham	Mother of Chandran	Kerala State award for best character actress
2017	Thira Pole	Lady at hospital	Short film
2017	Adam Joan		
2017	Kalyanarathri		
2017	Karuna		
2018	Shikkari Shambhu	Vasudevan's mother	
2018	Ee.Ma.Yau	Pennamma	Kerala state award for best character actress
2018	Koode	Kochuthressiamma	
2018	Mangalyam Thanthunanena	Thressiamma's mother	
2018	Dakini	Molly	
2018	French Viplavam		
2018	Kunju Daivam	Shibu's mother	
2018	Ladoo	Servant	
2018	Premasoothram	Pallan Suni's wife	
2018	Sukhamano Daveede	School peon	
2018	Kinavalli		
2018	Iblis	Kannari	
2018	A Live Story	Prasannakumaran's mother	Short film
2019	An International Local Story	Kunjaroy's wife	
2019	Mr. & Ms. Rowdy	Hostel warden	
2019	Luca	Salomi	
2019	Brother's Day	Valyammachi	
2019	Vikruthi	Reethamma	
2019	Adhyarathri	Thresiamma	
2019	Thelivu	Amminiamma	
2019	Under World	Nurse	
2019	Varthakal Ithuvare	Thithiri chettathi	
2019	Isakkinte Ithihasam	Johnykutty's mother	
2019	Ulta	Kadatthanattu Madhaviamma	
2019	Anan		
2020	Kozhipporu	Mary	
2020	Make Over	Voice only	Short film
2020	Sit Down		Short film
2020	Holy Moly		Short film
2020	Pauly Chechi		Documentary
2020	Kilometers and Kilometers	Kuttan's amma	
2021	Drishyam 2	Mother of Jose	
2021	Elizabeth	Mercy aunty	Short film
2021	Nallonakkalam		Album
2021	Home	Frankin's attender	
2021	Kaaval	Ponnamma	
2021	Minutes		Short film
2021	A		Short film
2021	Sumesh and Ramesh	Mary	
2021	Star	Sweeper	
2021	Minnal Murali	Villager	
2021	Kolaambi	Alphonse	
2021	Djibouti	Sijoy's mother	
2021	Oru Vaka Idavaka	Paropakaram Saramma	Webseries
2022	Meppadiyan	Vendor Mary	
2022	Thirimali	Peter's mother	
2022	Bheeshma Parvam	Pauly Thathi	
2022	Peace		
2022	Appan	Kuttyamma	
2022	Kooman	Giri's mother	
2022	Jermisinte Darshanam	Saly Thekkethil	Short film
2022	Dare Devil	Aneesh's mother	Short film
2022	Innalekal		
2022	Shalamon		
2023	2018	Mary Thomas	
2023	Pulimada	Valyammachi	
2023	Somante Krithavu	Vayattatti	
2024	Panchayath Jetty		
2024	Chithini		
2025	Rekhachithram	Vincent's Aunt	
2026	Thudakkam	Pauly Chechi	
2026	Ottam Thullal		
2026	Avaraachan & Sons		
2026	Chevittorma	Thresia	
Rachel †	TBA		

=== Dubbing ===
Year	Title of the Movie	Dubbed for	Notes
2022	Saudi Vellakka	Devi Varma	

== TV career ==
TV shows

- Star Singer season 8- Promo (Asianet)
- Ente Katha
- Comedy Stars
- The Happiness Project
- Funny Nights with Pearle Maaney
- Onnum Onnum Moonu
- Panam Tharum Padam
- Super Kudumbam
- Tharapakittu

TV serials

- Meenu's Kitchen (Mazhavil Manorama)
- Snehakoottu (Asianet)
- Panchavadippalam (Flowers TV)
- Kasthooriman (Asianet)
- John Jaffer Janardhan (Surya TV)
- Adichu Mone (Flowers TV)
- Parasparam (Asianet)

== Dramas ==
- Snehithare Sookshikkuka
- Makarakoithu
- Swantham Karyam Zindabadh
- Sabarmathi

== Awards ==
=== Kerala State Film Awards ===
- 2017-Kerala State Film Award for Second Best Actress - Ottamuri Velicham. &. Ee.Ma.Yau
- 2022-Kerala State Film Award for Best Dubbing Artist - Saudi Vellakka
