= Kalla Nottam =

- Official poster
- Directed by: Rahul Riji Nair
- Starring: Vasudev; Suryadev; Ansu
- Release dates: 2019 (National Film Awards/Kerala State Film Awards); 24 July 2020 (New York Indian Film Festival)
- Country: India
- Language: Malayalam

Kalla Nottam (released internationally as The False Eye) is a 2019 Indian Malayalam language coming-of-age drama film directed by Rahul Riji Nair starring Vasudev, Suryadev, and Ansu.

== Cast ==
- Vasudev Sajeesh Marar as Vincent
- Suryadev Sajeesh Marar as Kishore
- Ansu Maria as Rosy
- Vinitha Koshy as Neenu

== Production ==
The film was made without a script.

== Reception ==
Sajin Shrijith of The New Indian Express opined that "Kalla Nottam is that rare coming-of-age drama which proves aesthetics don't matter much when the content is strong. I initially expected it to be something innocent and light-hearted, but I found the slightly dark direction it took later so refreshing. I didn't see some of the surprises coming. This is one of the best Malayalam films of this year". Cris of The News Minute wrote that "If the last 15 minutes or so of the short-length feature (1 hour 10 minutes) had been different, Kalla Nottam would have been a wonderful little package". Nirmal Jovial of The Week said that "Kalla Nottam is a brilliantly scripted film, executed with minimal resources. The finest performers (after the digital camera) are undoubtedly the three child artistes". G. Ragesh of onManorama wrote that "Its unconventional way of story-telling, made possible with an innovative cinematography, makes it an engaging watch even as unfolding a simple but relevant plot.

== Awards and nominations ==
The film won the Best Feature Film in Malayalam at the National Film Awards. The film was nominated for Best Screenplay and Best Child Artist at the New York Indian Film Festival. Vasudev Sajeesh Marar won Best Child Artist at the Kerala State Film Awards.
