= Niranj Maniyanpilla Raju =

Malayalam film actor

Niranj
- Born: Thiruvananthapuram, Kerala, India
- Occupation: Actor
- Years active: 2013 – present
- Spouse: Niranjana Vinod Paliath
- Parents: Maniyanpilla Raju; Indira

Niranj Maniyanpilla Raju or Niranj is an Indian actor who works in the Malayalam film industry. Niranj is the younger son of veteran actor and producer Maniyanpilla Raju.

== Personal life ==
Niranj was born to actor and producer Maniyanpilla Raju and Indira. He has an elder brother Sachin.

== Filmography ==
Key
†	Denotes films that have not yet been released

Year	Title	Role	Ref.
2013	Black Butterfly	Deepak	Debut film
2017	Bobby	Bobby	
2018	Drama	Jomon John Chacko	
2018	Sakalakalashala	Akbar Salaam/ Akku	
2019	Soothrakkaran	Sreejith Prabhakaran / Sreekuttan	
2019	Finals	Manuel	
2021	Oru Thathvika Avalokanam	Nandakumar aka Nandu	
2022	Vivaha Avahanam	Arun	
2022	Kakkipada	Akshay	
2023	Dear Vaappi	Riyaz	
2023	Madhura Manohara Moham	Disney James	
2023	Achan Oru Vazha Vechu	Prathyush	
2024	Gu	Mitran	
2024	Thrayam		
2026	Masthishka Maranam	Bimal Raj	

=== Television ===
Year	Title	Role	Language	Network	Notes	Ref.
2025	The Chronicles of the 4.5 Gang	Althaf	Malayalam	SonyLIV		
