= Chevittorma =

2026 Indian Malayalam language film

Chevittorma The Soul Whisperer
- Directed by: Leo Thaddeus
- Starring: Dileesh Pothan; Pauly Valsan
- Cinematography: Swaroop Shanker
- Edited by: Carlo Francisco Manatad
- Music by: Milad Movahedi
- Release date: 2026
- Running time: 95 minutes
- Country: India
- Language: Malayalam

Chevittorma also titled as The Soul Whisperer is a 2026 Indian Malayalam-language drama film written and directed by Leo Thaddeus. The film stars Dileesh Pothan and Pauly Valsan in the lead roles. The film had its world premiere at the 31st Busan International Film Festival in South Korea in October 2026, where it was screened in the A Window on Asian Cinema section.

== Plot ==
In some Christian communities in Kerala, certain individuals visit the homes of people nearing death to offer prayers and spiritual support. Known as Chevittorma, the practice involves whispering a prayer into the ear of a dying person who is unable to recite it themselves. Theresia is one such woman, who is summoned to the ancestral home of Payyammal Varkichan, a wealthy landlord who has fallen seriously ill. Although all the family members are waiting for his demise, it does not happen. The film unfolds through the problems that follow.

== Cast ==
- Pauly Valsan as Thresia
- Dileesh Pothan as Varkey (Payyamnal Varkichan)

== Development ==
The film Chevittorma is Leo Thaddeus's directorial debut in independent cinema. The cinematography is by Swaroop Shanker, and edited by French based filmmaker Carlo Francisco Manatad, marking his first Indian feature film. The film's musical score was composed by Iranian composer Milad Movahedi.

The film is produced under the banners of Australian company Stop Winning Films, Lovely Frames, Uncombed Buddha and S4 Cinemas. The film is produced by Lokan Ravi, Jacob Zacharias, Aditya Grover, Harsh Agarwal and Sajan Balan under the leadership of creative producer and script editor Stephen Zacharias. The co-producers are Eighth Day Productions, Girelli Productions, Verite Pictures and Tournag Productions.

== Film festival selections ==
Chevittorma was selected for the 31st Busan International Film Festival, held in South Korea from 6 to 15 October 2026. It was included in the festival's A Window on Asian Cinema section and had its world premiere on 8 October 2026.

The film was selected for the Dharamshala International Film Festival in 2026, following its world premiere at the Busan. It is also selected to the international competition section of the 31st International Film Festival of Kerala.

== Reception ==
Anandu Suresh of The Indian Express rated the film 3.5 out of 5 stars, describing it as a haunting atmospheric drama exploring generational trauma and praised the performances of Dileesh Pothan and Pauly Valsan.
