= The Mango People =

2015 Malayalam language Film

- Directed by: Saketh Sreemohan
- Written by: Saketh Sreemohan
- Produced by: Sumi Sreemohan; Dr. I S Sreemohan
- Starring: Savithri Sreedharan; Kaarthik Shankar; Nithya Sri; Amar Ramesh; Rajasekharan
- Cinematography: Saketh Sreemohan
- Edited by: Kaarthik Shankar; Aravind Raja; Saketh Sreemohan
- Music by: Girish Kumar
- Production companies: Commixing; Yali Studios
- Release date: 2 May 2015
- Running time: 36 minutes
- Country: India
- Language: Malayalam

The Mango People is a 2015 Malayalam satirical comedy-drama short film written and directed by Saketh Sreemohan starring Savithri Sreedharan, Kaarthik Shankar, and Nithya Sri in the lead. The movie is about "the ordinary lives of three extraordinary characters" and the relationship between them. Mango People is the extraordinary, new-generation way of calling the ordinary people (or Aam Aadmi in Hindi. Aam also means Mango). This is the idea behind the title, The Mango People, which is an ordinary tale of some extraordinary people.

The short film was released on YouTube on 2 May 2015 to positive reviews and high viewership count.

== Cast ==
- Savithri Sreedharan as Sarojini Nair
- Kaarthik Shankar as Rajan
- Nithya Sri as Latha
- Amar Ramesh as Sarojini Nair's son
- Rajasekharan as The Manager

== Production ==
The story was conceived two years before the actual shooting for the movie began. Screenwriting started in October 2013 was completed in January 2014. The first draft of the script was actually meant for a two-hour-long feature film which was then cut-short to fit the 30 minute time frame. The lead actors were confirmed one month before the shooting. Savithri Sreedharan (acting as the title role, Sarojini Nair) is a drama-artist from Kozhikode, Kerala who has won many awards (including the State Award) for her performances. Kaarthik Shankar (attributed as Vishal Shiv Prabhu in the short film) is the director of short films such as Sharikal Mathram, Daivam, Oru Valiya Sathyam, and Puthiya Thudakkam

Principal photography began on 28 February 2014 in and around Kozhikode city and went on for 10 days. The number of people in the crew was kept to a minimum and the shoot was planned extensively to prevent delays. A promo song, made entirely of Jagathy Sreekumar's dialogues was composed by Vishal Kuja Prabhu while shooting. Nithya Sri completed all her scenes in the first schedule which was wrapped up in four days. But one particular scene had to be re-shot and the climax was changed during the second schedule shoot which delayed the movie a little bit. Post-production started mid-March and was completed by April first week. The movie faced some serious technical troubles in the following months and had to undergo a second round of editing and colour correction which delayed the release. The official YouTube is scheduled for 2 May 2015 . Posters and a Facebook page was launched on 10 February 2015. A teaser trailer was launched online on 12 April 2015.

== Reception ==
The film was released on 2 May 2015 directly on YouTube and met with widespread critical acclaim. With over 40,000 views in two weeks it was featured in Mathrubhumi paper's "YouTubed" column as the "Most Watched Short Film of the Week". The performances of the three lead actors and the screenplay of the movie were highly appreciated.
