= Georgettan's Pooram =

2017 Indian film

- Directed by: K. Biju
- Screenplay by: Y. V. Rajesh
- Story by: K Biju
- Produced by: Arun Gosh; Bijoy Chandran; Shivanee Suraj
- Starring: Dileep; Rajisha Vijayan; Chemban Vinod Jose; Renji Panicker; Vinay Forrt; Sharaf U Dheen
- Narrated by: Innocent
- Cinematography: Vinod Illampally
- Edited by: Lijo Paul
- Music by: Gopi Sundar
- Production companies: Chand V Creations; Shivanee Entertainment
- Distributed by: Chand V Creations
- Release date: 1 April 2017
- Country: India
- Language: Malayalam

Georgettan's Pooram (transl. Georgettan's Festival) is a 2017 Indian Malayalam action comedy sports film directed by K. Biju, starring Dileep in title role, with Rajisha Vijayan, Chemban Vinod Jose, Renji Panicker, Sharaf U Dheen and Vinay Forrt in lead roles. The screenplay is written by Y. V. Rajesh based on a story by Biju. It is produced by Arun Gosh and Bijoy Chandran under the banner of Shivani Entertainments and Chand V Creations.

== Plot ==
Playing for India, P. V. Mathai won a gold medal at the 1990 Asian Games in Beijing. As one of the first Malayalis from his district, Thrissur, to win a gold medal, he received a hero's welcome from the people in his area. He gifted the local youth a playground and a sports club, which was named Mathaiparambu. Mathai died in a road accident and the people built a statue in his honour in Mathaiparambu. Soon afterwards, the people forgot the ground's initial use as a sports ground, and the place became a place for the youth to loiter around and play football.

Vava, Pallan and Thankan are three boys who loiter around on Mathaiparambu. Their parents are annoyed and Vava's father tells Fr. Mathews Vadakkan, a local Mar Thoma priest to set them on the right path and he grants his son George this responsibility. After class one day, the three boys find George peeping through the bathroom, and catch him doing this. After this incident, they say that George is their leader and is one of them.

Years later, George, Vava, Pallan and Thankan are still loitering around the ground doing nothing. They have a small gathering on top of a small tower in Mathaiparambu, where Joseph "Josephettan", a local beggar who takes only Rs. 10 from the poor box near Jesus' statue and from Georgettan, welcomes them like his own children. Fr. Vadakkan is disappointed in his son George and wants him to become a bishop. George tries to impress his father by doing various things in the community, but each activity ends in disaster.

Later, two people come and ask for the gang's permission of starting a driving school in Mathaiparambu. Although at first reluctant, they agree immediately when the two explain that it is a ladies' driving school. However, they are disappointed when they see old women in the school. Then they hear the sad news of the death of a local MLA and a funeral is held by his son Simon. There, George meets Merlin, a singer, and instantly falls in love. He is disappointed at the fact that he does not know anything about her, not even her name (he did not find this out). Him and his friends decide to go to their house the next day to find out anything about her, but this ends in disaster.

The next day, Vava explains that he has a proposal. George and his friends decide to go with him, but he drops off his brother Jose at the local convent school, as their father now wants Jose to become a bishop, much to George's delight. There George plays a game of carroms against Kichu, places a bet of Rs. 2000 but loses the bet. After, he goes with Vava to the marriage proposal and George takes Rs. 2000 from the girl's dad and gives it to Kichu, angering the dad. He cancels the proposal between the two.

George goes and decides to stop the driving school at Mathaiparambu, as he is disappointed at the fact that there are only old women coming. Right afterwards Merlin comes, and George decides to let the driving school carry on. The driving school teacher tells George that she is going to become a nun which her mother insisted, as she said that she does not have the three qualities a girl needs to have: desire, wish and love. George finds her desiring for and eating a nellikka, and tells her that he has proven she has one of the three qualities. George, after joining a class at the convent school, is saved by Merlin after a priest asks him questions. George understands this and tells her that he has proven the second of the three qualities, as she saved him in front of the priest.

As they leave the convent school, the gang meet a bunch of youths smoking weed outside. George gets angry over this and starts a fight. As the fight ends, Fr. Vadakkan slaps George, as Fr. Vadakkan is disappointed even more in him. He goes to Mathaiparambu, but unexpectedly, his mother Mercykutty comes to visit him. She suggests to George that he should never enter the house.

The next day, the locals gather to find some construction on Mathaiparambu. George and his friends goes and finds Peter, who explains that he is the son of P.V Mathai and that Mathaiparambu is his. They go to Fr. Vadakkan's church and fight the case out there with the priest, where Peter seems to be favored. In retaliation, George and his gang decide to set up a stray dog conservation scheme on Mathaiparambu, which ends in disaster, ruining George's name in the land. Peter then meets George and attempts to gain George's trust by saying that he is ready to give Mathaiparambu away and leave it to waste. George is saddened and says that he is ready to accept any of Peter's demands. Peter suggests that they start a kabaddi team, which George accepts. They train and play against a team and won. The next day, they find Josephettan dead in ground. And a group of Christians are telling that Josephettan is not Christian so he cannot be buried in the church. This make George angry and he decide to bury Josephettan in Mathaayiparambu. George realises that Josephettan was actually killed by Peter.

After that George confronts Peter about this and Peter threatens him. George and his friends leave Peter's kabaddi team and start a new one of their own to play against Peter. They finally win against him and Peter is arrested for Joseph's murder

== Cast ==
- Dileep as George Vadakkan
  - Dhananjay as Young George
- Rajisha Vijayan as Merlin, George's love interest
- Chemban Vinod Jose as Peter V. Mathai
- Renji Panicker as Fr. Mathews Vadakkan, George's father
- Vinay Forrt as Vava, George's friend
- Sharaf U Dheen as Pallan, George's friend
- Thiru Actlab as Churulan, George's friend
- Jeevan Gopal as Jose Vadakkan
- Kalaranjini as Mercy, George's mother
- T.G. Ravi as Joseph "Josephettan"
- Ganapathi S. Poduval as Kitchu
- Sudheer Karamana as Simon
- Harikrishnan as Ramesh
- Hareesh Kanaran as Tea Vaasu, Tea Shop Owner
- Assim Jamal as M. Anil
- Malavika Nair as Vava's Wife
- Grace Antony as Pallan's Wife
- Sunil Sukhada as Vava's father
- Pauly Valsan as Vava's mother-in-law
- Shaju Shridhar as CI Shaji John

== Box office ==
The film collected $114,287 from UAE box office in its two weekends and $6,797 from UK box office.
