= Vinitha Koshy =

Indian actress

- Born: Kallada, Kollam, Kerala, India
- Occupation: Actress
- Years active: 2015 - present

Vinitha Koshy is an Indian actress who made her debut with the 2016 film Aanandam. She won the Kerala State Film Award – Special Jury Award for her performance in Ottamuri Velicham (2017). She has also appeared in the films Aby (2017), Luca (2019) and in highest grossing Malayalam film 2018 (2023).

== Early life ==
Vinitha Koshy was born in Kallada, Kollam, Kerala. She worked at Father Muller college of nursing mangalore and later as a pediatric counsellor at Mount Elizabeth Medical Centre, Singapore from 2014 to 2016.

== Filmography ==
=== Film ===
Year	Title	Role	Notes
2016	Aanandam	Lovely Miss	
2017	Aby	Clara	
2017	Ottamuri Velicham	Sudha	48th Kerala State Film Awards - Special Jury Award for acting Nominated for best actress - NYIFF 2018
2019	Luca	Fathimah	
2020	Kalla Nottam	Neenu	
2021	Operation Java	Shruthi	
2021	PAKA (River of Blood)	Anna	Premiered at the 2021 Toronto International Film Festival in Discovery Section.
2023	Christopher	Seena	
2023	2018	Pregnant lady	
TBA	Jwalamukhi	Reshmi	

=== Music videos ===
Year	Title		Composer	Language	Singer(s)	Lyrics	Ref(s)
2017	"Mounam Sollum Varthaigal"		Sidhartha Pradeep	Tamil	Amrita Jayakumar, Nithin Raj	Jayakumar N	
2018	Laksha	"Premam Alle"	Srikanth KVB	Malayalam	Vineeth Sreenivasan	Rajesh Ramachandran	
2018	Laksha	"Kadhal Thaane"	Srikanth KVB	Tamil	Sathyaprakash	VJ Vedharaman	
2018	Laksha	"Premenaa"	Srikanth KVB	Telugu	Sriram Subramanian		
2018	Laksha	"Preethi Thaane"	Srikanth KVB	Kannada	Keshav Vinod	Lokeshgouda Joladarashi	
2018	Laksha	"Ishq Haina"	Srikanth KVB	Hindi	Abhay Jodhpurkar	Rajagopalan Ganesan	
