= Rajisha Vijayan =

Indian actress

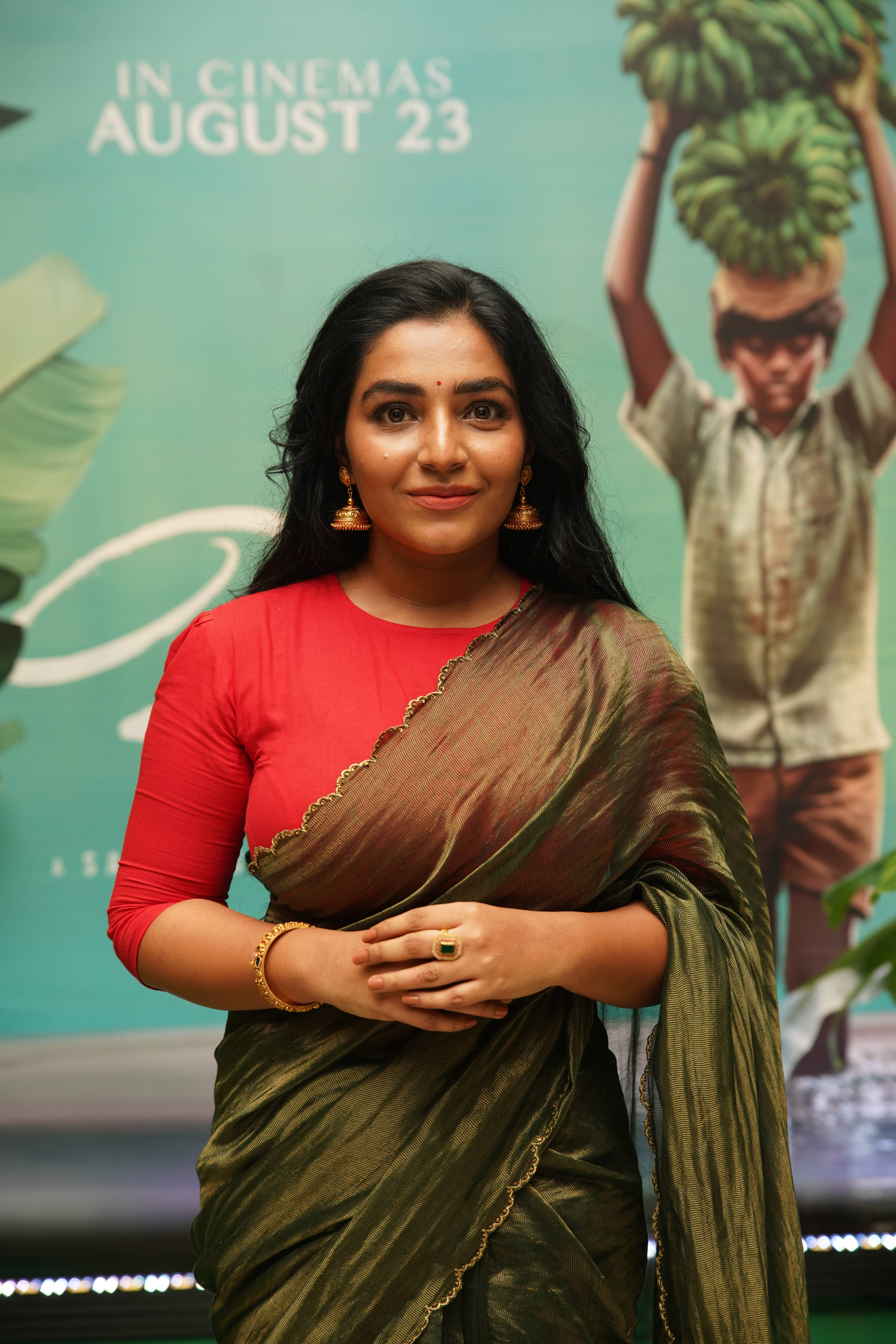
- Rajisha Vijayan at Vaazhai audio launch
- Born: Kozhikode, Kerala, India
- Education: Amity University, Noida
- Occupation: Actress
- Years active: 2016–present

Rajisha Vijayan is an Indian actress, who primarily works in Malayalam and Tamil films. Rajisha is best known for Anuraga Karikkin Vellam(2016), June(2019), Karnan(2021) and Jai Bhim(2021). She is a recipient of the Kerala State Film Award for Best Actress.

== Early life and education ==
Rajisha Vijayan was born in Perambra, Kozhikode, Kerala, India and was raised across North India in an army household. She graduated in Mass Communication and Journalism from Amity University, Noida.

== Career ==
Rajisha Vijayan debuted in the Malayalam film Anuraga Karikkin Vellam. She won the Kerala State Film Award for Best Actress in 2016 for the role.

She gained further prominence with her performance in the coming-of-age drama June (2019), which was both a critical and commercial success. Her nuanced portrayal of the titular character was widely praised and solidified her reputation as one of the leading actresses in Malayalam cinema. This was followed by Khoo-Kho (2021).

She starred in Tamil films such as Karnan (2021) and the Sardar film series (2022-2025). She played the lead in the short film Kovarty (2025), which premiered at the MAMI Mumbai Film Festival. Her upcoming projects include Masthishkamaranam.

She has been featured in the Kochi Times Most Desirable Woman list three times; in 2017, 2019, and 2020.

== Filmography ==
=== Films ===
Key
†	Denotes films that have not yet been released

Year	Title	Role	Language	Notes	Ref.
2016	Anuraga Karikkin Vellam	Elizabeth Prakash "Eli"	Malayalam	Debut film	
2017	Georgettan's Pooram	Merlin	Malayalam		
2017	Oru Cinemakkaran	Sara Elsa Thomas	Malayalam		
2019	June	June Sara Joy	Malayalam		
2019	Finals	Alice Varghese	Malayalam		
2019	Stand Up	Diya	Malayalam		
2020	Love	Deepthi	Malayalam		
2021	Kho Kho	Maria Francis	Malayalam		
2021	Ellam Sheriyakum	Ancy Chacko	Malayalam		
2021	Karnan	Draupathi	Tamil		
2021	Jai Bhim	Mythra	Tamil		
2022	Sardar	Indhrani	Tamil		
2022	Ramarao on Duty	Malini	Telugu		
2022	Freedom Fight	Geethu	Malayalam		
2022	Keedam	Radhika Balan	Malayalam		
2022	Malayankunju	Sandhya	Malayalam		
2023	Lovefully Yours Veda	Sree Veda	Malayalam		
2023	Pakalum Paathiravum	Mercy	Malayalam		
2023	Kolla	Annie	Malayalam		
2023	Madhura Manohara Moham	Meera Mohan	Malayalam		
2023	Amala	Amala	Malayalam	Cameo appearance	
2025	Bison Kaalamaadan	Raaji	Tamil		
2025	Kalamkaval	Divya	Malayalam		
2026	Masthishka Maranam	Frida Soman / Shalini Mullumurikkil	Malayalam		
2026	Sardar 2	Indhrani	Tamil	Cameo appearance	
2026	Bachelor Party D'eux	Simple	Malayalam		

== Awards and nominations ==
Year	Award	Category	Film	Result	Ref.
2016	Asianet Film Award	Best Star Pair (shared with Asif Ali)	Anuraga Karikkin Vellam	Won	
2017	2nd IIFA Utsavam	Best Actress - Malayalam	Anuraga Karikkin Vellam	Won	
2017	Kerala State Film Awards	Best Actress	Anuraga Karikkin Vellam	Won	
2017	South Indian International Movie Awards	Best Female Debut – Malayalam	Anuraga Karikkin Vellam	Won	
2020	Asianet Film Awards	Best Character Actress	Stand Up & Finals	Won	
2021	South Indian International Movie Awards	Best Actress - Malayalam	June	Nominated	
2022	South Indian International Movie Awards	Best Actress - Malayalam	Love	Nominated	
2022	South Indian International Movie Awards	Best Supporting Actress - Tamil	Jai Bhim	Nominated	
2022	South Indian International Movie Awards	Best Female Debut – Tamil	Karnan	Nominated	
