= Ottamuri Velicham =

2017 drama film by Rahul Riji Nair

- Movie Poster
- Directed by: Rahul Riji Nair
- Written by: Rahul Riji Nair
- Produced by: First Print Studios
- Starring: Deepak Parambol; Vinitha Koshy; Rajesh Sharma, Pauly Valsan; Renjit Shekar Nair
- Cinematography: Luke Jose
- Edited by: Appu N Bhattathiri
- Music by: Sidhartha Pradeep, Sheron Roy Gomez (Songs); Sidhartha Pradeep (Score)
- Production company: First Print Studios
- Release date: 2017
- Running time: 102 minutes
- Country: India
- Language: Malayalam

Ottamuri Velicham (English: Light in the Room) is a 2017 Indian Malayalam-language drama film written and directed by Rahul Riji Nair. It is produced under the banner of First Print Studios and has Vinitha Koshy and Deepak Parambol in the lead roles. The film unveils the journey of a newly wed girl who moves into a one-room shack in an isolated village with her husband. The film portrays the social issue of marital rape in India. The film won 4 awards at the 2017 Kerala State Film Awards, including Best Feature Film of the year. The film had its World Premiere at the New York Indian Film Festival on May 11, 2018. The film was released on Eros Now as an Original in November, 2018.

== Plot ==
Set against the backdrop of a hilltop village surrounded by dense forest and a decaying tea plantation, is the story of Sudha, an under privileged woman who reaches this village after her marriage with Chandran. They stay along with Chandran's brother and aging mother in a confined single room house with a makeshift separation to create space for the couple. The room has a strange light without a switch which changes its colours often. While Chandran calls the light his invention of a lifetime, it deprives Sudha of her privacy and begins to haunt her. Adding to her woes, Chandran engages in acts to physically exert his dominance over Sudha. Amidst deep trauma, Sudha realises that she doesn't have any support and decides to fight for her survival and seeks revenge against Chandran. Will Sudha succeed in her fight for freedom forms the crux of this emotional thriller.

== Cast ==
- Deepak Parambol as Chandran
- Vinitha Koshy as Sudha
- Rajesh Sharma as Jayan
- Pauly Valsan as Mother
- Renjit Shekar Nair as Ramesh

== Crew ==
- Story, Screenplay, Dialogue, Direction: Rahul Riji Nair
- Produced By: First Print Studios
- Executive Producers: Sujith Warrier, Zam Abdul Vahid
- DoP: Luke Jose
- Editor: Appu N Bhattathiri
- Music: Sidhartha Pradeep, Sheron Roy Gomez
- Background Score: Sidhartha Pradeep
- Lyrics: Linku Abraham, Gilu Joseph
- Art: Sidharth Jeevakumar
- Assistant Art Directors : Aishwarya Nandkumar, Sreelakshmi A
- Make-Up: Prabhakaran Poojapura
- Sound Design & Mixing: Anoop Kammaran (AK Music Studios), Shefin Mayan, Prasanth Sasidharan
- Costumes: Nithya Vijay, Devika S Nair
- Chief Associate: Jeevan Jos Kaitharath, Baiju V Nath

== Awards ==
Kerala State Film Awards 2017

- Kerala State Film Award for Best Film : Ottamuri Velicham
- Kerala State Film Award for Best Editor : Appu N Bhattathiri
- Kerala State Film Award for Best Character Actress : Pauly Valsan
- Kerala State Film Award - Special Jury Award : Vinitha Koshy

International Awards

- German Star of India [Best Feature Film], 15th Indian Film Festival Stuttgart, 2018
- Second Best Feature Film, Chicago South Asian Film Festival, 2018

Nominations

- Best Film, New York Indian Film Festival 2018
- Best Director, New York Indian Film Festival 2018
- Best Actress, New York Indian Film Festival 2018
- Director's Vision Award, 15th Indian Film Festival Stuttgart, 2018
- Oxfam Award for Best Film on Gender Equality, MAMI 2018

== Film festivals ==
- Winner, 15th Indian Film Festival Stuttgart
- Runner Up, Chicago South Asian Film Festival
- Official Selection (India Gold), Mumbai Film Festival (MAMI)
- Official Selection, New York Indian Film Festival 2018 (World Premiere)
- Official Selection, Imagine India International Film Festival, Madrid 2019
- Official Selection, Film Bazaar Recommends 2017
- Official Selection, Market Recommended - Dubai Film Market 2017

== Production ==
Principal photography commenced in June 2017 in Thiruvananthapuram, Kerala. The major portions of film is set against the backdrop of Bonacaud Tea Estate.
