= Finals (film) =

- Promotional poster
- Directed by: P. R. Arun
- Written by: P. R. Arun
- Produced by: Prajeev; Maniyanpilla Raju
- Starring: Rajisha Vijayan; Suraj Venjaramoodu; Niranj Maniyanpilla Raju
- Cinematography: Sudeep Elamon
- Edited by: Jith Joshie
- Music by: Kailas Menon
- Production company: Maniyanpilla Raju Productions
- Release date: 6 September 2019
- Running time: 150 minutes
- Country: India
- Language: Malayalam

Finals is a 2019 Indian Malayalam-language sports drama directed by Arun P. R. It stars Rajisha Vijayan, Suraj Venjaramoodu, and Niranj Maniyanpilla Raju. The film is based on real-life athletes.

== Premise ==
Alice, an elite cyclist and national champion, trains for the 2020 Summer Olympics with her disciplinarian father, Varghese, and childhood friend, Manuel.

== Cast ==
- Rajisha Vijayan as Alice Varghese
- Suraj Venjaramoodu as P. Varghese master, Alice's father
- Niranj Maniyanpilla Raju as Manuel Thomas
- Tini Tom as Thomas, Manuel's father
- Maniyan Pilla Raju as Sports Minister Siva Shankara Pillai
- Nisthar Sait as Rama Seshan
- Kunchan as Azees
- Mala Parvathi
- Muthumani as Wardha
- Sona Nair as Mini Thomas, Manuel's mother
- Dhruvan as Aadhi (cameo appearance)
- Milkha Singh as Himself (Cameo Appearance)

== Music ==
The songs were composed by Kailas Menon.

No.	Title	Singer(s)	Length
1.	"Nee Mazhavillu Polen"	Naresh Iyer, Priya Prakash Varrier	4:36
2.	"Manjukaalam"	Srinivas	4:42
3.	"Parakkam Parakkam"	Yazin Nizar, Latha Krishna	4:52
4.	"Chalaname"	Benny Dayal	3:38
Total length:			17:48

== Release ==
The Times of India gave the film a rating of three-and-half out of five stars and wrote that "The best part about Finals is how Arun succeeds to keep the audience guessing. Just when you think that the film will choose a predictable path, he somehow delightfully veers away". The New Indian Express gave the film a rating of four out of five stars and wrote that "Finals is, without a doubt, the best of all the four Onam releases. After being underwhelmed by the other three, I wanted an experience that's the equivalent of finding water in the middle of a scorching desert".
