= Rahul Riji Nair =

Indian film director

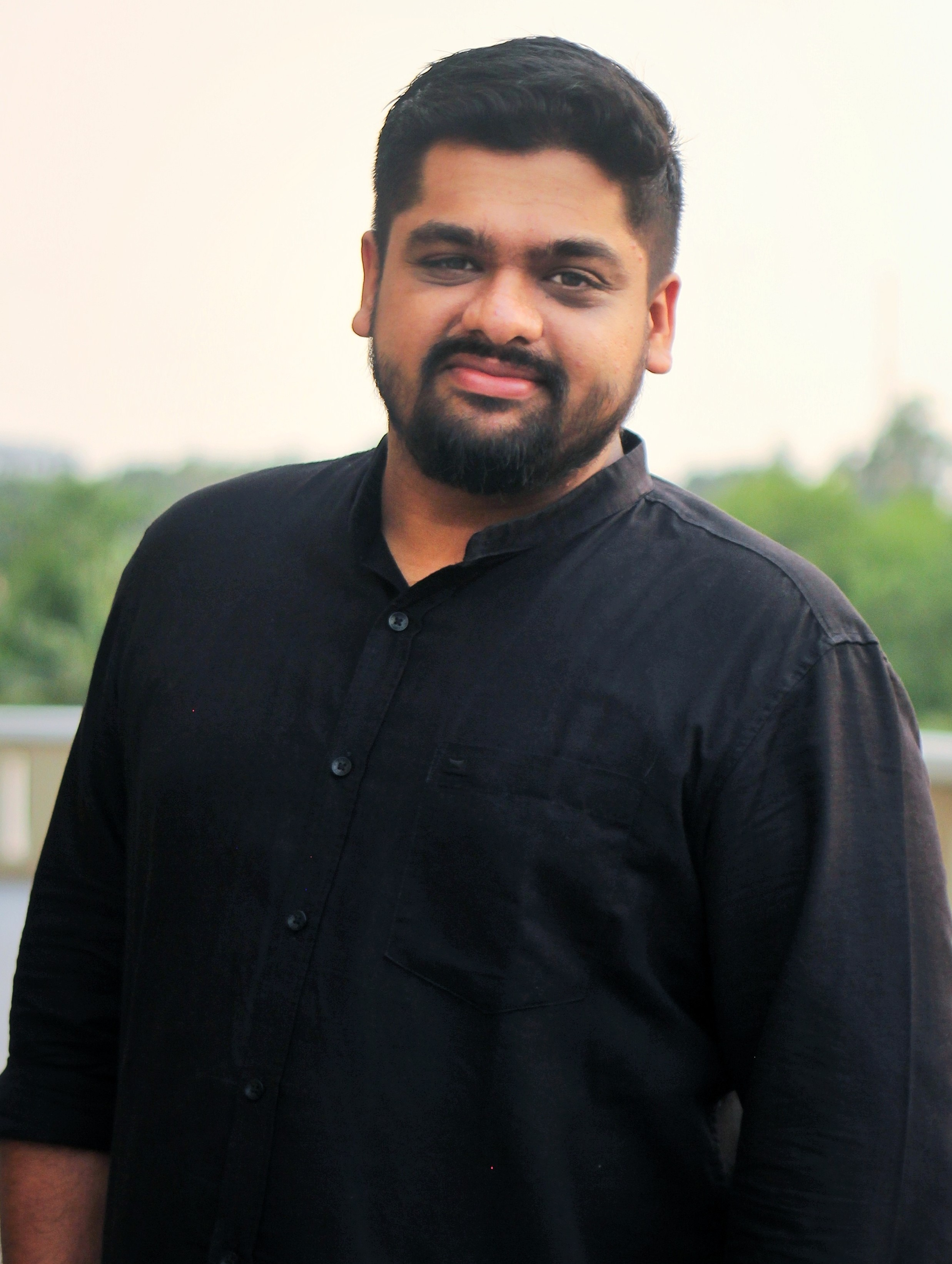
- Born: 21 March 1988 (age 38); Kollam, Kerala, India
- Occupations: Film director; scriptwriter; producer; actor; lyricist
- Years active: 2017–present
- Spouse: Nithya Vijay
- Parents: Dr. Riji G. Nair; Rajasree Nair
- Awards: National Film Awards; Kerala State Film Awards; Kerala Film Critics Award; Golden Royal Bengal Tiger Award

Rahul Riji Nair is an Indian film director, scriptwriter, producer and actor active in the Malayalam film industry. His debut feature film Ottamuri Velicham won 4 awards at the 2017 Kerala State Film Awards, including Best Feature Film. Rahul won the 67th National Film Awards for Best Malayalam Film in 2019 for his third feature film Kalla Nottam. Popular works in his filmography include Kho-Kho (2021), Keedam (2022) and Jai Mahendran (2024).

Rahul founded the production house First Print Studios in 2011. Through the company he has produced feature films, animation films and has pioneered the production of Malayalam streaming projects for global OTT platforms. He also distributes cinema under the banner of FPS Box office.

== Personal life ==
Rahul was born in Kollam, Kerala on 21 March 1988 to Dr. Riji G. Nair and Rajasree Nair. He did his schooling from SN Trusts Central School, Kollam and graduated in engineering from Amrita School of Engineering in 2009.

He worked as a Software Engineer and then as Marketing Manager with multiple companies in Technopark, Trivandrum before venturing into filmmaking. He is married to Nithya Vijay.

== Career ==
Rahul started his career in the Malayalam film industry in 2017 as the writer, producer and director of the Malayalam feature film Ottamuri Velicham. This film won 4 awards in Kerala State Film Awards 2017, including Best Feature Film of the year. His third feature film, Kalla Nottam won the 67th National Film Award for Best Malayalam Feature Film.

His films have premiered at prestigious film festivals in Mumbai, Kolkata, New York, Stuttgart, Chicago etc. He has also won multiple international wards including the prestigious Golden Royal Bengal Tiger Award for Best Feature Film at the 26th Kolkata International Film Festival and German Star of India Award for Best Feature film at the Indian Film Festival of Stuttgart.

Rahul pioneered the production of mainstream Web Series in Malayalam. He created the first Originals for Major OTT platforms like Disney+, Hotstar, and Sony LIV. He is noticed for his diverse body of work that has successfully traversed both Independent and Mainstream Cinema.

Rahul founded the production house First Print Studios in 2011 and is currently serving the company as its CEO. As a self taught filmmaker, he ventured into independent filmmaking through Documentaries, Short Films and Music Videos. Rahul's first independent directorial was the documentary The Human Boundaries in 2012 and it was widely screened across India, Europe and the United States. His Tamil Music Video titled Mounam Sollum Varthaigal gave his first major break through as it went viral with over 25 million views.

== Filmography ==
†	Denotes films that have not yet been released

=== Feature films ===
Year	Film	Credited As			Notes
Year	Film	Director	Writer	Producer	Notes
2017	Ottamuri Velicham	Yes	Yes	Yes	Kerala State Film Awards 2017 For Best Film
2018	Dakini	Yes	Yes	No	
2019	Kalla Nottam	Yes	Yes	Yes	67th National Film Awards - Best Malayalam Film; Golden Royal Bengal Tiger Award for Best Indian Film
2021	Kho-Kho	Yes	Yes	Yes	Kerala Film Critics Award 2020 - Special Jury Award
2022	Keedam	Yes	Yes	Yes	
2025	Flask	Yes	Yes	Yes	

=== Web series ===
Year	Title	Credited As			Notes
Year	Title	Creator	Writer	Producer	Notes
2023	Kerala Crime Files [Season 1]	No	No	Yes	First Malayalam Originals on Disney+ Hotstar
2024	Jai Mahendran	Yes	Yes	Yes	First Malayalam Originals on Sony LIV
2026	Kappi Squad	No	No	Yes	Long Running Original Series on JioHotstar

=== Animation films ===
Year	Film	Credited As			Notes
Year	Film	Director	Writer	Producer	Notes
2026	Kingara Kavyam (Poem Of The Enslaved) †	Yes	Yes	Yes	Short Film; India Gold, 28th DigiCon6 Asia Awards

=== As actor ===
Year	Film	Role	Notes
2021	Kho-Kho	Vinod	Debut as Actor
2022	Keedam	Vijay	
2023	Tholvi F.C.	CEO	
2024	Jai Mahendran	Balagopal / Balu	Digital Debut As Actor

=== As lyricist ===
Year	Film	Song name	Music director	Singers	Notes
2021	Kho-Kho	Theeram Thane Unarum	Sidhartha Pradeep	Nandagopan V	Debut As Lyricist
2024	Jai Mahendran	But Why	Sidhartha Pradeep	Sidhartha Pradeep	
2025	Flask	Sadamaya Pahimam	Sidhartha Pradeep	Rekha Sreeream, Nithin Raj, Amrita Jayakumar	
2025	Flask	Muthe Njan Pette	Sidhartha Pradeep	Nandagopan V	

=== Music video ===
Year	Film	Language	Notes
2017	Mounam Sollum Varthaigal	Tamil	Screenplay & Direction

=== Short films ===
Year	Film	Notes
2020	Survival Stories	Anthology created during the COVID-19 Lockdown
2016	Troll Life	Platinum Film of the Year - India Film Project 2016
2016	Netaji	Musical Short
2015	Rs. 2	Audience Choice Winner - 48 Hour Film Project, Mumbai
2015	MJ	Best Film #9 - India Film Project 2015
2014	Malai Kofta	

=== Documentary ===
Year	Film	Language	Notes
2012	The Human Boundaries	English-Hindi	Widely screened across India, UK & USA

== Awards ==
National Film Awards

- 2019 - 67th National Film Awards - Best Malayalam Film : Kalla Nottam

Kerala State Film Awards

- 2017 - Kerala State Film Award for Best Film : Ottamuri Velicham

Kerala Film Critics Award

- 2020 - Special Jury Award : Kho Kho

International Awards

- 2026 - India Gold, 28th DigiCon6 Asia Awards: Kingara Kavyam
- 2021 - Golden Royal Bengal Tiger Award for Best Feature Film, 26th Kolkata International Film Festival: Kalla Nottam
- 2021 - Best Screenplay, Yellowstone International Film Festival: Kalla Nottam
- 2020 - Best Film Innovation Award, Indian Film Festival of Cincinnati: Kalla Nottam
- 2018 - German Star of India [Best Feature Film], 15th Indian Film Festival Stuttgart: Ottamuri Velicham
- 2018 - Second Best Feature Film, Chicago South Asian Film Festival: Ottamuri Velicham

Popular Awards

- 2026 - Best Animated Short Film, ANN Awards 2026 (Service Category): Kingara Kavyam
- 2024 - Best Malayalam Web Series (Silver), E4M Play Streaming Media Awards 2025: Jai Mahendran

Nominations

- 2020 - Best Film, Indian Film Festival of Cincinnati: Kalla Nottam
- 2020 - Best Screenplay, Indian Film Festival of Cincinnati: Kalla Nottam
- 2020 - Best Screenplay, New York Indian Film Festival: Kalla Nottam
- 2018 - Best Film, New York Indian Film Festival: Ottamuri Velicham
- 2018 - Best Director, New York Indian Film Festival: Ottamuri Velicham
- 2018 - Director's Vision Award, 15th Indian Film Festival Stuttgart: Ottamuri Velicham
- 2018 - Oxfam Award for Best Film on Gender Equality, Mumbai Film Festival: Ottamuri Velicham
