= Vivek Sachidanand =

Indian sound designer, sound mixer and recordist

- Born: 6 December 1977 (age 48); Thrissur, Kerala
- Occupations: Sound designer, sound mixer
- Years active: 2005-present

Vivek Sachidanand is an Indian sound designer, sound mixer and recordist.

== Early life and education ==
Vivek studied audiography from the Film and Television Institute of India (FTII), Pune (2000–2003). Vivek had a passion for music from early on and he studied classical music and taught himself to play a variety of musical instruments.

== Career ==
He began a serious pursuit of his interests in music and sound when he joined the FTII at Pune. There his ideas on the use of sound as a means of story telling, and not merely as a background prop, took shape. He won the Indian National Film Award for the film Ksha Tra Gya(Best Audiography 2005) where he demonstrated his innovative and occasionally iconoclastic approach to sound design. After leaving FTII he trained with renowned Sound Designers P M Satheesh and Academy Award winner Resul Pookutty and developed his own style of sound mixing and design. From there he went on to found Hashtone Post Sound with an idea of exploring new and uncharted avenues of sound in filmmaking and otherwise. Since then he has been involved in a number of successful Indian and internationally acclaimed projects.

== Filmography ==
Year	Title	Director	Language	Notes
2005	Kal: Yesterday and Tomorrow	Ruchi Narain	Hindi	Sound Designer
2006	Zinda	Sanjay Gupta	Hindi	ADR Recordist
2007	Frozen	Shivajee Chandrabhushan	Hindi	Sound Designer
2007	Gandhi, My Father	Feroz Abbas Khan	Hindi	Assistant Sound Recordist
2008	Slumdog Millionaire	Danny Boyle	Hindi & English	Sound Recordist
2008	Leaving Home: The Life and Music of Indian Ocean	Jaideep Varma	English	Sound Designer & Location Sound Recordist
2008	Hulla	Jaideep Varma	Hindi	Sound Designer
2009	Fast Forward	Zaigam Ali Syed	Hindi	Sound Designer
2009	Acid Factory	Suparn Verma	Hindi	Production Sound Mixer
2009	God Lives in the Himalayas	Sanjay Srinivas	Nepali	Sound Designer & Production Sound Mixer
2010	Change (short film)	Abhijatha Umesh	English	Sound Designer
2010	Jhootha Hi Sahi	Abbas Tyrewala	Hindi	Sound Designer & Production Sound Mixer
2011	Miss Lovely	Ashim Ahluwalia	Hindi	Production Sound Mixer
2011	Yeh Saali Zindagi	Sudhir Mishra	Hindi	Production Sound Mixer
2012	Warning	Gurmeet Singh	Hindi	Production Sound Mixer
2012	English: An Autumn in London	Shyamaprasad	Malayalam	Production Sound Mixer
2012	The Reluctant Fundamentalist	Mira Nair	English	Production Sound Mixer
2013	Qissa	Anup Singh	Hindi	ADR
