= Renganaath Ravee =

Indian sound designer

- രംഗനാഥ് രവി
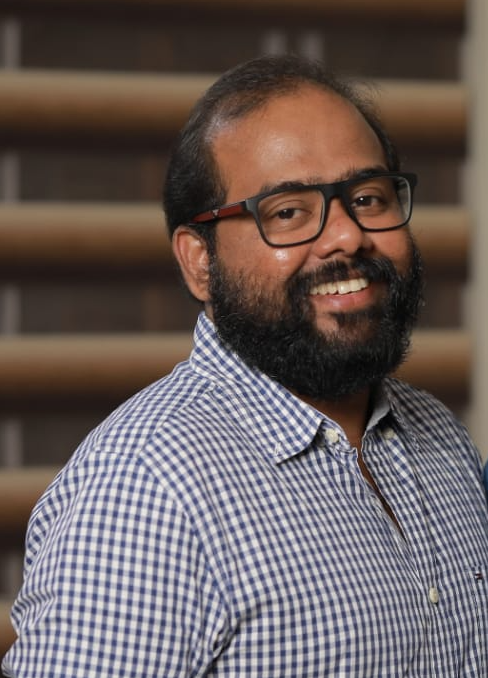
- Born: 1981 or 1982 (age 44–45)
- Occupation: Sound designer
- Years active: 2005–present
- Website: renganaathravee.com

Renganaath Ravee is an Indian sound designer. In 2015, he created a poetry installation which earned him a place in the Limca Book of Records. He started his career as a sound recordist at Tharangini recording studio.

== Biography ==
Ravee grew up as a musician playing violin, guitar, and keyboard.

He is also noted for his unique contributions to the intersection of art and sound. His poetry installation, which creatively combines sound, sculpture, and poetry, is the first of its kind in art history and earned him a place in the Limca Book of Records in 2015.

== Films ==
| Year | Title | Director | Notes |
|---|---|---|---|
| 2026 | Chiram | Sindhu Paradayil; N. Sudheer | |

== Accolades ==
| Year | Awards | Title | Category | Outcome |
|---|---|---|---|---|
| 2015 | Limca Book of Records | Poetry Installation | National Record | Awarded |
| 2020 | Aurangabad International Film Festival | Jallikattu | Best Sound | Won |
| 2021 | 15th Asian Film Awards, Busan | Labyrinth | Best Sound | Nominated |
