= Merin Philip =

Indian actress

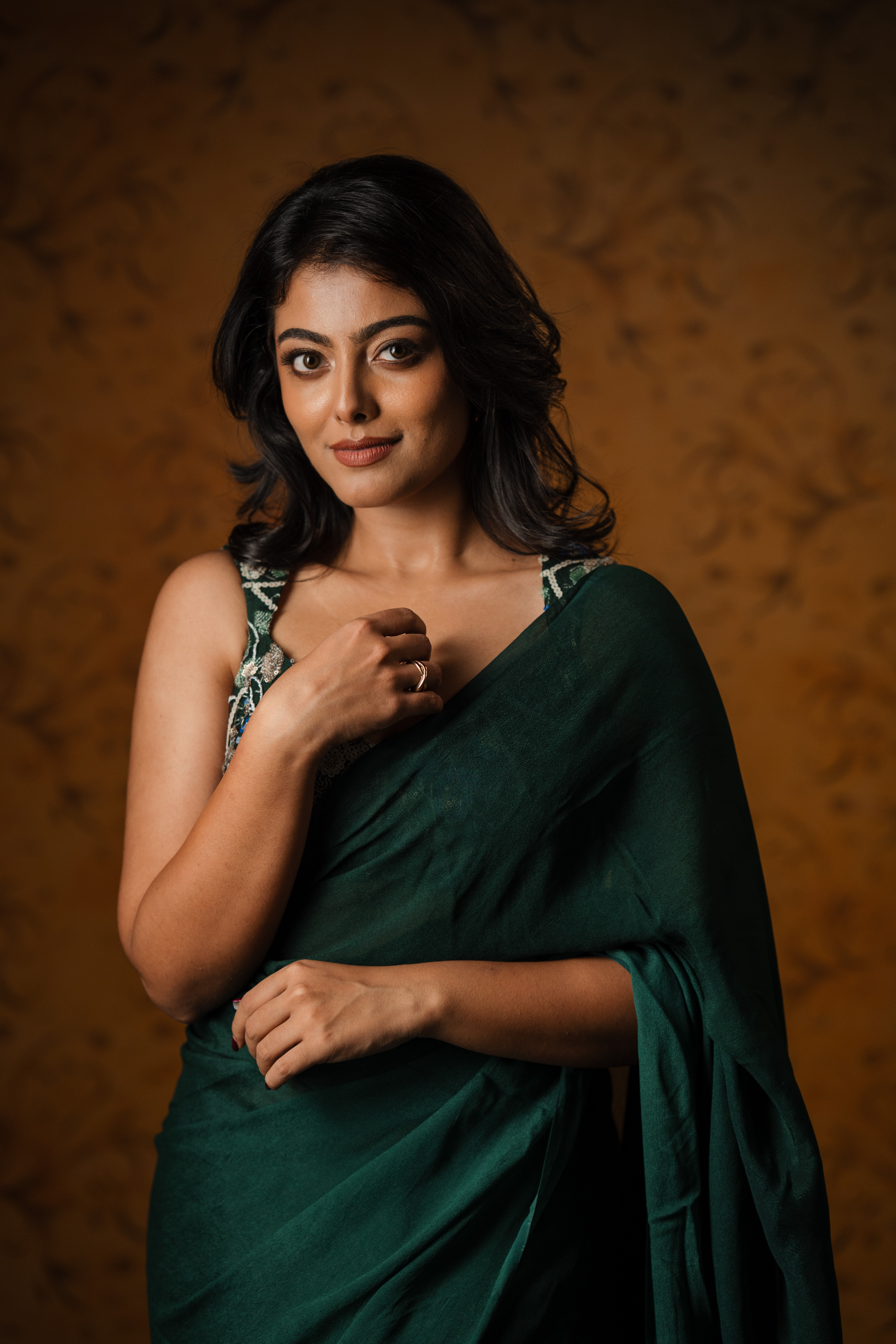
- Born: Merin Mary Philip; Pathanamthitta, Kerala, India
- Occupation: Actress
- Years active: 2018–present
- Parents: Philip C Mathew (father); Daisy Philip (mother)

Merin Mary Philip is an Indian actress who predominantly works in Malayalam films. She is known for her lead roles in Happy Sardar (2019) and Vadakkan (2025). She also played supporting roles in Vaathil (2023), Anchakkallakokkan (2024), and Sookshmadarshini (2024).

== Early life ==
Merin Mary Philip was born on 21 June 1997 in Pathanamthitta, Kerala to Marthomite parents. Her late father, Thumbamon Nechattuparambil Philip C. Mathew, was from Alenchery, Anchal, Kollam. He died on April 27, 2024. Her mother, Daisy Charivupuraiyadhil, is from Kumbazha, Pathanamthitta. He has a brother Melvin and had a late sister Marilyn. She grew up in Abu Dhabi, UAE, where she also first attempted theatre acting at age 14. She continued acting in the theatre until she moved back to Kerala. She has a master's degree in journalism.

== Career ==
Merin moved to Kochi to pursue acting through workshops. She was trained in acting by K. P. Suveeran, Babu Annur, and James Elia. Her first entry into Malayalam cinema was in a supporting role as Irene's friend in Poomaram, starring Kalidas Jayaram and Neeta Pillai, who played Irene in 2018. Poomaram received mixed reviews but received many accolades. In 2019, she played a lead role as Mary Harvinder Singh (née Kochara) in Happy Sardar, opposite to Kalidas Jayaram. The film received negative reviews where critics criticised the pair's lack of chemistry. Deepa Soman of The Times of India described her performance as "cute in her different get-ups" but Sajin Shrijith of The New Indian Express wrote that she was a "bland character". Her next film was in 2023, where she played a supporting role as Kamala in Vaathil. The same year, she played a lead role as Gauthami in Rahel Makan Kora, opposite to Anson Paul.

In 2024, Merin played in three films in supporting roles. She played Daisy in Anchakkallakokkan, a film that received positive reviews but was an average success. She made her Tamil debut as Kani, the beggar's wife, in Bloody Beggar. The film received mixed reviews and was a box-office failure. Bhuvanesh Chandar of The Hindu felt her character was underwritten. In Sookshmadarshini starring Nazriya Nazim, she played as Stephy, Priya's friend and neighbour who is Manuel's girlfriend. The film received positive reviews from critics and was a box-office success. Latha Srinivasan of Hindustan Times felt that she delivers "memorable performances as well and the casting seems very apt."

In 2025, Merin played a lead role as Anna Joseph in Vadakkan. The film received mixed-to-positive reviews. Anjana George of The Times of India wrote that, along with other cast members, she did "what is expected of them, though they are mostly reduced to stereotypical horror movie characters reacting to fear rather than driving the story forward." The film was an official selection at Brussels International Fantastic Film Festival and Salerno Film Festival. She played as Chothi, a supporting role in Nellikkampoyil Night Riders. Vivek Santosh described her performance as "with an eerie stillness" and wrote, "Her scenes carry a chill that the rest of the film never recaptures."

== Filmography ==
Year	Title	Role	Notes
2018	Poomaram	Irene's friend	
2019	Happy Sardar	Mary Kochara	
2023	Vaathil	Kamala	
2023	Rahel Makan Kora	Gauthami	
2024	Anchakkallakokkan	Daisy	
2024	Bloody Beggar	Kani	Tamil film
2024	Sookshmadarshini	Stephy	
2025	Vadakkan	Anna Joseph	
2025	Nellikkampoyil Night Riders	Chothi	
2025	Anumana Pakshi	Kanya Kumari	Telugu film
2026	Bouma	Bathsheba	
