= SIIMA Award for Best Male Debut – Malayalam =

South Indian International Movie Awards

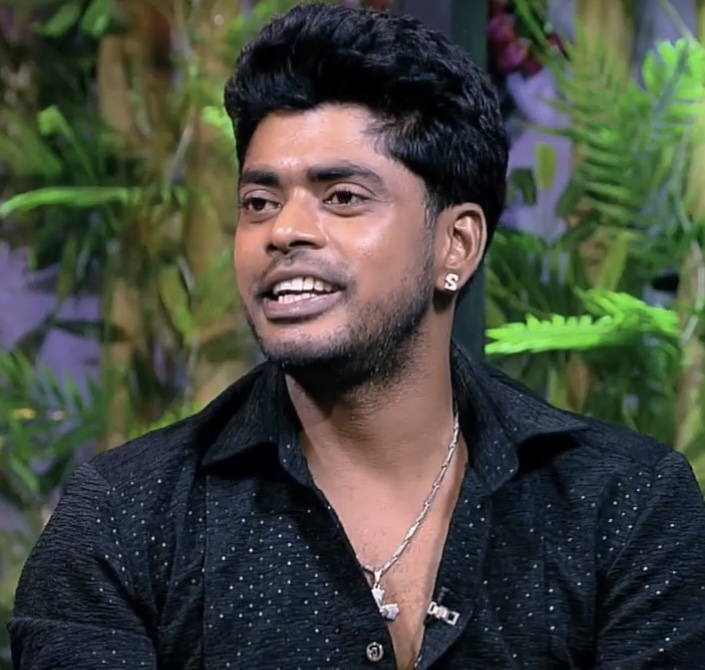
- The 2026 recipient: Sandy
- Awarded for: Best Debut Performance by an Actor in a Leading Role in Malayalam cinema
- Country: India
- Presented by: Vibri Media Group
- First award: 22 June 2012 (for films released in 2011)
- Most recent winner: Sandy, Lokah Chapter 1: Chandra (2025)

The SIIMA Award for Best Male Debut – Malayalam is an award, begun in 2012, presented annually at the South Indian International Movie Awards to a debut actor in lead role via viewers and the winner is announced at the ceremony. The nominations for the category are given by the jury members.

== Winners and nominees ==
Table key
‡	Indicates the winner

=== 2010s ===
Year (Note: Refers to the film's release year)	Actor	Film	Ref.
2011 (1st)	Unni Mukundan ‡	Bombay March 12	
2012 (2nd)	Dulquer Salmaan ‡	Second Show	
2012 (2nd)	Sunny Wayne	Second Show	
2012 (2nd)	Shanker Ramakrishnan	Spirit	
2012 (2nd)	Anu Mohan	Orkut Oru Ormakoot	
2012 (2nd)	Sekhar Menon	Da Thadiya	
2013 (3rd)	Krish J. Sathaar ‡	Ladies and Gentleman	
2013 (3rd)	Niranj Maniyanpilla Raju	Black Butterfly	
2013 (3rd)	Mithun Murali	Black Butterfly	
2013 (3rd)	Dhyan Sreenivasan	Thira	
2013 (3rd)	Sanoop Santhosh	Philips and the Monkey Pen	
2014 (4th)	Farhaan Faasil ‡	Njan Steve Lopez	
2014 (4th)	Santhosh Keezhattoor	Vikramadithyan	
2014 (4th)	John Brittas	Vellivelichathil	
2014 (4th)	Sudev Nair	My Life Partner	
2014 (4th)	Vipin Atley	Homely Meals	
2015 (5th)	Siddharth Menon ‡	Rockstar	
2015 (5th)	Shabareesh Varma	Premam	
2015 (5th)	Sharaf U Dheen	Premam	
2015 (5th)	Adil Ibrahim	Nirnayakam	
2015 (5th)	Vineeth Mohan	Adi Kapyare Kootamani	
2016 (6th)	Shane Nigam ‡	Kismath	
2016 (6th)	Gokul Suresh	Mudhugauv	
2016 (6th)	Arun Kurian	Aanandam	
2016 (6th)	Manikandan R. Achari	Kammatipaadam	
2016 (6th)	Vishnu Unnikrishnan	Kattappanayile Rithwik Roshan	
2017 (7th)	Antony Varghese ‡	Angamaly Diaries	
2017 (7th)	Appani Sarath	Angamaly Diaries	
2017 (7th)	Amal Shah	Parava	
2017 (7th)	Arjun Ashokan	Parava	
2017 (7th)	Askar Ali	Honey Bee 2.5	
2018 (8th)	Pranav Mohanlal ‡	Aadhi	
2018 (8th)	Bibin George	Oru Pazhaya Bomb Kadha	
2018 (8th)	Dhruvan	Queen	
2018 (8th)	Kalidas Jayaram	Poomaram	
2018 (8th)	Senthil Krishna	Chalakkudikkaran Changathi	
2019 (9th)	Sarjano Khalid ‡	June	
2019 (9th)	Akshay Radhakrishnan	Pathinettam Padi	
2019 (9th)	Mathew Thomas	Kumbalangi Nights	
2019 (9th)	Naveen Nazim	Ambili	
2019 (9th)	Sharanjith	Nalpathiyonnu (41)	

=== 2020s ===
Year	Actor	Film	Ref.
2020 (9th)	Dev Mohan ‡	Sufiyum Sujatayum	
2020 (9th)	Anand Roshan	Sameer	
2020 (9th)	Jiji Scaria	The Kung Fu Master	
2020 (9th)	Sanoop Dinesh	The Kung Fu Master	
2021 (10th)	Sanal Aman ‡	Malik	
2021 (10th)	Dineesh P	Nayattu	
2021 (10th)	Joji Mundakayam	Joji	
2021 (10th)	Alex Alister	Joji	
2021 (10th)	Jay J Jakkrit	Marakkar: Lion of the Arabian Sea	
2022 (11th)	Ranjith Sajeev ‡	Mike	
2022 (11th)	Arjun Radhakrishnan	Pada	
2022 (11th)	Kalesh Ramanand	Hridayam	
2022 (11th)	P. P. Kunhikrishnan	Nna Thaan Case Kodu	
2022 (11th)	Swathi Das Prabhu	Thallumaala	
2023 (12th)	Siju Sunny ‡	Romancham	
2023 (12th)	Devadath V. S.	O.Baby	
2023 (12th)	Kalaiyarasan	Thankam	
2023 (12th)	Munish Sharma	Ramachandra Boss & Co	
2023 (12th)	Shersha Sherief	Little Miss Rawther	
2024 (13th)	K. R. Gokul ‡	Aadujeevitham	
2024 (13th)	Abhimanyu Shammy Thilakan	Marco	
2024 (13th)	Hanumankind	Rifle Club	
2024 (13th)	Hipzter	Aavesham	
2024 (13th)	Hridhu Haroon	Mura	
2025 (14th)	Sandy ‡	Lokah Chapter 1: Chandra	
2025 (14th)	Baby Jean	Alappuzha Gymkhana	
2025 (14th)	Karthik	Alappuzha Gymkhana	
2025 (14th)	Al Ameen	Detective Ujjwalan	
2025 (14th)	Orhan Hyder	Sarkeet	
