= Happy Sardar =

2019 film by Sudip Joshy and Geethika Sudeep

- Theatrical release poster
- Directed by: Sudip Joshy; Geethika Sudip
- Written by: Sudip Joshy; Geethika Sudip
- Produced by: Haseeb Haneef; Joshvin Joy; Shwetha Karthik
- Starring: Kalidas Jayaram; Merin Philip; Javed Jaffrey
- Cinematography: Abinandhan Ramanujam
- Edited by: Shameer Muhammed
- Music by: Gopi Sunder
- Production companies: Achicha Films; Desi Flicks
- Distributed by: E4 Entertainment
- Release date: 28 November 2019
- Running time: 153 minutes
- Country: India
- Language: Malayalam

Happy Sardar is a 2019 Indian Malayalam-language romantic comedy-drama film co-written and directed by debutant directorial duo Sudip Joshy and Geethika Sudip. An Indian remake of the French film Serial (Bad) Weddings, it is the first Malayalam film directed by a couple. The film received negative reviews from critics.

== Synopsis ==
Harvinder "Happy" Singh is a happy-go-lucky young man who was born to a Punjabi father, Inderpal Singh and a Malayali mother, Annamma. He falls in love with Mary Kochara, the youngest daughter of Joyce Kochara and Reetha Kochara.

Happy Sardar narrates how Happy and Mary win over each other's parents and get married with their blessings.

== Cast ==
- Kalidas Jayaram as Harvinder "Happy" Singh
- Merin Philip as Mary Kochara / Mary Harvinder Singh
- Javed Jaffrey as Inderpal Singh, Happy's father
- Praveena as Annamma, Happy's mother
- Siddique as Joyce Kochara, Mary's father
- Maala Parvathi as Reetha Kochara, Mary's mother
- Sreenath Bhasi as Sharaff, Happy's friend and Pammi's husband
- Sharaf U Dheen as Kaakku, Mary's family friend
- Balu Varghese as Iqbaal Moos
- Zinil Sainudeen as Jithendra Varma
- Baiju Santhosh as Happy's uncle
- Chippy Devassy as Jeena Kochra / Jeena Jithendra Varma
- Akhila Mohan as Sophie Kochara / Sophie Iqbaal
- Sebastian Sebooty as Adv. Sakhavu Ranadive
- Sithara Vijayan as Annie Kochara / Annie Ranadive
- Siddhi Mahajankatti as Pammi Kaur, Mary's friend, Happy's family friend and Sharaff's wife
- Sibi Thomas as Happy's uncle
- Anoop Chandran as Father Bernard Idikkula
- Vijilesh Karayad
- Sajan Palluruthy
- Dinesh Mohan as Joginder Singh, Pammi's father
- Anjo Nair as Mrs. Joginder, Pammi's mother
- Shaz Mohamed
- Surabhi Santosh as herself (cameo appearance)

== Production ==
=== Casting ===
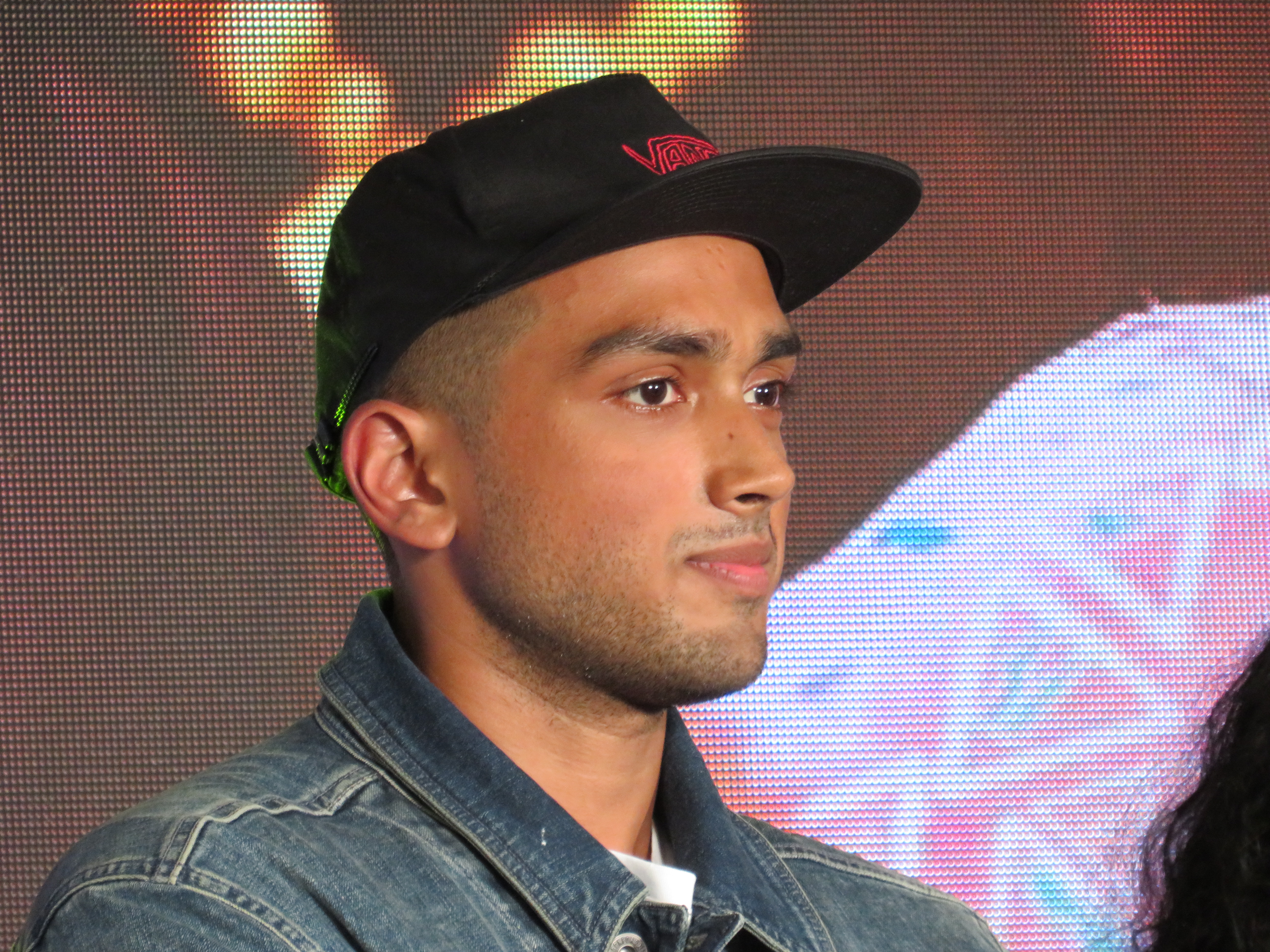
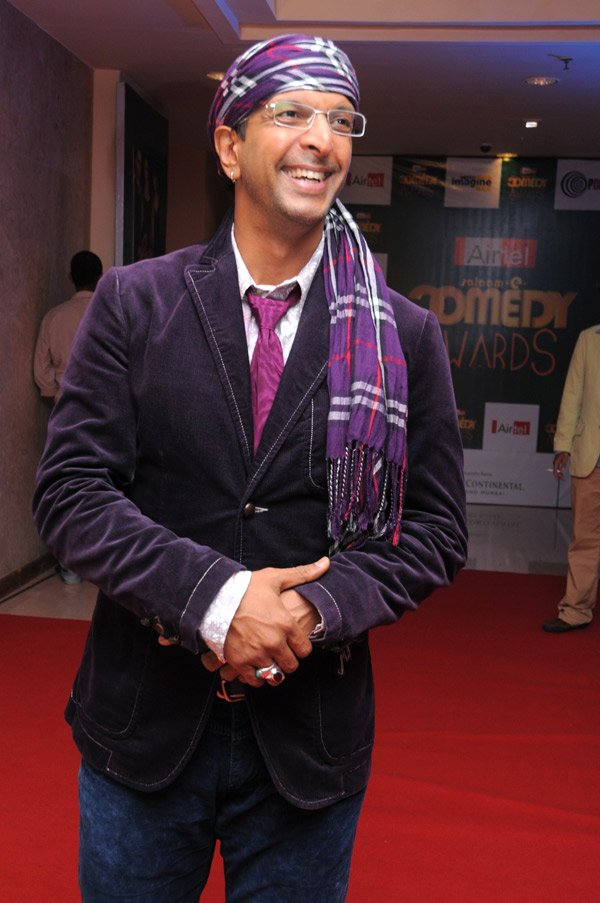
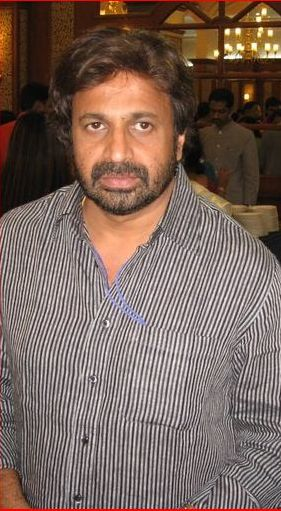
Kalidas Jayaram, Javed Jaffrey and Siddique

In February 2019, it was reported that Kalidas Jayaram will be playing the male lead along with Bollywood actor Javed Jaffrey in an important role. On 16 February, Jaffrey was confirmed to be playing Kalidas's father with Merin Philip as the female lead. Merin was previously seen in Poomaram starring Kalidas in a supporting role. Kalidas joined the sets in Patiala in March 2019. Times of India reported on 19 September that Kalidas, playing a Sikh character will have Aanandam fame Siddhi Mahajankatti as the female lead.

== Reception ==
=== Critical reception ===
Happy Sardar received negative reviews from critics.

Deepa Soman of The Times of India rated the film 2.5/5 stars and described Happy Sardar as "a tale of romance sans chemistry." She wrote, "The film seems to neither care much about establishing why the duo are so into each other, nor does it really bother to captivate the audience. At times, the couple’s journey is even stretched to the point of extreme Bollywood-sque disbelief. ... Happy Sardar might impress those who care the best about a colourful narration, even in the absence of a story with a strong spine."

Sajin Shrijith of The New Indian Express and Cinema Express rated the film 1/5 stars and described it as "a ridiculously staged rom-com". He wrote, "This is a ridiculously plotted and staged romantic comedy that is ultimately neither funny nor romantic. It’s a needlessly prolonged and overstuffed film that overstays its welcome and makes you want to hide in a corner for some time, like Shammi in Kumbalangi Nights, till you begin to feel 'normal' again."
