= Anchakkallakokkan =

2024 film by Ullas Chemban

- Theatrical release poster
- Directed by: Ullas Chemban
- Written by: Ullas Chemban; Vikil Venu
- Produced by: Chemban Vinod Jose
- Starring: Lukman Avaran; Chemban Vinod Jose; Manikandan R. Achari; Sreejith Ravi; Senthil Krishna
- Cinematography: Armo
- Edited by: Rohit V.S. Variyath
- Music by: Manikandan Ayyappa
- Production company: Chembosky Motion Pictures
- Distributed by: Dreamz Entertainment
- Release date: 15 March 2024
- Running time: 125 minutes
- Country: India
- Language: Malayalam
- Box office: est. ₹20 million

Anchakkallakokkan: Porattu (transl. Boogeyman) is a 2024 Indian Malayalam-language crime action drama film directed by Ullas Chemban (in his directorial debut), written by Chemban and Vikil Venu, and produced by Chemban Vinod Jose through Chembosky Motion Pictures. The film stars Lukman Avaran, Chemban Vinod Jose, and Manikandan R. Achari. The narrative follows the investigation of a landlord's homicide and the truths uncovered as events progress.

Development of Anchakkallakokkan began during the COVID-19 lockdown when a friend of Ullas Chemban shared an anecdote about a police officer. Collaborating with Vikil Venu, Ullas commenced scripting in 2022, which took 10 months to complete. Shortly after, pre-production work began. Principal photography took place between January 2023 and March 2023 and was primarily shot in Vandiperiyar and Kumily.

The film was released in theatres on 15 March 2024 to highly positive reviews from critics and audience. In their year-end report, Kerala Film Chamber of Commerce classified Anchakkallakokkan as an "average hit". The film released digitally on Amazon Prime Video on April 19.

== Plot ==
1986: Chaapra, a planter gets murdered on a night he was drinking with Punnari Rajan and Chippan. Vasudevan, a meek and stammering youth arrives at the village the next day to take charge as police constable. He meets Nadavaramban Peter another policeman at the station. Peter is sympathetic towards Vasudevan and helps him settle into his new job. The investigation starts into the murder and police start questioning all villagers who were involved with Chaapra, including Chaapra's maid Padmini. Chaapra's two sons 'Gillappis' are also out to find their father's murderer. They create havoc in the village and terrorize the villagers. Punnari Rajan had done a land deal for Chaapra and was due to give him the money from the transaction. He conspires with Maveli Antu, the local politician, to arrange for someone to surrender to the police for the murder since elections are approaching, and they cannot afford to keep the case open. But before the man he arranges reaches the station, Kollan Shankaran turns up at the station and surrenders as the murderer.

It's revealed that Peter Nadavaramban is having an affair with Padmini, and it was he who planned Chaapra's murder at Padmini's behest. Padmini's husband was Chaapra's assistant, but Chaapra cheated and killed him since he had his eyes on Padmini. He starts harassing Padmini and makes her his concubine eventually. To get her revenge, Padmini plots with Nadavaramban, who uses another criminal Kolliyan to stab Chaapra in the night. Vasudevan however is confused about Sankaran's motive to commit the murder. Sankaran reveals that Peter had killed his daughter in the past when she had an epileptic attack as Peter was trying to molest her. The death gets passed off as unnatural due to her health condition, but Sankaran's neighbor finds out the truth about the circumstances. Sankara gets himself inside the police station since he wants to kill Peter.

Peter now knows that Vasudevan is also aware of his crimes and wants to finish him off as well. He catches Kolliyan from the forests and strikes a deal to use him to kill Sankaran. Meanwhile, The Gillapies discover Maveli and Punari's misappropriation of their father's funds and retaliate by killing them both. They target Punari with a crude bomb during his speech at a congregation, distracting the police on duty at night. Coincidently Sankaran gets out of the cell with the fake key made by his friend when he comes to do work at the police station and attacks Peter and Kolliyan. A fight ensues with the three of them when Gillapis arrives at the scene to finish off Sankaran after they learn of his surrender. They throw a bomb at the station and the elder Gillapi gets killed when the flames detonate the rest of the bombs with him. The younger Gillapi shoots and kills Sankaran, and a shootout ensues between him, Kolliyan, and Peter. Vasudevan, who was subdued by Peter and tied to a window escapes and revives his original aggressive self finally to fight and kill the 3 of them.

In the end, it is revealed that Vasudevan's father was a Porat drama artist and was a downright aggressive and violent man. Vasudevan was raised to be frightened of the demon Kokkan so that he does not get wayward like his father. However, due to his paternal influence, he is also very violent by nature and is gradually raised as a timid person by his mother. His violent childhood character finally comes out during the showdown as he hacks Peter to a bloody death.

== Cast ==
- Lukman Avaran as Vasudevan
  - Master Aloshy as young Vasudevan
- Chemban Vinod Jose as Nadavaramban Peter
- Manikandan R. Achari as Kollan Shankaran / Shankarabharanam
- Megha Thomas as Padmini
- Merin Philip as Daisy
- Sreejith Ravi as Chaapra
- Senthil Krishna as Kolliyan
- Praveen T. J. as younger Gillapi
- Merin Jose Pottackal as elder Gillapi
- R. J. Murugan as SI Sudarshanan Bairi
- Joji John as Urumal
- Pramod Veliyanad as Malaga
- Achuthanandan as Punnari Rajan
- Bitto Davis as Chippan
- Baiju as Maveli Antu
- Nivedith as Karivand Maniyan
- Anu Prabha as Devu
- Ullas Chemban as Siddhan
- Ram Kumar as Rascal Kochuvarkey

== Production ==
=== Development ===
During the COVID-19 lockdown in 2020, Ullas Chemban found inspiration for the film from a casual conversation with a friend who shared a 10-second anecdote about a police officer. Ullas found the anecdote amusing, and encouraged by his brother Chemban Vinod Jose, he began developing it by collaborating with co-writer Vikil Venu. Scripting began in early 2022 and was finished by late 2022, after which pre-production work commenced. Ullas, who was working in Australia while writing the film, resigned from his job and came to Kerala to start production works. Chemban Vinod Jose agreed to produce the film after Ullas narrated the story to senior technicians, which convinced Chemban of its potential. Ullas chose the title Anchakkallakokkan because it referred to the Boogeyman, a folklore figure commonly told by mothers across Kerala to discipline or coerce children to sleep by instilling fear during his childhood. The technical crew of the film included Manikandan Ayyapa, who had worked with Ullas on his short film Pambichi, serving as the film's composer. Rohith served as the editor, while Armo was the cinematographer.

=== Casting ===
Lukman Avaran, who worked on Chembosky Films' earlier production Suleikha Manzil, was approached by Ullas to play Vasudevan, an officer who joins the police as a rookie. Vasudevan is a timid and compassionate person due to his dysfunctional upbringing, and the film portrays his change in behavior from timid to daring due to the circumstances. Ullas initially cast Chemban as Nadavaramban Peter, a character Chemban chose from two options given by Ullas. Ullas wanted Chemban's look to be different from his earlier films. Ullas contacted Manikandan R. Achari via Chemban, and Manikandan agreed to play the role of Kollan Shankaran after he listened to the script. Megha Thomas plays the role of Padmini, the housemaid of Chapara. Chemban recommended her to Ullas, whom she subsequently met. During their interaction, Ullas discussed her character, which required a different makeover and physique to align with the 1980s setting, which she found unique and interesting. Ullas envisioned Praveen T. J. and Merin Jose Pottackal as the Gillapi brothers before scripting commenced. Impressed by his performance in Kammatipadam, Ullas cast Praveen to play the younger Gillapi brother, who is mute. Praveen agreed to play the role after being contacted by a friend of Ullas. Merin Jose Pottackal, who worked with Ullas on Angamally Diaries, was cast to portray the elder Gillapi brother, a youth with a stutter who is also as cruel as his brother. Ullas insisted Merin not cut his hair to match the character's look.

=== Filming ===
During pre-production, location scouting was done from Thiruvananthapuram to Kannur and involved a search for hill stations. The scouting locations included Malayattoor, Athirapally, Kannavam, Bonacaud, and several areas in Idukki, the latter of which was finalized as Chemban felt it resonated with the narrative. Artworks were done minimally, and the majority of the locations were actual places. Scenes at the police station were shot in an old building designed by the art team. Principal photography took place in two schedules between January 2023 and March 2023. The film was primarily shot in Vandiperiyar and Kumily in Idukki, with another two-day shoot taking place in Palakkad.

== Soundtrack ==
Anchakkallakokkan

Soundtrack album by Manikandan Ayyappa
- Released: 2024
- Recorded: 2023
- Genre: Soundtrack
- Length: 42:39
- Language: Malayalam
- Label: Think Music
- Producer: Manikandan Ayyappa
External audio
- Official Audio Jukebox on YouTube

Singles from Anchakkallakokkan
- 1. "Thumbi" Released: 9 March 2024

The soundtrack and background score is composed by Manikandan Ayyappa. The first single titled Thumbi was released on 9 March 2024. The soundtrack was released by Think Music.

No.	Title	Lyrics	Singer(s)	Length
1.	"Thumbi"	Malu, Manikandan Ayyappa	Malu	3:16
2.	"Thenmala"		Nanniyod Kanakan, Raju Palanthoni	4:06
3.	"Mandharam"	Madhavan Kizhakkedath	Krishna Arun	2:35
4.	"Soul of AKK"	Manikandan Ayyappa	Manikandan Ayyappa	3:14
5.	"The Gillappies"	Kumbari, Gabriel Anaman	Kumbari, Gabriel Anaman, Sreerag Ravindran, Sreehari Ravindran, Abhijith Manikandan	3:11
6.	"Kaana Theeyo"	Sadan Thoppil	Manikandan Ayyappa	1:42
7.	"Waves of AKK"	Gabriel Anaman, Madhavan Kizhakkedath	Gabriel Anaman, Manikandan Ayyappa	3:38
8.	"Maane Maruthakam"	Thadathil Appu Ashan, Nandhakumar Kazhimbram	Chandran, Kochubalan	2:44
9.	"Thumbi Trance – Extended"	Malu, Manikandan Ayyappa	Malu	8:37
10.	"Nothing has changed"	Gabriel Anaman	Gabriel Anaman	2:59
11.	"Mannu Thedum"	Madhavan Kizhakkedath	Sreerag Ravindran, Sreehari Ravindran, Abhijith Manikandan, Manikandan Ayyappa, Manikandan Perumpadappu	3:43
12.	"Anchakkallakokkan"	Kumbari	Niranj Suresh, Nanniyod Kanakan	2:54
Total length:				42:39

== Release and reception ==
The film was theatrically released on 15 March and initially limited to Kerala and Karnataka. However, due to its positive reception, it was further expanded to more screens across India. The streaming rights were acquired by Amazon Prime Video and released on 19 April.

=== Box office ===
On its release day, Anchakkallakokkan grossed ₹1.8 million, followed by ₹3.1 million on the subsequent day, and ₹4.4 million on the third day. By the fourth day, it garnered an additional ₹2.4 million, resulting in a cumulative total of ₹11.7 million. In 12 days the film collected a total of ₹2.37 crores domestically and ₹2.23 crores overseas. However, the film's collections began to decline with the release of Aadujeevitham, grossing only ₹200,000 on 31 March. By its fourth week, the film collection ₹5.53 crores worldwide.
