= 21st Asianet Film Awards =

Indian film awards ceremony in 2019

- Awarded for: Best of cinema in 2018
- Date: 6, 7 April 2019
- Location: Kochi
- Country: India
- Presented by: Nyla Usha; Govind Padmasoorya; Prathibha Sai

Television/radio coverage
- Network: Asianet & Asianet Plus

The 21st Asianet Film Awards, honoring the best Malayalam films of 2018, was held on 6 and 7 April 2019 near at FACT Sports Association Ground, Kalamassery, Kochi. The show was hosted by Nyla Usha, Govind Padmasoorya and Prathibha Sai.

== Winners and nominations ==
Table key
‡	Indicates the winner

Category	Winner	Director and Producer/Film
Best Film
Best Film	Sudani From Nigeria ‡	Sameer Thahir and Shyju Khalid
Best Film	Kayamkulam Kochunni	Rosshan Andrrews and Gokulam Gopalan
Best Film	Ee.Ma.Yau.	Lijo Jose Pellissery and Aashiq Abu, Rajesh George Kulangara
Best Film	Odiyan	V. A. Shrikumar Menon and Antony Perumbavoor
Best Director
Best Director	Lijo Jose Pellissery ‡	Ee.Ma.Yau
Best Director	Sathyan Anthikad	Njan Prakashan
Best Director	M. Mohanan	Aravindante Athidhikal
Best Director	Amal Neerad	Varathan
Best Actor
Best Actor	Mohanlal ‡	Kayamkulam Kochunni, Odiyan
Best Actor	Fahadh Faasil	Varathan, Njan Prakashan
Best Actor	Mammootty	Abrahaminte Santhathikal, Uncle
Best Actor	Jayasurya	Captain, Njan Marykutty
Best Actress
Best Actress	Manju Warrier ‡	Aami, Mohanlal, Odiyan
Best Actress	Parvathy	Koode, My Story
Best Actress	Aishwarya Lekshmi	Varathan
Best Actress	Nazriya Nazim	Koode
Most Popular Film
Most Popular Film	Kayamkulam Kochunni ‡	Rosshan Andrrews
Most Popular Film	Njan Prakashan	Sathyan Anthikad
Most Popular Film	Aravindante Athidhikal	M. Mohanan
Most Popular Film	Captain	Prajesh Sen
Most Popular Actor
Most Popular Actor	Prithviraj Sukumaran ‡	Koode, Ranam
Most Popular Actor	Fahadh Faasil	Varathan, Njan Prakashan
Most Popular Actor	Tovino Thomas	Theevandi, Oru Kuprasidha Payyan, Ente Ummante Peru
Most Popular Actor	Nivin Pauly	Hey Jude, Kayamkulam Kochunni
Most Popular Actress
Most Popular Actress	Aishwarya Lekshmi ‡	Varathan
Most Popular Actress	Nazriya Nazim	Koode
Most Popular Actress	Parvathy	Koode, My Story
Most Popular Actress	Anu Sithara	Captain, Oru Kuprasidha Payyan
Best Character Actor
Best Character Actor	Suraj Venjaramoodu ‡	Kuttanpillayude Sivarathri, Theevandi, Njan Marykutty
Best Character Actor	Biju Menon	Padayottam, Aanakkallan
Best Character Actor	Joju George	Joseph
Best Character Actor	Soubin Shahir	Sudani from Nigeria
Best Character Actress
Best Character Actress	Anusree ‡	Aadhi
Best Character Actress	Miya	Parole, Ente Mezhuthiri Athazhangal
Best Character Actress	Nimisha Sajayan	Oru Kuprasidha Payyan
Best Character Actress	Nazriya Nazim	Koode
Best Supporting Actor
Best Supporting Actor	Siddique ‡	Hey Jude
Best Supporting Actor	Soubin Shahir	Sudani From Nigeria
Best Supporting Actor	Renji Panicker	Bhayanakam, Captain
Best Supporting Actor	Dileesh Pothan	Various
Best Supporting Actress
Best Supporting Actress	Savithri Sreedharan & Sarasa Balusserry ‡	Sudani From Nigeria
Best Supporting Actress	Aditi Ravi	Kuttanadan Marpappa
Best Supporting Actress	Shanthi Krishna	Kuttanadan Marpappa
Best Supporting Actress	Sshivada	Chanakya Thanthram
Best Actor in a Negative role
Best Actor in a Negative role	Rahman ‡	Ranam
Best Actor in a Negative role	Sharaf U Dheen	Varathan
Best Actor in a Negative role	Prakash Raj	Odiyan
Best Actor in a Negative role	Chemban Vinod Jose	Maradona
Best Music Director
Best Music Director	M Jayachandran ‡	Odiyan, Koode
Best Music Director	Kailas Menon	Theevandi
Best Music Director	Shaan Rahman	Aravindante Athidhikal
Best Music Director	Gopi Sundar	Kayamkulam Kochunni, Ente Ummante Peru
Best Lyricist
Best Lyricist	B.K. Harinarayanan ‡	Theevandi, Aravindante Athidhikal, Ira
Best Lyricist	Rafeeq Ahammed	Aami, Odiyan
Best Lyricist	Jyothish	Queen
Best Lyricist	Shobin Kannangatu	Kayamkulam Kochunni
Best Playback Singer (Male)
Best Playback Singer (Male)	Vijay Yesudas ‡	Joseph
Best Playback Singer (Male)	K. S. Harisankar	Theevandi
Best Playback Singer (Male)	P. Jayachandran	Captain
Best Playback Singer (Male)	Vineeth Sreenivasan	Aravindante Athidhikal
Best Screenplay
Best Screenplay	Sreenivasan ‡	Njan Prakashan
Best Screenplay	P. F. Mathews	Ee.Ma.Yau.
Best Screenplay	Harikrishnan	Odiyan
Best Screenplay	Bobby–Sanjay	Kayamkulam Kochunni

== Other winners ==
Category	Winner	Film(s)
Best Playback Singer (Female)	Shreya Ghoshal	Odiyan
Best Actor in a Humorous Role	Hareesh Kanaran	Various
Best New Face Actor	Kalidas Jayaram	Poomaram
Best New Face Actress	Neeta Pillai	Poomaram
Best Star Couple	Shane Nigam and Nimisha Sajayan	Eeda
Most Popular Tamil Actress	Trisha	96
Best Editor	Vivek Harshan	Varathan

== Special awards ==
Category	Winner	Work
Lifetime Achievement Award	Sreekumaran Thampi	For his lifetime contribution to Malayalam film industry as a lyricist, director and screenwriter.
Golden Star Award	Jayaram	For his contribution to Malayalam film industry being as a versatile actor.
Honour Special Jury Award	Urvashi	For her contribution to Malayalam film industry in 2018 as an actress in the movies Ente Ummante Peru and Aravindante Athidhikal.
Honour Special Jury Award	Joju George	For his contribution to Malayalam film industry in 2018 as an actor in the movie Joseph.
Evergreen Entertainer	Mukesh	For being a complete actor and a public representative.
Performer of the year	Tovino Thomas	For his enchanting performance throughout his movies in the year 2018.
