= Kannadi Pookal =

- DVD cover
- Directed by: K. Shajahan
- Story by: Bobby–Sanjay
- Based on: Ente Veedu Appuvinteyum (Malayalam)
- Produced by: Howly P. Joy C. Joy N.
- Starring: Parthiban; Kaveri; Sarath Babu; Anand Raj; Nizhalgal Ravi
- Cinematography: Arthur A. Wilson
- Edited by: V. Jaishankar
- Music by: S. A. Rajkumar
- Production company: Teamwork Productions
- Release date: 18 February 2005
- Country: India
- Language: Tamil

Kannadi Pookal (transl. Glass Flowers) is a 2005 Indian Tamil-language film directed by K. Shahjahan. It was released on 18 February 2005. The film was a remake of 2003 Malayalam film Ente Veedu Appuvinteyum. It won the Tamil Nadu State Film Award for Third Best Film.

== Plot ==
Meera marries her neighbor Sakthivel after Sakthivel's wife dies in childbirth, leaving him with their son Vasudevan. Meera decides not to have children and raises Vasu as her own son; the three of them lead a very happy life. However, Meera's widowed father, Big Bird, is unhappy because his lineage will end and his wealth will be depleted unless Meera has a child of her own. When Vasu is nine, Meera accidentally becomes pregnant. This shifts the family's focus to the unborn child, deeply hurting Vasu. He often acts out for attention and is more ignored after the baby is born. Within weeks, Vasu is pushed to the limit and kills the baby with bug spray. Following a complaint by Sakthi, Vasu is arrested and sent to a government-run juvenile detention center. His family is devastated, but they forgive him wholeheartedly.

Vasu gradually regrets his actions, becomes depressed, and his health deteriorates. The family doctor suggests that having another child could help Vasu recover from depression and suggests Vasu help raise the child. This way, Vasu can overcome his guilt. They agree. Vasu gradually adapts to his new role and wishes to return home. Meera becomes pregnant again, but the doctor instructs Sakthi to withhold this information until Vasu's release. Upon release, Vasu meets his former schoolmates at a school event and realizes society will always view him as a murderer. Vasu initially refuses to return home. His family comforts him, and Vasu returns home. He sees his new brother in the crib, is overjoyed, and picks him up. The family reunites happily.

== Cast ==
- Parthiban as Sakthivel
- Kaveri as Meera
- Master Ashwin as Vasudevan
- Rajkapoor as Policeman
- M. N. Nambiar as Court Judge
- Fathima Babu as Meera's aunt
- Pyramid Natrajan as Meera's father
- Sarath Babu as child psychiatrist
- Ponnambalam as jail warden
- Anandaraj as Sakthivel's Friend
- Nizhalgal Ravi as Vasudevan's Lawyer
- Thalaivasal Vijay as Opposite Lawyer of Vasudevan
- Mayilsamy as Jail Child Caretaker
- Paravai Muniyamma as Dancer and Singer in "Dey Vasu Song"

== Soundtrack ==
The music was composed by S. A. Rajkumar.

Track listing
No.	Title	Lyrics	Singer(s)	Length
1.	"Hey Silu Silu"	Pa. Vijay	Sirkazhi G. Sivachidambaram, Nithyasree Mahadevan	3:54
2.	"Konjam Aasai"	Pa. Vijay	Karthik	4:58
3.	"Chinna Chinna"	K. Shahjahan	Srinivas	4:45
4.	"Koothu Pattra"	Kalaikumar	Manikka Vinayagam, S. A. Rajkumar, Srilekha Parthasarathy	4:35
5.	"Dey Vasu"	Pa. Vijay	Parthiban, Deepika, Kanmani, Paravai Muniyamma	4:59
6.	"Chinna Chinna" (Female)	K. Shahjahan	Chinmayi	4:43
Total length:				27:54

== Reception ==
Visual Dasan of Kalki wrote Kurinji flower blossoms once in twelve years, films such as Kannadi Pookkal are also like that and praised director Shahjahan for narrating the plot naturally while also praising the acting of child actor, music and editing. Malini Mannath of Chennai Online wrote, "Despite its flaws and slightly slow pace at times, the film is engaging, thoughtful and worth a watch".
