= Neeta Pillai =

Indian actress

- Born: Thodupuzha, Kerala, India
- Occupations: Actor; model
- Years active: 2018–present

Neeta Pillai is an Indian actress from Kerala who predominantly working in the Malayalam film industry. She debuted with Poomaram in 2018, alongside Kalidas Jayaram.

== Early life ==
Neeta was born at Thodupuzha, Kerala to Vijayan P.N. and Manjula D. Nair. She has done Masters in Petroleum engineering from University of Louisiana at Lafayette, United States. She is a trained classical musician and dancer. She has also won second runner-up title of Miss-Bollywood beauty pageant held at Houston in 2015.

== Career ==
Neeta started her acting in 2018 with Kalidas Jayaram in the film Poomaram, a musical drama film written and directed by Abrid Shine and won Asianet Film Awards for Best New Face of the Year (Female) for her role. She was also nominated for 8th South Indian International Movie Awards (SIIMA) for Best Debut Actress (Malayalam). In 2020, she played the lead role of a martial arts expert in Abrid Shine's The Kung Fu Master. The film was influenced by the action films of Bruce Lee, Jackie Chan and Jet Li and shot at Himalayan Valley, Badrinath and India-China border. She has trained for a year to do action scenes in the film The Kung Fu Master.

== Filmography ==
Key
†	Denotes films that have not yet been released

=== Films ===
All films are in Malayalam language unless otherwise noted.

Year	Title	Role	Notes	Ref.
2018	Poomaram	Irene George	Debut Film	
2020	The Kung Fu Master	Rithu Ram		
2022	Paappan	ASP Vincy Abraham IPS		
2024	Thankamani	Anitha Varkey		
2024	Varshangalkku Shesham	Radhika		

=== Television ===
Year	Program	Role	Channel	Notes
2020	Chill Bowl	Cook	Asianet	
2020	Chankanu Chackochan	Dancer	Asianet	
2020	Comedy Stars Season 2	Celebrity Judge	Asianet	
2020	Star Singer	Dancer	Asianet	

== Awards ==
Year	Award	Category	Film	Result	Ref.
2019	21st Asianet Film Awards	Best New Face of the Year (Female)	Poomaram	Won	
2019	8th South Indian International Movie Awards	Best Debut Actress (Malayalam)	Poomaram	Nominated	
