= Kochu Kochu Santhoshangal =

- Directed by: Sathyan Anthikad
- Screenplay by: Sathyan Anthikad
- Story by: C. V. Balakrishnan
- Produced by: P. V. Gangadharan; Shantha Nair; Suku Nair
- Starring: Jayaram; Lakshmi Gopalaswamy; Kalidas; Innocent; Kavya Madhavan
- Cinematography: Vipin Mohan
- Edited by: K. Rajagopal
- Music by: Ilaiyaraaja
- Production companies: Grihalakshmi Films; Thriveni Movies
- Distributed by: Kalpaka Release
- Release date: 5 May 2000
- Running time: 150 minutes
- Country: India
- Language: Malayalam

Kochu Kochu Santhoshangal (transl. The small moments of happiness) is a 2000 Indian Malayalam-language family drama film written and directed by Sathyan Anthikkad from a story by C. V. Balakrishnan. It stars Jayaram, Lakshmi Gopalaswamy, Kalidas Jayaram, Innocent, and Kavya Madhavan. It marked the on-screen debut of Kalidas. The music was composed by Ilaiyaraaja. The film won two National Film Awards—Best Feature Film in Malayalam and Best Choreography (for Kala).

== Plot ==
Gopan, a single father living with his six-year-old son Achu in Goa, works at a petrol pump, occasionally photographing tourists for extra income. His neighbour Celine, believing him to be a widower, starts liking him, which prompts Gopan to reveal that Achu's mother, Asha Lakshmi, is alive. He shares the details of their separation.

Gopan and Asha had eloped together due to family disapproval towards their relationship, given their different stations in life. Following marriage, Asha temporarily set aside her aspirations to be a classical dancer, instead becoming a housewife to support Gopan. After Achu's birth, Maya Varma, a famous classical dance artist, learned of Asha's talent, and asked her to join her dance troupe.

Asha's renewed career comes into conflict with her family life. Tensions between Gopan and Asha's father exacerbated the situation. Eventually, Gopan left with his son, believing that their departure would benefit Asha's career.

In the present day, Gopan runs into Maya in Goa, but she pretends to not recognize him. Later, Celine presents Maya to Gopan, who reveals that Asha has not danced since Gopan left with their son. Gopan and Asha reunite, with Maya advising them that there needs to be a balance between art and family life.

== Cast ==
- Jayaram as Gopan
- Kalidas Jayaram as Ashok Gopan a.k.a. Achu
- Lakshmi Gopalaswamy as Asha Lakshmi (voiced by Bhagyalakshmi)
- Innocent as Jose
- Kavya Madhavan as Celine (voiced by Sreeja Ravi)
- Bhanupriya as Maya Varma
- Lalu Alex as Ashok
- Siddique as Ramesh
- Lena as Deepa
- Kalabhavan Mani as Sudhakaran
- Urmila Unni as Vilasini
- K. P. A. C. Lalitha as Jagadhamma
- Oduvil Unnikrishnan as Shekaran
- Vettukili Prakash, Sukumaran
- Mala Aravindan as Sankaran
- Augustine as Mathews
- Thesni Khan as herself
- Valsala Menon as Asha's grandmother
- Yamuna as Elizabeth
- Babu Swamy as Andrews

== Production ==
Jayaram signed into play the male lead along with his son Kalidas Jayaram marking his debut as an actor. It was K. P. A. C. Lalitha who suggested the name of Kalidas for the film. For the female lead role, Meenakshi Sheshadri was considered but Lakshmi Gopalaswamy was eventually signed. Actress Hema Malini had signed to play another important role, but was replaced by actress Bhanupriya. Samyuktha Varma signed into play the role of Celine but opted out due to prior commitments. Later, Sukanya was considered for the role, and finally, Kavya Madhavan essayed the character. The film was shot in Panaji, Goa.

== Soundtrack ==
Kochu Kochu Santhoshangal

Soundtrack album by Ilayaraja
- Released: 14 April 2000
- Recorded: 1999–2000
- Genre: Film
- Language: Malayalam

Ilayaraja chronology
Karisakattu Poove (2000)	Kochu Kochu Santhoshangal (2000)	Bharathi (2000)

All lyrics are written by Kaithapram Damodaran; all music is composed by Ilaiyaraaja.

No.	Title	Artist(s)	Length
1.	"Chellakkaatte"	K. J. Yesudas
2.	"Ghanashyaama"	Gayatri Asokan
3.	"Kodamanjin Thaazhvarayil" (Duet)	K. J. Yesudas, K. S. Chithra
4.	"Kodamanjin Thaazhvarayil" (Female)	K. S. Chithra
5.	"Kodamanjin Thaazhvarayil" (Male)	K. J. Yesudas
6.	"Palappoomazha"	Bhavatharini
7.	"Shivakaradhamarukalayamaay Naadam"	K. S. Chithra, Gayathri Asokan
8.	"Sumasaayaka"	Kallara Gopan, Geetha Devi
9.	"Title song"	Deepika, Chorus

== Accolades ==
Award	Category	Recipient(s)	Result	Ref.
National Film Awards	Best Feature Film in Malayalam	Kochu Kochu Santhoshangal	Won	
National Film Awards	Best Choreography	Kala	Won	
Asianet Film Awards	Best Child Artist	Kalidas Jayaram	Won	
