= Thankamani (film) =

2024 Malayalam-language film

- Poster
- Directed by: Ratheesh Reghunandan
- Written by: Ratheesh Reghunandan
- Produced by: R. B. Choudary; Raaffi Mathirra
- Starring: Dileep; Neeta Pillai; Manoj K Jayan; Pranitha Subhash
- Cinematography: Manoj Pillai
- Edited by: Shyam Sasidharan
- Music by: William Francis
- Production companies: Super Good Films; Iffaar Media
- Distributed by: Dream Big Films Phars Films (Overseas) Yash Raj Films (UK/Europe)
- Release date: 7 March 2024
- Country: India
- Language: Malayalam

Thankamani (also known as Thankamani: The Bleeding Village) is a 2024 Indian Malayalam-language survival crime thriller film written and directed by Ratheesh Reghunandan and produced by R. B. Choudary under Super Good Films and Raaffi Mathirra under Iffaar Media. The film stars Dileep, with Manoj K. Jayan, Neetha Pillai, Pranitha Subhash, Malavika Menon, Ajmal Ameer, Siddique, Sudev Nair, Azees Nedumangad, John Vijay, Sampath Ram and Major Ravi in supporting roles. The film is based on a real-life incident that occurred in Thankamany in October 1986.

The film was officially announced in January 2023 under the tentative title D 148, being the 148th film of Dileep. The official title, Thankamani, was announced in September 2023. Principal photography began in January 2023 in Kottayam and wrapped up in August 2023. The filming took place in Erattupetta, Kanjirappally, Koottickal, Poonjar, Kuttikkanam, Peermade, and Kattappana. The musical score was composed by William Francis, while the cinematography and editing were handled by Manoj Pillai and Shyam Sasidharan. The film was theatrically released on 7 March 2024. This movie was a box-office bomb.

== Premise ==
The movie opens with the cold-blooded murder of a politician by an unknown assailant. As the investigation unfolds, Arpitha Nath IPS, the lead investigator, discovers similarities between this murder and the killing of a police officer a year earlier. Delving deeper, she connects these crimes to the Thankamani incident and begins unravelling the events of 1986 in the village. This leads her to Abel Joshua Maathan, a Thankamani resident who, like many others, suffered from police brutality. Arpitha learns that Abel is responsible for the murders. But his hitlist includes more people, all involved in the 1986 incident. The rest of the film follows Arpitha's pursuit of Abel and his attempts to fulfil his mission.

== Cast ==
- Dileep as Abel Joshua Maathan alias Thankamani
- Neeta Pillai as Anitha Varkey, Abel's wife
- Pranitha Subhash as ACP Arpitha Nath IPS, Investigative Officer
- Manoj K. Jayan as Mani Peter, the main antagonist
- Siddique as George Peruvanthanam, News reporter
- Sudev Nair as Roy, Abel's friend and Rahael's love interest
- Malavika Menon as Rahael Joshua Maathan, Abel's sister
- Sivakami Anantha Narayan as Sister Lisy Varkey, Anitha's elder sister and Abel's sister in law
- Azees Nedumangad as Thankachan, Abel's friend
- Ajmal Ameer as ACP Robin Paul IPS
- Santhosh Keezhattoor as CI Nithin Panicker
- John Vijay as Retd.SP Michael Kuruvila, former DYSP of Kattappana, Mani Peter's Partner
- Sampath Ram as Retd.CI Eppan Mattakkavan, Mani Peter's Partner
- Kottayam Ramesh as Politician Sakahvu Varadharajan, Mani Peter's Partner
- Major Ravi as DGP Urmees Tharakan IPS
- Rajesh Sharma as Maniyan Pillai
- Remya Panicker as ASI Roshni
- Ambika Mohan as Chakkarayammachi, Abel's mother
- Jordi Poonjar as Thankamani SI
- James Elias as Retd. SI Ayyappan Panicker
- Sminu Sijo as Lilly, Anitha's mother and Abel's mother in law
- Nisthar Sait as Varkey, Anitha's father and Abel's father in law
- Anjana Mohan as Jwala
- Durga Krishna as Mercy Mani Peter, Mani Peter's daughter (cameo appearance)
- Spadikam Sunny (P. N. Sunny) as Podippara Vakkan, Mani Peter's right hand
- Sreeya Ramesh as Human Rights Commission official
- Geethi Sangeetha as Sauda
- Thomman Mankuva as SI Aloshy
- Jibin Gopinath as Achankunju
- Arun Sankaran Pavumba as Avira Aanthappan
- Dasettan Kozhikode
- Arun Punalur
- Sujith Pookkalam as Doctor
- Dinu Sathyan as Simon
- Ratheesh Reghunanthan as News Reader (cameo appearance)

== Production ==
=== Development ===
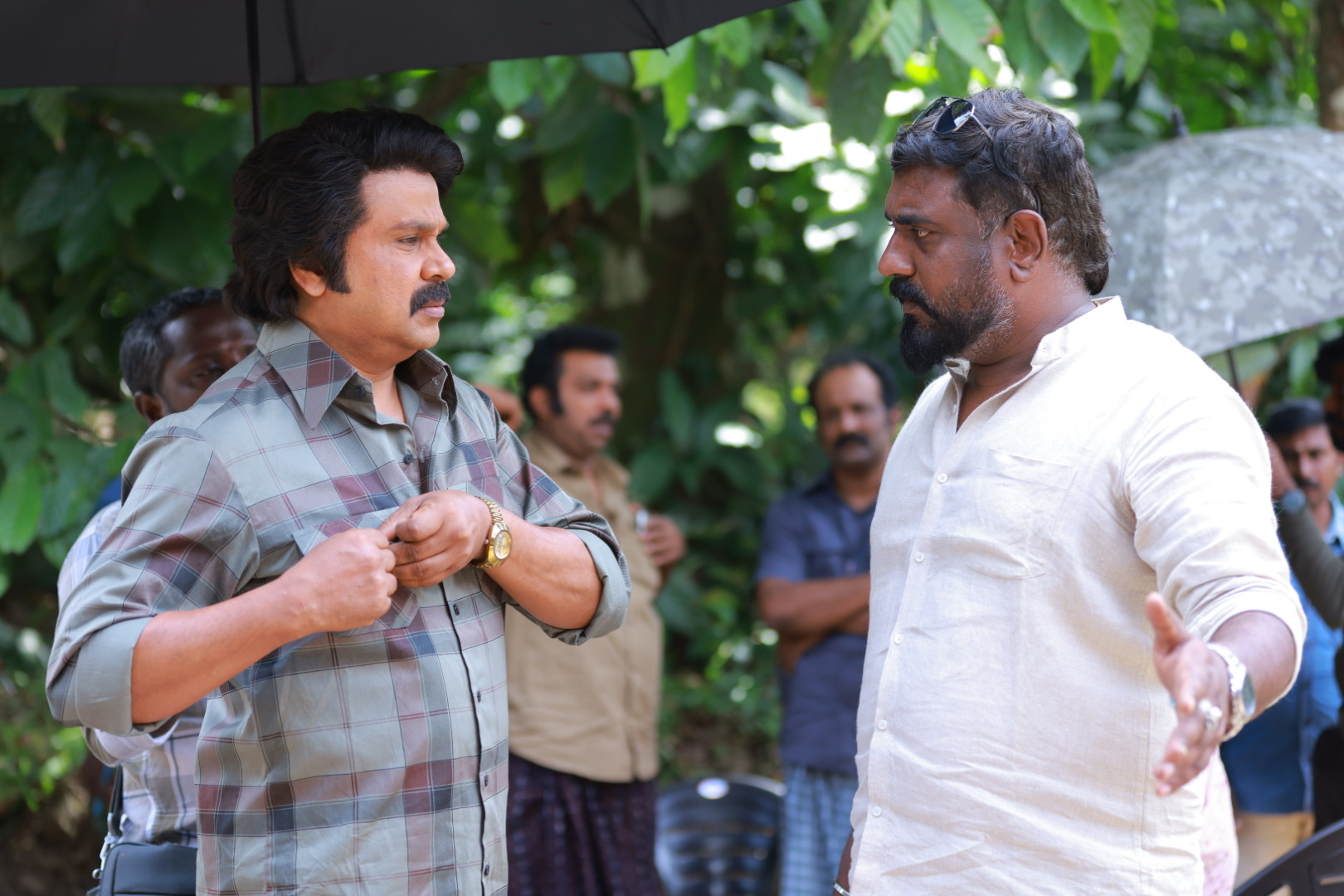
Director Ratheesh Raghunandan and Dileep from the sets of Thankamani

Thankamani marks the first collaboration of Ratheesh Reghunandan, who previously directed Udal (2022), with Dileep. It is produced by R. B. Choudary under the banner Super Good Films, in association with Iffaar Media of Raaffi Mathirra. It will be the 97th production of Super Good Films and the 18th production of Iffaar Media. The film was tentatively titled D 148, as it is the 148th film of Dileep. The film was officially announced on 27 January 2023 in Kochi with a pooja ceremony held at the Crowne Plaza hotel. Joshiy inaugurated the function by lighting the Nilavilakku, while Jiiva performed the switch-on, and producer Raaffi Mathirra gave the first clap. The official title Thankamani was announced on 4 September 2023. In order to shoot the action sequences, the makers have hired action directors like Siva, Supreme Sundar, Rajashekhar and Mafia Sasi.

=== Casting ===
After her previous appearance in Paappan (2022), Neeta Pillai signed to play the female lead. Pranitha Subhash, who is making her debut in Malayalam cinema, was cast to play another female lead.

=== Filming ===
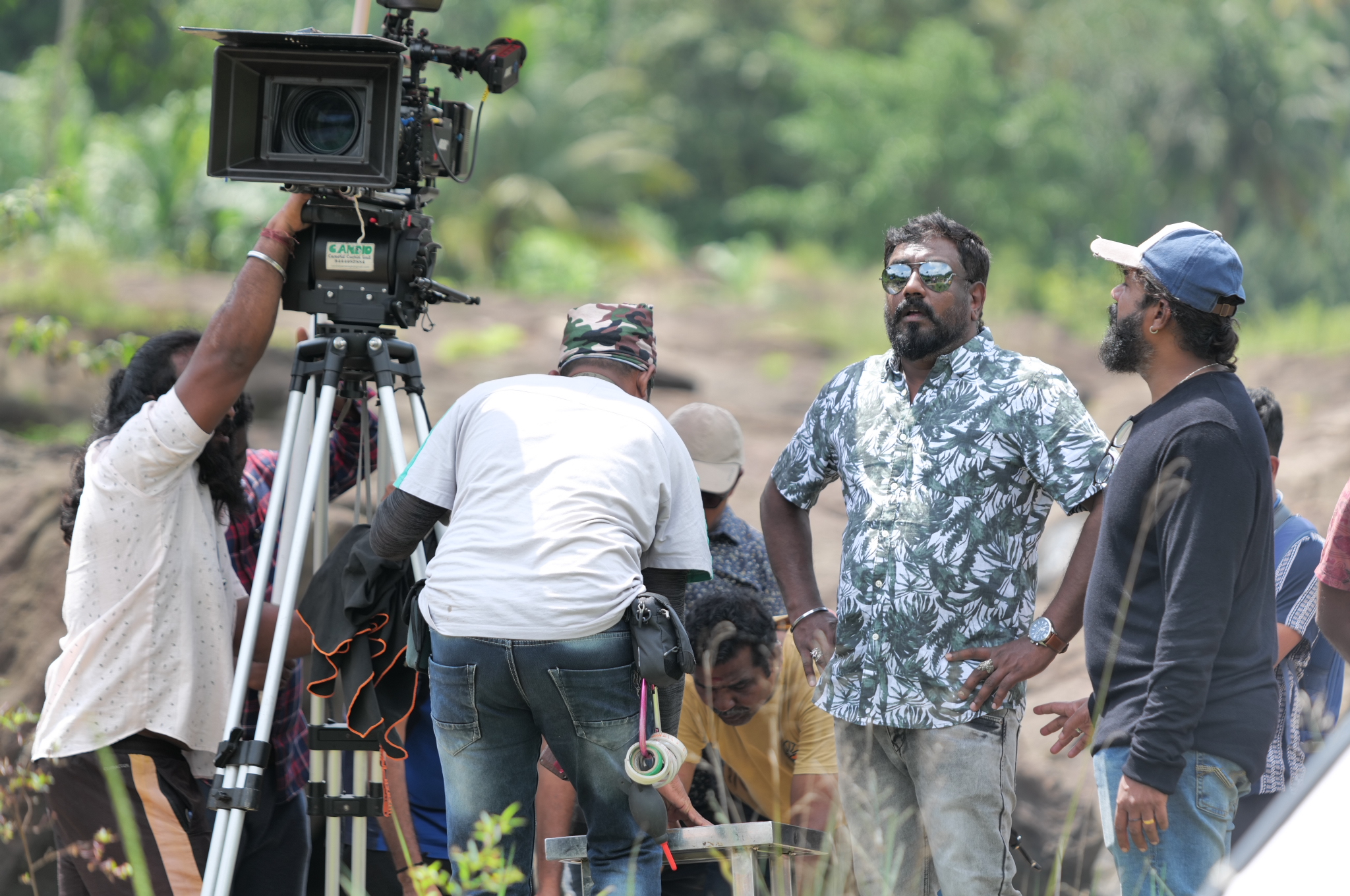
Ratheesh Raghunandan in Thankamani film shooting location

Principal photography commenced with the first schedule on 28 January 2023 at CMS College Kottayam, and reportedly, around 500 junior artists were involved. Dileep joined the shoot in the first week of February. Erattupetta, Kanjirappally, Koottickal, Poonjar, Kuttikkanam and Peermade were other prominent filming locations. The first schedule was completed on 8 March 2023 after a 40-day shoot. The crew began the second schedule on 8 May 2023 in Kattappana and nearby locations. With the help of art director Manu Jagath, a set was constructed on 2.5 acres (1.0 ha) of land near Kattappana to shoot some important scenes, involving a thousand junior artists for 15 days. The shooting wrapped up on 17 August 2023 in Kattappana.

== Reception ==
The Indian Express rated 1 out of 5 stars and wrote: "Dileep's performance in the film is particularly dismal, even worse than his previous work in Bandra." The Times of India rated 2.5 out of 5 stars and wrote "Ratheesh Reghunandan's film based on real-life incident fails to impress". Hindustan Times wrote "Dileep's film is a major let-down, dilutes real-life tragedy with needless romance". Onmanorama wrote "Dileep walks a tightrope between daring, melodrama" Times Now rated 3 out of 5 and wrote "a decent premise let down by poor screenplay".

== Box office ==
The film underperformed at the box office. The film grossed ₹3.4 crores, ₹27 lakhs and ₹90 lakhs at the Kerala, the rest of India and the overseas box office respectively, in its final run.
