= Nellikkampoyil Night Riders =

2025 Indian Malayalam-language horror film

- Theatrical release poster
- Directed by: Noufal Abdullah
- Written by: Sunu A. V. Jyothish M.
- Produced by: Abbas Thirunavaya; Sajin Ali; Dipen Patel
- Starring: Mathew Thomas; Roshan Shanavas; Meenakshi Unnikrishnan
- Cinematography: Abhilash Shankar
- Edited by: Noufal Abdullah
- Music by: Neha Nair; Yakzan Gary Pereira
- Production companies: A&HS Productions
- Release date: 24 October 2025
- Running time: 122 minutes
- Country: India
- Language: Malayalam
- Budget: ₹8 crore
- Box office: ₹5.2 crore

Nellikkampoyil Night Riders (marketed as Night Riders) is a 2025 Indian Malayalam-language horror comedy film, edited and helmed by Noufal Abdullah, in his directorial debut. The film stars Mathew Thomas, Meenakshi Unnikrishnan and Roshan Shanavas in the lead role. The film is produced by Abbas Thirunavaya, Sajin Ali and Dipen Patel for A&HS Productions. The film received mixed reviews from critics and audiences.

== Plot ==
Nellikampoil Night Riders is set in the quiet, rural village of Nellikampoil, a place surrounded by dense forests and steep hills where traditional beliefs and folklore still influence daily life. The villagers live simple, routine-bound lives, but beneath the calm surface lies a strong fear of the supernatural. Stories about spirits wandering the roads at night have existed in the village for generations, passed down by elders as warnings to the younger generation.

The story follows a group of village youngsters led by Shyam, who returns home from Mangalore after spending time away. He reconnects with his close friends, and together they spend their days wandering through the village, meeting their girlfriends, and enjoying the carefree nature of rural life. They are modern in their thinking and often laugh at the old ghost stories told by the elders, considering them nothing more than superstition meant to control people’s behavior.

Their disbelief is shaken when strange incidents begin to occur in the village. Several residents report seeing a mysterious figure on the roads late at night — a tall, shadowy being that appears to walk like a human but has horse-like feet. The creature is said to move unusually fast and disappear into the darkness before anyone can approach it. At first, the youngsters assume it is a prank or a misunderstanding, but fear begins to spread as sightings increase and rumors circulate from house to house. The tension grows when livestock goes missing and one villager is found injured after claiming to have encountered the figure. The elders interpret these events as proof that a spirit has returned to haunt the village. They begin performing rituals and warning the youth to stay indoors after sunset. The mysterious figure soon earns the name “night rider,” and its presence becomes the main topic of discussion in the village.

Curiosity and a desire to prove their bravery push Shyam and his friends to investigate the mystery themselves. Armed with mobile phones and torches, they begin roaming the roads at night, hoping to capture evidence of the creature and expose it as a hoax. During one of these nights, they catch a glimpse of the figure from a distance. Its unnatural movements and eerie sounds terrify them, planting the first seeds of doubt in their rational beliefs. As fear spreads, an elderly villager shares an old legend connected to the land. He tells them about Chothi, a woman who lived in the village many years ago and died under tragic and suspicious circumstances after being betrayed by someone she trusted. According to local folklore, her spirit never found peace and continues to wander the region. The elder suggests that the night rider might be linked to her restless soul, which deepens the mystery and adds an emotional layer to the story.

Determined to uncover the truth, Shyam and his friends plan a final attempt to confront the creature. One night, they follow the figure deep into the forest, where the atmosphere becomes tense and frightening. Strange sounds echo through the trees, and the boys begin to panic as they realize they may be dealing with something beyond their understanding. During the chase, one of them gets separated from the group, heightening the suspense and fear. As events unfold, the truth behind the mysterious sightings slowly comes to light. The terrifying image of the night rider, which had spread through the village as a supernatural being, is revealed to be rooted in human actions, misunderstandings, and the power of fear and rumor. However, the film keeps an element of ambiguity, suggesting that not everything can be explained logically and leaving room for the possibility that something supernatural may still exist.

In the climax, the youngsters expose the reality behind the creature in front of the villagers. The revelation shocks the community and forces them to confront how easily fear and superstition had taken control of their lives. Some villagers accept the explanation and begin to move on, while others continue to believe that unseen forces were at work and that the spirit of Chothi still lingers.

By the end of the story, life in Nellikampoil slowly returns to normal, but the events leave a lasting psychological impact on both the elders and the youth. The youngsters, who once mocked village legends, gain a new respect for the power of belief and the influence of the past. The film closes with a lingering sense of uncertainty, hinting that in a place where folklore and reality coexist so closely, the truth is never completely clear and some stories may never truly die..

== Cast ==
- Mathew Thomas as Shyam
  - Adhinath as Young Shyam
- Roshan Shanavas as Kannan
- Sarath Sabha as Rajesh
- Meenakshi Unnikrishnan as Dhanya
- Merin Philip as Chothi
- Vishnu Agasthya as SI Pushparaj
- Premalatha as Shyam's mother
- Chaithra Praveen as Vidya
- Rony David as Kuttappan
- Abu Salim as Ex Soldier Vasappan
- Noushad Ali as Raveeshan
- Zinil Zainudheen as Shaijan
- Naseer Sankranthi as Kunjunni
- Renji Kankol as Vineesh
- Vayyapuri as Harianna
- Thambayi as Nani Muthashee
- Gilu Joseph as Chandrika
- Ramshi as Binu
- Unni as Jayesh
- Vijaya as Kuttappan's wife
- Thankam as Moli Chechi
- Ani as Rajesh's mother
- Roy Thomas as Venu

== Production ==
=== Casting ===
Editor Noufal Abdullah launched himself as a film director with Nellikkampoyil Night Riders, signing Mathew Thomas in the lead role. The film bankrolled by Abbas Thirunavaya, Sajin Ali and Dipen Patel is written by Sunu A.V and Jyothish M, who wrote Pranaya Vilasam.

=== Filming ===
Principal photography of the film was wrapped up on 11 March 2025 at Palakkad.

=== Marketing ===
The first look poster of the film was released on 11 June 2025.

== Music ==
Nellikkampoyil Night Riders

Soundtrack album by Yakzan Gary Pereira, Neha S Nair
- Released: September, 2025
- Genre: Feature film soundtrack
- Length: 15m 17s
- Label: T-Series

=== Tracklisting ===
Nellikkampoyil Night Riders Official Soundtrack
No.	Title	Lyrics	Singer(s)	Length
1.	"Fight The Night"	GABRI	GABRI	2:36
2.	"Kaadhal Ponmaan"	Vinayak Sasikumar	Neha S. Nair, Vishnu Vijay	3:07
3.	"Bhootha Ganam"	Vedan	Vedan	3:04
4.	"Kulire"	Vinayak Sasikumar	Meenakshi Unnikrishnan, Alan Joy Mathew	1:59
5.	"TASMAC"	Dope Daddy	Neha S. Nair, Ajay Krishna	3:31
6.	"Choti (ekanilavo)"	King Orekh	Minmini	3:36
Total length:				15:17

== Release ==
=== Theatrical ===
Nellikkampoyil Night Riders was initially scheduled to release theatrically on 10 October 2025, but got postponed to 24 October due to the theatrical runs of Kantara: Chapter 1.

=== Home Media ===
The post theatrical digital streaming rights of the film is acquired by ZEE5 and started streaming from 6 February 2026.

== Reception ==
=== Box office ===
On its first day, Nellikkampoyil Night Riders earned approximately ₹60 lakhs net in India. On the second day, it earned ₹67 lakhs, bringing the total to ₹1.27 crores.

=== Critical reception ===
Anna Mathews of The Times of India rated the film 3/5 stars. The first half of the film is highly praised for its scary atmosphere, with all technical departments combining brilliantly to deliver genuinely unsettling scares. The performances, including those of Mathew Thomas and Sarath Sabha, and the romance are noted as unique. The second of the film is characterised by "sluggish writing" and an "uninspired" revelation of the "ghost's" identity. She wrote, "Because this is a horror film, not about making the spirit go away, but about conquering one’s fears."

S. R. Praveen of The Hindu wrote, "When the horror is laughable and the humour horrific, it is clear that the film didn’t work the way it was intended to. Nellikkampoyil Night Riders does not leave one with anything memorable."

Vivek Santhosh of The New Indian Express rated the film 2/5 stars and wrote, "Taken as a whole, Nellikkampoyil Night Riders is tidy and intermittently lively, yet it stays predictable. The craft keeps it afloat, but the writing never gives it a reason to linger. With a stronger antagonist and a bolder approach to its own ideas, it might have risen above the basics. As it stands, it plays like a routine rural mystery that fades from memory soon after."

Anandu Suresh of The Indian Express rated the film 1.5/5 stars and wrote, "What adds to the Noufal Abdullah directorial's woes is Mathew Thomas's unimpressive performance, particularly his amateurish, timid handling of comedy."

C. J. Sudhi of Malayala Manorama wrote, "The two-hour-long film keeps the audience engaged throughout and stands out as a perfect family entertainer. Abhilash Shankar’s captivating cinematography and Noufal Abdullah’s sharp editing add more brilliance to the movie."

Vishnupriya S. of Zee News wrote, "The horror-comedy thriller Nellikkampoyil Night Riders, directed by debutant Noufal Abdullah and starring Mathew Thomas in the lead role, opened to highly positive responses. Blending fantasy elements, the film is set in the fictional Kerala–Tamil Nadu border village of Nellikkampoyil. Set in the 1970s, it narrates a gentle tale of love and friendship in a border village, beginning with the voice-over of Shyam (Mathew Thomas), a young man studying in Bangalore."

Asianet News wrote, "In this film where visual effects play a major role, that department has performed remarkably well. The music is composed by Yaxson Gary Pereira and Neha Nair, while the screenplay is penned by Jyothish M. and Sunu A. V. Films belonging to the horror-comedy genre have always intrigued audiences, and Nellikkampoyil Night Riders does not disappoint in meeting those expectations."

Vishal Menon of The Hollywood Reporter wrote, "It’s a thin plotline that could only have been saved in execution. Director Noufal Abdullah tries his best to create the illusion of a mysterious village, but there’s only so much he can do."
