= Thankamany =

- Town
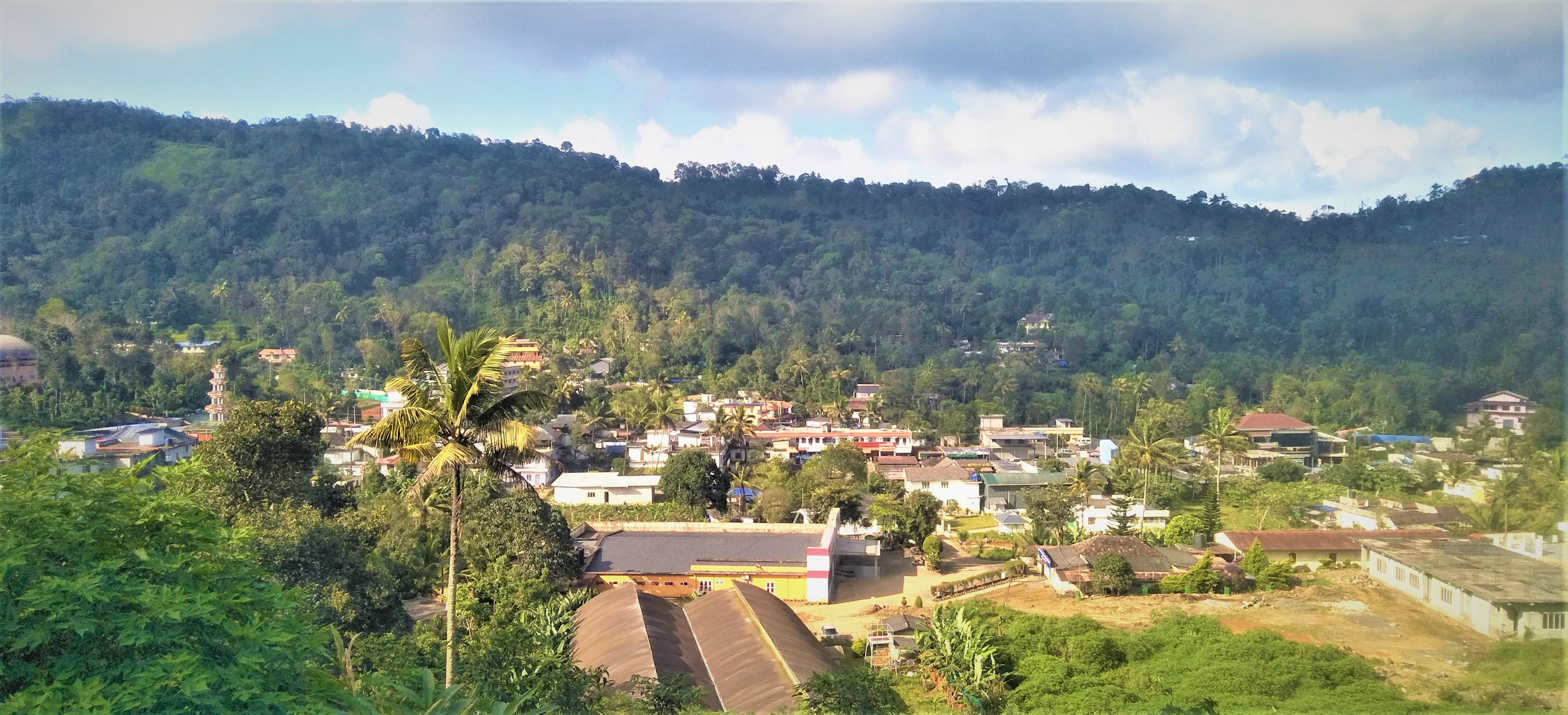
- Downtown Thankamony from the south

- Location in Kerala, India Thankamany (India)
- Coordinates: 9°50′25″N 77°2′07″E
- Country: India
- State: Kerala
- District: Idukki
- Taluk: Idukki

Area
  - Total: 44.62 km^{2} (17.23 sq mi)

Population (2011)
  - Total: 24,389
  - Density: 546.6/km^{2} (1,416/sq mi)

Languages
  - Official: Malayalam, English
- Time zone: UTC+5:30 (IST)
- PIN: 685609
- Vehicle registration: KL 6
- Nearest city: Kattappana, Nedumkandam
- Sex ratio: 1001(female to male in 1000) ♂/♀
- Literacy: 97.85%
- Climate: tropical (Köppen)

Thankamany is a town at Idukki district, in Kerala state, India. In regional language thankamany is a name of a lady. It is a belief that a king Thopran gave dowry as land for his three daughters Thankamany, Kamashi, and Neeli. The place got for Thankamony is now known as Thankamany (place name), other nearby places are also known as Kamashi and Neelivayal (means land of Neeli). Thankamany town is located in a valley of three small hills Thamprankunnu, Kattadikavala and Kurishupara respectively. One of the interesting thing is that, even though Kamashi is a different place, the panchayath of thankamany is called Kamashy panchayath and the office is situated in the middle of thankamany town.Sometimes in official documents thankamany is also written as thankamony. Nearest towns are Kattappana and Nedumkandam.

== Demographics ==
As of 2011 Census, Thankamony had a population of 24,389 with 12,189 males and 12,200 females. Thankamony village has an area of 44.62 km^{2} (17.23 sq mi) with 5,907 families residing in it. In Thankamony, 10.5% of the population was under 6 years of age. Thankamony had an average literacy of 97.85% higher than the state average of 94%: male literacy was 97.7% and female literacy was 96%.

== People ==
The people of Thankamany speak the Malayalam language. Most of the people are involved in agriculture and are generally interested in the plantation of spices. Being a hilly area, the climate is suitable for pepper, cardamom, tea and coffee cultivation.

Most of the vegetables are exported from here to Ernakulam/Kochi (the nearest big town). This small village gives major production of vegetables. Thankamany is situated in Kamakshy Panchayath and in Thankamany Village.

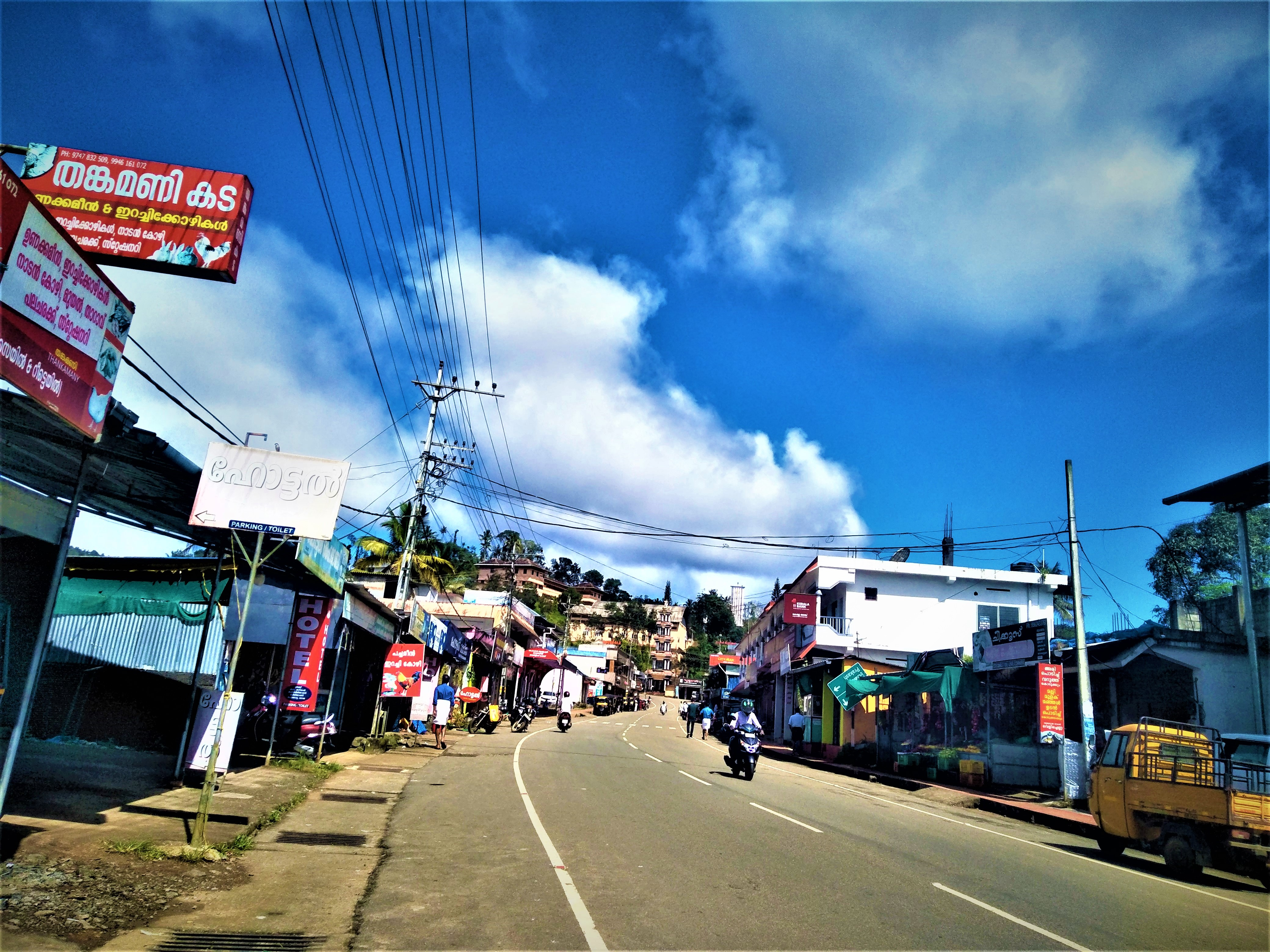
State Highway 43 in Thankamany

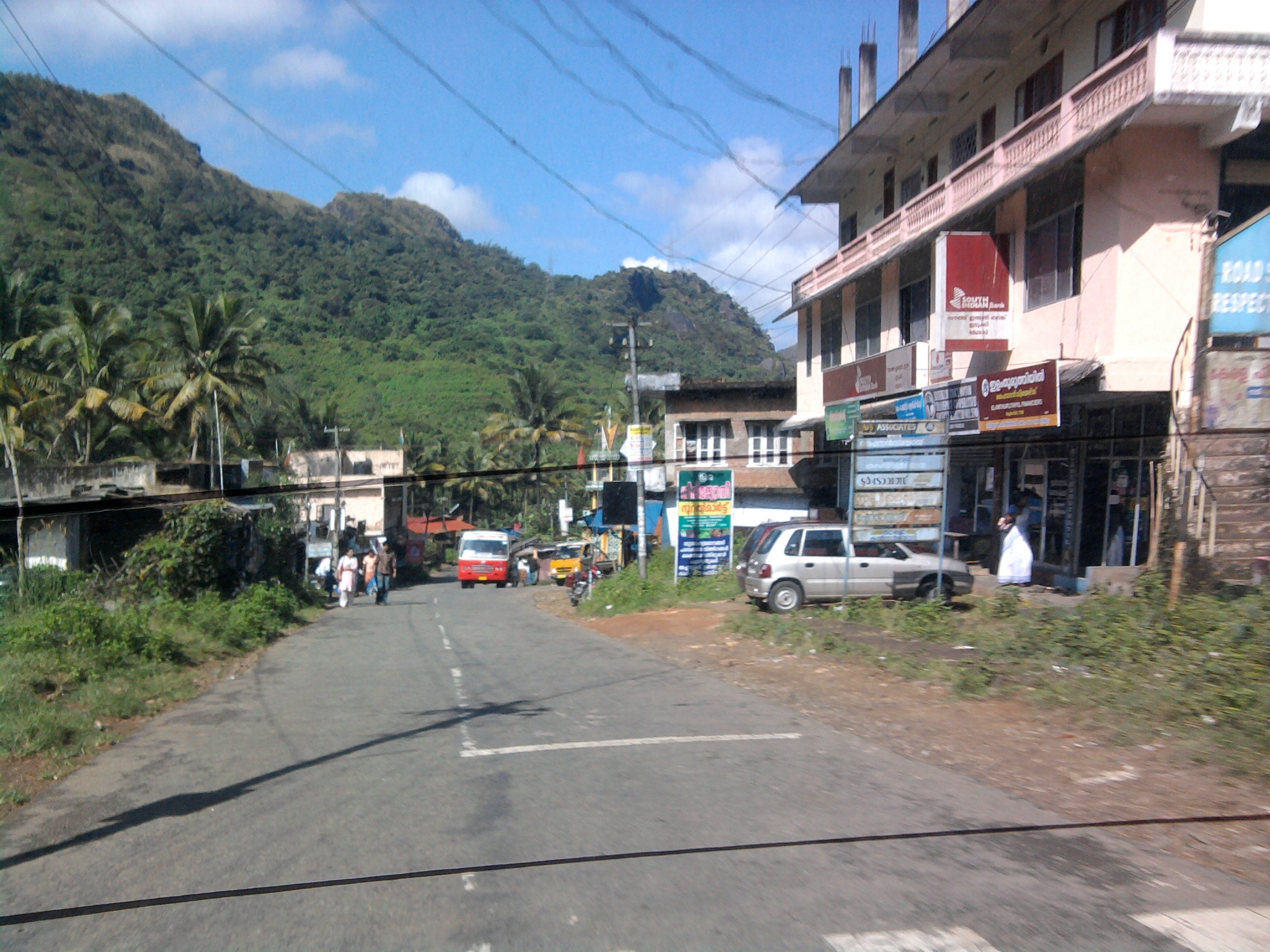
National Highway 185 in Thankamany

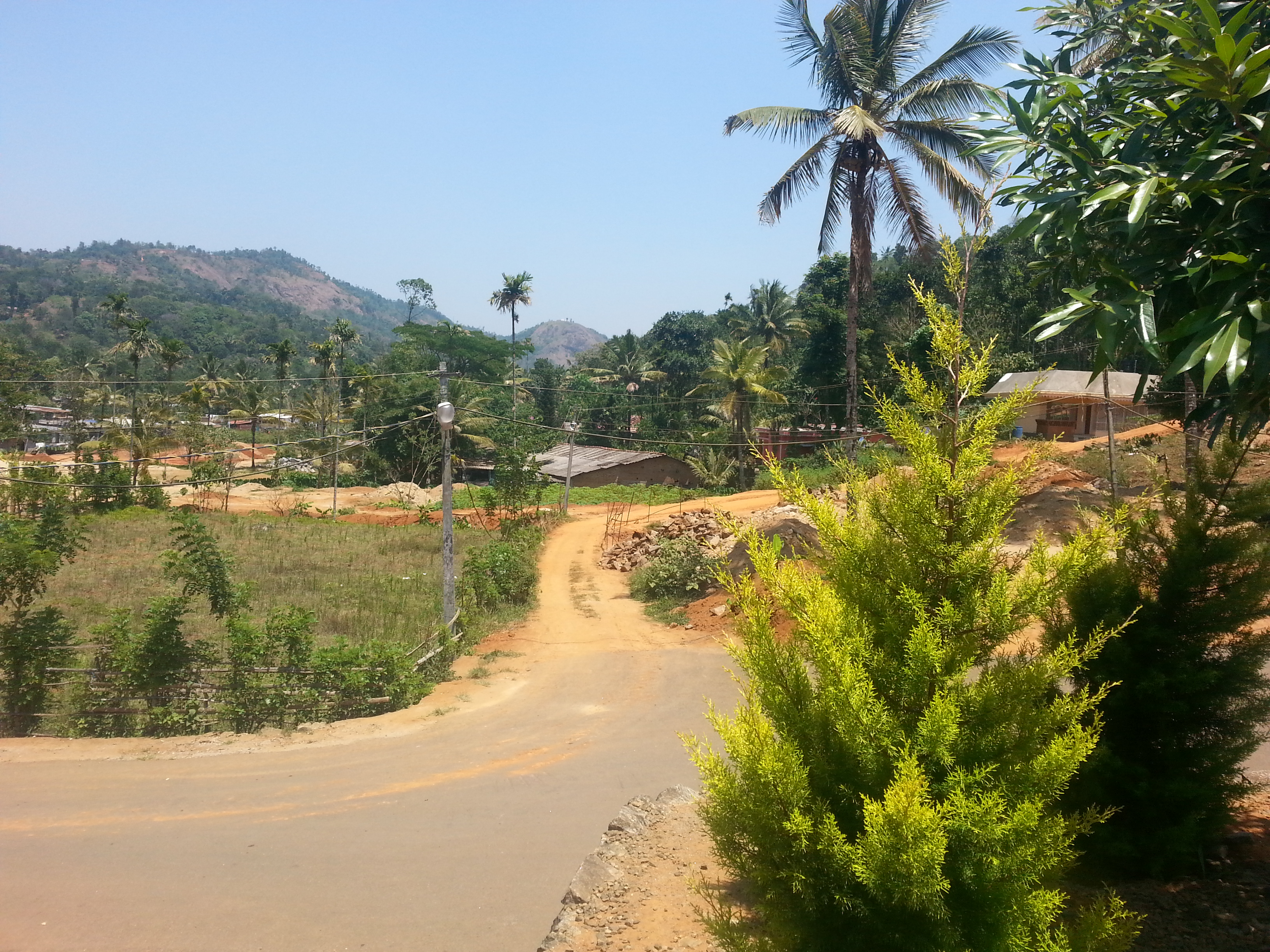
Thankamany hamlet

== Religion ==
Almost 90% of people are Syro Malabar Syrian Catholic(formerly known as Roman Catholic Syrian Catholic (R.C.S.C)), most of them are migrated from Pala (in Kottayam district) before two generation or less than that. Rest of the people are Hindus including Ezhavas, Vishvakarma and Nair. People are in good communal harmony.

== Institutions ==
Being a Christian majority area, the St. Thomas Forane church situated at the heart of Thankamany town. It runs the St. Thomas H.S.S, which is the only school having a higher secondary status in and around of Thankamany. Many small educational institutions like Vimala Neursery school are also situated here. In addition to that in the heart of Thankamany town a Nair temple is situated. Thankamany Co-Operative hospital is the main hospital here. A police station is also present here. Thankamany village office is also situated at the heart of Thankamany which is near to police station. Thankamany service Co-operative bank, UBI and Kerala Bank(IDCB) also present in Thankamany.

== In popular culture ==
The 2024 Malayalam movie Thankamani is based on the real life incident of police brutality happened in this place on 1986
