= Vaathil =

- Directed by: Ramakanth Sarju
- Written by: Shamnad Shabeer
- Produced by: Suji K Govindaraj
- Starring: Vinay Forrt; Anu Sithara; Krishna Sankar
- Cinematography: Manesh Madhavan
- Edited by: Johnkutty
- Music by: Sejo John
- Production company: Spark Pictures
- Release date: 22 September 2023
- Running time: 129 minutes
- Country: India
- Language: Malayalam

Vaathil (transl. Door) is a 2023 Indian Malayalam-language drama thriller film directed by Ramakanth Sarju and produced by Suji K. Govindaraj. The film stars Vinay Forrt and Anu Sithara in lead roles.

The film was released on 22 September 2023.

== Cast ==
- Vinay Forrt as Dennis
- Krishna Sankar as Kappeesh
- Anu Sithara as Annie
- Merin Philip as Kamala
- Abin Bino
- Anand Manmadhan
- Sunil Sukhada as Joseph
- Sminu Sijo
- Anjali Nair as Surumi
- Sruthy Jayan
- Sruthy Suresh
- Vk Byju
- Unni Raja

== Music ==
The songs and background score are composed by Sejo John.

== Reception ==
=== Critical reception ===
Anjana George of The Times of India gave the film 2/5 stars and wrote that "Despite a promising premise about choices and doors that open, "Vaathil" chooses the door that countless other films have walked through before. It lacks the freshness and innovation required to make it stand out. In the end, it's a missed opportunity to explore the road less traveled and make a meaningful impact".
