= Ente Veedu Appuvinteyum =

2003 Indian Malayalam family drama film

Ente Veedu Appoontem
- Directed by: Sibi Malayil
- Written by: Bobby–Sanjay
- Produced by: Prem Prakash
- Starring: Kalidas Jayaram; Jayaram; Jyothirmayi
- Cinematography: Venugopal Madathil
- Edited by: L.Bhoominathan
- Music by: Ouseppachan
- Distributed by: Murali films
- Release date: 11 April 2003
- Running time: 143 minutes
- Country: India
- Language: Malayalam

Ente Veedu Appuvinteyum (transl. My home also for Appu) is a 2003 Indian Malayalam-language family drama film directed by Sibi Malayil and produced by Prem Prakash. It was the debut movie as scriptwriters of brothers Bobby and Sanjay. The film starred Kalidas Jayaram, Jayaram, and Jyothirmayi in lead roles along with Kalashala Babu, Nedumudi Venu, Siddique, Salim Kumar, Vishnu Unnikrishnan, Shammi Thilakan, Sanusha, and K. P. A. C. Lalitha in supporting roles. It was remade in Tamil as Kannadi Pookal in 2005. Kalidas won the National Film Award for Best Child Artist for his performance in the film.

== Plot ==
The movie revolves around Viswanathan, his wife, Meera, and his son, Vasudev, who are a happy family. Although Meera is Vasu's stepmother, they are very close to each other. Meera loves Vasu as her own son, and Vasu considers Meera as not only his mother but also his best friend.

Meera gives birth to a son and Vasu is the happiest. He names his little brother Appu and cares much for him. After Appu is born, his parents start paying more attention to the baby while Vasu feels left out. On Appu's birthday, Vasu buys him a small gift with the pennies he had saved. But when he sees everyone giving expensive and much costlier gifts, he feels disappointed and hides his gift. He feels insecure when he sees his parents caring for Appu more while not being attentive towards him. Feeling dejected, one day Vasu and his father fall into an argument and Vishwanathan goes to the extent of slapping Vasudev. This begins to create problems leading Vasu to unintentionally kill the baby, which in turn gets him imprisoned in the juvenile home. After completing the terms in the juvenile home, he comes back to the home and gets a surprise from Meera in the form of another baby as his step-brother. He also names that baby Appu and gives him the old gift he bought for the deceased baby. Viswanathan and Meera are happy about their bonding.

== Cast ==
- Kalidas Jayaram as Vasudev Vishwanathan
- Jayaram as Viswanathan
- Jyothirmayi as Meera Vishwanathan (voiceover by Praveena)
- Kalashala Babu as Jayakumar, Meera's father
- K. P. A. C. Lalitha as Meera's Aunty
- Shammi Thilakan as Chandran
- Nedumudi Venu as Doctor Krishnakumar, a child psychologist
- Siddique as C.I. Santhosh, Vishwanathan's friend
- Salim Kumar as Ganeshan, Chef in Juvenile Prison
- Arun Sathyan as Rajappan (Prisoner Boy)
- Vishnu Unnikrishnan as Prisoner Boy
- Geetha Salam as Bhaskaran
- Subair as Sethumadhavan, Public Prosecutor
- Ambika Rao as Teacher
- Jose Prakash as Judge

== Reception ==
=== Box office ===
The film was a commercial success.

== Accolades ==
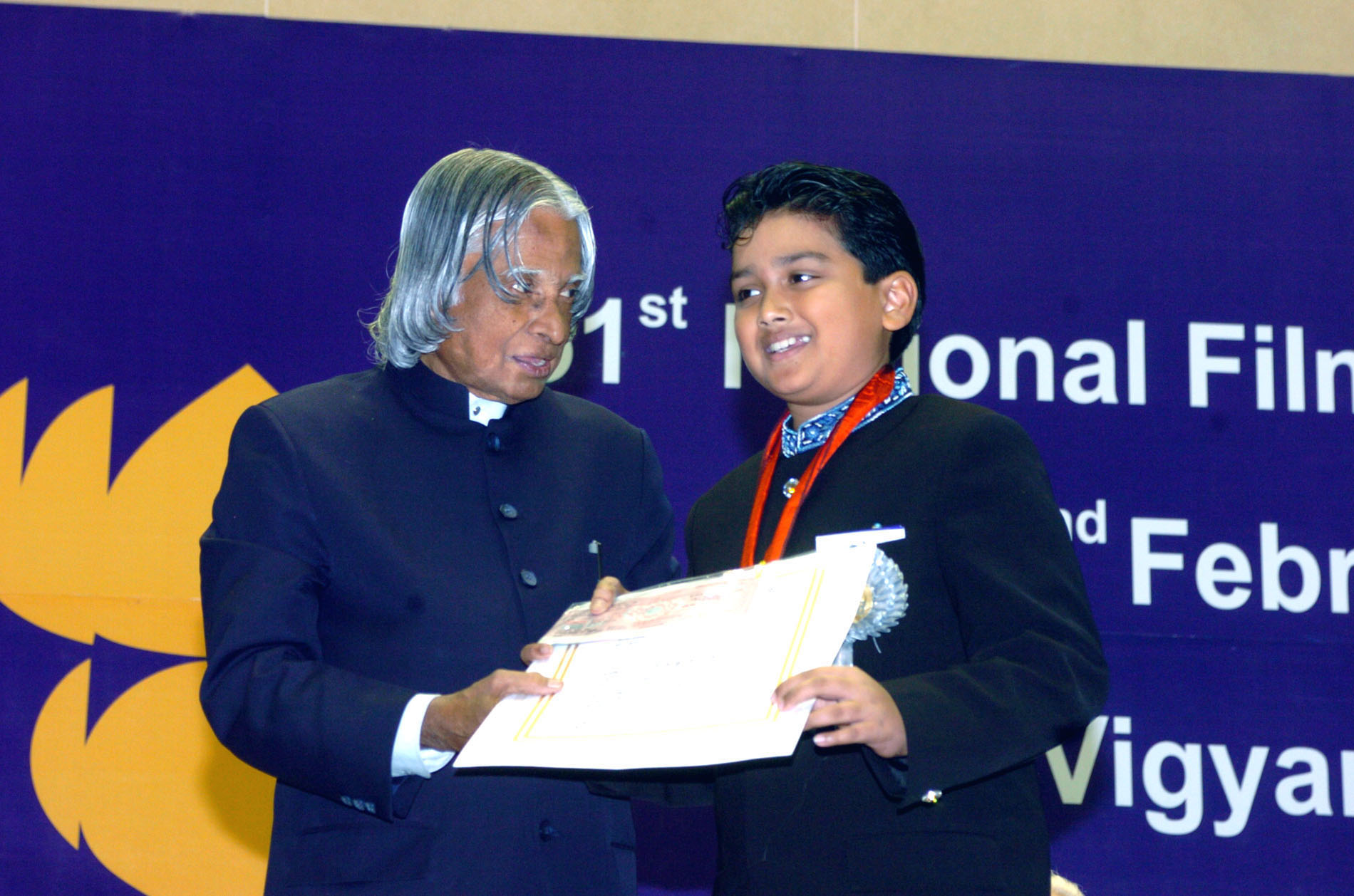
Kalidas receiving the Best Child Artist award from President A. P. J. Abdul Kalam

National Film Awards 2003

- Best Child Artiste – Kalidas Jayaram

Kerala State Film Awards 2003

- Kerala State Film Award for Best Film with Popular Appeal and Aesthetic Value - Prem Prakash ( film producer )
- Kerala State Film Award for Best Director - Sibi Malayil

Asianet Film Awards

- Asianet Film Award for Best Film - Prem Prakash ( film producer )

== See also ==
- List of Malayalam films of 2003
