= The Kung Fu Master =

2020 Malayalam film

- Directed by: Abrid Shine
- Written by: Abrid Shine
- Produced by: Shibu Thekkumpuram
- Starring: Neeta Pillai; Jiji Scaria; Sanoop Dinesh; Sooraj S Kurup; Anju Balachandran; Sonet Jose
- Cinematography: Arjun Ravi
- Edited by: K. R. Midhun
- Music by: Ishaan Chhabra
- Production company: Full On Studios
- Release date: 24 January 2020
- Running time: 126 minutes
- Country: India
- Language: Malayalam

The Kung Fu Master is a 2020 Indian Malayalam-language martial arts film directed by Abrid Shine and produced by Shibu Thekkumpuram under Fullon Studio Frames. The film stars Neeta Pillai, Sanoop Dinesh and Jiji Scaria in the lead roles. The music was composed by Ishaan Chhabra. Arjun Ravi, the son of actor-director Major Ravi, made his debut as a cinematographer with this film.

== Plot ==
Rishi Ram and his sister Rithu Ram are trained in martial arts and live in Uttarkhand with their family. Rishi is a family man and a martial arts instructor, while Rithu is a college lecturer. In an unexpected circumstance, Rishi becomes a police informer against Louis Antony, a leader of a criminal gang trained in martial arts. However, Louis learns about Rishi's identity and arranges an attack on him and his family. Rishi and Rithu's family are killed, leaving them devastated. An enraged Rishi and Rithu sets out to avenge their family's death. Rishi and Rithu form a plan and manage to eliminate Louis's gang. Rishi and Rithu finally fight with Louis, where they manage to kill Louis and return to their peaceful life.

== Cast ==
- Neeta Pillai as Rithu Ram
- Jiji Scaria as Rishi Ram
- Sanoop Dinesh as Louis Antony
- Sooraj S. Kurup as Naveen
- Anju Balachandran as Anu
- Sonet Jose as Killer Jenson

== Production ==
The film was shot at Himalayan Valley, Badrinath and India-China border. The martial arts sequences were influenced by the action films of Bruce Lee, Jackie Chan and Jet Li. Neeta Pillai trained Kung fu for a year to perform action scenes in the film.

== Soundtrack ==
The music and background score was composed by Ishaan Chhabra, and the lyrics for the songs were written by Sreerekha Bhaskaran.

== Release ==
The film was released on 24 January 2020.

=== Home media ===
The satellite and digital rights were sold to Asianet and Amazon Prime Video.

== Reception ==
=== Critical response ===
Sajin Shrijith of Cinema Express gave 3.5/5 stars and wrote "A solid martial arts film that makes you want to sign up for self-defence classes." Cris of The News Minute gave 3/5 stars and wrote "Baring the few read-from-a-textbook-like dialogue deliveries at the beginning, the film is engaging, paced, but perhaps lacks effort in its scripting."

G. Ragesh of Onmanorama gave 2.5/5 stars and wrote "Except for the boldness to experiment in choice of themes, The Kung Fu Master is neither above nor below a notch in Abrid's career graph." Anna Mathews of The Times of India gave 2.5/5 stars and praised its action choreography and acting, but criticised its story and characterization.

S. R. Praveen of The Hindu wrote "The Kung Fu Master showcases the kind of action that Malayalam cinema has not witnessed before. The script is shoddy, but high-octane kicks and punches help this Malayalam film stand on its own."
