= Poomaram =

- Theatrical release poster
- Directed by: Abrid Shine
- Written by: Abrid Shine
- Produced by: Dr. Paul Varghese; Abrid Shine
- Starring: Kalidas Jayaram; Neeta Pillai
- Cinematography: Gnaanam Subramanian
- Edited by: KR Midhun
- Music by: Perumbavoor G. Raveendranath; Gopi Sundar; Faisal Razi; Leela L Girish Kuttan; Arackal Nandakumar; Nasil P K.A Anish; Vishnu manu Sivasankar; Sayoojya Das
- Production company: Dr. Paul's Entertainment
- Distributed by: Central Pictures, Popcorn Entertainments (Asia Pacific release)
- Release date: 15 March 2018 (India)
- Running time: 152 minutes
- Country: India
- Language: Malayalam

Poomaram is a 2018 Indian Malayalam-language musical drama film written, co-produced and directed by Abrid Shine. The film stars Kalidas Jayaram and Neeta Pillai in the lead roles. The film marks the debut of Kalidas Jayaram as a lead actor in Malayalam cinema. The film received mixed reviews.

== Plot ==
The film is based on the Mahatma Gandhi University Youth Festival, which takes place every year, where different colleges under the university participate to win the champion trophy.

== Cast ==
- Kalidas Jayaram as Gauthaman C.A, Chairman of Maharaja's College Union
- Neeta Pillai as Irene George, Chairperson of St. Teresa's College Union
- Merin Philip as Friend of Irene
- Architha Anish as Malavika
- Joju George as Police Inspector Daya Swaroop
- Professor Jayaraman Chakiat Siva Rama Menon as Gauthaman's father
- Rohini Nair as Teacher
- Rajesh varma (Script Writer) as Teacher
- Sangeetha S kumar as Gowri
- Sarvasri as Singer
- Shikha Prabhakar as Singer
- Ismath P.I as Singer
- Ramya Krishnan as Chenda player
- Pooja Suchithran as Harmonium player
- Aparna as Tablist
- Sreeshma Chandran as Meenakshi(Meenu)
- Vivek as Vivek C.B(Kili)
- RLV T K Anil Kumar as Dance Master of St.Teresa's College
- Mintu Maria Vincent
- Noufal PN ( Gauthaman's Friend )
- Kunchacko Boban as himself (Cameo appearance)
- Renju Renjimar as herself (Make-up artist)
- Meera Jasmine as herself (Cameo appearance)
- Suresh Thampanoor as Suresh (Cameo Appearance)
- Rasnesh Kannadikuzhi as Sunikuttan

== Production ==
Principal photography began on 12 September 2016 in Ernakulam. Shooting of the movie commenced on 12 September 2016 at Maharaja's College, Ernakulam. St. Kuriakose Senior Secondary School Kaduthuruthy, Mangalam College of Engineering and St. Thomas College, Kozhencherry.

== Soundtrack ==
The first track "Njanum Njanumentallum" was released by Muzik 247 on their YouTube channel in November 2016. The second song "Kadavathoru Thonni" was released in May 2017.

Track listing
No.	Title	Lyrics	Music	Singer(s)	Length
1.	"Kadavathoru Thonni"	Ajeesh Dasan	Gireesh Kuttan	Karthik	4:12
2.	"Njanum Njanumentallum"	Aashaan Babu, Dayal Singh	Faisal Razi	Faisal Razi	3:22
3.	"Ini Oru Kalathe"	Ajeesh Dasan	Leela L Girikuttan	Karthik	4:03
4.	"Mruthu Mandahasam"	Arackal Nandakumar	Arackal Nandakumar	K.S.Chithra	3:54
5.	"Arikilundu Njaanengilum"	Balachandran Chullikkadu	Vishnu Sivasankar	K.S.Chithra	1:40
6.	"Neramayi"	Ajeesh Dasan	Faisal Razi	Karthik, Shreya Ghoshal	5:02
7.	"Desh Raga Thilana"	Lalgudi Jayaraman	Lalgudi Jayaraman	Shikha Prabhakaran, Ismath P I, Sarvasri	2:49
8.	"Ore Sooryanalle"	Balachandran Chullikkadu	Gopi Sundar	Karthik	5:09
9.	"Thaka Tharom"	Nasil P	Nasil P	Nasil P	4:00
10.	"Oru Mamarathinte"	Harinarayanan BK	Sayoojya Das	Karthik	4:46
11.	"Ghosham Dundhubi"	Harinarayanan BK	Perumbavoor G Ravindranath	Kavalam Sreekumar, MK Shankaran Namboothiri	4:03

== Release ==
=== Theatrical ===
The film was scheduled for release in late December 2017, but was postponed to March 2018. The film later released on 15 March 2018.

== Reception ==
=== Critical reception ===
Poomaram received mixed reviews from critics.

Deepa Soman of The Times of India rated the film 3/5 stars and wrote that Poomaram "rides on the strength of a handful of playful moments from the campus and if that wouldn’t trouble you as a viewer, the movie merits your time."

Meera Suresh of The New Indian Express rated the film 3/5 stars and wrote, "Poomaram isn't a please-all movie. It is rich in art, aesthetics and realism, but low in entertainment."

Sowmya Rajendran of The News Minute wrote, "'Nice', they say, is a boring adjective that doesn't say much. And yet, it's this word that describes Poomaram best. This is a nice film with nice people and nice moments. The film doesn't aspire to rise above this and at times, the niceness may get boring. But with so many vibrant faces on screen, so many moments that trigger nostalgia, you get interested once again even if the film loses you in parts."

Jyothisha V. J. of Onmanorama rated the film 3.5/5 stars and wrote, "An intensely delightful lyrical treat, Poomaram is a poetic bloom."

Anna M. M. Vetticad of Firstpost wrote, "Poomaram is a delightfully experimental, contemplative college saga, far removed from the clichés, the ugly misogyny and loudness seen in too many campus films from Mollywood."

Priyanka Sundar of Hindustan Times rated the film 3/5 stars and wrote, "This film was a good experience, but solely because of the music and screenplay. In terms of characters, they were very well-etched supporting characters (especially Kili and the Mohiniyattam teacher of Maharaja College). As there wasn’t enough scope to see Kalidasan perform, this might not have been his best choice for a debut."

Navmi Krishna of The Hindu wrote, "But for all its freshness, Poomaram can not escape the trap of 'leaving the audience with a message' and pretentious preaching. ... Movies invoke different emotions — some invoke empathy, some aspiration. In Poomaram, however, you are both an emotionally invested viewer and one of the peripheral characters."

Mythily Ramachandran of Gulf News wrote, "Poomaram celebrates college life and gently stirs up the nooks of nostalgia."

== Accolades ==
Award	Date of ceremony	Category	Work	Nominee(s)	Result	Ref.
Mazhavil Mango Music Awards	24 August 2018	Best Playback Singer Female	Mruthu Mandahasam	K.S.Chithra	Won	
Mazhavil Mango Music Awards	24 August 2018	Best Playback Singer Male	Kadavathoru Thonni	Karthik	Won	
Mazhavil Mango Music Awards	24 August 2018	Best Debut Singer	Njanum Njaanumentallum	Faizal Razi	Won	
Mazhavil Mango Music Awards	24 August 2018	Special Jury Award	Kadavathoru Thonni	Leela L Girikkuttan	Won	
21st Asianet Film Awards	6–7 April 2019	Best New Face Actor	Poomaram	Kalidas Jayaram	Won	
21st Asianet Film Awards	6–7 April 2019	Best New Face Actress	Poomaram	Neeta Pillai	Won	
Vanitha Film Awards 2019	2 March 2019	Best Newcomer Actor	Poomaram	Kalidas Jayaram	Won	
8th South Indian International Movie Awards	16 August 2019	Best Playback Singer Female – Malayalam	Mrudumandahaasam	K.S.Chithra	Nominated	
8th South Indian International Movie Awards	16 August 2019	Best Playback Singer Male – Malayalam	Neramayi	Karthik	Nominated	
8th South Indian International Movie Awards	16 August 2019	Best Lyricist – Malayalam	Neramayi	Ajesh Dasan	Nominated	
8th South Indian International Movie Awards	16 August 2019	Best Debut Actress – Malayalam	Poomaram	Neeta Pillai	Nominated	
8th South Indian International Movie Awards	16 August 2019	Best Debut Actor – Malayalam	Poomaram	Kalidas Jayaram	Nominated	
