= Alenchery =

- Location in Kerala, India Alenchery (India)
- Coordinates: 8.9301°N 76.9312°E
- Country: India
- State: Kerala
- District: Kollam

Government
  - Type: Gram panchayat

Languages
  - Official: Malayalam, English
- Time zone: UTC+5:30 (IST)
- PIN: 691310
- Nearest city: Punalur

Alenchery is a village in Kollam district of Kerala, India. It lies on the way from Anchal to Kulathupuzha.

== St. Mary's Orthodox Syrian Church ==
St. Mary's Orthodox Syrian Church (Global Marian Pilgrim Centre) is under Malankara Orthodox Syrian Church. The church was established in 1932 in the name of Virgin Mary. In the period of 1938–1974, the Church was served by Vicar Fr. K Gheevarghese Changarampallil.

The church started the feast of the Virgin Mary in September 1965, and the grand celebration started in 1975. Many people attend the feast without caste or religion. Locally, the church is called the second Manarcad Church.

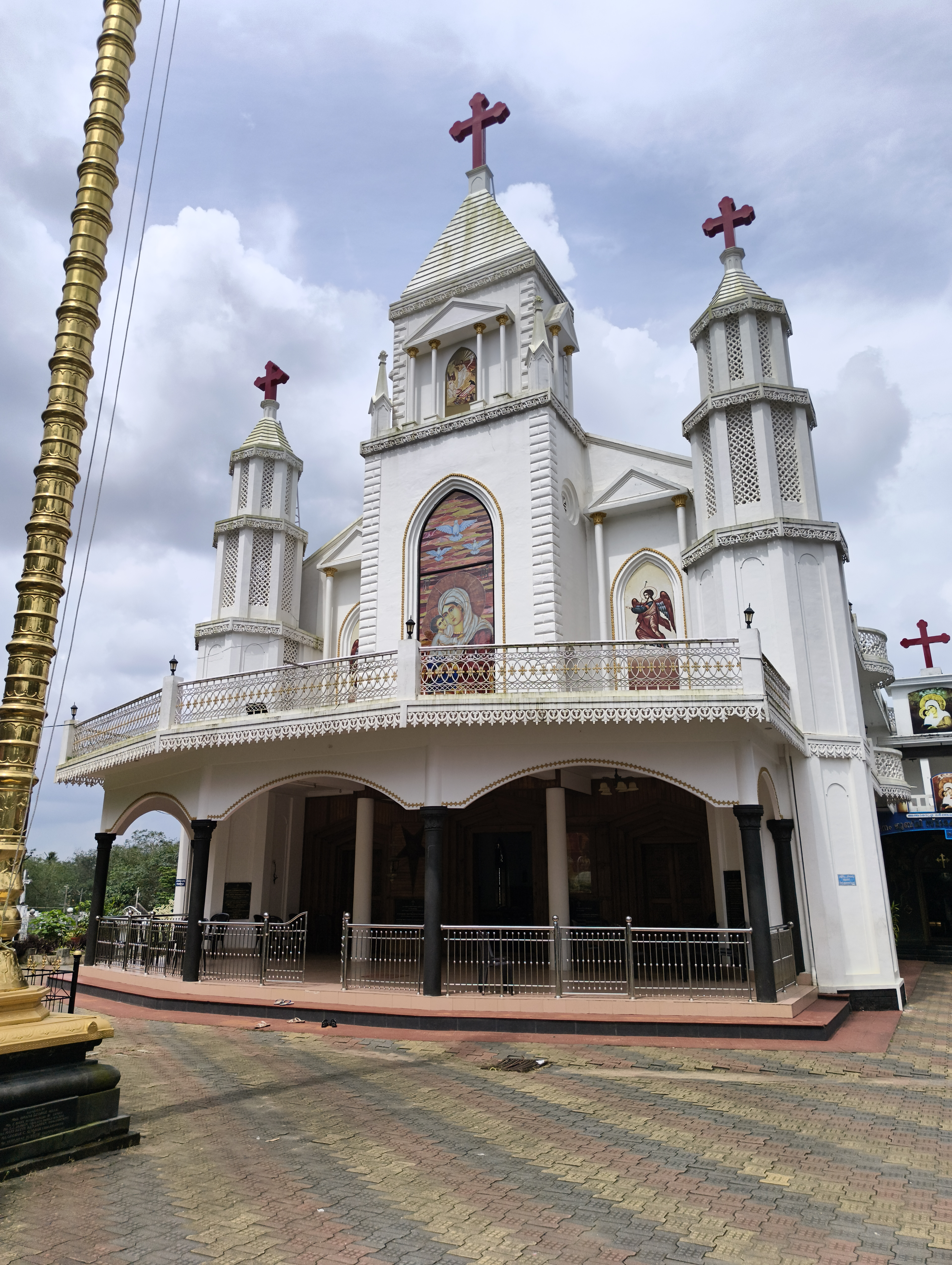
Alencherry St. Mary's church

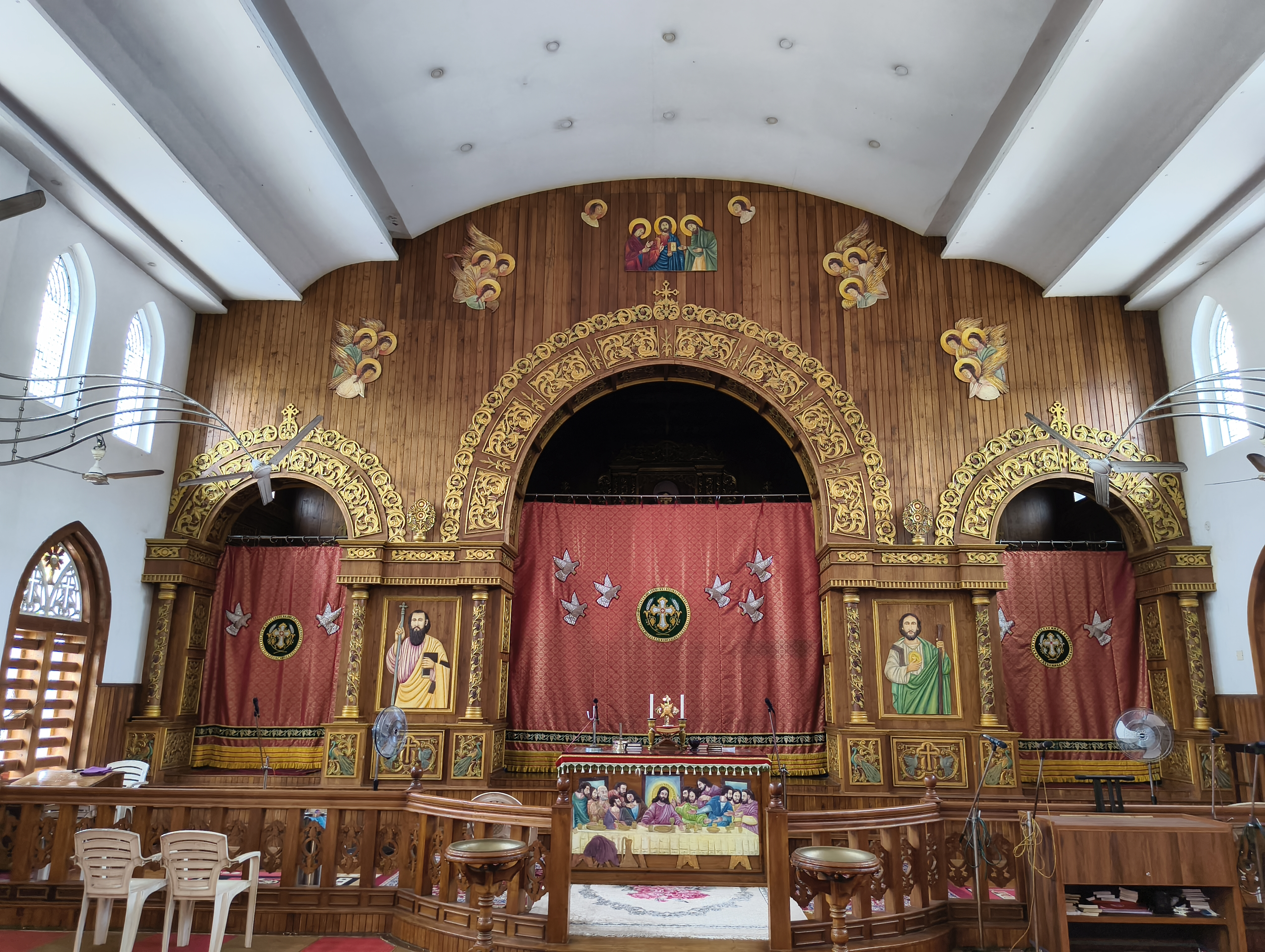
Inside view of Alencherry St. Mary's Church

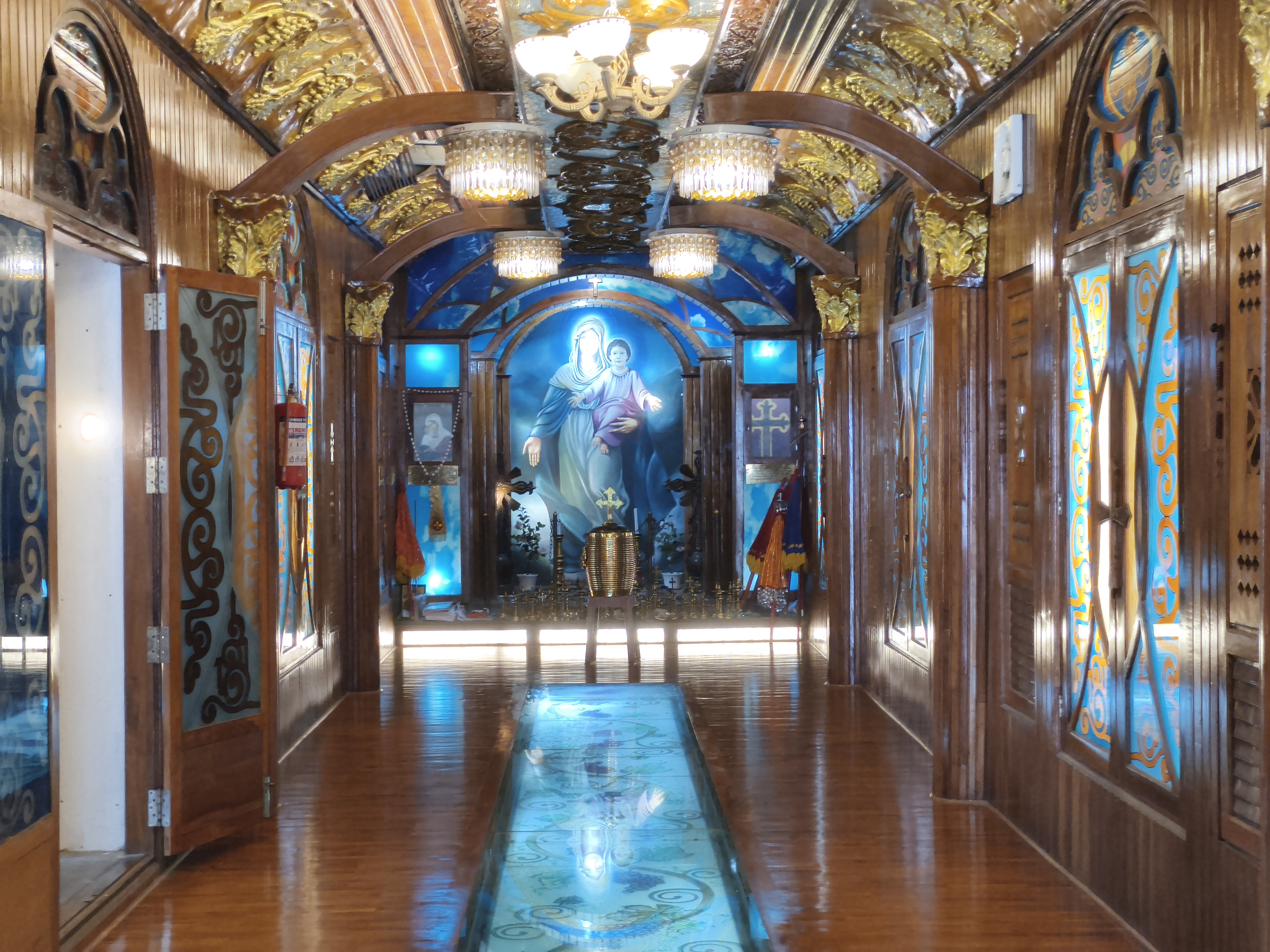
Meditation room of Alencherry St. Mary's Church

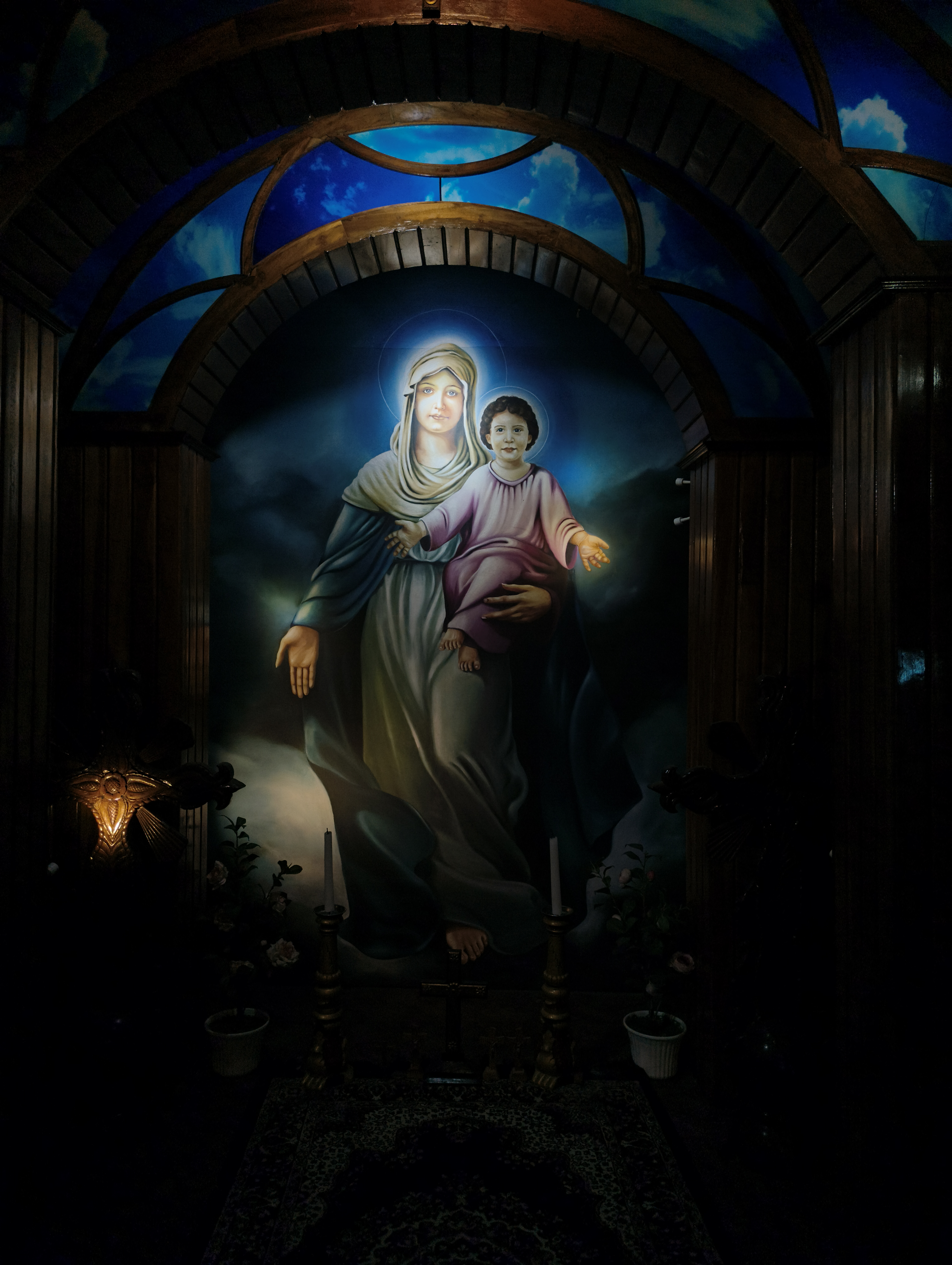
Painting of Virgin Mary in Alencherry Church

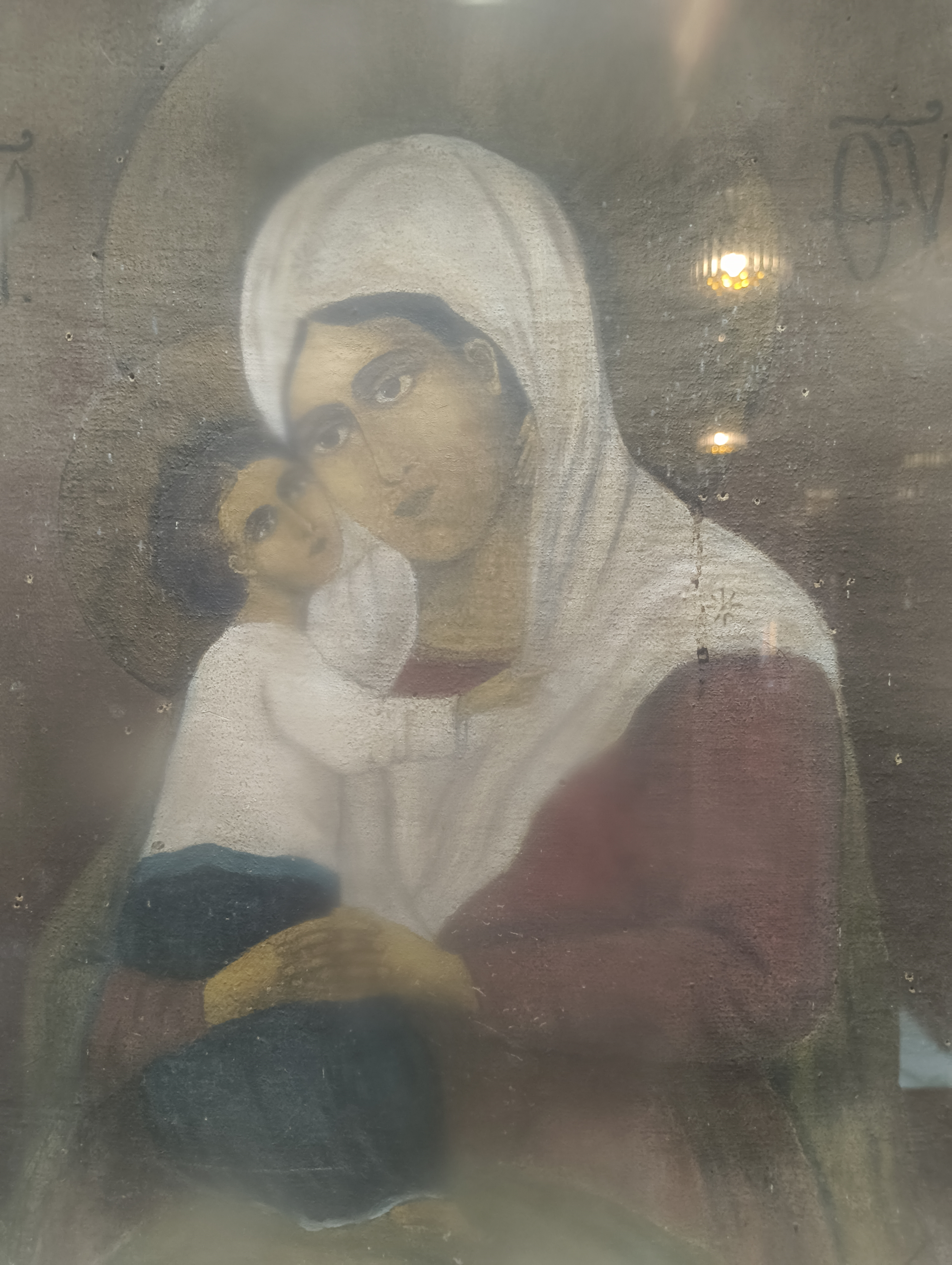
Icon of Virgin Mary in St. Mary's Church, Alencherry

== See also ==
- Anchal
- Kulathupuzha
