= Kalidas Jayaram =

Indian actor (born 1993)

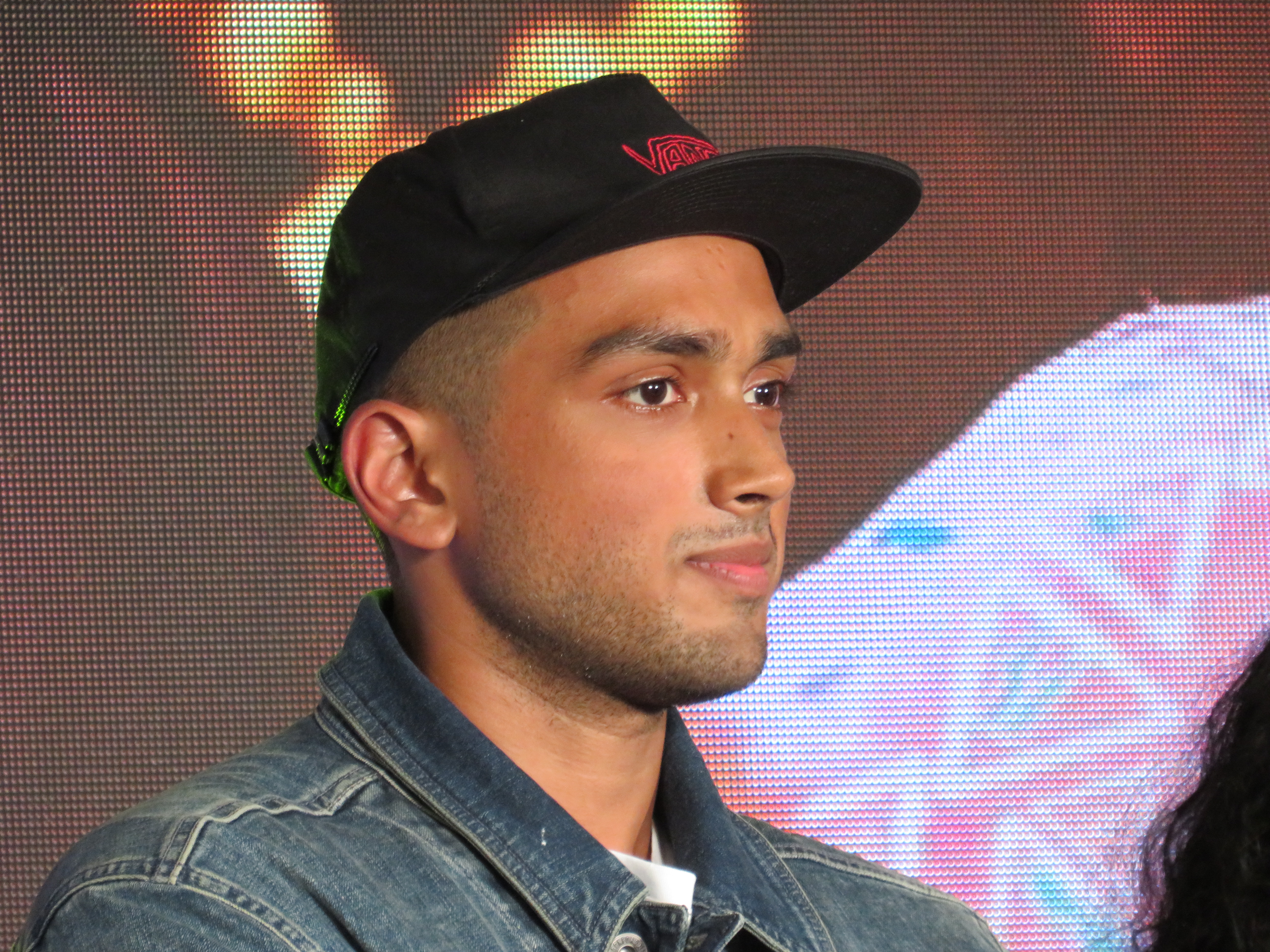
- Born: 16 December 1993 (age 32); Perumbavoor, Kerala, India
- Education: Loyola College, Chennai
- Occupation: Actor
- Years active: 2000‍–‍2003 (child artist); 2016‍–‍present
- Spouse: Tarini Kalingarayar (m. 2024)
- Parents: Jayaram (father); Parvathy Jayaram (mother)

Kalidas Jayaram (born 16 December 1993) is an Indian actor who appears predominantly in Tamil and Malayalam films. The son of film actors Jayaram and Parvathy, Kalidas made his debut in the Malayalam film Kochu Kochu Santhoshangal (2000) at the age of six. Later, he starred in Ente Veedu Appuvinteyum (2003), which won him the National Film Award for Best Child Artist.

== Early and personal life ==
Kalidas was born the elder of two children, to actors Jayaram and Parvathy in Perumbavoor, Kerala. He has a younger sister Malavika. He did his schooling from Padma Seshadri Bala Bhavan, Chennai and his plus-two from Choice School, Cochin, Kerala. He received his bachelor's degree in visual communication from Loyola College, Chennai.

Like his father, Kalidas is skilled at imitating actors, and the mimicry performed during a Vijay TV award show and an advertisement for a chocolate brand made him familiar to people.

== Career ==
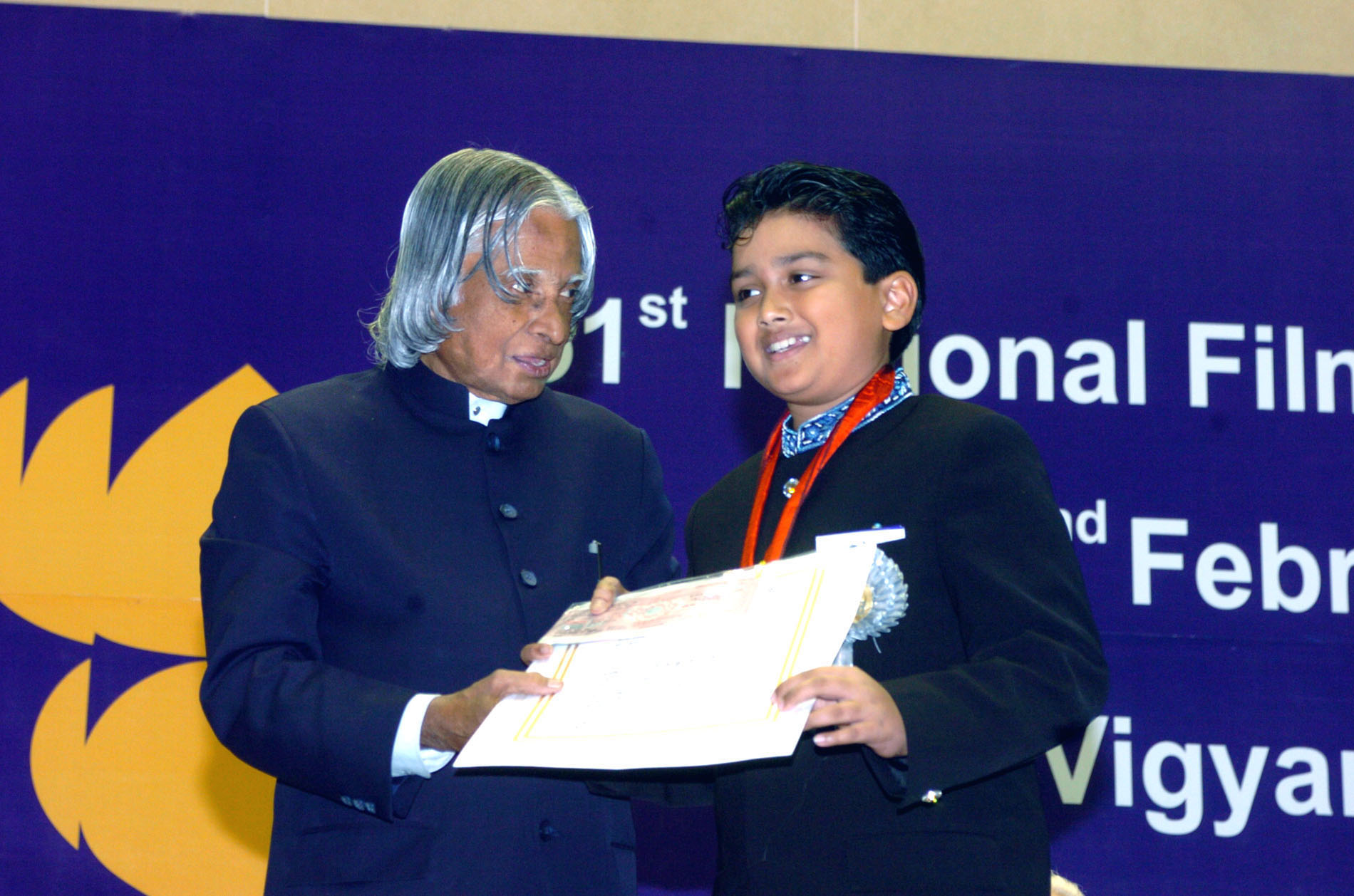
A young Kalidas receiving the Best Child Artist award from Indian president A. P. J. Abdul Kalam

He made his debut in Sathyan Anthikad's Kochu Kochu Santhoshangal (2000). He received the National Award for Best Child Artist for his second film Ente Veedu Appuvinteyum (2003).

In 2016, he made his debut in Tamil cinema with Meen Kuzhambum Mann Paanaiyum (2016).

He made his debut as a lead actor in Malayalam cinema in Poomaram (2018). Next, Kalidas had 3 releases: Mr. & Ms. Rowdy (2019), Argentina Fans Kaattoorkadavu (2019) and Happy Sardar (2019).

His work on OTT, especially in Paava Kadhaigal (2020) have brought him critical acclaim. His role as Sathar in Sudha Kongara's short, Thangam, saw him portray the role of a trans woman. Kalidas played the lead in Balaji Tharaneetharan's second directorial venture Oru Pakka Kathai (2020).

He has played supporting roles in the action films Vikram (2022) and Raayan (2024).

== Personal life ==
Kalidas met Tarini Kalingarayar, a model and Miss Diva 2021 3rd runner-up in 2022. The couple got engaged in November 2023. On 8 December 2024, Kalidas married Tarini in a traditional Hindu wedding ceremony at the Guruvayur Temple, Kerala.

== Filmography ==
Key
| † | Denotes films that have not yet been released |

=== Films ===
List of Kalidas Jayaram film credits
| Year | Title | Role | Language | Notes | Ref. |
|---|---|---|---|---|---|
| 2000 | Kochu Kochu Santhoshangal | Ashok | Malayalam | Child artist | |
| 2003 | Ente Veedu Appuvinteyum | Vasudev | Malayalam | Child artist | |
| 2016 | Meen Kuzhambum Mann Paanaiyum | Karthik | Tamil | | |
| 2018 | Poomaram | Gauthaman | Malayalam | | |
| 2019 | Mr. & Ms. Rowdy | Appu | Malayalam | | |
| 2019 | Argentina Fans Kaattoorkadavu | Vipinan | Malayalam | | |
| 2019 | Happy Sardar | Happy Singh | Malayalam | | |
| 2020 | Putham Pudhu Kaalai | Younger Rajiv Padmanabhan | Tamil | Anthology film; segment Ilamai Idho Idho | |
| 2020 | Paava Kadhaigal | Sathaar | Tamil | Anthology film; segment Thangam | |
| 2020 | Oru Pakka Kathai | Saravanan | Tamil | | |
| 2021 | Backpackers | Khalil | Malayalam | | |
| 2022 | Jack N' Jill | Kesh | Malayalam | | |
| 2022 | Vikram | Prabhanjan | Tamil | | |
| 2022 | Natchathiram Nagargiradhu | Iniyan | Tamil | | |
| 2023 | Rajni | Naveen | Malayalam | Bilingual film | |
| 2023 | Aval Peyar Rajni | Naveen | Tamil | Bilingual film | |
| 2024 | Por | Yuvaraj | Tamil | | |
| 2024 | Indian 2 | Nilesh Krishnaa | Tamil | Cameo appearance | |
| 2024 | Raayan | Manickavelraayan | Tamil | | |
| 2026 | Ashakal Aayiram | Ajeesh Hariharan | Malayalam | | |

Web series

List of Kalidas Jayaram web series credits
| Year | Title | Role | Language | Notes | Ref. |
|---|---|---|---|---|---|
| 2022 | Paper Rocket | Jeeva | Tamil | Released on ZEE5 | |

Discography

List of Kalidas Jayaram film credits for music
| Year | Song | Film | Co-singer | Language | Music director |
|---|---|---|---|---|---|
| 2003 | "Thappo Thappo" | Ente Veedu Appuvinteyum | Jayaram | Malayalam | Ouseppachan |
| 2005 | "Angethala" | Udayon | Shankar Mahadevan and Mohanlal | Malayalam | Ouseppachan |

As voice artist

List of Kalidas Jayaram film credits as voice artist
| Year | Title | Language | Character | Director |
|---|---|---|---|---|
| 2005 | Udayon | Malayalam | Ponnan | Bhadran |

Short films and Music Videos

List of Kalidas Jayaram short film and music video credits
| Year | Film | Role | Language | Notes |
|---|---|---|---|---|
| 2020 | Did You Sleep With Her | Akku | Malayalam | Short film |
| 2021 | Thappu Panniten | Male lead | Tamil | Music album |

== Awards ==
List of awards and nominations received by Kalidas Jayaram
| Year | Award | Category | Film | Result | Ref. |
|---|---|---|---|---|---|
| 2001 | Asianet Film Awards | Best Child Artist (Male) | Kochu Kochu Santhoshangal | Won | |
| 2003 | National Film Awards | Best Child Artist | Ente Veedu Appuvinteyum | Won | |
| 2003 | Kerala State Film Awards | Best Child Artist | Ente Veedu Appuvinteyum | Won | |
| 2003 | Asianet Film Awards | Best Child Artist | Ente Veedu Appuvinteyum | Won | |
| 2017 | 6th South Indian International Movie Awards | Best Debut Actor (Tamil) | Meen Kuzhambum Mann Paanaiyum | Won | |
| 2019 | 21st Asianet Film Awards | Best New Face Actor | Poomaram | Won | |
| 2019 | Vanitha Film Awards | Best New Face Actor | Poomaram | Won | |
| 2021 | Blacksheep Digital Awards | Best Actor OTT | Paava Kadhaigal | Won | |
| 2021 | Behindwoods Gold Icon | Best Actor (Critics) | Paava Kadhaigal | Won | |
| 2021 | JFW Movie Awards | Special Recognition OTT | Paava Kadhaigal | Won | |
| 2021 | 10th South Indian International Movie Awards | Best Supporting Actor (Male) - Tamil | Paava Kadhaigal | Won | |
