= St. Mary's Church, Cheloor =

Church in Cheloor, Kerala, India

St. Mary's Church Cheloor – Edathirinji (in Hindi)
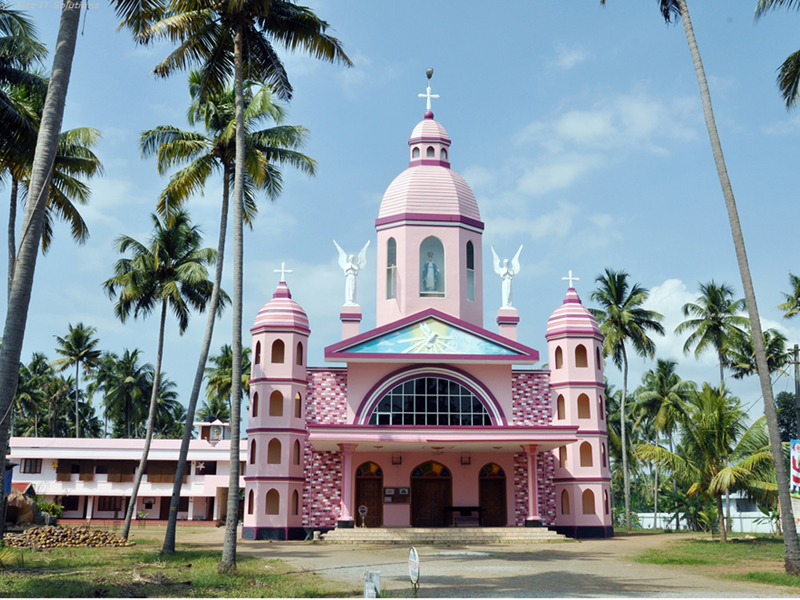
- Front View

Religion
- Affiliation: Syro-Malabar Catholic Church
- District: Thrissur District
- Ecclesiastical or organizational status: Parish
- Governing body: Thrissur Archdiocese

Location
- Location: Irinjalakuda–Moonupeedika Road, Kerala, India
- Interactive map of St. Mary's Church; Cheloor – Edathirinji (in Hindi)
- Coordinates: 10.3393°N 76.1832°E

Architecture
- Established: AD 1880

St. Mary's Church is a Syro-Malabar parish church in Cheloor/Edathirinji, Kerala, India (in diocesan records Mary Immaculate Church, Cheloor). The church is part of the Syro-Malabar Catholic Church under the Syro-Malabar Catholic Diocese of Irinjalakuda.

== Overview ==
1. Parish : Cheloor
2. Forane : Irinjalakuda
3. Patron : Mary Immaculate
4. First Church : 1879
5. Consecration of First Church : 1880
6. Cemetery : 1915
7. Parish Priest Home : 1917
8. Consecration New Church : 22 December 1996
9. Religious Houses : 2
10. Priests : 1
11. Male Religious : 2
12. Female Religious : 10
13. Catholic Population : 2800
14. Catholic Families : 525
15. Family Units : 18

=== Neighbour parishes ===
1. St. Thomas Cathedral Irinjalakuda
2. Our Lady of Dollars Irinjalakuda West (Thanisserry)
3. St Antony's Church Paduva Nagar (Ikkarakunnu)
4. St Sebastian Church Edakkulam
5. St Marys's Church Padiyoor
6. St Joseph's Syrian Church Mathilakam
7. St Joseph's Latin Church Mathilakam
8. St Joseph's Church Kaipamangalam
9. Our Lady of Carmel Church Aripalam

== Chapels ==
- Mary Immaculate Grotto (inside compound)
- Mary Immaculate Grotto (main road view)
1. Fathima Matha Chapel, Kandeswaram
2. St. George Chapel, near Church Road
3. St. Antony's Chappel, Edathirinji
4. St. Joseph Chapel, Americankettu North West
5. Sacred Heart Chapel, Chelookavu
6. St. Sebastian Chapel, Kattikulam
7. St. Antony's Chapel, Edakulam Road
8. St. Alphonsa Chapel, Pothany Road

== Governance ==
- Edavaka Prathinidhi Yogam
- Kudumbasammelana Kendra Samithi

== Kudumbasammelana units ==
1. Little Flower
2. St. Sebastian
3. Dollars
4. Lourd Matha
5. St. John
6. Holy Angels
7. Don Bosco
8. St. James
9. St. Mathew
10. St. Alphonsa
11. Pavanathma
12. St. Vincent De Paul
13. St. Mary's
14. St. George

== Catholic organisations ==
- C.L.C
- Altar Boys
- Gayaka Sangham (Choir)
- Catholic Youth Movement C.Y.M
- Catholic Movement
- Jesus Youth
- St. Vincent De Paul Society
- Franciscan Almaya Sabha
- Mathru Sangam
- Vanitha Commission

== Institutions ==
- St Mary's L.P. School Edathirinji: Lower Primary School under CMC Sisters. Here learning in both Malayalam and English medium in Kerala State Syllabus

== Religious houses in the parish ==
- Jayamatha Convent: Monastery of CMC Sisters
- Bethsaida Bhavan: Old aged home in the boundary of St Mary's Church Cheloor. Malabar Missionary Brothers (MMB) doing this job.

== Fathers, brothers and sisters from parish ==
1. Fr. Joseph Cheruvathur
2. Br.Paulose Arimbuparambil MMB
3. Sr.Stephin CMC

== Former vicars ==
After New Church Building

1. Fr.Joseph Maliyekal
2. Dr. Antony Manjaly
3. Fr.Raphel Puthenveettil
4. Fr.Varghese Perinjeril V.C
5. Fr. Johny Menachery
6. Fr.Martin Payyappilly CMI (Acting)
7. Dr. Joji Palamattah
8. Fr. Joy Puthenveettil
9. Fr.Benny Kizhakkeyil CST (Acting)
10. Fr. Joby Kachappilly CMI (Acting)
11. Fr.Dr. Davis Chenginiyadan
