= Kollam Sudhi =

Indian comedian (1984–2023)

Sudhi Das
- Born: Sudhi Das; 1 January 1984; Kochi, Kerala, India
- Died: 5 June 2023 (aged 39); Kaipamangalam, Thrissur, Kerala, India
- Education: Bachelor of Commerce
- Occupations: Comedian; actor; impressionist
- Years active: 2000–2023
- Spouse: Renu Sudhi
- Children: 2

Sudhi Das (1 January 1984 – 5 June 2023), better known by his stage name Kollam Sudhi, was an Indian comedian, actor, and impressionist who worked in Malayalam television, stage, and cinema. He got a breakthrough on television with the reality TV sketch comedy show Comedy Festival (season 1) on Mazhavil Manorama, where his team emerged as the winner. Sudhi is best known for being a regular cast member of the comedy show Star Magic on Flowers. He starred in more than 40 Malayalam films. He also appeared as a guest performer in several Malayalam comedy shows.

== Early life ==
Sudhi was born in Kochi, Kerala, India to Shivadas and Gomathy. His father worked as a Revenue Inspector with the Cochin Corporation. Sudhi had two brothers, Sunil and Subhash, and a sister, Sibi. His younger brother Subhash predeceased him. Following their father's transfer, the family relocated to Kollam, where Sudhi and his siblings were raised. He received his schooling at Government Boys High School, Valathungal. Sudhi graduated in Bachelor of Commerce (B.Com.) degree.

== Career ==
He started his career as a singer and later forayed into mimicry at the age of 16 or 17. He was part of a team that included Mundackal Vinod, Shobi Thilakan, Raja Saheb, and Shammi Thilakan. Sudhi gained recognition on television by participating in the reality TV sketch comedy competition Vodafone Comedy Stars on Asianet. However, his breakthrough came with the reality TV sketch comedy show Comedy Festival (season 1) on Mazhavil Manorama, where his team emerged as the winner.

He was cast opposite Subi Suresh, portraying fictional romantic couples, in the TV show Made for Each Other on Mazhavil Manorama, which was a contest for real-life couples. Sudhi became a regular member of the comedy show Tamaar Padaar since its inception and continued with its successor Star Magic on Flowers. After making several television appearances, he forayed into Malayalam cinema as an actor. His most notable roles were in Kattappanayile Rithwik Roshan and Kuttanadan Marpappa. His debut film was Chennai Koottam, and since then, he has acted in more than 40 films.

Sudhi's onscreen debut in cinema was in 2015 with the film Bhaskar the Rascal. He went on to act in movies such as Kattappanayile Rithwik Roshan, Big Brother, Nizhal, Keshu Ee Veedinte Nadhan, Children's Park, Kuttanadan Marpappa among others.

== Personal life ==
Sudhi has two sons: Rahul Das and Rithul. His elder son was born to his first wife, who left him and his son when Rahul was one-and-a-half years old. Sudhi faced challenges as a single parent while raising his toddler son and had to take him along to work. Later, Sudhi married Reshma (also known as Renu). Together, they had their second son as his second wife.

=== Death ===
Sudhi died on 5 June 2023, after a car he was travelling along with three colleagues collided with a pickup truck at Kaipamangalam, Thrissur. He suffered a fatal head injury and was taken to a private hospital in Kodungallur, but succumbed to his injuries.

== Filmography ==
=== Television ===
Year	Title	Role	Network	Notes
2006–08	Minnum Thaaram	Contestant	Asianet	
2008	Laughter Kerala	Contestant	Asianet Plus	Won: Best Comedian
2009	Vodafone Comedy Stars	Contestant	Asianet	
2013	Comedy Festival	Contestant	Mazhavil Manorama	Winner
2014	Cinemaa Chirimaa	Artist	Mazhavil Manorama	
2015	Comedy Super Nite	Artist	Flowers	
2015	Made for Each Other		Mazhavil Manorama	
2017	Komady Circus	Artist	Mazhavil Manorama	
2017–19	Tamaar Padaar	Himself	Flowers	Regular member
2019–23	Star Magic	Himself	Flowers	Regular member

=== Films ===
Year	Title	Role	Notes
2015	Bhaskar the Rascal		
2015	Kanthari		
2016	Chennai Koottam		Debut acting work
2016	Kattappanayile Rithwik Roshan		
2017	1971: Beyond Borders		
2018	Theetta Rappai		
2018	Kuttanadan Marpappa		
2019	An International Local Story		
2019	Children's Park	Binu Adimali	
2019	Mask		
2019	Vakathiruvu		
2019	March Randam Vyazham		
2019	Adhyarathri	Sudhi	
2019	Vaarthakal Ithuvare		
2019	Safar		
2020	Maarjaara: Oru Kalluvacha Nuna		
2020	Big Brother	Chakrapani	
2021	Keshu Ee Veedinte Nadhan	Printu	
2021	Nizhal		
2022	Escape: The Dark Hunt		
2023	Kuruvi Pappa		
2023	Kolla	Mesthiri	
2023	Pava Kalyanam		Posthumous release
2024	Swargathile Katturumbu		Posthumous release
