= My Great Grandfather =

- Theatrical release poster
- Directed by: Aneesh Anwar
- Written by: Shani Khader
- Produced by: Manju Badusha; Haseeb Haneef
- Starring: Jayaram; Surabhi Santosh; Baburaj; Divya Pillai
- Cinematography: Sameer Haq
- Edited by: Renjith Touchriver
- Music by: Vishnu Mohan Sithara
- Production company: Achicha Cinemas
- Release date: 6 June 2019
- Country: India
- Language: Malayalam

My Great Grandfather is a 2019 Malayalam-language family-drama film starring Jayaram, Surabhi Santosh, Baburaj, Divya Pillai and directed by Aneesh Anwar. The cinematography was handled by Sameer Haq and the film was bankrolled by Achicha Cinemas, which previously produced Kunchacko Boban-starrer Kuttanadan Marpappa.

The switch on ceremony of the film garnered a lot of media attention as it was attended by the superstars of Malayalam cinema Mammootty and Mohanlal.

The film was shot mainly in Alappuzha, Ooty and Cherthala and was released on 7 June 2019.This movie was a commercial failure.

== Plot ==
Michael, a 40-something happy-go-lucky businessman, is in love with Delna, a pretty young girl in her 20s. On the day of their engagement, a young woman named Sharon, also in her 20s, walks in with her son, claiming to be Michael's daughter turning his carefree life upside down.

The rest of the film is about discovering whether the girl is, in fact, Michael's biological daughter. The film explores the meaning and importance of family ties and friendship with a comical undertone.

== Cast ==
- Jayaram as Michael Tharakan
- Surabhi Santosh as Sharon
- Baburaj as Shivadas, Michael's friend & sharon's biological father
- Divya Pillai as Delna
- Unni Mukundan as Sam Christy, Sharon's husband (cameo appearance)
- Johny Antony as Saddham Hussain,Michael's friend
- Dharmajan Bolgatty as 'Kurukkan' Paulson
- Asha Aravind as Pooja, Sivan's Sister
- Ramesh Pisharody as Father Gabriel
- Vijayaraghavan as Tharakan Kora, Michael's father
- Mallika Sukumaran as Mary, Michael's mother
- Valsala Menon as Kochumol, Michael's grandmother
- Master Harish as Mikkie, Sam's and Sharon's son
- Salim Kumar as Illiyas
- Senthil Krishna as Vijayan
- Baiju Santhosh as SI Vincent Gomas
- Subhish Sudhi as Baiju
- Sunil Sukhada as Louis, Delna's father
- Shivaji Guruvayoor as Chandrappan, Shivan's father
- Sajan Palluruthi as Lassar
- Aristo Suresh as Shavaparambil Porinchu, Paulson's father
- Alankritha Mathew as Nancy, Sharon's mother

== Reviews ==
The Times of India gave the film a 3 on 5, wrote "The first half drags a bit as the director tries to describe the friendship of Michael and Sivan with some consciously introduced scenes. The tale comes alive in the second half along with humorous situational comedy."; "(Aneesh) Anwar wraps it up with a suspense-filled and sentimental climax which offers a message on friendship and its relevance. Overall, My Great Grandfather is a fun ride that conveys the message that for love and friendship age is not a barrier."
