= St. Joseph Chapel, Americankettu North West =

Chapel in Kerala, India

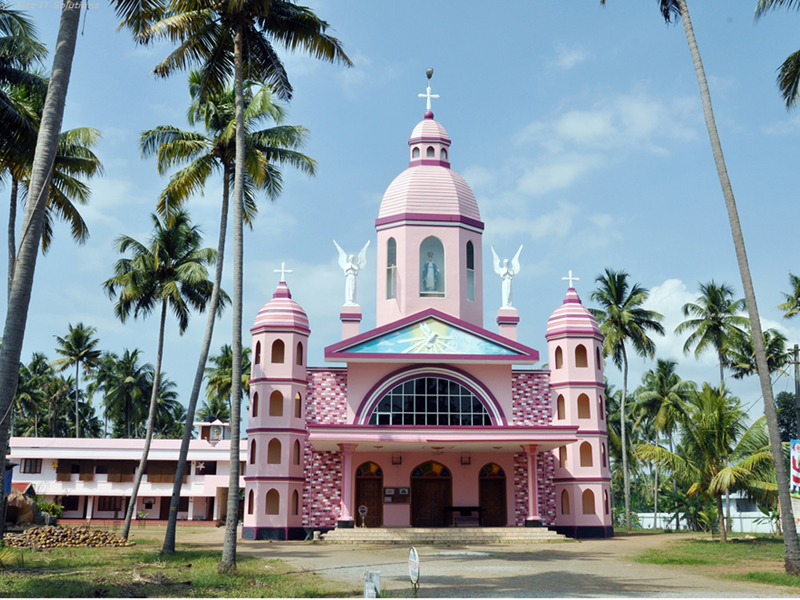
St. Mary's Church, Cheloor

St. Joseph Chapel, Americankettu North West, is in Cheloor, a village in Irinjalakuda, Trichur, Kerala, India, on the coast of the Arabian Sea. The nearest beach is Kakkathuruthi. It has one of the magnificent churches of the Kerala Syro Malabar Catholic community. St. Joseph Chapel, Americankettu North West, is under the governance of Cheloor St. Mary's Church.

Built in 2009–10 and consecrated on 1 May 2010 on the feast of May Day, a special day for the patron of workers, Saint Joseph, this chapel was named after him. Mr. A. O. Jacob of Achangadon built this chapel out of his own money and handed it over to St. Mary's Church.

Daily rosary prayers are offered by the neighbours here in the evening. Built in a modern architectural style it attracts many visitors.
