= Old Harbour Hotel =

Heritage boutique hotel in Fort Kochi, Kerala, India

Coordinates: 9°58′02″N 76°14′33″E

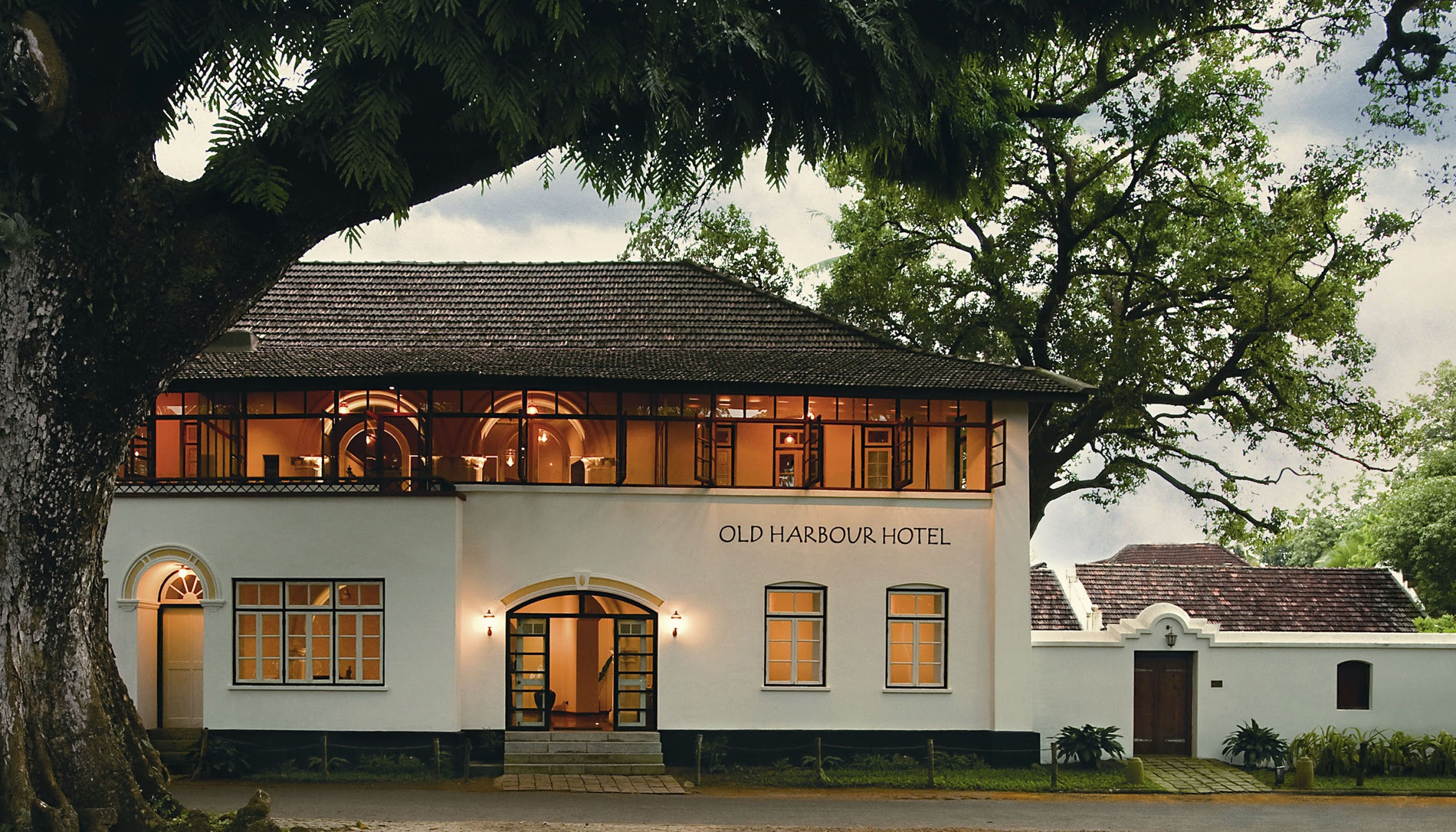
- Old Harbour Hotel entrance in 2006

General information
- Location: Fort Kochi, Kochi, Kerala, India
- Opening: 17th century (origins); 2006; 20 years ago (as heritage hotel)

Old Harbour Hotel, historically known as the Old Harbour House, is a boutique heritage hotel located in the city of Kochi in the state of Kerala, India. It was built during the Portuguese colonial period, almost completely rebuilt by the Dutch in the 17th century, and later modified by the British. In 2006, it was carefully restored by German architect Karl Damschen with many references to its colonial origins and was opened as a boutique hotel.

== History ==
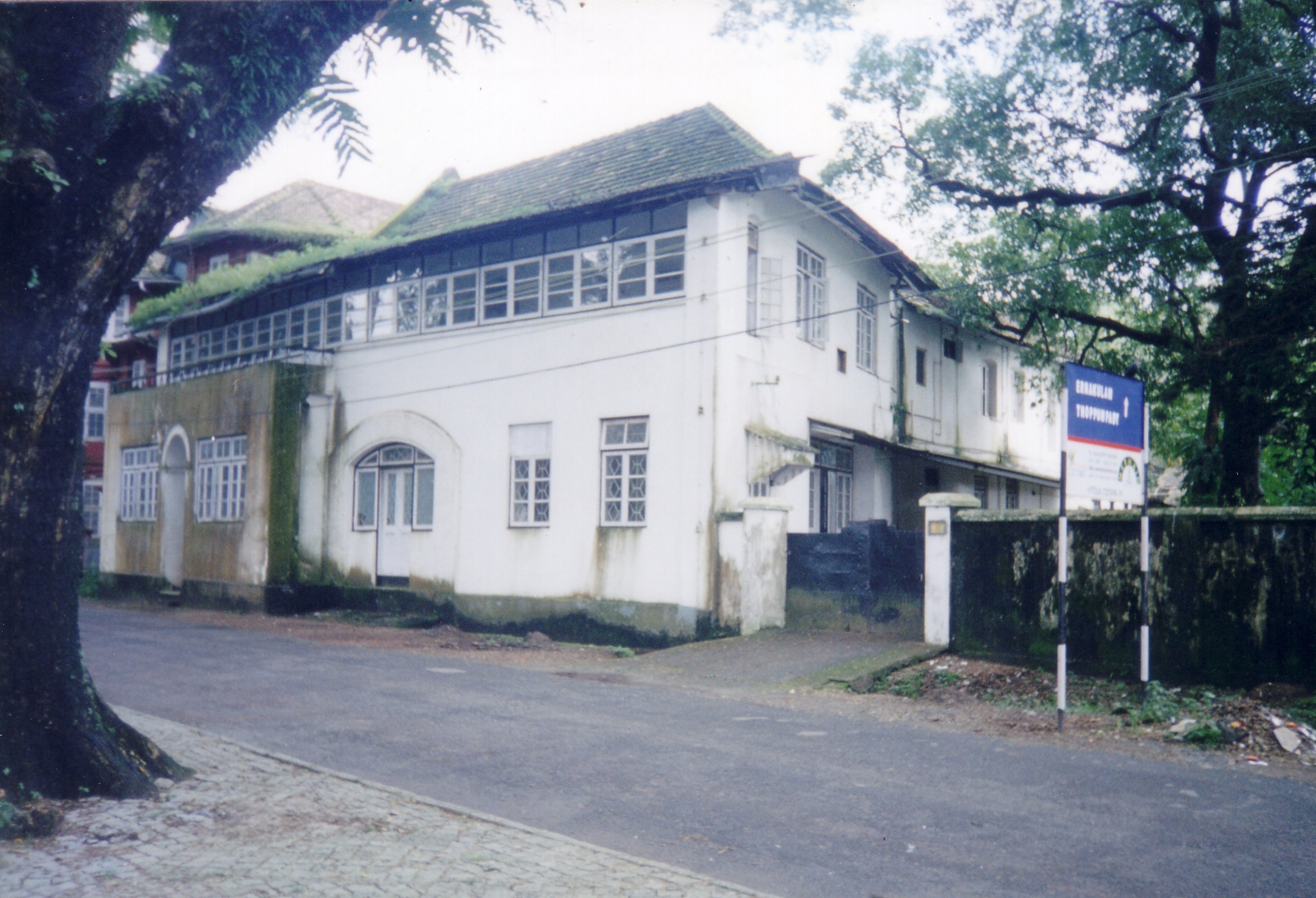
Old Harbour House before renovation

Historians have different opinion regarding the origins of the Old Harbour House. As per multiple sources, it was originally built during the Portuguese colonial period. The building was later expanded by the Dutch in the 17th century. Known as the first hotel in Old Cochin, the Old Harbour House later served as a residential lodge for English tea brokers until it was left unused for a period of time. The property was eventually acquired by Kochi-based entrepreneur Edgar Pinto. In 2006, Swiss-German architect Karl Damschen restored the building and was opened as a heritage boutique hotel.

== See also ==
- Koder House
