= Syam Seethal =

Indian filmmaker

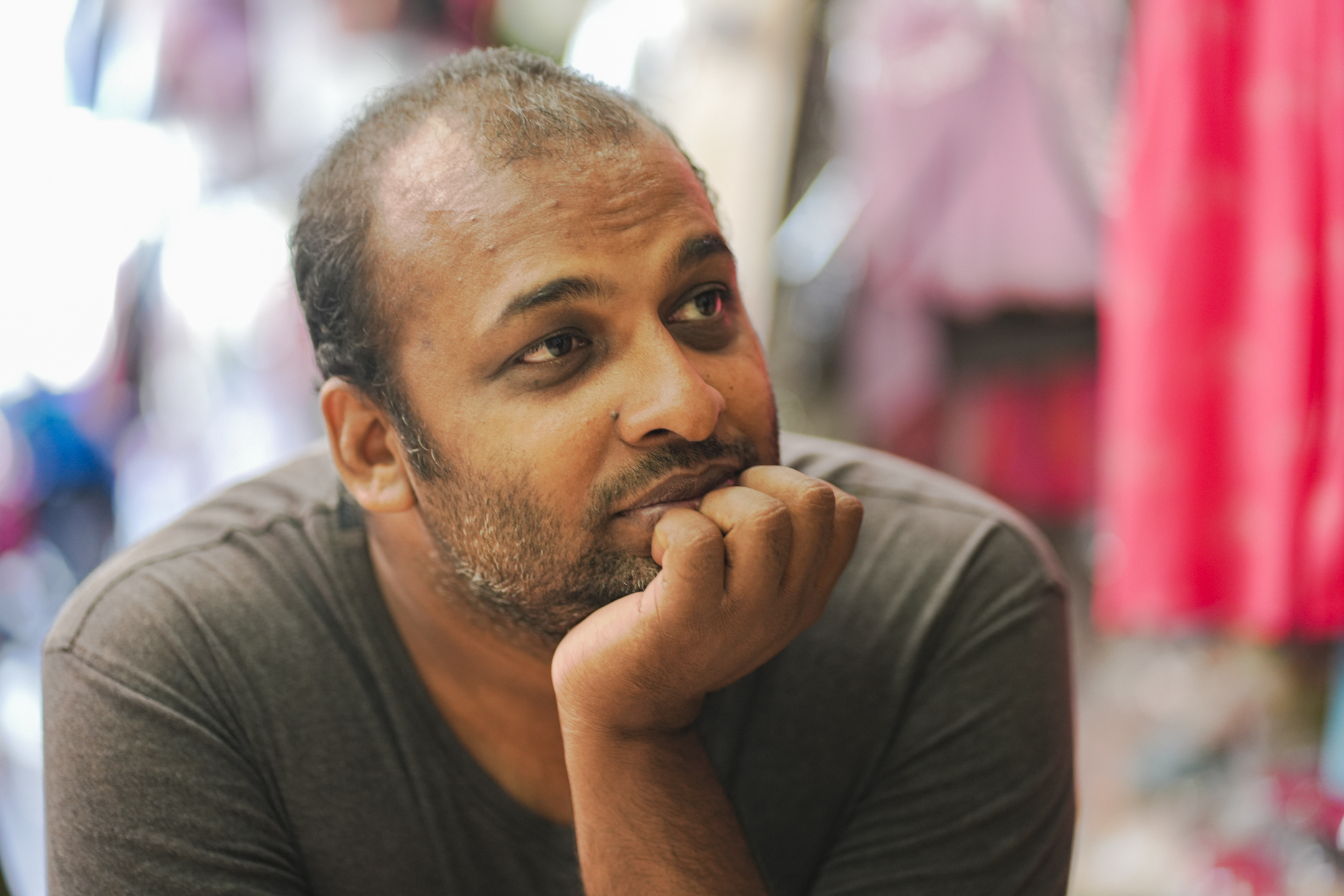
- Syam Seethal
- Born: Kerala, India
- Occupations: Actor, writer, filmmaker
- Years active: 2004–present
- Spouse: Sreekutty Syam Seethal
- Awards: 'Yes, I am the Change' social film making challenge. First prize for 'Cocoon'.

Syam Seethal (Kerala, India) is an actor, filmmaker and screenwriter in Malayalam cinema.

== Early life and education ==
He hails from Thoniyakavu, North Paravur, in Kerala state, India. He studied to be a nurse and passed on the chance to work abroad to pursue his dream of working in the movies. He is married to Sreekutty Syam Seethal.

== Career ==
He wrote the script of the movie Kinavalli. He assisted Shibu Prabhakar on the movie Duplicate. He is also credited as assistant director for Sugeeth on all his movies.

He has also made short films. His short film Cocoon won the first prize in the "Yes, I am the Change" social filmmaking challenge in 2017.

== Filmography ==
=== As director ===
| Year | Title | Language | Notes |
|---|---|---|---|
| 2017 | Cocoon | Malayalam | |

=== As Screenwriter ===
| Year | Title | Language | Notes |
|---|---|---|---|
| 2018 | Kinavalli | Malayalam | Vishnu Ramachandran is co-writer. |

=== As actor ===
| Year | Title | Role | Notes |
|---|---|---|---|
| 2004 | The Journey | Rajan | |
| 2004 | Nerkku Nere | – | |
| 2021 | Bachelors | Aashiq | |
