= Surabhi Santosh =

Indian Actress

- Born: Trivandrum, India
- Education: B.A., LL.B.
- Occupations: Model; Actress; Classical dancer
- Years active: 2011 - 2014; 2018 - present

Surabhi Santosh is an Indian Actress, model and classical dancer and lawyer who works predominantly in Malayalam films and TV series along with some Kannada and Tamil films. She made her debut in films with director S Narayan’s Dushtaa (2011).

== Personal life ==
Born in Trivandrum to Malayali parents Sindhu and Santosh Kumar, who is a former Colonel in the Indian Army, she did her schooling in various schools around the country. She is a B.A., LL.B(law) graduate, Bharatanatyam dancer and plays the veena. She currently resides in Bengaluru. Even though Surabhi shares a similar name with 2 other active south-Indian actress Surbhi and Surabhi Lakshmi, she wanted to keep her birth name as a tribute to her parents.

Surabhi married singer Pranav Chandran in March, 2024 at Kovalam.(1)

== Career ==
Surabhi made her acting debut in veteran filmmaker S. Narayan's action drama film, Dushtaa (2011) opposite Pankaj. She then appeared in Jataayu, another Kannada film in 2013. During the release of the film, another co-star Roopashri was critical of the team for featuring Surabhi heavily in the promotions ahead of her.

In 2017, her long delayed Tamil film, Aayirathil Iruvar (2017) by Saran was released after being in production for three years. Featuring her opposite Vinay, the actress was named Swasthika by the director, for this film.

After a short break of three years taken to complete her graduate degree, she returned to acting with the Kannada film, 2nd Half. When the film hit theatres, her role in it was widely appreciated by critics and audience alike. The New Indian Express, in its review, wrote "Surabhi Santhosh is the soul of the film with the revolving mostly around her. Even though she doesn't have much screen space, 2nd Half doesn't make for a complete picture without her". Sandalwood Cinema mentioned "Surabhi Santhosh is also a terrific performer you cannot miss" while CiniBuzz appreciated her choice of comeback film, stating that, "Surabhi in her come back to Kannada cinema after four years has picked a good role. She is a treat to watch on screen".

Surabhi has marked her debut in Malayalam with the 2018 film Kuttanadan Marpappa in which Kunchacko Boban plays the lead. Her next release in Malayalam, director Sugeeth's fantasy-horror film Kinavalli was well received and opened to positive reviews. Her character in the film was appreciated with Deccan Chronicle and The Times of India stating that she, along with the other actors in the film, "delivered a commendable performance" and "performed well" respectively.

Her first release in 2019 was the Malayalam film An International Local Story directed by the established actor/comedian Harisree Ashokan. She was later seen in My Great Grandfather with actor Jayaram. She essayed a cameo role in Margamkali directed by Sreejith Vijayan with whom she had earlier worked in Kuttanadan Marpappa and in Kalidas Jayaram-starrer Happy Sardar.

In 2024, Surabhi made her Television Debut with the Malayalam language television series called Pavithram which began airing in Asianet and found critical and commercial acclaim as a complete family series. The series has currently crossed 250 episodes..

== Filmography ==
- All films are in Malayalam language unless otherwise noted.

Year	Title	Role	Notes
2011	Dushtaa	Pathi	Kannada film
2013	Jatayu		Kannada film
2017	Aayirathil Iruvar	Bhumika	Tamil film
2018	Kuttanadan Marpappa	Annie	
2018	2nd Half	Saranya	Kannada film
2018	Kinavalli	Ann	
2019	An International Local Story	Lachu	
2019	My Great Grandfather	Sharon	
2019	Margamkali	Hima	Cameo
2019	Happy Sardar	Punjabi Girl	Guest appearance
2022	Night Drive	Amina	
2022	Naalam Mura	Dream girl	Kolunthu song
2024	Thrayam	Jasmine	
2025	Aap Kaise Ho	Riya	

== Television ==
- All TV series are in Malayalam language.

Year	Title	Role	Channel	Notes
2024–2026	Pavithram	Vedha	Asianet	
2025	Snehakkoottu	Vedha	Asianet	Cameo
2026	Comedy Cooks	Guest	Asianet	
2026	Star Singer	Guest	Asianet	
2026–present	Pavithram 2	Vedha	JioHotstar	

== Awards ==
Asianet Television Awards (2024)

- Popular Actress
- Popular Star Pair

== Other works ==
Year	Work	Particulars
	Wagh Bakri Tea	Advertisement
	Pothys	Advertisement
	M for Marry	Advertisement
2021	Mayathe	Malayalam Music Video
