= Karl Damschen =

German architect

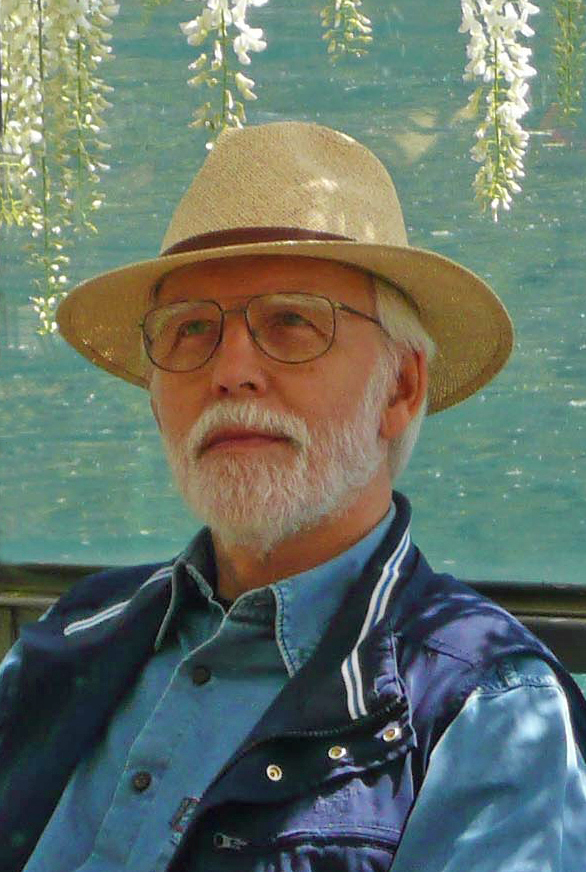
Karl Damschen in 2018

Karl Damschen (born 15 July 1942 in Gelsenkirchen, Germany) is an architect working in Switzerland and mainly in Kerala, India. His buildings are grounded in the climatic and historico-cultural conditions of each place, and they are significant for the recognition of the great architectural resources of India.

== Education and career ==
In 1963, Damschen began his studies at the Staatliche Ingenieurschule für Bauwesen Kassel (now University of Kassel), which he completed as a grad. Engineer. After studying with Paul Friedrich Posenenske at the State College of Arts Kassel (now University of Kassel), Damschen obtained his diploma as Architect HbK in 1970. He then moved to Switzerland, and he worked from 1971 to 1981 as a department head in the Helfer Architekten AG office in Bern.

In 1982 he founded his own company, Architektur Atelier Damschen in Bern, Switzerland. It was here that he worked on the Ascom office building in Bern. In 1985, upon winning a competition for the State College of Technology and Architecture Fribourg (Hochschule für Technik und Architektur Freiburg) in Switzerland, he, along with his partner Daniel Herren, founded their office Herren + Damschen Architects + Planners AG in Bern. Here they worked on several competitions including the urban planning of Löwenplatz in Luzern and urban planning of Thörishaus in Switzerland for which they were conferred the highest Award.

State College of Technology and Architecture Fribourg (Switzerland)

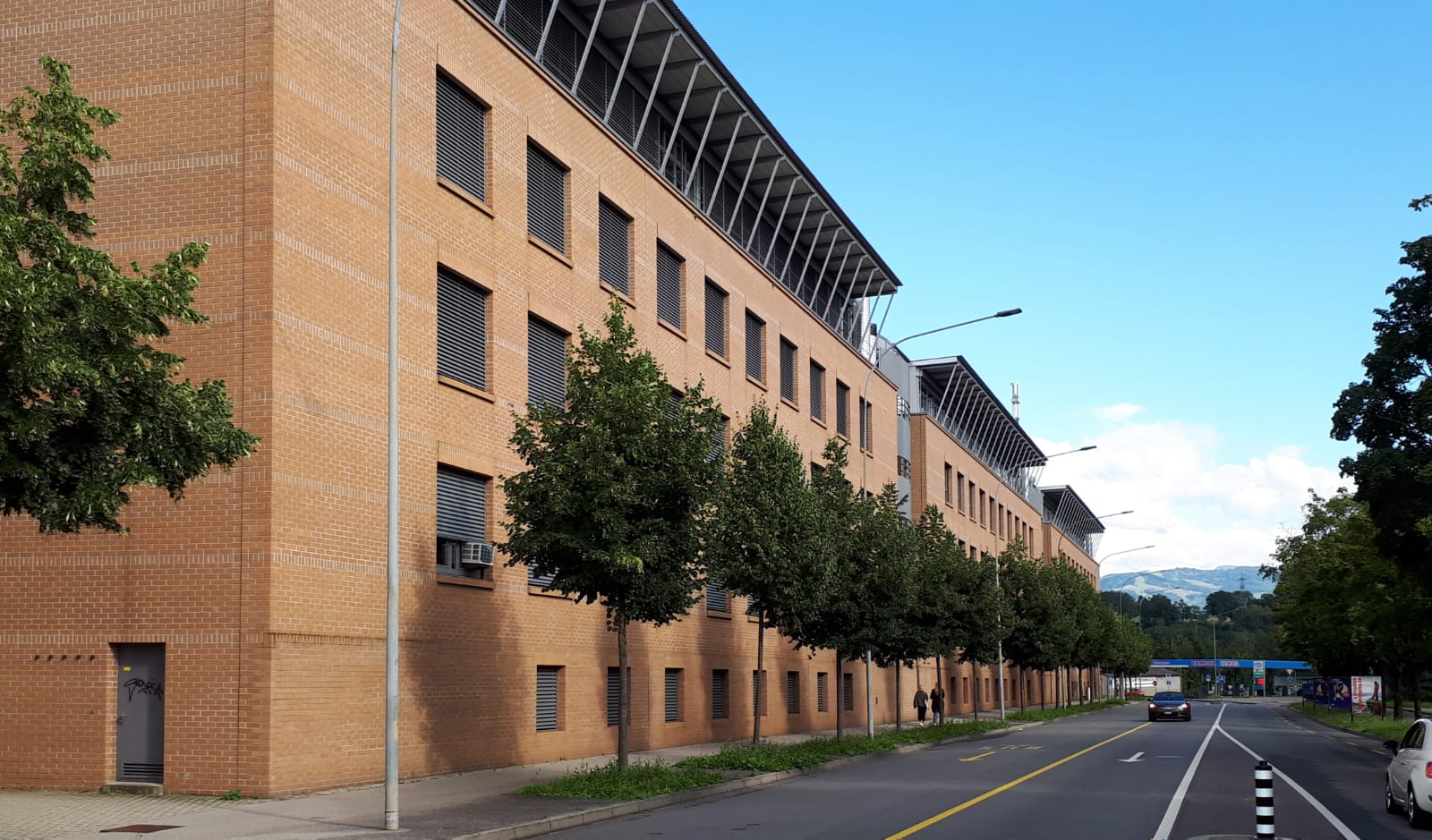

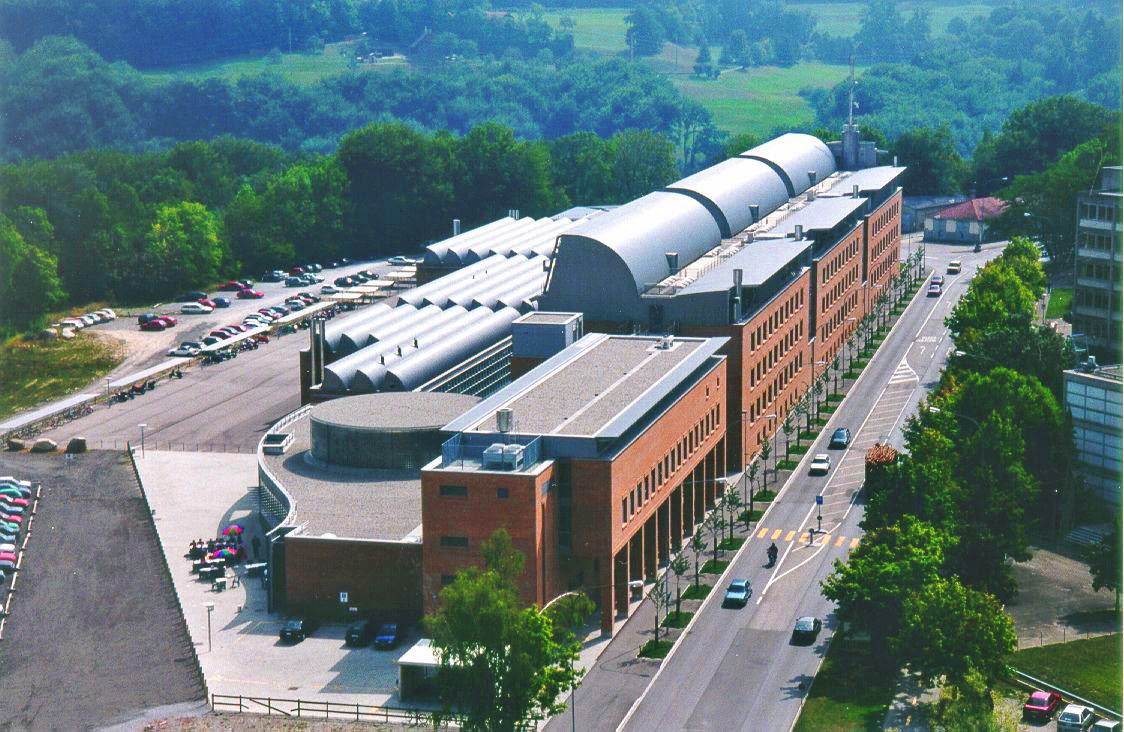

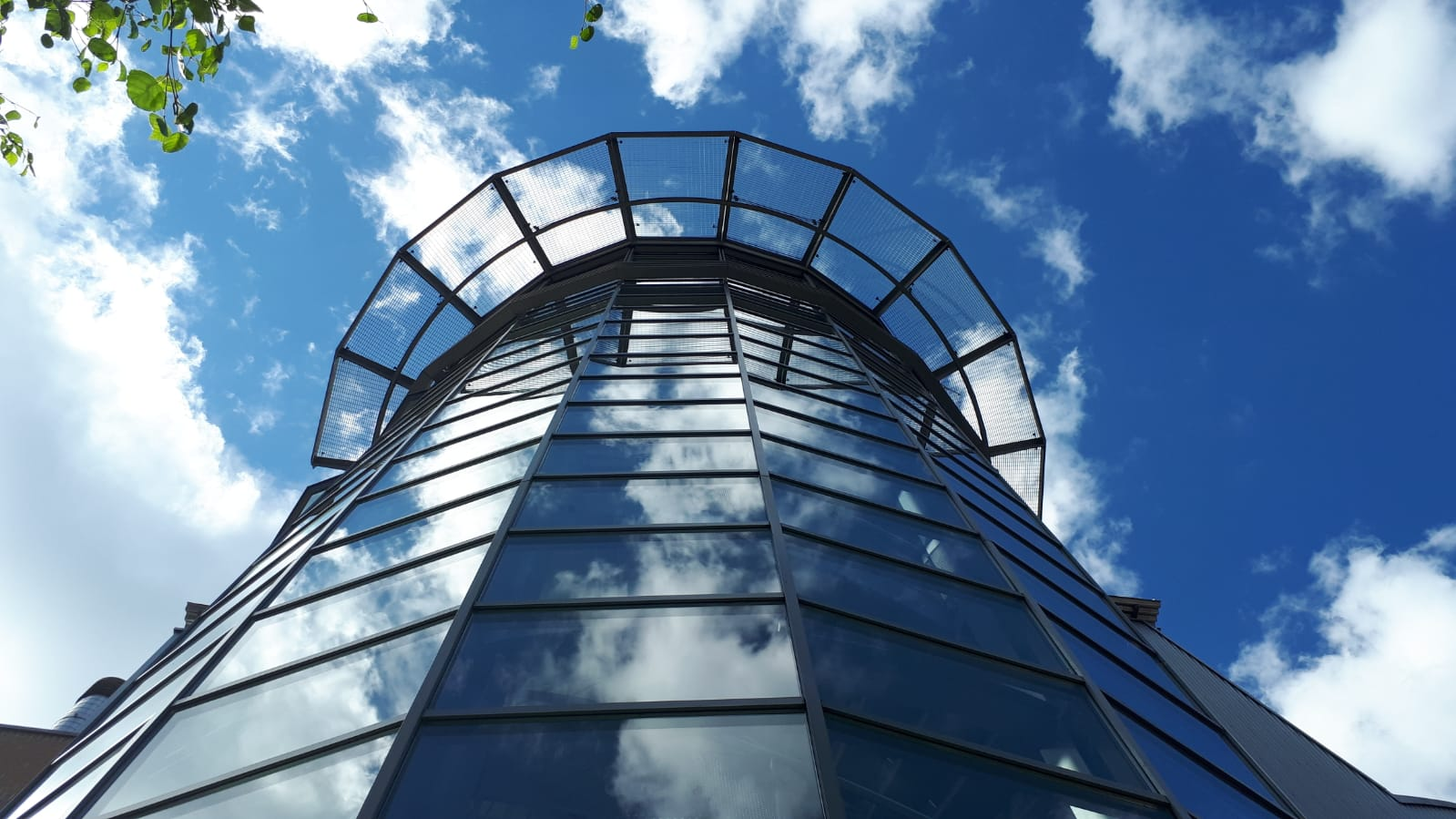

== India ==
In 1976, Damschen embarked on a significant one-year trip by caravan to India and Sri Lanka where he explored the architecture of these countries in detail. This marked the beginning of a lasting relationship with India. From then on, he spent several months each year in Kerala, the southern state of India where he studied first hand, the traditional construction technologies of highly skilled local carpenters. He stated this in an interview with Indian Architecture & Builder Magazine (IA&B):

"IA&B: What is your comment on the traditional architecture of Kerala?...
KD: I am now talking about Kerala’s traditional wooden architecture with its most important building, the Padmanabhapuram palace. This kind of architecture was not designed and built by architects but by master carpenters (Acharis)..."

His fascination with India led to his decision to work as a consultant architect in Kerala in 1995. The first hotel project designed by Damschen in Kerala, was the Surya Samudra Beach Garden (Kovalam) in the 1980s, consisting of several traditional wooden houses carefully dismantled and reassembled on site. Karl Damschen earned his reputation as an architect-conservator in India by converting several heritage and colonial buildings in South India, especially in the old port city of Kochi, where the Portuguese established their first trading post in India as early as 1502. A good example of this is the renovation and reconstruction of the Old Harbour House, an approximately 300-year-old house built by the Dutch.

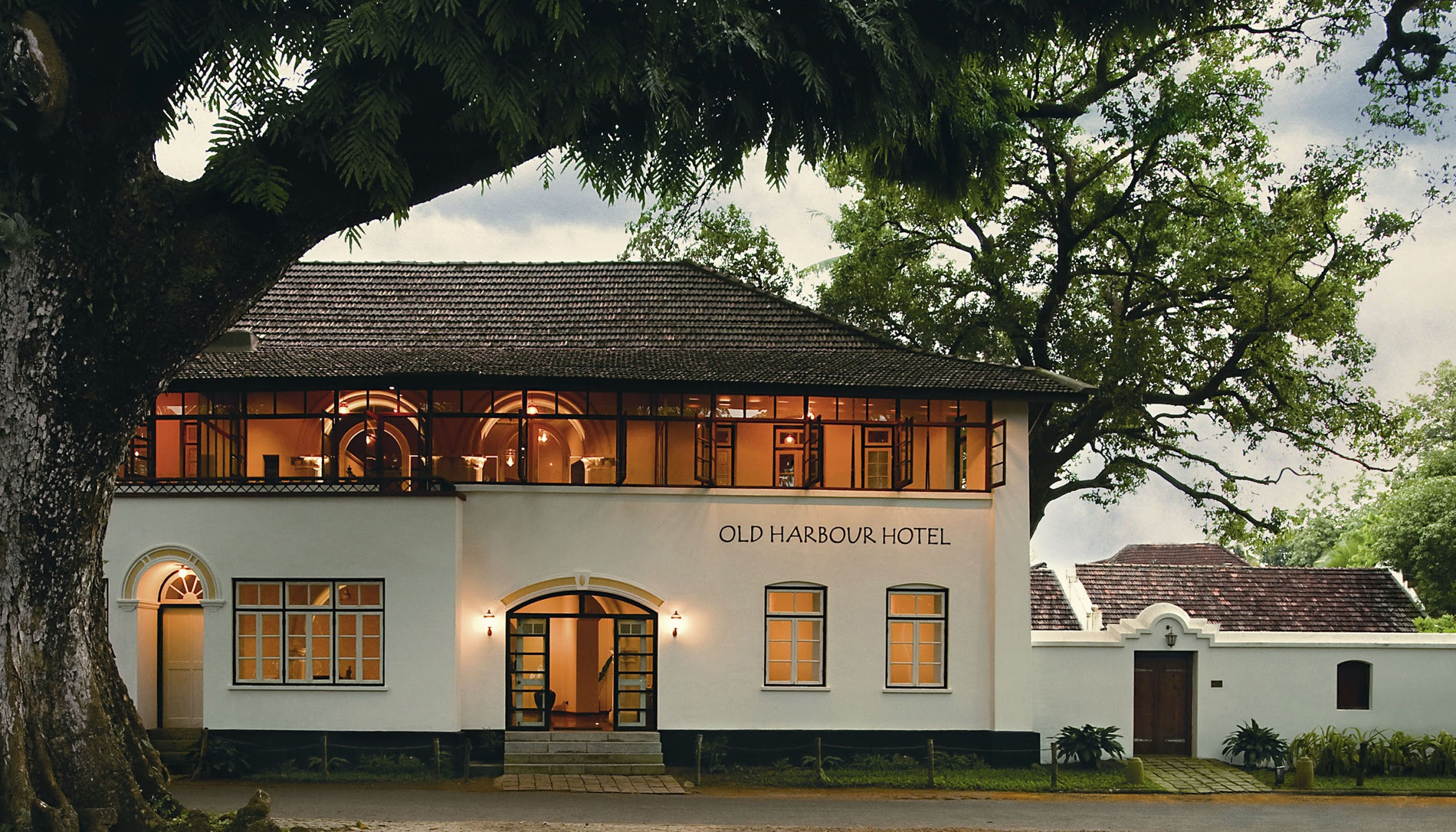
Old Harbour Hotel

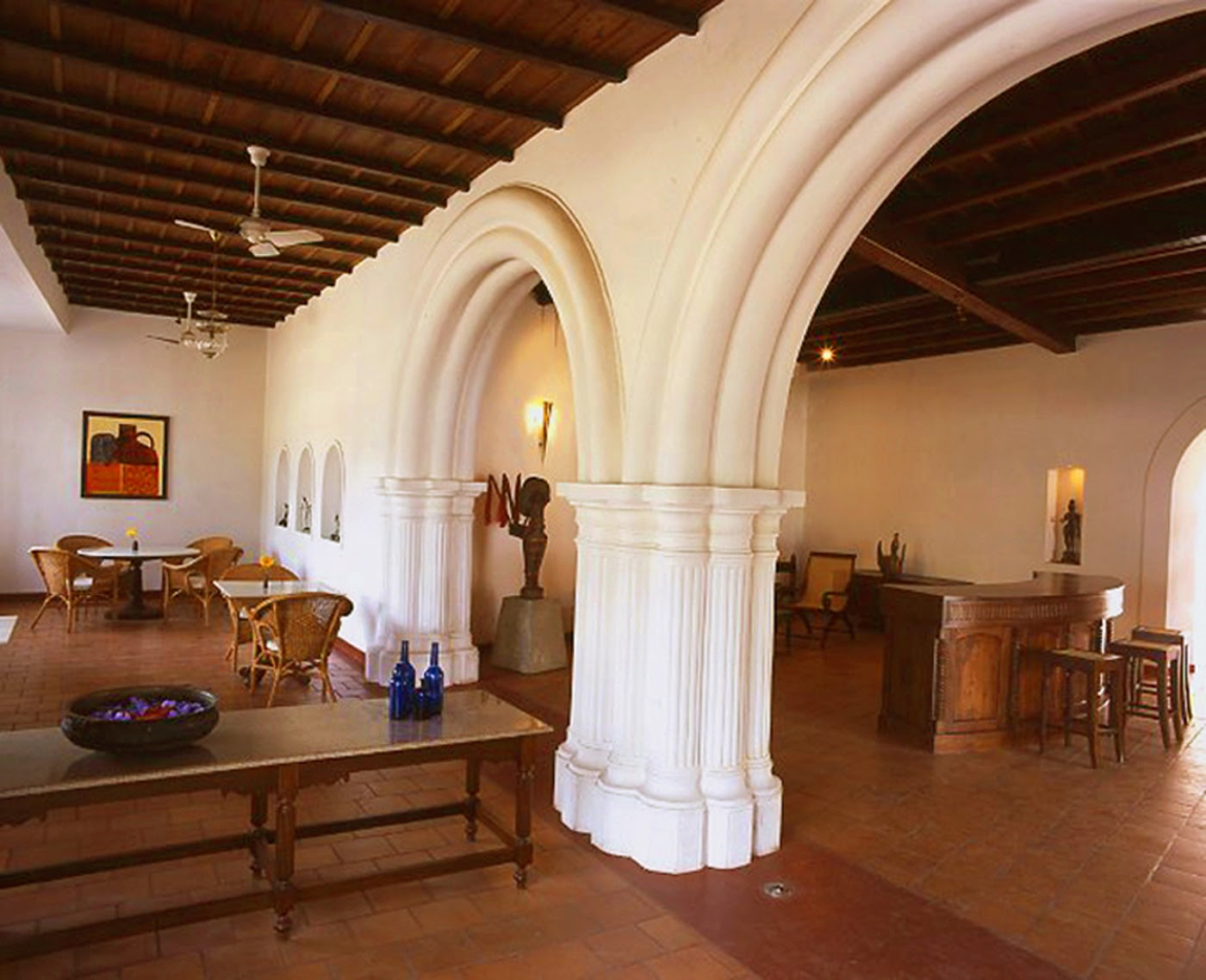
Lobby

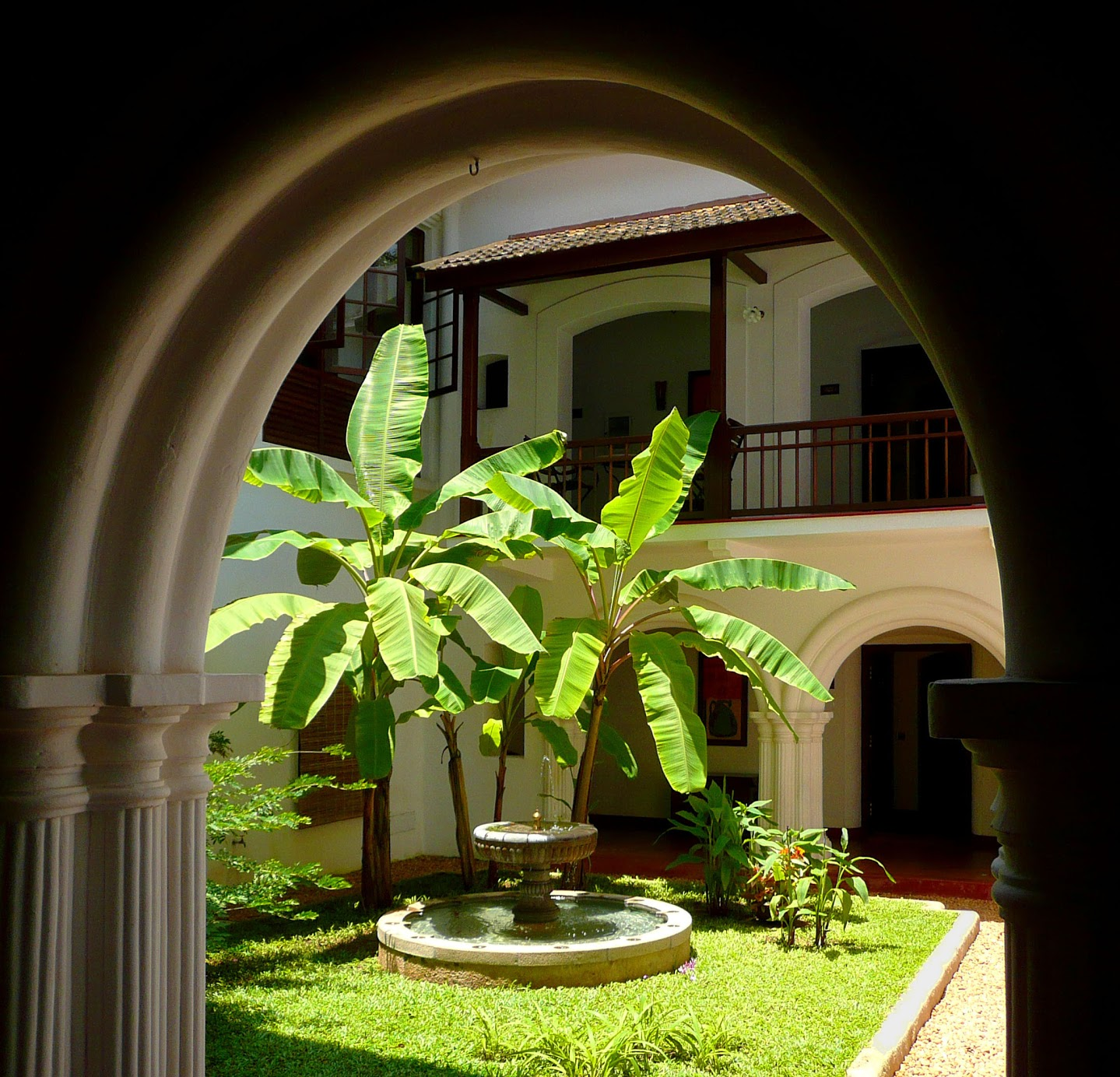
Courtyard

Another Dutch building once used for the spice trade in Jew Town, Kochi, was converted into the Ethnic Passage. The restoration of the Kashi Art Gallery in Fort Kochi is another example.

These projects became a paradigm for several hoteliers and property owners and resulted in many of the remarkable heritage houses being saved from destruction. His work has also been significant in the country's recognition of its great architectural resources. Asked about his favorite projects of classical Indian architecture, Karl Damschen said:

"Certainly the wooden Padmanabhapuram palace because of its subtle adaptation to the location. It also takes account of all climatic and cultural circumstances. Its richness of detail and the dealing with the inner and outer spaces make this building so unique and special.“

In 2001, he was appointed as Conservation Architect to the World Monuments Fund, New York for the restoration of the clock tower of the 450 year old Paradesi Synagogue in the historic Jew Town of Kochi.

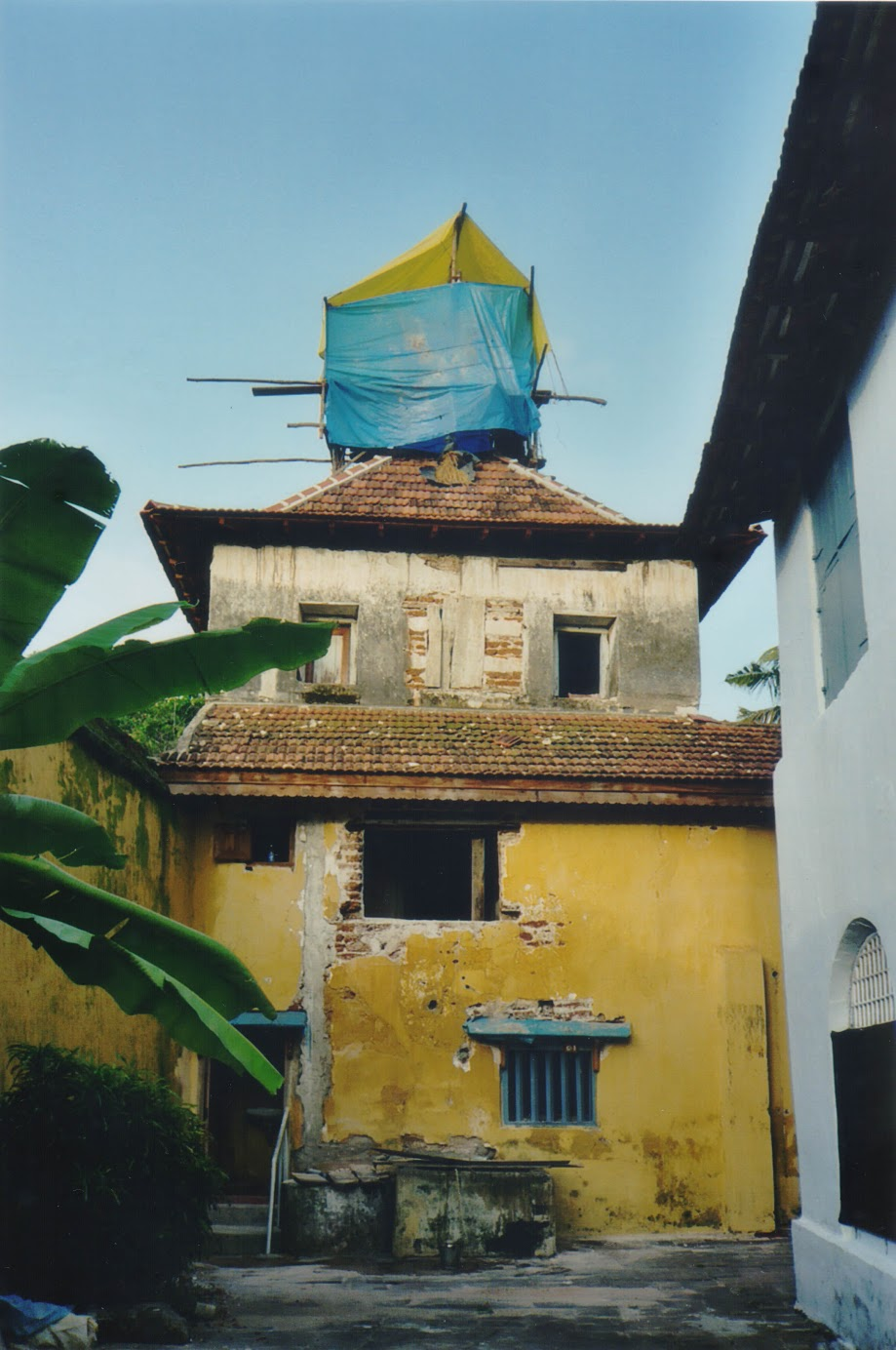
Clock tower of the Paradesi synagogue (2011)

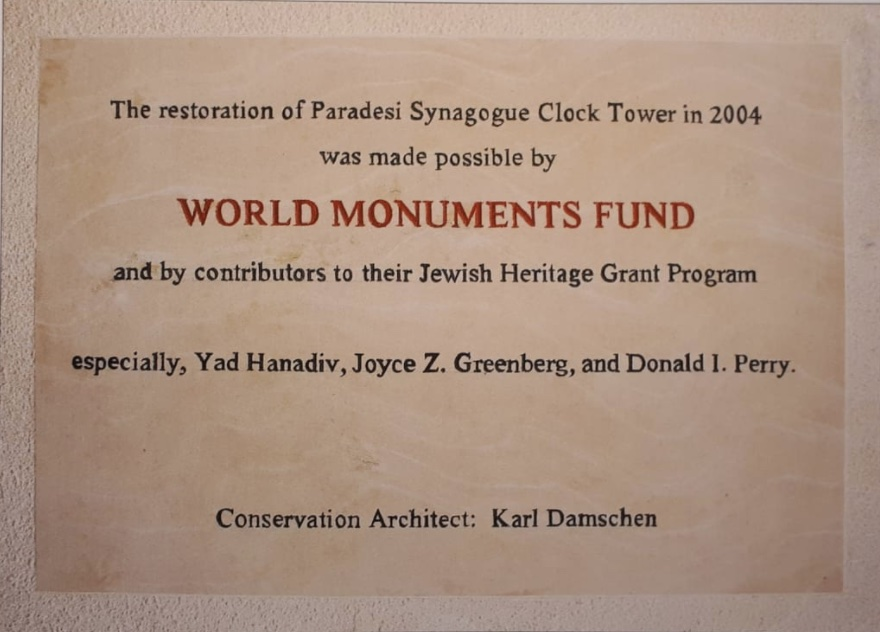
Plaquette in the Paradesi synagogue

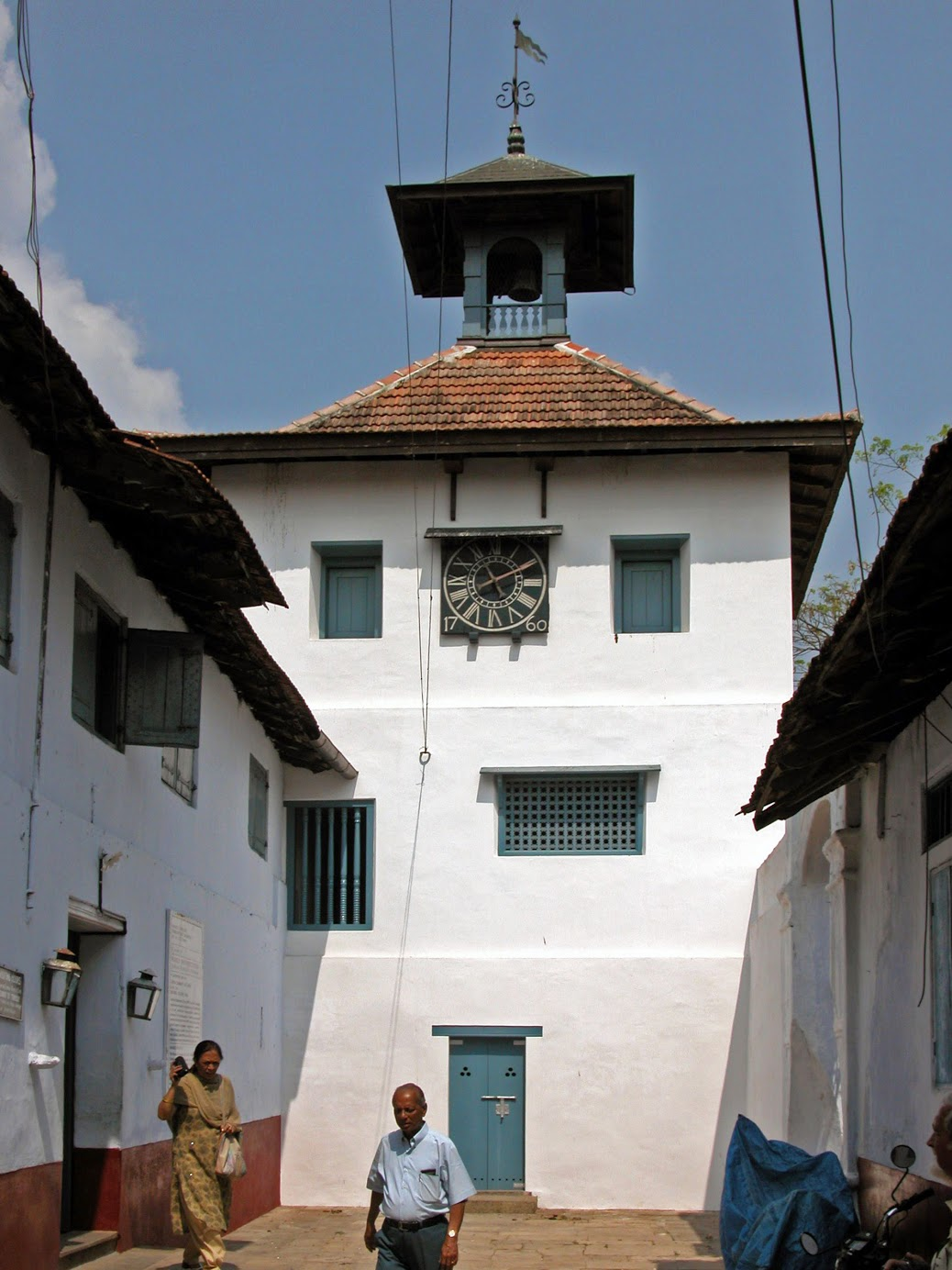
Clock tower of the Paradesi Synagoge (2015)

Since 2013 he has been working in a partnership with the young Indian architect Krishnan Varma.

== Architectural style ==
While in Switzerland, Damschen was inspired by master architect Le Corbusier, whose principles of proportion and scale were adopted into his projects. In his view, architecture that uses the same language universally and neglects reference to its context, leads to an enormous architectural impoverishment in cities. In an interview the architect said:

„While working on the wooden houses and renovating the Jewish Synagogue in Kochi, I realized – like Charles Correa and Geoffrey Bawa – that our so-called modern architecture leads to a visual impoverishment of our cities. To oppose this tendency, architecture must find its roots in a counties culture itself without running the risk of becoming a kind of Disney Land. What I aim at is a kind of timeless architecture which does not pay heed to contemporary trends, as they might not survive."

His buildings are based on the climatic, historical and socio-cultural conditions of the place. He was influenced by its rich culture of India and introduced carefully selected ornamentation into his architecture. All his projects are planned as an architectural unit that includes the interior and landscape design to ensure overall homogeneity:

„Karl Damschen, the German-Swiss architect of the Brunton Boatyard Hotel, treated history and the town’s current appearance as a spur for developing his design along these historical lines. Damschen, who has been commuting between Bern and Cochin with his wife since 1981, has internalised the genius loci, the spirit of the place and found it a very satisfying task to preserve historical stock and to conduct urban repair. He sees his hotel design as a project of this kind, closing a gap in the town's development, and at the same time criticises the unthinking removal of old buildings in favour of new buildings of absolutely no merit. He wanted to express the "value of the old in a new building" (Damschen).“

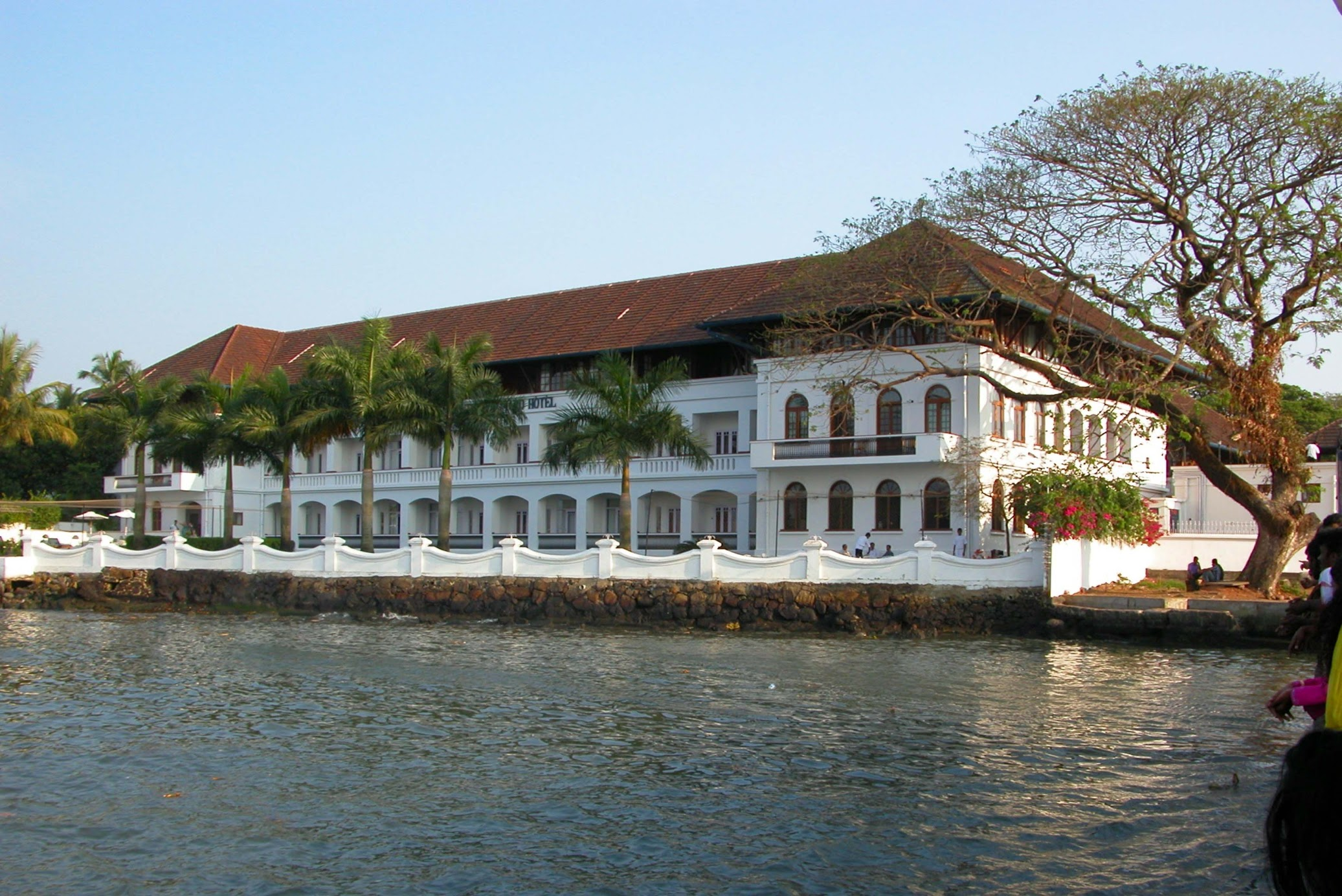
The Brunton Boatyard Hotel

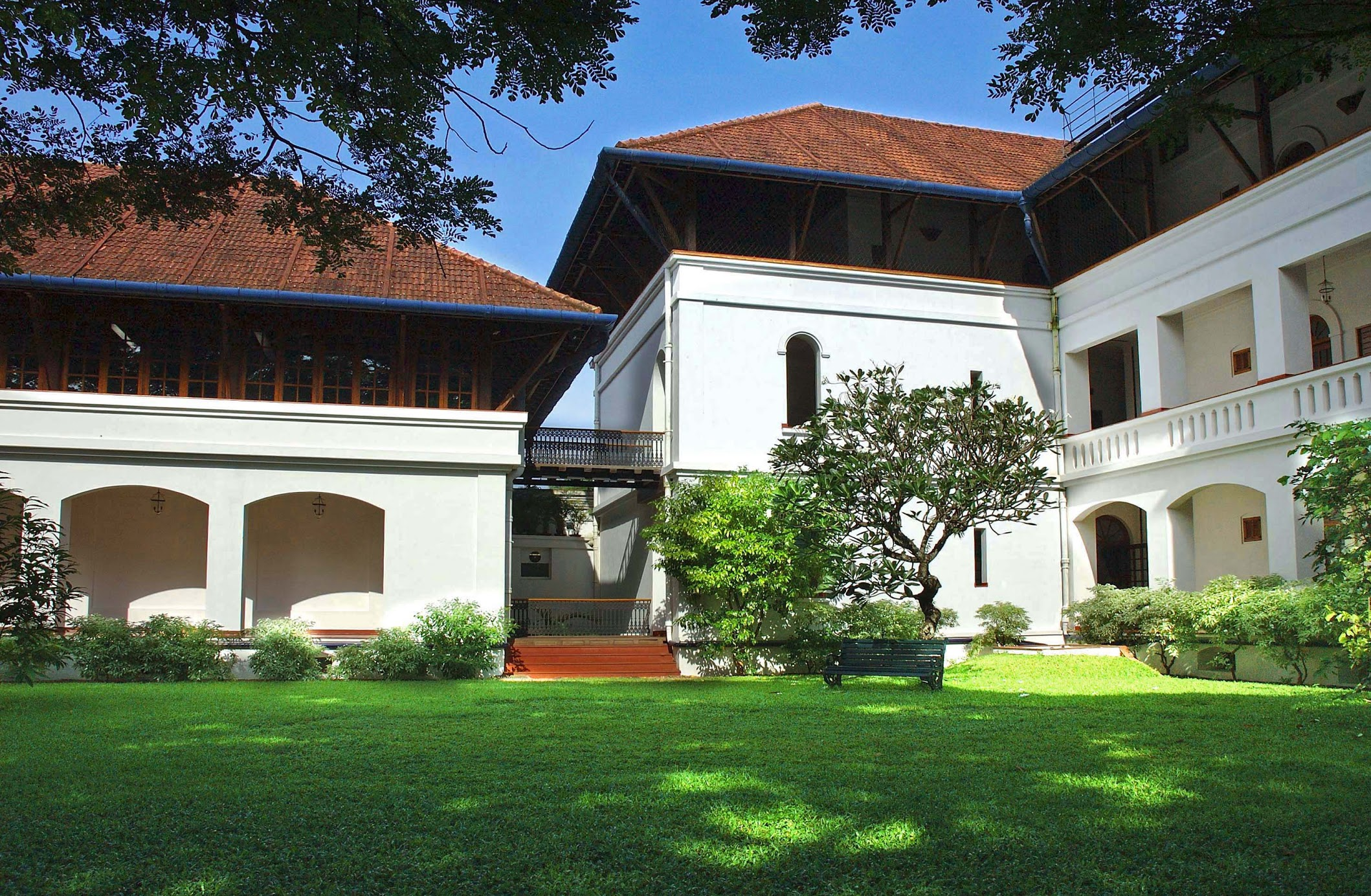
The Brunton Boatyard Hotel

== Selected projects ==
	Building	Location	Notes
1971–1973	Helfer Office Building	Bern, Switzerland	Helfer Architekten AG
1981–1985	Ascom Office Building	Bern, Switzerland	Architektur Atelier Damschen
1985–1996	Hochschule für Technik und Architektur Freiburg	Freiburg, Switzerland	Herren + Damschen, Architects and Planners AG
2005–2006	Indian Forum (Culture Centre)	Schwäbisch Hall, Germany	Architektur Atelier Damschen
1982–2000	Surya Samudra Beach Garden (now Niraamaya Retreats)	Kovalam, Kerala, India	Architektur Atelier Damschen
1996–1999	The Brunton Boatyard(Luxushotel)	Kochi, Kerala, India	In cooperation with A K Prasanth ( Prasanth & associates Architects), Stapati Architects (Tony Joseph)
2002–2004	Taj Garden Retreat	Kumarakom, Kerala, India	Architektur Atelier Damschen
2001–2005	Restoration of the Clock Tower of Paradesi Synagogue for the World Monuments Fund, New York	Jew Town, Kochi, Kerala, India	Architektur Atelier Damschen
2004–2006	Restoration of Old Harbour Hotel (Boutique Hotel)	Kochi, Kerala, India	Architektur Atelier Damschen
2005–2007	Restoration of Visalam Palace (Boutique Hotel)	Kanadukathan, Karaikudy, Tamil Nadu, India	Architektur Atelier Damschen
2006–2009	Ethnic Passage (Boutique Shopping-Mall mit Kunstgalerie und Cafè)	Kochi, Kerala, India	Architektur Atelier Damschen
2006–2010	Dreamz House; Restoration of a residential building	Fort Kochi, Kerala, India	Collaboration with Architect Stephan Mischler
2010–2012	Vismaya House (serviced pool villa)	Cherthala, Kerala, India (at Chenganda on Vembanad Lake)	Architektur Atelier Damschen
2012–2014	Upgrading of the Kashi Art Cafe	Fort Kochi, Kerala, India	Architektur Atelier Damschen
2013–2014	Restoration of Nadulu Hotel – Meriya Heritage (Heritage-Hotel)	Kaipamangalam, near Guruvayoor, Kerala, India	In collaboration with Architect Krishnan Varma
2011–2015	Restoration of the Cochin Club (sport club with swimming pool)	Fort Kochi, Kerala, India	Architektur Atelier Damschen
2013–2024	Olam on the Lake: Restoration of a guest bungalow; New Garden Restaurant	Cheppanam Island, near to Ernakulam, Kerala, India	Architektur Atelier Damschen
2014–2017	Baymaas Lake House (serviced pool villa)	Ernakulam, Kerala India (Cheppanam Island, at Vembanadu Lake)	In collaboration with Architect Krishnan Varma
2019-2024	Gulnaar Villa; Restoration of a Heritage Villa	Dehradhun, Uttarakand, India	Architektur Atelier Damschen
2020-2022	Wilton Weavers; Restoration of the office building, expansion of the workshop hall of a carpet factory	Chertala, Kerala, India	Architektur Atelier Damschen
since 2015	Restoration of The Delta Study School	Fort Kochi, Kerala, India	In collaboration with Architect Krishnan Varma

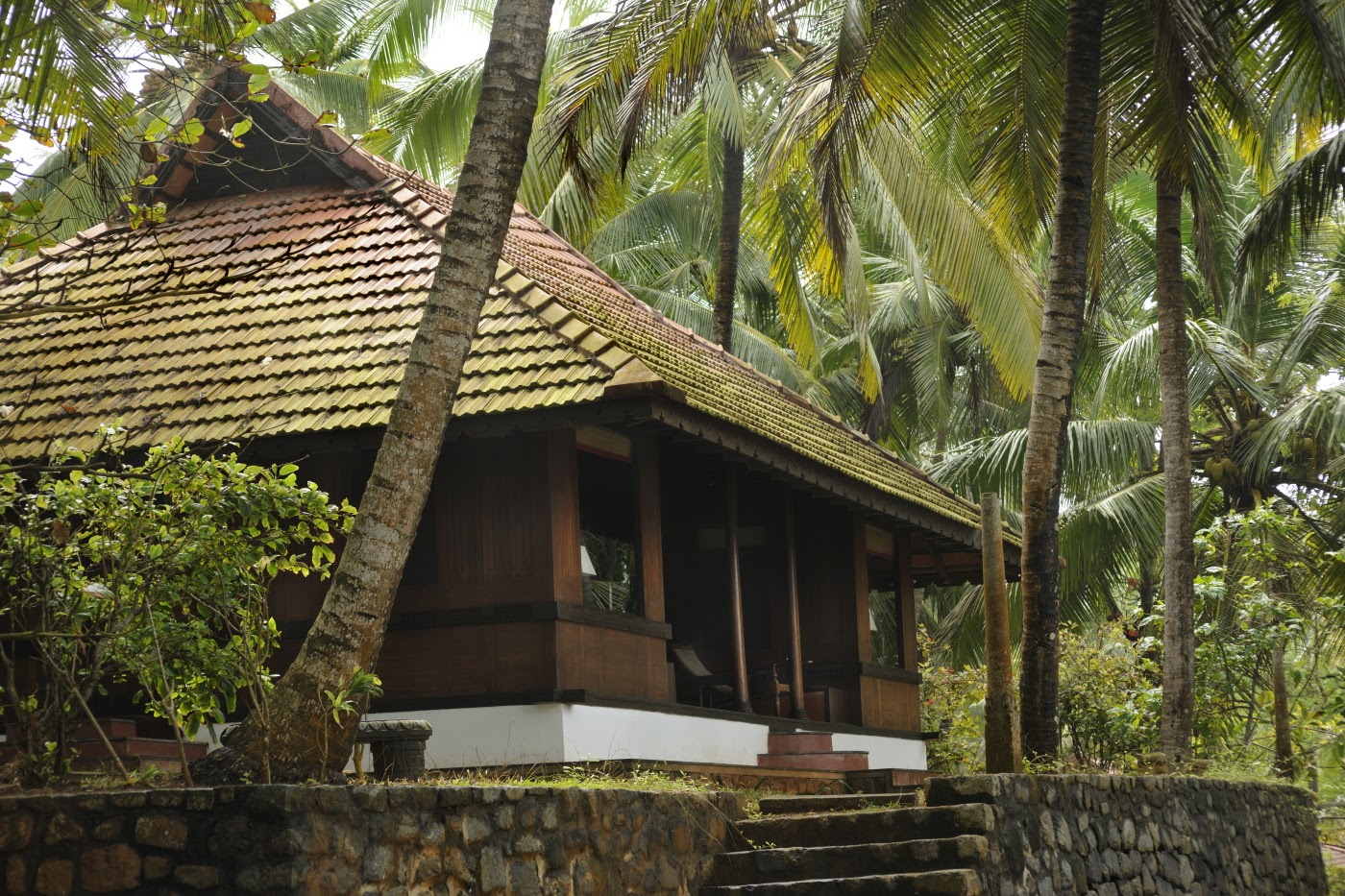
Niraamaya Retreats

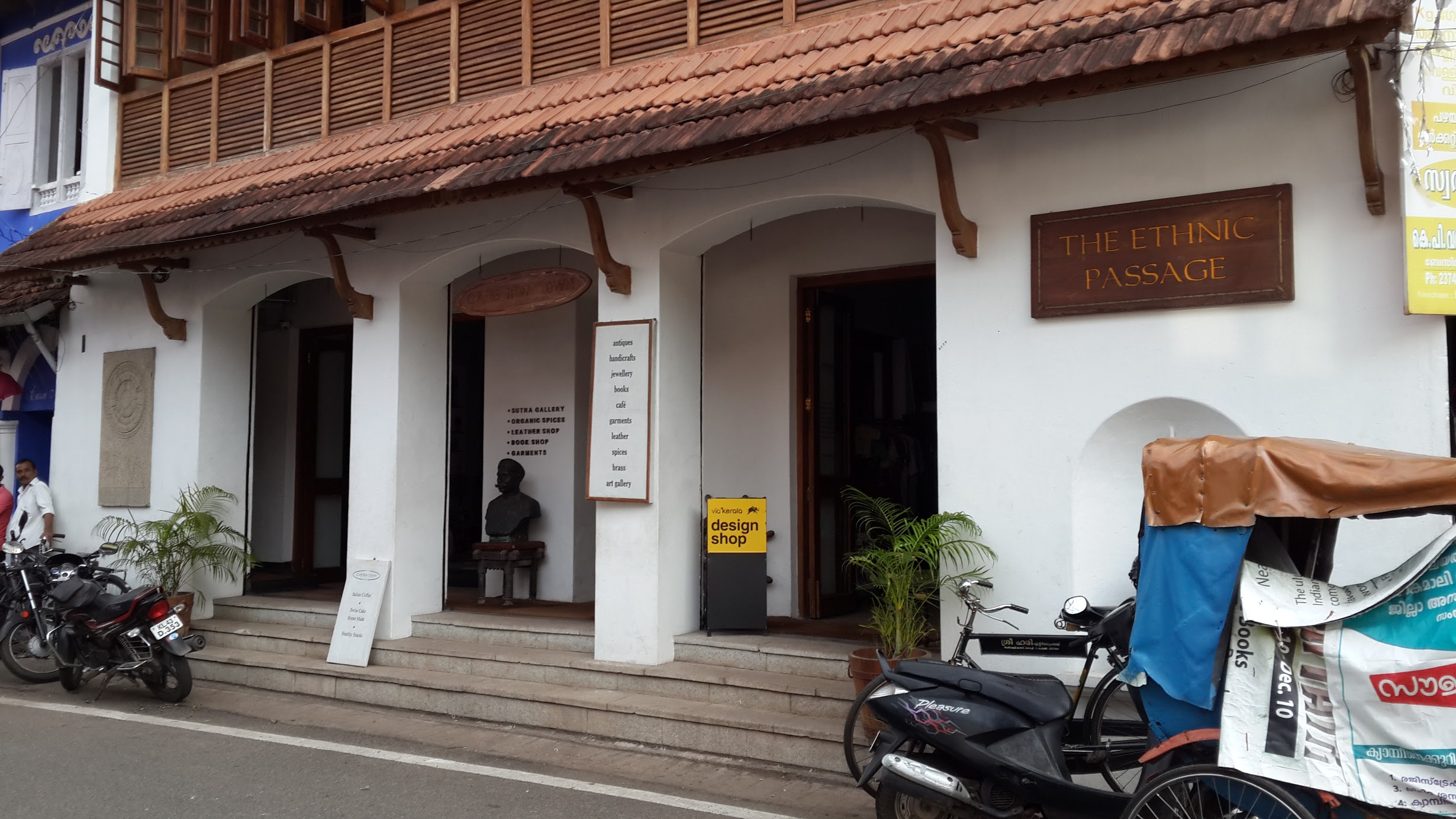
Ethnic Passage in Jew town, Fort Kochi

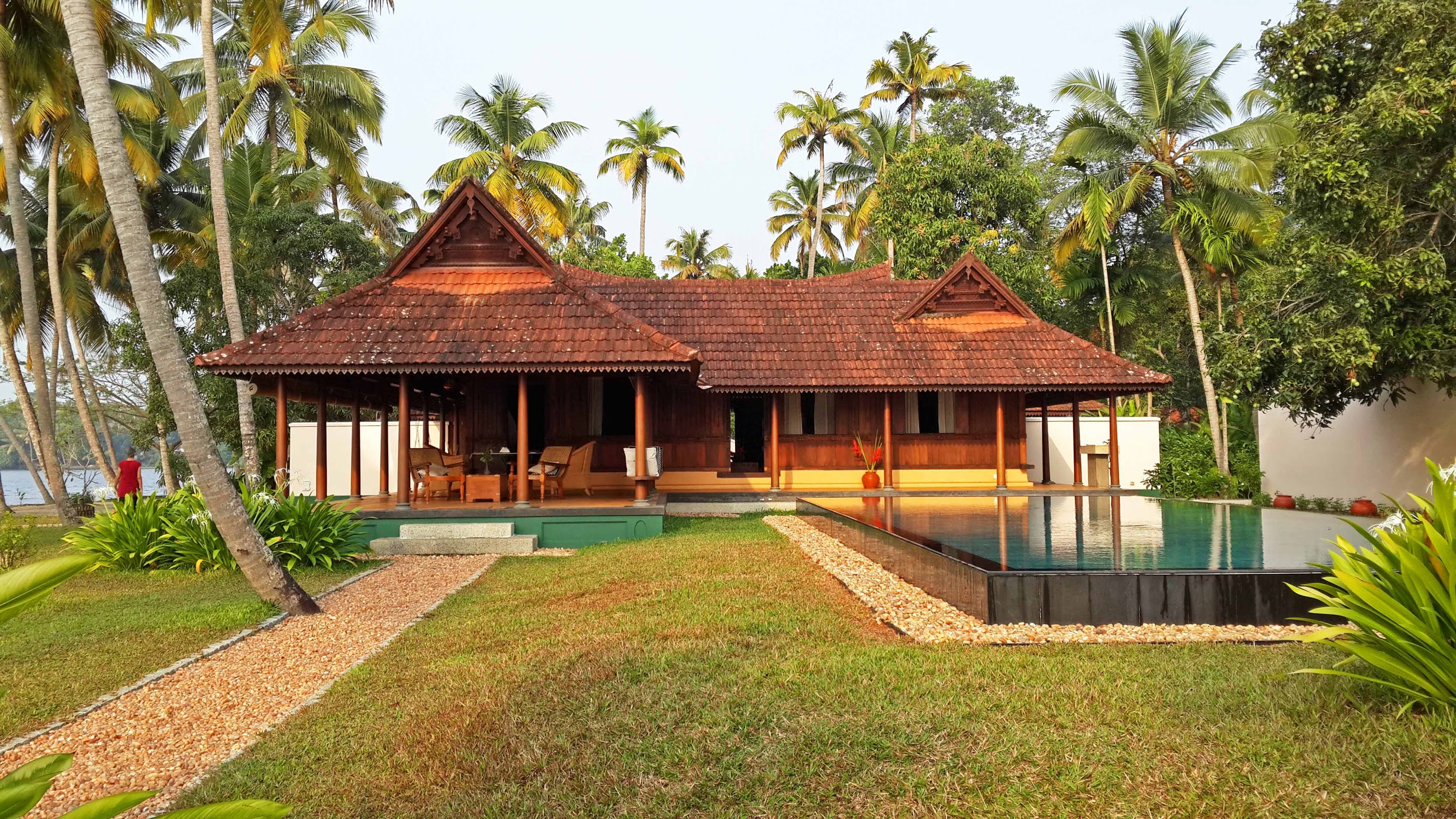
Vismaya Bungalow

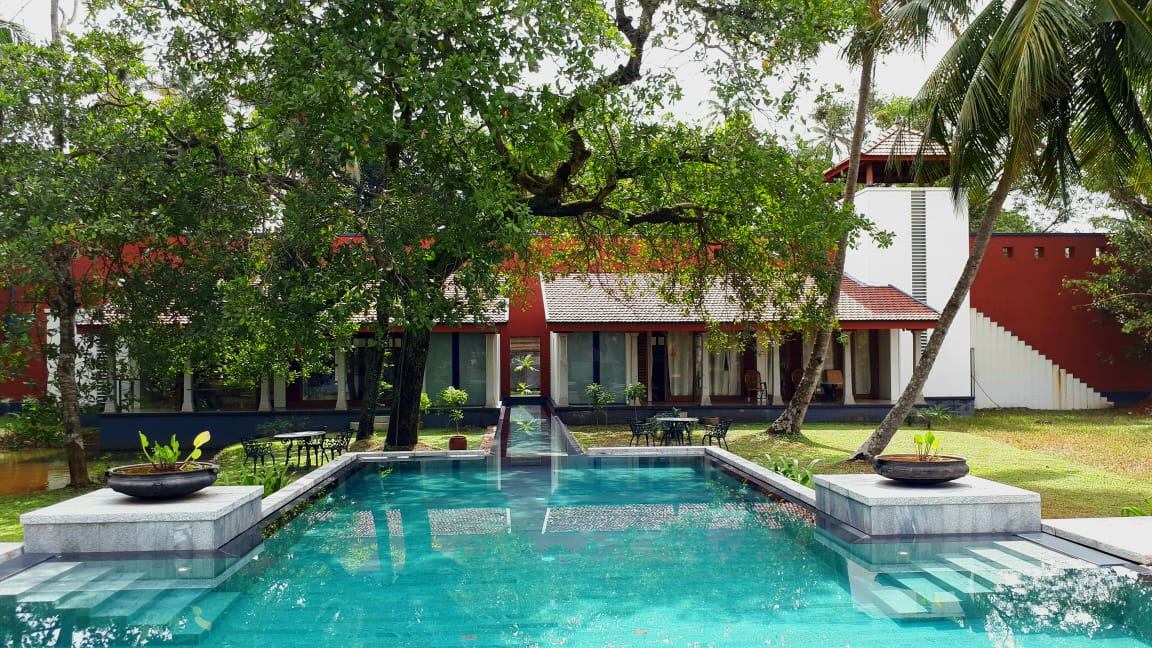
Baymaas Lake House

== Published projects ==
- Herbert Ypma: HIP Hotels Beach. Thames and Hudson (Econ), London 2004, ISBN 3-430-19889-5
- Olaf Krüger and Michael Neumann-Adrian: Zeit für Indien. Bucher-Verlag, Munich 2012, ISBN 3-7658-1288-9
- Olaf Krüger, Michael and Edda Neumann-Adrian: Zeit für Kerala, Traumziele im Garten der Götter. Bucher-Verlag, Munich 2006
- Klaus-Peter Gast: Moderne Traditionen : zeitgenössische Architektur in Indien. Birkhäuser, Basel-Boston-Berlin 2007, ISBN 978-3-7643-7753-3
- Inderjit Badhwar, Susan Leong: India chic hotels. bolding books, Singapore 2006. ISBN 981-4155-57-8
- Kim Inglis: Cool hotels India – Maldives – Sri Lanka, Periplus Editions 2004, ISBN 0-7946-0173-1
