= Kshanam (2021 film) =

- Theatrical release poster
- Directed by: Suresh Unnithan
- Starring: Lal; Bharath; Ajmal Ameer
- Cinematography: Jemin Jom Ayyaneth
- Music by: Gopi Sundar
- Production companies: Deshaan Movie Factory; Roshan Pictures
- Release date: 10 December 2021
- Country: India
- Language: Malayalam

Kshanam is a 2021 Indian Malayalam-language horror-thriller film directed by Suresh Unnithan and produced by Deshaan Movie Factory, along with Roshan Pictures.

The film stars Lal, Bharath, Ajmal Ameer, Baiju, Krrish, Devan, Sneha Ajith, Maala Parvathi and Lekha Prajapathi in lead roles. The screenplay for the film was written by Sreekumar Aroorkutti. The film score was composed by Gopi Sundar. The film was released on 10 December 2021, and received mostly-negative reviews. It was dubbed into Tamil as Ouija.

== Premise ==
Four film school students go location hunting as part of a project. Along the way they meet an odd person who turns out to be an academic in parapsychology. After talking to the man and learning from him, the students begin using a Ouija board and encounter an entity.

== Cast ==
- Lal as Chandrakumar, a professor
- Bharath as Aravind
- Ajmal Ameer as Arun
- Baiju as Ambareesh
- Krrish as Kevin
- Sneha Ajith as Anjalina
- Lekha Prajapati as Gayathri
- Anand Radhakrishnan as Domianos
- Vivek Rajgopal as Irfan
- Anu Sonara
- Devan as Vincent
- Maala Parvathi
- P. Sreekumar
- Lal Jose as Himself (Cameo)
- K. P. Suresh Kumar

== Production ==
The shoot of the film took place in 2019 in places like Kuttikanam and Peermade. The film was completed and ready for release by January 2020, but the release was delayed owing to the pandemic.

== Release ==
The film was released on 10 December 2021. A critic from Malayala Manorama gave the film a negative review. A reviewer from JSNewsTimes wrote "many attempts to intimidate lead to laughter in the theater", and gave the film a negative review. A critic from Samayam also gave the film a negative review, while a critic from Lens Men Review noted "Kshanam is a movie about a group of people who went to a hill station to make a diploma film. And the funny side is that this one looks shoddier than a diploma film."
