= Sowmya Menon =

Indian film actress and model

- Occupations: Actor; dancer; model
- Years active: 2007–2010; 2017–present

Sowmya Menon is an Indian actress who predominantly appears in Malayalam films. She made her movie debut in the 2018 Malayalam film Kinavalli. She played the leading role in the Malayalam movie Children's Park followed by movies like Margamkali and Fancy Dress.

== Filmography ==
=== Movies ===
Year	Film	Role	Language	Notes
2018	Kinavalli	Swathy	Malayalam	
2019	Fancy Dress	Tesa	Malayalam	
2019	Children's Park	Neena	Malayalam	
2019	Margamkali	Urmila	Malayalam	
2019	Neeyum Njanum	Saniya	Malayalam	
2021	Shalamon	Steffy	Malayalam	Post-Production
2021	48 Hours	Celina	Malayalam	Pre-Production
2021	Hunter On Duty	TBA	Kannada	Pre-Production
2021	Taxi	Bhuvika	Telugu	Post-Production
2022	Sarkaru Vaari Paata	Sowmya	Telugu	
2022	Leharaayi	Meghana	Telugu	
2023	Ramachandra Boss & Co	Salomi	Malayalam	

== Music videos ==
Year	Title	Language	Notes
2007	Vannathi	Malayalam	
2020	Vaanil Uyare - Iniyum	Malayalam	
