= Edathirinji =

- village
- Location in Kerala, India Edathirinji (India)
- Coordinates: 10°20′0″N 76°9′0″E
- Country: India
- State: Kerala
- District: Thrissur

Population (2011)
  - Total: 9,849

Languages
  - Official: Malayalam, English
- Time zone: UTC+5:30 (IST)
- PIN: 680122
- Vehicle registration: KL-8, KL-45
- Website: www.edathirinji.com

Edathirinji is a village in Thrissur district in the state of Kerala, India.

Niyamasabha Constituency : Irinjalakuda

Loksabha Constituency : Thrissur

== Demographics ==
As of 2011 India census, Edathirinji had a population of 9,849 with 4,568 males and 5,281 females.

Edathirinji is a fast-growing village in Padiyoor Grama Panchayath. It is located 4 km (2.5 miles) west of Irinjalakuda Municipality in Thrissur district and is connected to both the NH 47 and the NH 17 highways. The government recently labelled the road connected to both highways as a state highway. The main source of living in this village is agriculture.

== Schools ==
- HDPS Higher Secondary School (Thirath)
- St.Mary's Lower Primary School (Kakkazha)
- R I Lower Primary School

== Temples ==
- Sree Sivakumareswara Temple
- Pothani Siva Temple
- Sree Edachali Bhuvaneswari Temple
- Ayyankuzhi Sree Dharma Sastha Temple
- Korath Sree Bhagavathi Temple
- Kavalloor Family Temple
- Annapoornesery Temple, Chettiyal
- Sree Darmadevi Thekkethalakkal Family Temple, Chettiyal
- Anakkathiparambil Vishnumaaya Rudhiramaala Temple
- Thekkoot Valooparambil Bhagavathy Temple
- Ponnampully Sree Subrahmanniya Swami Temple, Marotikal
- Kollamparambil Sree Vishnumaya Temple
- Elinjikottil Sree Bhadrakali Temple
- Kaimaprambil sree bagavthi Temple

=== Church ===
- St Mary's Church Cheloor/Edathirinji

=== Mosques ===
- Edathirinji Juma Masjid
- Edathirinji Centre Juma Mazjid
