= Krrish S. Kumar =

Indian actor (born 1989)

- Born: 18 June 1989 (age 36); Chennai, Tamil Nadu
- Occupations: Actor, Writer, Designer, Model, Associate Director
- Years active: 2012–present
- Height: 174 cm (5 ft 9 in)

Krrish is an Indian actor who predominantly appears in Tamil and Malayalam cinema.

== Career ==
He starts his career as an assistant director to Gautham Vasudev Menon. He made his acting debut in the movie Yennai Arindhaal, directed by Gautham Menon and later played the antagonist in the bilingual Achcham Enbadhu Madamaiyada. He was seen next in Santhosh Nair's upcoming bilingual film Rangeela as the leading hero along with Sunny Leone. He made his Malayalam debut with Kinavalli directed by Sugeeth in 2018 for which he won the Asiavision Awards for most promising actor. He worked on movies like Suresh Unnithan's Kshanam and Srinath Rajendran's Kurup starring Dulquer Salmaan and Indrajith Sukumaran. His latest release is the web series What's up Velakkari, which has released in Zee 5 in December 2018. He plays a cop called Rakesh. His latest Tamil film is Hostel directed by Sumanth Radhakrishnan.

== Awards ==
Year	Award	Category	Film	Result
2018	Asiavision Awards	Most Promising Actor	Kinavalli	Won

== Filmography ==
Year	Film	Role	Language	Notes
2015	Yennai Arindhaal	Krish	Tamil	
2016	Impatient	Vishvanath	Tamil	Short film
2017	Achcham Enbadhu Madamaiyada	Atul	Tamil	Bilingual film
2017	Sahasam Swasaga Sagipo	Atul	Telugu	Bilingual film
2017	Leena	Martin	English	Short film
2018	Kinavalli	Ajith	Malayalam	
2018	What's up Velakkari	Rakesh a.k.a. Rocky	Tamil	TV series on Zee5
2018	What's up Panimanushi	Rakesh a.k.a. Rocky	Telugu	TV series on Zee5
2019	Swasam	Akash	Tamil	Short film
2020	Menaka	Superstar Gagan	Malayalam	TV series on Manorama Max
2020	Paava Kadhaigal	Dhanasekhar	Tamil	Netflix anthology film
2021	Kshanam	Kevin	Malayalam	
2021	Kurup	SI Johny	Malayalam	
2022	Hostel	Joshua	Tamil	
2022	Watch		Tamil	
