= Dushtaa =

2011 Kannada-language film

- Directed by: S. Narayan
- Written by: S. Narayan
- Produced by: S. Narayan
- Starring: Pankaj Narayan; Surabhi Santosh
- Cinematography: Jagadish Wali
- Music by: S. Narayan
- Release date: 3 June 2011
- Country: India
- Language: Kannada

Dushtaa is a 2011 Indian Kannada language action thriller film directed by S Narayan starring his son, Pankaj Narayan and Surabhi Santosh in the lead roles.

== Cast ==
- Pankaj Narayan as Isha
- Surabhi Santosh as Pathi

== Production ==
The supporting cast of the film comprises 21 newcomers who were cast after holding auditions throughout Karnataka. The film was shot around Shimoga and Bhadravati districts of Karnataka. It was an attempt at realistic cinema and was based on a real life story which the director witnessed in his formative years in Bhadravati.

== Soundtrack ==
Soundtrack was composed by S. Narayan.

1. "Eesa Oh Eesa" - Rakesh, Kusala
2. "Premaa Premaa" - AR Anantha Krishna
3. "Sneha" - Anoop, Vijay, Banni Mohan, Harsha
4. "Haalu Hrudayakke" - Sadashiva Shenoy
5. "Nan Hendru" - Harsha Remuna
6. "Jhinke Oh Jhinke" - Nakul, Akshara Hari

== Release and reception ==
The film was released on 3 June 2011.

Bharathstudent.com predicted that the film would "find select audience and above average returns" at the box office while reviewing that Dushtaa was a "rustic tale of love, misfortune and stroke of destiny." and "Though the idea is realistic, it doesn't leave the audience with a pleasant feel as the protagonist keeps suffering right from the start. While the first half goes about with the layering of the plot, the second half gets into various twists and turns"
