= Fancy Dress (2019 film) =

- Directed by: Ranjith Saccariya
- Written by: Ranjith Saccariya; Ajay Kumar
- Story by: Guinnes Pakru
- Produced by: Guinnes Pakru
- Starring: Guinnes Pakru; Swetha Menon; Kalabhavan Shajon; Sowmya Menon
- Cinematography: Pradeep Nair
- Edited by: V Sajan
- Music by: Ratheesh Vega
- Production company: Sarva Deeptha Productions
- Release date: 2 August 2019
- Running time: 124 minutes
- Country: India
- Language: Malayalam

Fancy Dress is a 2019 Indian Malayalam Language comedy film directed by Ranjith Saccariya and produced by Guinness Pakru. The film starring Guinness Pakru, Swetha Menon and Kalabhavan Shajon was released on 2 August 2019. The film had musical score composed by Ratheesh Vega.

== Cast ==
- Guinness Pakru as Dikru/Ben
- Hareesh Kanaran as Sebastian/Seban
- Swetha Menon as Priya
- Bala Kumar as Gabriel A Goa Based Drug Lord
- Kalabhavan Shajon as Nandhan Police Officer
- Sowmya Menon as Tessa
- Jayan Cherthala as Devarajan Police Officer
- Bijukuttan as Lalu Security guard
- Sudheer Karamana as Sreedharan
- Santhosh Keezhattoor as Martyn Police Officer
- Saju Navodaya as Jomon
- Ponnamma Babu as Cicily
- Kottayam Pradeep as Prabha Varma
- Majeed as Anandan
- Gemini Kottayam as Abraham
- Joy as Gokul
- Thesni Khan as Parvathy
- Kathir as Jobin
- Suraj Venjaramoodu (Cameo Appearance)
- Sarayu Mohan (Cameo Appearance)

== Soundtrack ==
- Ullilie Moham Kunnolam by Niranj Suresh
- Aattam Maarattam by Vijay Yesudas

== Marketing and release ==
The official teaser was launched on 4 July 2019 and the film was released on 2 August 2019.

== Reception ==
Anna Mathews of Times of India noted slow pacing in parts of the film and described the comedic elements as "thin".
