= The Journey (2004 film) =

The Journey (Sancharram)
- North American DVD cover
- Original title: Sancharram
- Directed by: Ligy J. Pullappally
- Screenplay by: Ligy J. Pullappally
- Produced by: Ligy J. Pullappally
- Starring: Shruthy Menon; Suhasini V. Nair; K. P. A. C. Lalitha; Valsala Menon
- Cinematography: M.J. Radhakrishnan
- Edited by: B. Ajithkumar
- Music by: Isaac Thomas Kottukapally
- Distributed by: Wolfe Video
- Release date: 2004
- Running time: 107 minutes
- Country: India
- Language: Malayalam

The Journey (Sancharram) is a 2004 Malayalam language feature film written, directed and produced by Ligy J. Pullappally, inspired both by her short film Uli and a true story of two lesbian lovers in the South Indian state of Kerala.

== Plot ==
The film follows two young friends, Kiran, a Hindu, and Delilah, a Catholic, from their first meeting as young children to young adulthood, when they realize their love for each other.

A student in their same class, Rajan, has a crush on Delilah and he asks Kiran to pen love letters to her on his behalf. Kiran does so as it allows her to express her love to Delilah without having to be ostracized by her family and society. Eventually Delilah discovers the truth behind the letters and poetry, and admits her mutual love to Kiran. This begins a delicate love affair, despite social taboos against homosexuality.

Their love affair is severely impeded when Rajan discovers Kiran and Delilah stealing a moment of intimacy in the woods. He informs Delilah's mother of what he witnessed. Delilah's Mom confronts her, who reveals her love for Kiran. To save the family from disgrace, she arranges a marriage for Delilah with a suitor who had recently visited with intent to find a bride. Delilah reluctantly consents to the marriage. Kiran tries to convince Delilah to run away with her after gaining support from her uncle who lives in a distant place, but Delilah tells Kiran that it's not possible and that what had existed between them has ended.

While Delilah's wedding proceeds as planned, a heartbroken Kiran walks to a cliff overlooking a waterfall, where she and Delilah had once gone together. At the same time, Delilah is about to take her marriage vows, but stops. She runs out of the church and yells Kiran's name. Kiran looks behind her but doesn't see anyone. She reaches for a cocoon on a branch and slips on the edge, but is able to stop the fall and pull herself up. As she lies on her back, Kiran sees a blue butterfly flying above her. Delilah looks up to the sky and sees it too.

== Cast ==
- Shruthy Menon as Delilah
- Suhasini V. Nair as Kiran
- K. P. A. C. Lalitha as Amma, Delilah's mother
- Valsala Menon as Ammachi, Delilah's grandmother
- Syam Seethal as Rajan
- Suresh Babu - as Narayanan Kurup, Kiran's father
- Ambika Mohan as Priya Kurup, Kiran's mother
- Venu Machat - as Ezhithachan
- Sangeeta - as the Teacher

== Critical reception ==
Autostraddle listed the movie as being among the 102 best lesbian films of all time.

== Comparisons to Fire ==
Sancharram has been compared to Deepa Mehta's 1996 film Fire, a movie which also touches upon lesbian relationships in India. However, where Fire is explicit in stating that the main characters enter their relationship due to the failure of their heterosexual marriages, Sancharram is clearly a film about two lesbians who fall in love with each other.

== See also ==
- Ek Ladki Ko Dekha Toh Aisa Laga (2019)
- List of LGBT-related films directed by women
- Homosexuality in India
