= Neeyum Njanum =

2019 film by A.K. Sajan

- Directed by: A. K. Sajan
- Written by: A. K. Sajan
- Produced by: Siyad Koker
- Starring: Sharaf U Dheen; Anu Sithara; Siju Wilson
- Narrated by: Mohanlal
- Cinematography: Clinto Antony
- Edited by: A. R. Akhil
- Music by: Vinu Thomas
- Production companies: Kokers Films; Lamp Movies
- Distributed by: Kokers Films
- Release date: 18 January 2019 (Kerala)
- Running time: 161 minutes
- Country: India
- Language: Malayalam

Neeyum Njanum (transl. You and me) is a 2019 Indian Malayalam-language romance film written and directed by A. K. Sajan. It stars Sharaf U Dheen, Anu Sithara and Siju Wilson. The film was produced by Siyad Koker under the banner of Kokers Films, in association with Lamp Movies. Neeyum Njanum was released in Kerala on 18 January 2019 by Kokers Films. It also features Aju Varghese, Vishnu Unnikrishnan, Dileesh Pothan, Aji John(director), Shaheen Siddique, Surabhi Lakshmi and Sowmya Menon in prominent roles.

== Cast ==
- Sharaf U Dheen as Yakub Mohammed, Hashmi's husband
- Anu Sithara as Hashmi Anzari, Yakub's wife and Shanu's love interest
- Siju Wilson as Shanu Khalid, Hashmi's love interest
- Aju Varghese as Abbas
- Vishnu Unnikrishnan as Ganapathi
- Aji John(director) as Soofi
- Poojitha Menon as Chithra Prasad
- Shaheen Siddique as Noushad
- Surabhi Lakshmi as Subhadrakutty
- Srikant Murali as Nampiri Mash
- Shyam Jacob as Hyder
- Sohan Seenulal as Const.Joseph
- Sowmya Menon as Saniya
- Dileesh Pothan as S.I Kanan
- Sijoy Varghese
- Kalabhavan Haneef
- Sadiq
- Manuraj as Manuji
- Shobi Thilakan
- Santhakumari as Taj Itha
- Dini Daniel
- Veena Nair as Sreya
- Mohanlal (narration)

== Release ==
Neeyum Njanum was released in Kerala on 18 January 2019 by Kokers Films.

=== Critical reception ===
The Times of India rated 3.5 out of 5 stars and wrote: "Neeyum Njanum is a narrative of our time, touching on themes of moral policing, religion, and politics. He [A. K. Sajan] uses sharp wit and wry sarcasm as his story telling tools, making it a somewhat intelligent cinema".

== Soundtrack ==
The songs were composed by Vinu Thomas and the lyrics were written by B. K. Harinarayanan and Salaudheen Kechery.

- 1 "Kunkumanira" - Shreya Ghoshal
- 2 "Aalam" - Mridula Warrier
- 3 "Ishq Kondu" - Najim Arshad, Abhirami Ajay
- 4 "En Roohin" - Amal Antony
- 5 "Thedunna Theeram" - Amal Antony
- 6 "Koottilay" - Abhirami Ajay
- 7 "Alam" (M)- Arun Alat
