= Kinavalli =

- Kinavalli
- Directed by: Sugeeth
- Written by: Syam Seethal; Vishnu Ramachandran
- Based on: Pee Mak by Banjong Pisanthanakun
- Produced by: Manesh Thomas
- Starring: Ajmal Zayn; Surabhi Santosh; Krrish Menon; Sowmya Menon; Vijay Johnny; Sujith Raj Kochukunju
- Cinematography: Vivek Menon
- Edited by: Naveen P. Vijayan
- Music by: Shashwath Sunil Kumar
- Production company: Kannamthanam films
- Distributed by: Vaishaka Cynyma
- Release date: 27 July 2018
- Country: India
- Language: Malayalam

Kinavalli (English: Dream Vine) is a 2018 Indian Malayalam-language fantasy horror film directed by Sugeeth, written by Syam Seethal and Vishnu Ramachandran and produced by Manesh Thomas under the banner Kannamthanam films. It is a remake of the Thai horror-comedy movie Pee Mak (2013), like the Tamil film Bayama Irukku (2017).

== Plot ==
Ann decides to surprise her husband Vivek for their wedding anniversary by inviting his close friends Sudheesh, Ajith, Gopan, and Swathi to the couple's home. Vivek, an orphan, and these four friends were children in the same school and became best friends. The friends, working in different places, arrive to surprise him.

Ajith is fond of photography; he takes snapshots of Vivek's reaction to seeing his friends, but later his camera doesn't function. Also, mirrors don't last in the house. Vivek narrates to them the story of the foreign couple who resided in the bungalow a long time ago, and it is believed by the natives that the house is haunted by their spirits. Vivek later asks his friends not to be worried about Ann if she behaves strangely, as she is mentally upset about her miscarriage. Slowly the friends experience strange activities in the house. Gopan and Sudheesh mistake that Swathi is possessed and decide to get holy water from the church. Meanwhile, Swathi decorates the hall and slips from the stool while decorating the wall.

A cupboard with sharp articles almost falls over her but is held back by force. Swathi turns around to find Ann holding back the cupboard and the knives with her powers. Swathi gets scared and runs out. Sudheesh and Gopan arrive and splash the holy water on her. Swathi reveals to them that she is not possessed; it is Ann who is possessed. They sprinkle the water on the knife Ann would touch to cut their Anniversary cake. Ann feels shocked as soon as she touches the knife, thus revealing to Sudheesh, Gopan, and Swathi that she is truly possessed.

Ann warns the three not to speak to Vivek about this and to leave the next day. The three inform Ajith about Ann, but he doesn't believe them. Later, when Ajith gets his camera back from the repair shop, he sees that Ann is not captured in any of the pictures where she was present. He then confirms it by clicking a few pictures of Ann wherein only a shadow is seen in her place. Ajith tries to inform Vivek about Ann, but she somehow manages to divert him from his friends. When the friends gave up attempts to convince Vivek and decided to leave, Ann commands them not to, knowing they would bring some holy person to chase her out. When Sudheesh tries to leave the house, he is beaten and threatened by Ann. Sudheesh's uncle, who claims to be a Brahmin who could chase ghosts, enters the house at Sudheesh's request. Ann threatens him too. Later Ajith manages to show the camera pictures to Vivek, but the pictures no longer exist. They then perform a drama to take Vivek out of the house. Sudheesh acts like having stomach pain, and all of them rush him to the car, Vivek forgets his purse and the friends ask Ann to go and bring it. The friends previously splashed holy water in a few places in the house, and Ajith goes back to the house, locks Ann, and drizzles the holy water on the door. The friends immediately leave with Vivek. Halfway through, they remember that they left Sudheesh's uncle in the house, who opens the door of the room where Ann is locked.

The atmosphere seems to change, and the friends understand that Ann is out. The friends rush Vivek into a church and reveal to him about Ann. Vivek is confused and doesn't believe his friends. Ajith pushes Vivek near a sharp object, knowing that Ann will appear to save him. Ann saves him, and Vivek gets to see the real ghostly face of Ann. But instead of getting scared, Vivek reveals to everyone that he already knew everything about Ann. When Ann went into labour, Vivek could not get help as the phone was not working. He rushed Ann to the hospital on his bike, and they met with an accident, hitting a huge boulder. Vivek fell to the ground, but Ann fell off the cliff into the river below. Vivek tried to help Ann, but he lost consciousness.

When Vivek opened his eyes at the hospital, he saw Ann and was happy that she was safe. However, in a few days, he understood that Ann had died and that it was her spirit that was with him after he didn't see the image of Ann in the mirror. However, he chose to stay with her. Also, he avoided his friends and others for these many years, to protect this secret. But Ann, planning to give Vivek a surprise, invited his friends to their home without his knowledge and the secret came out.

On hearing the truth, Ann decides to leave Vivek and go, but Vivek convinces Ann to live the way they have been living.

After a year, the friends again meet, this time with the addition of Sudheesh's wife. Sudheesh's wife is at first frightened to get out of the car. Ann then goes and brings her into the house with care. All of them get along well and click a picture. Then goes a voice-over of Ann saying that she knows she would never appear in the picture, but the picture would be close to her heart.

== Cast ==
- Ajmal Zayn as Vivek
- Surabhi Santosh as Ann
- Vijay Johny as Sudheesh
- Krrish Menon as Ajith
- Sujith Raj Kochukunju as Gopan
- Sowmya Menon as Swathy
- Hareesh Kanaran as Appu Shanti
- Pauly Valsan

== Production ==
The film has a mix of genres in which drama, comedy and horror are the highlights. In an interview, regarding the film, Syam said, "The film is about friendship, love, fantasy and also has a little bit of horror thrown in. Sugeeth has been particular that since his first film, the title or the tagline be related to the story and the tagline of this film - ‘based on a fake story’ - too has relevance with the film".

Unlike his previous films, it will be the first time the director Sugeeth is working on a film with no established artists. The film introduces six new artists to the film industry. Vivek Menon and Shashwath Sunil Kumar, are performing the cinematography and music direction respectively. On being asked why he chose to work with newcomers, Sugeeth was quoted as saying "A film is not only about the profits that can be made. It is also about giving opportunities to newcomers when everything falls into place, which happened in my case. The story of Kinavalli took shape when a large group of us were sitting together and swapping tales. And this story called for fresh faces, which too fell into place."

The first look poster was launched on Valentine's Day 2018 on a Dubai Radio Channel, Hit 96.7 FM by actor/RJ Nyla Usha.

== Release ==
The film was released on 27 July 2018 with positive reviews.

The Times of India gave it a 3.5 out of 5 and, in its review, praised the performances of the newcomers "The youngsters charge the frames with their electric performance, seamlessly switching back and forth from comedy to sober seriousness" and also goes on to say, "Kinavalli is a horror-fantasy tailor-made for the family audience. It doesn't depend on an excess of graphics or loud thuds or crashes to create the spooks. Neither does it creep on you to scare you out of your wits. Instead it comes with some clean comedy, subtle scares and a hard sell of a climax. But then again, when the makers term the movie to be “based on a fake story”, you mustn’t really apply logic because they've already asked you not to."

The Deccan Chronicle mentioned "All credits to Sugeeth for breaking out of his comfort zone and not hanging on to his usual cast. He has shown the courage to bank on the untried fantasy-horror genre, with a string of newcomers, who have done their best to make the movie engaging. Sugeeth has proved that he is capable of pulling off other genres well too. The script written by Sheethal Shyam and Vishnu Ramachandran has an adequate mix of comedy and uncanny moments. Vivek Menon's cinematography blends well with the mood of the movie." while giving it a 3.5 on 5.

Manorama Online summarised Kinavalli as "a complete entertainer with twists", while Sify, termed it as "a paisa vasool entertainer" stating that "Kinavalli may not offer you too many surprises or scare the hell out of the viewer. But the movie does manage to entertain you with its own share of thrills."
