= Children's Park (film) =

- Theatrical release poster
- Directed by: Shafi
- Written by: Rafi
- Produced by: Roopesh Omana; Milan Jaleel
- Starring: Vishnu Unnikrishnan; Manasa Radhakrishnan; Dhruvan; Gayathri Suresh; Sharafudheen; Sowmya Menon
- Cinematography: Faizal Ali
- Edited by: V. Saajan
- Music by: Arun Raj
- Distributed by: Cochin Films
- Release date: 5 June 2019
- Country: India
- Language: Malayalam

Children's Park is a 2019 Indian Malayalam comedy film. It was directed by Shafi and written by Rafi. The film stars Vishnu Unnikrishnan, Sharaf U Dheen, Dhruvan, Manasa Radhakrishnan, Gayathri Suresh and Sowmya Menon. It was produced by Roopesh Omana and Milan Jaleel under Cochin Films.

== Plot ==
Rishi and Jerry are good friends who trust each other immensely and decide to run away from their respective homes. Eventually, Rishi's father dies, and the desire to inherit his father's wealth starts to develop in his mind. Unfortunately, Rishi does not get any of the wealth, as his father signs everything away to an orphanage named "Children's Park." An older man, Govindan, owned the orphanage. Rishi, longing for his father's wealth, decides to travel towards the orphanage with his best friend, Jerry. To their surprise, they discover that the orphanage is non-functional. To get the money, the orphanage has to be functioning well, so they contact Lenin, a political party worker, and befriend him. The three of them together rescue kidnapped children on the road by disguising themselves as the police. As the three friends don't have any money to buy things for the orphans, they plot to cheat and win money from a political leader named Kora. One night, Viji, a maiden, comes and leaves her baby in front of the orphanage's gate only to discover that the next evening she would have to go back to the orphanage to work as a nanny. As time passes, the events start to heat up among the characters, and the story becomes entertaining, tragic, and comedic.

== Cast ==
- Vishnu Unnikrishnan as Jerry Thomas
- Dhruvan as Rishi
- Sharaf U Dheen as Lenin Adimali
- Manasa Radhakrishnan as Prarthana
- Gayathri Suresh as Viji
- Sowmya Menon as Neena
- Aruldoss as Murugan
- Joy Mathew as Govindan Kurup
- Hareesh Kanaran as Dinakaran
- Rafi as Adv. Thomas Augustine, Jerry's father
- Balachandran Chullikkadu as Rishi's Father
- Kollam Sudhi as Binu Adimali
- Shivaji Guruvayoor as Korah, Neena's father
- Dini Daniel as Jerry's mother
- Ponnamma Babu as Neena's mother and Korah's wife
- Sreejith Ravi as S.P Alex IPS
- Noby Marcose
- Shafiq Rahman as Mariyappan
- Basil

== Sources ==
- "Children's Park Movie Review". The Times of India. 5 June 2019.
