= Cheloor =

- village
- Interactive map of Cheloor
- Coordinates: 10°20′22.96″N 76°11′43.97″E
- Country: India
- State: Kerala
- District: Thrissur

Languages
  - Official: Malayalam, English
- Time zone: UTC+5:30 (IST)
- PIN: 680121
- Telephone code: 0480
- Vehicle registration: KL-45
- Nearest city: Thrissur
- Lok Sabha constituency: Thrissur
- Vidhan Sabha constituency: Irinjalakuda
- Municipality ward: Cheloor, Ward No.21
- Councillor: K.S.Prasad, LDF, (2025 -)

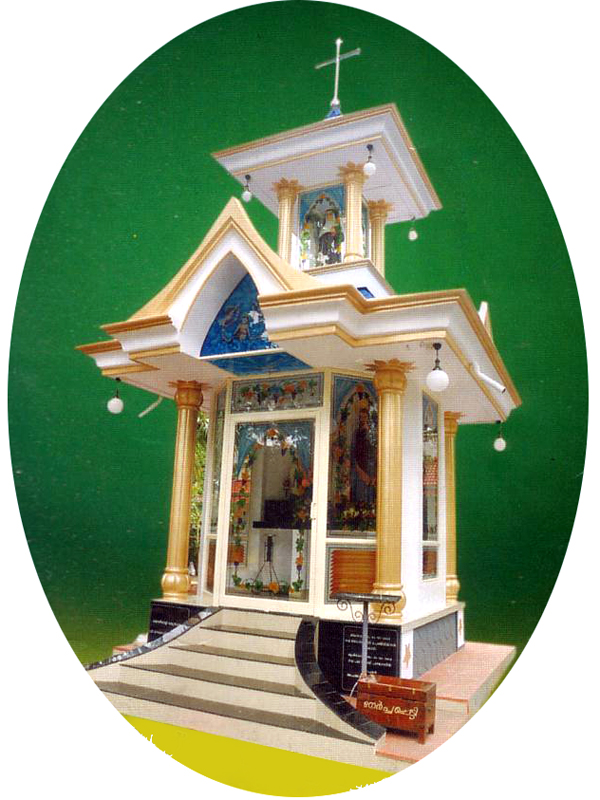
Chapel Americankettu

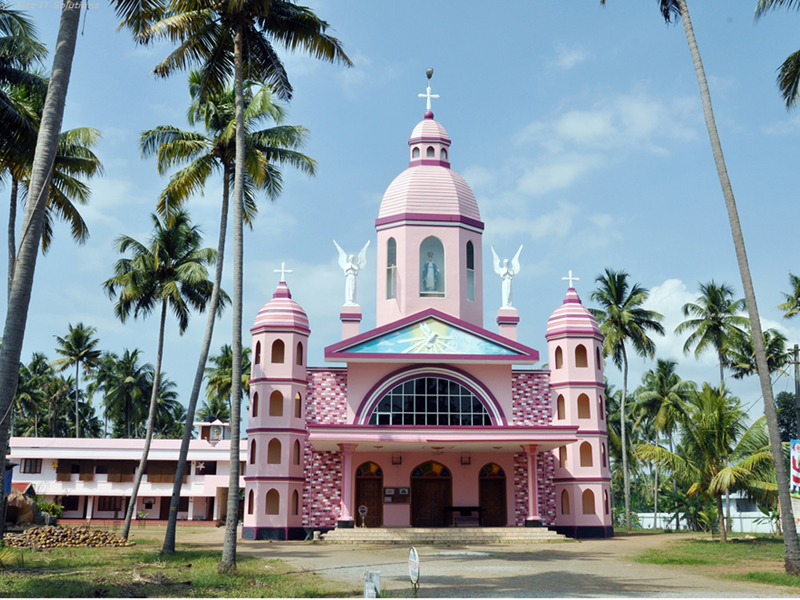
Cheloor Church

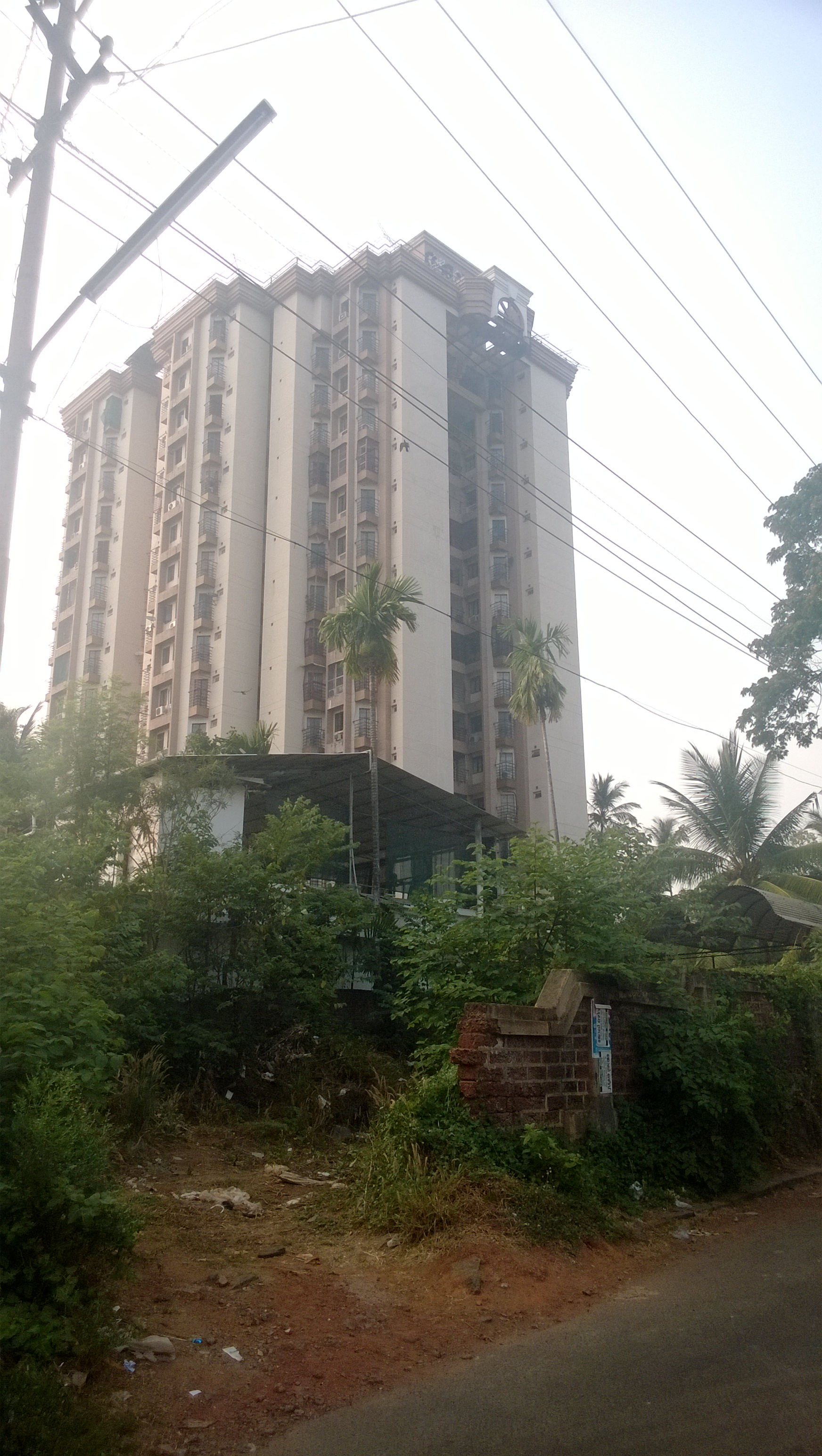
Cheloor Heights

Cheloor is a place in Irinjalakuda municipality, Thrissur district in the Indian state of Kerala. It is around 1 km from the famous Koodalmanikyam Temple.

== Location ==
Cheloor is bordered by Edakulam on the south, Edathirinji on the west, Kanteshwaram on the north and Irinjalakuda town on the east.

Irinjalakuda and Moonupeedika are the nearest towns.

== Transportation ==
Irinjalakuda Municipal Bus Stand and Irinjalakuda KSRTC Bus Stand are the nearest bus stands. Irinjalakuda Railway Station at Kalletumkara is the nearest railway station.

== Places of worship ==
- Cheloor Kavu
- St. Mary's Church
- Mariyaman Kovil
- Vettathu Ambalam
- Panokkil Ambalam
- Thamarath Sreerama Temple

== Bank branches & ATMs ==
- South Indian bank, Do.No.387/1, Irinjalakuda-kakkathuruthy Road, P.o, Irinjalakuda, Kerala 680121
- Federal Bank ATM, KSRTC Bus Stand
- ICICI Bank ATM, KSE Vesta Dosa World

== Petrol Pump ==
- Hindustan Petroleum HP Petrol Pump - Nakkara Fuels

== Local Body Elections 2025 December ==
Current Councilor - K.S.Prasad, Kottadayil House, Irinjalakda, Mobile - 9745333997

Election result
Party	Code	Candidate	Votes
CPI	1	Prasad.K.S	291
INC	3	K.M.Santhosh	255
BJP	2	K.G.Vinod	245

Previous councilor - Soniya Giri, INC (2020 - 2025)
