= Moonupeedika =

- Town in India
- Interactive map of Moonupeedika
- Coordinates: 10.321126°N 76.144416°E
- Elevation: 5.5 m (18 ft)
- Website: moonnupeedika.com

Moonupeedika is a town in Thrissur District of Kerala in India. It lies in two panchayats - Kaipamangalam and Perinjanam.

Moonupeedika in Malayalam means "three shops". It is believed, Moonnupeedika started off as a small junction with only three shops in the early 20th century, hence its name. Now it become a spot of business in this area.

== Notable persons ==
Geethu Krishna M. G. is a youngest botanist who works on sacred groves on coastal areas comes from this small town. She was documented one of the important endemic plant Ixora malabarica (Dennst.) Mabb. from Moonupeedika during her botanical research.
