= Kuttanadan Marpappa =

- Theatrical release poster
- Directed by: Sreejith Vijayan
- Written by: Sreejith Vijayan
- Produced by: Haseeb Haneef; Noushad Alathur; Aji Medayil
- Starring: Kunchacko Boban; Surabhi Santosh; Aditi Ravi
- Cinematography: Arvind Krishna
- Edited by: Sunil S. Pillai
- Music by: Rahul Raj
- Production companies: Malayalam Movie Makers; Achicha Cinemas
- Distributed by: Raha International; Sree Senthil Pictures
- Release date: 29 March 2018
- Running time: 138 minutes
- Country: India
- Language: Malayalam

Kuttanadan Marpappa is a 2018 Indian Malayalam-language romantic comedy film written and directed by Sreejith Vijayan (in his directorial debut). The cast includes Kunchacko Boban, Surabhi Santosh, Aditi Ravi, Innocent, Ramesh Pisharody, and Dharmajan Bolgatty. Kuttanadan Marpappa was released in India on 29 March 2018.

== Plot ==
John Paul, known to the natives by his pet name "Marpappa" is a photographer from Karuvatta, Alappuzha, living with his mother Mary, who runs a ration shop. His father had committed suicide by jumping into backwaters during John's childhood. John developed aquaphobia after seeing his father's dead body, and thus he has not learnt to swim, despite living near backwaters.

Jessy is the daughter of Panchayat president Oomachan and is a BDS final year student. She is saved by John from an attempted suicide after failing in the final exam. Jessy and John get to know each other and ends up in a romantic relationship. John helps Jessy to produce a fake degree certificate by taking a mortgage loan to meet the expense. Later, Jessy breaks up with John after getting a marriage proposal from wealthy fashion photographer Peter and realising that John's income would not match her needs. After, she goes abroad for a job.

Jessy returns to the homeland and her marriage with Peter is being arranged. In the meantime, Jessy had found out that Peter is actually an erotic photographer. She extorts money from his father in exchange for not exposing Peter. It is revealed that Peter had already known about her fake certificate and intimidate her when she tries to break up with him. Meanwhile, the bank forecloses John's home.

John later pretends that he is still in love with Jessy and finally with her help, John retains his residential documents from the bank. John finally confesses that he cannot maintain a relationship with Jessy as she changes her color as per the situations. Jessy has no other choice other than to marry Peter as Peter knows everything about Jessy, including her fake certificate, illegal immigration and illegal job claim in London.

Meanwhile, Jessy's younger sister Annie and John falls in love. John marries Annie on the same day as Jessy marries Peter.

Later in the movie, it is revealed that Fr. Innocent who performed both the marriages was betrayed by Jessy in their school days & John's mother Mrs. Mary was the mastermind behind John and Annie's marriage.

== Cast ==
- Kunchacko Boban as John Paul a.k.a. Marpappa
  - Gourav Menon as Young John Paul
- Dharmajan Bolgatty as Motta, John's friend
  - Adish Praveen as Young Motta
- Surabhi Santosh as Annie, Jessy's sister & John's wife
- Aditi Ravi as Dr.Jessy, John's lover
- Shanthi Krishna as Mary, John's mother
- Ramesh Pisharody as Peter, Jessy's husband
- Jaya Menon as Ummachan's wife
- Mallika Sukumaran as Peter's Grandmother
- Aju Varghese as Fr. Innocent
- Innocent as Ummachan, Jessy's father
- Hareesh Perumanna as Cleetus
- Tini Tom as Thomachan
- Salim Kumar as Philipose
- Soubin Shahir as Freddy
- V. K. Prakash as Peter's father
- Sunil Sukhada as Vicar
- Aneesh Ravi as Joseph
- Suresh Thampanoor as Villager
- Rajeev Rajan as Cameraman
- Sohan Seenulal as ICD Card Executive
- Sibi Thomas as Police officer
- Binu Adimali as Mathayi
- Sunil Babu as Villager
- Sasi Kalinga as Pappichen
- Nadirshah as Doctor
- Kochu Preman as Peter's relative
- Dinesh Prabhakar as Peter's friend
- Noby Marcose as Brittas
- Sajan Palluruthy as Abu
- Kollam Sudhi as politician
- Vinod Kedamangalam as Politician
- Ullas Pandalam as Police constable
- Swasika as Jinu
- Kulappulli Leela as Motta's mother
- Manju Sunichen as Minimol
- Baby Ishaan Muhammed as Baby in the Crowd
- Ajitha Thayankari as Baby's Mother
- Deepika Mohan as Janaki's mother
- Molly Kanamaly as Villager
- Sarath Thenumoola as Sayippu(Foreigner).

== Production ==
The shoot commenced at Kodanad, Alappuzha and nearby places in late November 2017. Kuttanadan Marpappa is the directorial debut of cinematographer Sreejith Vijayan. Shanthi Krishna plays a single mother in the film. The film's songs were composed Rahul Raj, lyrics were written by Rajeev Alunkal and Vinayan Shasikumar. Raveena Ravi dubbed for Aditi Ravi & Angel Shijoy for Surabhi Santhosh.

== Release ==
The film was released in India on 29 March 2018.

== Reception ==
The Times of India gave the film 3 out of 5 and stated: "Kuttanadan Marpappa is a perfect family entertainer". The chemistry between the actors, the background score and flawless direction are the plus points. Manorama Online gave it 3 out of 5 and wrote: "The mid-speed entertainer in the family-comedy genre keeps the audience glued to the seats". DGZ Media said that " The film is a complete package with the stunning visuals, the lovely performances of the lead actors and the comedy". Dekh News said that "This film is great in so many senses such as acting, production, and direction. It has a great screenplay and we are sure that you all are going to love it".

== Box office ==
The film grossed ₹ 8.10 crore in less than a month from Kerala box office, with a distributor's share of 3.58 crore and was semi hit at box office.
