= Koder House =

Heritage boutique hotel in Fort Kochi, Kerala, India

- Koder House in 2016

General information
- Location: Fort Kochi, Kochi, Kerala, India
- Opening: 1808

Koder House is a historic building located in Fort Kochi, Kerala, which is now used as a heritage hotel. It is built in 1808 by the Koder family. It is a three-story mansion showing the Jewish heritage and colonial history of the region.

== History ==
Koder House is considered as one of the important surviving landmarks of Fort Kochi's rich, cosmopolitan heritage. Built as a Portuguese mansion, the red-brick structure was given a facelift by Samuel S Koder, a prominent member of Cochin's Jewish community, who purchased the building and renovated it in 1905.

Koder, who died in 1994, ran the Cochin Electric Company, which was eventually sold to the government. He also began the first ferry service from Fort Kochi to Ernakulam. The Koders emigrated to Cochin from Iraq a few centuries ago.
