= Sugeeth =

Indian film director

- Born: 23 June 1978 (age 47)
- Occupation: Film director
- Years active: 2012–present
- Spouse: Saritha Nair (m. 2003)
- Children: 2

Sugeeth is an Indian film director who works in Malayalam film industry. He made his debut directorial in 2012 with the film Ordinary.

== Career ==
Sugeeth has been an associate director to Kamal since the film Gramophone in 2003 until Aagathan in 2010. He debuted as a director in 2012 with the Malayalam film Ordinary, starring Kunchacko Boban and Biju Menon.

== Personal life ==
Sugeeth married his longtime girlfriend Saritha Nair on 6 December 2003. The couple have two children, a daughter Shivani and a son Devanarayanan. Sugeeth resides in Ernakulam.

== Filmography ==
Year	Title
2012	Ordinary
2013	3 Dots
2014	Onnum Mindathe
2015	Madhura Naranga
2018	Shikkari Shambhu
2018	Kinavalli
2019	My Santa
