= Kaipamangalam =

- village
- Location in Kerala, India Kaipamangalam (India)
- Coordinates: 10°19′0″N 76°8′0″E
- Country: India
- State: Kerala
- District: Thrissur

Population (2011)
  - Total: 35,626

Languages
  - Official: Malayalam, English
- Time zone: UTC+5:30 (IST)
- PIN: 680681
- Telephone code: 91480
- Vehicle registration: KL-47
- Website: www.kaipamangalam.com

Kaipamangalam is a village in Thrissur district in the state of Kerala, India. Kaipamangalam assembly segment consist of Edavilangu, Eriyad, Kaipamangalam, Mathilakam, Perinjanam and Sreenarayanapuram Panchayats in Kodungallur Taluk.

== Demographics ==
As of 2011 India census, Kaipamangalam had a population of 35626 with 16290 males and 19336 females.

== Academic institutions ==
Kaipamangalam village has several government and aided educational institutions which includes high schools and higher secondary schools. Govt.Fisheries Vocational Higher Secondary school is one of the oldest such institutions, which celebrates its 100th year of foundation. It offers higher secondary courses in biology science, humanities, and commerce. It also has a vocational higher secondary program in aquaculture.
