= List of Malayalam films of 2024 =

This is a list of Malayalam-language films that released in 2024.

229 Malayalam films released in 2024, most of them in theatres and some directly on OTT platforms.

== Box office collection ==
The list of highest-grossing Malayalam films released in 2024, by worldwide box office gross revenue, are as follows.

The ranking of films is based on their worldwide theatrical gross collection.

Highest worldwide gross of 2024
Rank	Title	Production company	Worldwide gross	Ref
1	Manjummel Boys	Parava Films	₹242.3 crores	
2	The Goat Life	Visual Romance; Alta Global Media; Jet Media Production	₹160 crores	
3	Aavesham	Fahadh Faasil and friends	₹156 crores	
4	Premalu	Fahadh Faasil and friends Working Class Hero	₹136 crores	
5	Marco	Cubes Entertainment	₹110 crores	
6	ARM	Magic Frames	₹106.75 crores	
7	Guruvayoor Ambalanadayil	Prithviraj Productions; E4 Entertainment	₹90 crores	
8	Bramayugam	YNOT Studios; Night Shift Studios	₹85 crores	
9	Varshangalkku Shesham	Merryland Cinemas	₹81.56 crores	
10	Kishkindha Kaandam	Goodwill Entertainments	₹77 crores	

== January–March ==
*	Film released directly on OTT platform(s).

Opening		Title	Director	Cast	Production Company / Studio	Ref
JANUARY	5	Aattam	Anand Ekarshi	Vinay Forrt, Zarin Shihab, Kalabhavan Shajohn	Joy Movie Productions	
JANUARY	5	Dhabari Kyuruvi	Priyanandanan	Meenakshi, Shyamini, Anuprasobhini, Nanjiyamma, Arun Raj	Ajith VInayaka Films, AEVAS Visual Magic	
JANUARY	5	Mango Mury	Vishnu Ravi Shakkti	Jaffar Idukki, Sreekanth Murali, Sibi Thomas, Laali, Anarkali	Triani Productions	
JANUARY	5	Palayam PC	VM Anil	Kottayam Ramesh, Rahul Madhav, Niya Sankarathil, Dharmajan Bolgatty, Manju Pathrose	Chirakarot Movies	
JANUARY	5	Raastha	Aneesh Anwar	Anagha Narayanan, Sarjano Khalid, Aradhya Ann, Sudheesh	Alu Entertainments	
JANUARY	11	Abraham Ozler	Midhun Manuel Thomas	Jayaram, Anaswara Rajan, Arjun Ashokan, Anju Kurian	Manuel Movie Makers, Avenirtek Digital	
JANUARY	12	Qalb	Sajid Yahiya	Ranjith Sajeev, Neha Nazlen, Lena, Siddique	Friday Film House, Fragrant Nature	
JANUARY	19	Devil Hunters	Prajith Raveendran	Prajith Raveendran, Jinson Jose, Gouri Parvathy, Ramya M, Shivaji Guruvayoor	Rudreshwar Productions	
JANUARY	19	Mayavanam	Jagathlal Chandrasekharan	Adithya Sai, Amina Nijam, Jaffar Idukki, Sudhi Koppa	SaiSoorya Films	
JANUARY	19	My3	Rajan Kuduvan	Thalaivasal Vijay, Sabitha Anand, Rajesh Hebbar, Kalabhavan Nandana	Star Eight Movies	
JANUARY	19	Peppatty	Salim Baba	Shiva Damodhar, Neha Saxena, Akshara Nair, Sudheer Karamana	SilverSky Productions	
JANUARY	19	Perumkaaliyattam	Sunil K Thilak	M S Nassar, Ullas Panthalam, Anaga Madhu	KalaSagara Films	
JANUARY	19	Pinnil Oral	Satheesh Ananthapuri	Salmanul Faris, Aaradhya Sai, I. M. Vijayan	Viswa Shilpi Productions	
JANUARY	19	Vivekanandan Viralanu	Kamal	Shine Tom Chacko, Swasika, Grace Antony, Mareena Michael Kurisingal	Nediyath Productions	
JANUARY	21	Andru the Man	Sivakumar Kankol	Harisree Ashokan, Anumol	Cinema Veedu	
JANUARY	22	Hodu	Anush Mohan	Roopesh Peethambaran, Harikrishnan Sanu, Sarath Vadi	KL 01 Cinemas	
JANUARY	25	Malaikottai Vaaliban	Lijo Jose Pellissery	Mohanlal, Sonalee Kulkarni, Danish Sait, Suchithra Nair, Katha Nandi	John & Mary Creative, Century Films, Maxlab Cinemas and Entertainments, Saregama, Amen Movie Monastery	
FEBRUARY	2	Iyer In Arabia	M. A. Nishad	Dhyan Sreenivasan, Mukesh, Urvashi, Durga Krishna	Wealth I Productions	
FEBRUARY	2	Kallanmarude Veedu	Hussain Aroni	Biju Kuttan, Sunil Sukhada, Bineesh Bastin	KH Productions	
FEBRUARY	2	Kurinji	Gireesh Kunnumel	Aavani Avoos, Anishitha Vasu, Prakash Vadikkal	Sree Mookambika Communications	
FEBRUARY	2	LLB: Life Line of Bachelors	A M Sidhique	Sreenath Bhasi, Anoop Menon, Vishak Nair, Karthika Suresh	Randathani FIlms	
FEBRUARY	2	Mrudhu Bhave Dhruda Kruthye	Shajoon Kariyal	Sooraj Sun, Sravana T N, Mariya Prince, Sunny Leone	Hydroair Tectonics	
FEBRUARY	2	Ozhuki Ozhuki Ozhuki	Sanjeev Sivan	Sidhanshu Sanjeev, Soubin Shahir, Baiju Santhosh, Anjana Appukuttan	Tripod Motion Pictures	
FEBRUARY	2	Rhithum - Beyond The Truth	Lalji George	Shaju Shaam, Soniya Malhaar, Aadithya Jyothy	Magic Lantern Movies	
FEBRUARY	9	Jerry	Anish Uday	Kottayam Nazeer, Pramod Velliyanad, Kumar Sethu	J Cinema Company	
FEBRUARY	9	Anweshippin Kandethum	Darwin Kuriakose	Tovino Thomas, Siddique, Indrans, Baburaj, Anagha Maya Ravi, Arthana Binu	Theatre of Dreams	
FEBRUARY	9	Premalu	Girish A. D.	Naslen, Mamitha Baiju, Mathew Thomas, Sangeeth Prathap, Akhila Bhargavan, Shyam Mohan	Bhavana Studios	
FEBRUARY	15	Bramayugam	Rahul Sadasivan	Mammootty, Arjun Ashokan, Sidharth Bharathan, Amalda Liz	Night Shift Studios, YNOT Studios	
FEBRUARY	16	Andhakara	Vasudev Sanal	Divya Pillai, Chandhunadh, Mareena Michael	Ace of Hearts Cine Productions	
FEBRUARY	16	Manas	Babu Thiruvalla	Manoj K. Jayan, Sheelu Abraham, Ashokan (actor)	Symphony creations	
FEBRUARY	16	Thundu	Riyas Shereef	Biju Menon, Shine Tom Chacko, Unnimaya Prasad	Ashiq Usman Productions	
FEBRUARY	19	The Suspect List	Irfan Kamal	Vineeth Kumar, Vrinda Pilakkal, Anaz Mohamed, Prasida Vasu, Binu Dev, Adhil Shajahan, Vivek Viswam, Viya Catherine	Popart Media Productions	
FEBRUARY	22	Family	Don Palathara	Vinay Forrt, Divya Prabha, Mathew Thomas, Nilja K Baby	Newton Cinema	
FEBRUARY	22	Manjummel Boys	Chidambaram	Soubin Shahir, Sreenath Bhasi, Balu Varghese	Parava Films, Sree Gokulam Movies	
FEBRUARY	22	Arivaal	Anish Paul	Shaiju Hamsa, Janaki Sudheer	APC Productions	
FEBRUARY	23	Choppu	Rahul Kaimala	Sanil Mattannur, Kottayam Nazeer, Sarayu Mohan	Gateway Cinemas	
MARCH	1	Aanandhapuram Diaries	Jaya Jose Raj	Srikanth, Meena, Manoj K. Jayan, Shikha Santosh	Neil Productions	
MARCH	1	Kadakan	Sajil Mampad	Hakim Shajahan, Sona Olickal, Harisree Ashokan	Kadathanadan Cinemas	
MARCH	1	The SpOils	Manjith Divakar	Anjali Ameer, Preethi Christina Paul, Darsha Dylan, M.A.Rahim	Marben Studios, Arya Aadhi International Movies	
MARCH	7	Thankamani	Ratheesh Reghunandan	Dileep, Neeta Pillai, Pranitha Subhash, Manoj K. Jayan, Ajmal Ameer, Malavika Menon	Super Good Films	
MARCH	8	Agathokakological	C D Venkitesh	Maqbool Salmaan, Leona Lishoy, Prasant Murali	Hit and Run Pictures	
MARCH	8	Randaam Naal	Zeenath	Jithin Mohammed, Zeenath, Mamukkoya, Nilambur Ayisha	AVA Productions	
MARCH	8	5 Seeds	Aswin P S	Aswin P S	Aswin’s Production House	
MARCH	8	Exit	Mohammed Shaheen	Vishak Nair, Reneesha Rahiman, Hareesh Peradi	Bloom Entertainments	
MARCH	8	Kuruvi Paapa	Joshy John	Tanha Fatima, Vineeth, Muktha, Lal Jose	Zero Plus Entertainments	
MARCH	8	Manasa Vacha	Sreekumar Podiyan	Dileesh Pothan, Alexander Prasanth, Ahana Vinesh	Start Action Cut	
MARCH	8	Oru Sarkar Ulpannam	T. V. Renjith	Gouri G. Kishan, Aju Varghese, Subeesh Sudhi	Bhavani Productions	
MARCH	14	Pakal Iravu	Benny Aynick	Praveen Varier, Maja Sandhya, Saranya Krishnan	Qdoz entertainment	
MARCH	15	Anchakkallakokkan	Ullas Chemban	Lukman Avaran, Chemban Vinod Jose, Megha Thomas, Merin Philip	Chembosky Motion Pictures	
MARCH	15	Dial 100	Ratheesh Nedumangad	Santhosh Keezhattoor, Meera Nair, Archana Krishna	VRS Combines	
MARCH	15	Gangayude Veedu	Rajesh Puthenveettil	Chandran Pillai, Sreesha Santhosh, Devika Nair	R Movie Creations	
MARCH	15	Ithu Vare	Anil Thomas	Kalabhavan Shajohn, Letha Sunil	All Smiles Dream Movies	
MARCH	15	Jananam: 1947 Pranayam Thudarunnu	Abhijith Ashokan	Jayaraj Kozhikkode, Leela Samson, Anu Sithara, Deepak Parambol	Crayons Pictures	
MARCH	15	Oru Kadannal Katha	Pradeep Velayudhan	Jaffar Idukki, Nisha Sarang, Sudheer Karamana, Jolly Chirayath	TKV Productions, Devakannya Productions	
MARCH	22	Burning Ghost	AKB Kumar	Boban Alummoodan, Jojo Cyriac, Vaiga Rose	SJ Productions	
MARCH	22	Ennittum Neeyenne Arinjillallo	Shiju Panavoor	Padmaraj Ratheesh, Renu Saunder, Aristo Suresh, Pauly Wilson	Matha Films	
MARCH	22	Kuthood	Manoj K Sethu	Santhosh Keezhattoor, Siji Pradeep, Vinod Mulleria	Four Friends Production House	
MARCH	22	Secret Home	Abhayakumar K	Chandhunadh, Aparna Das, Sshivada, Anu Mohan	Wow Cinemas	
MARCH	28	The Goat Life	Blessy	Prithviraj Sukumaran, Amala Paul, Jimmy Jean-Louis	Visual Romance	
MARCH	28	Moonam Ghattam	Ranji Vijayan	Ranji Vijayan, Simi Jose, Joy Eeswar, Samatha Sijo	Yavanika Talkies	
MARCH	28	Vayasethrayaayi? Muppathiee..!!	Pappan T. Nambiar	Prasant Murali, Chithra Nair, Manju Pathrose, Nirmal Palazhi, Remya Suresh	No Limit Films	
MARCH	29	Swaram	Nikhil Madhav	Joy Mathew, Kozhikode Narayanan Nair, Kavitha Baiju, Malavika Nandan, Maya Unnithan	Rajakeeyam Cinemas	

== April–June ==
Opening		Title	Director	Cast	Production Company / Studio	Ref
APRIL	5	Badal - The Manifesto	G Ajayan	Shwetha Menon, Salim Kumar, Joy Mathew, Gayathri Suresh	Alternate Cinemas	
APRIL	5	Chappakuthu	Ajaish Sudhakaran	Hima Shankari, Lokesh Arumugam, Tom Skot	JS Entertainments	
APRIL	5	L	Shoji Sebastian	Sandhya Manoj, Joshy Krishna, Amritha Menon, Aswathi Pillai, Vishnu Vijayan, Aswathi Arunkumar	Pop Media	
APRIL	11	Aavesham	Jithu Madhavan	Fahadh Faasil, Sajin Gopu, Pooja Mohanraj, Ashish Vidyarthi, Mansoor Ali Khan	Anwar Rasheed Entertainment, Fahadh Faasil and Friends	
APRIL	11	Varshangalkku Shesham	Vineeth Sreenivasan	Pranav Mohanlal, Nivin Pauly, Dhyan Sreenivasan, Kalyani Priyadarshan	Merryland Cinemas	
APRIL	11	Jai Ganesh	Ranjith Sankar	Unni Mukundan, Mahima Nambiar, Jomol, Leela Samson, Ashokan	Unni Mukundan Films, Dreams N Beyond	
APRIL	12	Chaar Chor	Nithin Narayanan	Sreejith Ravi, Sreekanth Vettiyar, Rajesh Hebbar, Nincy Xavier	MS Movie Factory	
APRIL	12	Udan Adi Mangalyam	Vishnu Rathikumar	Sreedevi Unnikrishnan, Libin Varghese, Abhi Kiran, Madhu Punnappra, Suresh Chitrashala, Anilamma	Kalamela Cinemas	
APRIL	19	Thurathi Malayile Thiruthukal	Arun Murali	Amalchand, Mujeeb Rehman, Biju Kattakada, Geethu Vipin, Vyshnavi Kalyani	Panchami Cinemas	
APRIL	26	Anjaam Vedam	Mujeeb T Muhammed	Vihan Vishnu, Sunu Lakshmi, Amarnath H, Soumya Raj	TM Productions	
APRIL	26	Panchavalsara Padhathi	P.G. Premlal	Siju Wilson, Krishnendu Menon, Nisha Sarang	Kichappus Entertainments	
APRIL	26	Pavi Caretaker	Vineeth Kumar	Dileep, Juhi Jayakumar, Shreya Rugmini, Rosmin Thadathil, Swathi Konde, Dilina Ramakrishnan, Radhika Sarathkumar, Johny Antony	Grand Productions	
MAY	1	Malayalee From India	Dijo Jose Antony	Nivin Pauly, Dhyan Sreenivasan, Anaswara Rajan	Pauly Jr Pictures, Magic Frames	
MAY	3	Cadburys	Mammy Century	Sahad Reju, Safna Khader, Boban Alummoodan	Century Vision	
MAY	3	Nadikar	Jean Paul Lal	Tovino Thomas, Vanya Singh Rajput, Lal, Bhavana	Godspeed, Mythri Movie Makers	
MAY	3	Poka	Arun Ayyappan	Yem Sajeev, Janaki Devi, Savitha Savithri, Athira Gopinath	Ayvans Film Factory	
MAY	9	Aaro	Kareem	Joju George, Anumol	V Three Productions, Anjali Entertainments	
MAY	10	Marivillin Gopurangal	Arun Bose	Indrajith Sukumaran, Shruti Ramachandran, Sarjano Khalid, Vincy Aloshious	Kokers Films	
MAY	10	Perumani	K B Maju	Sunny Wayne, Deepa Thomas, Lukman Avaran, Radhika Radhakrishnan, Vinay Forrt	UNE VIE Movies	
MAY	10	Sweet Chakkara Umma	Zayir Pathan	Zayir Pathan, Santosh Kalanjoor, Molly Kannamally	RMR Productions	
MAY	16	Guruvayoor Ambalanadayil	Vipin Das	Prithviraj Sukumaran, Basil Joseph, Anaswara Rajan, Nikhila Vimal, Yogi Babu	Prithviraj Productions, E4 Entertainment	
MAY	16	Kattis Gang	Aneel Dev	Unni Lalau, Althaf Salim, Swati Das Prabu, Sajin Cherukayil	Oceanic Movies	
MAY	16	Sureshanteyum Sumalathayudeyum Hrudayahariyaya Pranayakadha	Ratheesh Balakrishnan Poduval	Rajesh Madhavan, Chithra Nair, Sudheesh, Sharanya Ramachandran	Silver Bay studios, Silver Bromade Pictures	
MAY	17	Gu	Manu Radhakrishnan	Saiju Kurup, Deva Nandha, Niranj Maniyanpilla Raju, Ashwathy Manoharan, Nandini Goplalakrishnan	Maniyan Pillai Raju Productions	
MAY	17	Guardian Angel	Saju S Das	Rahul Madhav, Shobika Babu, Saju S Das, Tushara Pillai	Bhadra Gayathri Productions	
MAY	17	CID Ramachandran Retd. SI	Sanoop Sathyan	Kalabhavan Shajohn, Anumol, Balaji Sarma, Geethi Sangeetha	AD 1877 Pictures, Sense Launch Entertainments	
MAY	23	Turbo	Vysakh	Mammootty, Anjana Jayaprakash, Raj B. Shetty, Sunil, Shabareesh Varma, Dileesh Pothan	Mammootty Kampany	
MAY	24	Mandakini	Vinod Leela	Althaf Salim, Anarkali Marikar, Ganapathy	Spire Productions	
MAY	24	Thalavan	Jis Joy	Biju Menon, Asif Ali, Miya George, Anusree, Dileesh Pothan	Arun Narayan Productions, London Studios	
MAY	31	Kudumbasthreeyum Kunjadum	Mahesh P Sreenivasan	Dhyan Sreenivasan, Anna Rajan, Kalabhavan Shajohn	Indie Films	
MAY	31	Ishtaragam	Jayan Poduval	Kailash, Akash Prakash, Adithya Dileep	Akash Prakash Music & Entertainment, Pleasant Media, Essar films	
MAY	31	Once Upon a Time in Kochi	Nadirshah	Arjun Ashokan, Shine Tom Chacko, Devika Sanjay	Kalandoor Entertainments	
MAY	31	Ponmbalai Orumai	Vipin Atley	Jithish Parameswaran, Sreeshma Chandran, Sajid Yahiya, Twinkle Joby	Macrom Pictures	
MAY	31	The Mistaker Who	Maaya Sivaa	Adityadev, Sivaa Nair, Maaya Sivaa	Adityadev Films	
MAY	31	Swakaryam Sambhava Bahulam	Naseer Badarudeen	Jeo Baby, Annu Antony, Shelly N Kumar, Sajin Cherukayil	N Tales Studios	
JUNE	7	Little Hearts	Aby Treesa Paul, Anto Jose Pereira	Shane Nigam, Mahima Nambiar, Baburaj, Aima Rosmy Sebastian, Shine Tom Chacko	Sandra Thomas Productions	
JUNE	7	Abhirami	Mushthaque Rahman	Gayathri Suresh, Hari Krishna, Roshan Basheer, Ameya Mathew	MJS Media, Spectac Movies	
JUNE	7	Golam	Samjad PS	Ranjith Sajeev, Sunny Wayne, Siddique, Dileesh Pothan	Fragrant Nature Film Creations	
JUNE	7	Jamalinte Punchiri	Vicky Thambi	Indrans, Prayaga Martin, Mithun Ramesh	Chitram Creations	
JUNE	7	Mayamma	Ramesh Koramangalam	Viji Thampi, Ankhitha Vinod, Arun Unni, Jayan Cherthala	Punartham Arts Digital, Yogeeswara Films	
JUNE	7	Sree Muthappan	Chandran Narikode	Manikuttan, Madhupal, Meera Nair, Joy Mathew	Pratidhi House Creations	
JUNE	13	Pullu Rising	Amal Noushad	Surjith Gopinath, Christina Shaji, Kris Venugopal, Chitra Prasad, Hariprasad Gopinathan	Sinai Pictures	
JUNE	14	DNA	T. S. Suresh Babu	Raai Laxmi, Ashkar Saudan, Aju Varghese	Benzy Productions	
JUNE	14	Grr	Jay K	Kunchacko Boban, Suraj Venjaramoodu, Shruti Ramachandran, Anagha LK	August Cinema	
JUNE	14	Murivu	K Shemeer	Ajai Vasudev, Sona Philip, Sharook Shameer, Krishna Praveena	Way To Film Entertainments	
JUNE	14	Oru Kadha Parayum Neram	Rays Sidhik	Rays Sidhik, Roshni Madhu, Geetha Vijayan, Seema G. Nair	Frame 2 Frame, Aimtime Media	
JUNE	21	Ullozhukku	Christo Tomy	Parvathy Thiruvothu, Urvashi, Prashanth Murali, Arjun Radhakrishnan	RSVP Movies, MacGuffin Pictures, Reverie Entertainment	
JUNE	21	Nadanna Sambhavam	Vishnu Narayan	Biju Menon, Suraj Venjaramoodu, Shruti Ramachandran, Lijomol Jose	Anup Kannan Stories, Godspeed Immigration	
JUNE	21	Matthu	Renjith Laal	Tini Tom, Santhosh Keezhattoor, Aish Vika	Kannur Cinema Factory	
JUNE	21	Monica: Oru AI Story	E M Ashraf	Sreepath Yan, Aparna Mulberry, Gopinath Muthukad, Sini Abraham	Zams Productions	
JUNE	21	Uncleum Kuttyolum	GKN Pillai	GKN Pillai, Shivani Saya, Adish Praveen	Pee Yee Cinemas	
JUNE	21	Gaganachari	Arun Chandu	Anarkali Marikar, Gokul Suresh, Aju Varghese, K. B. Ganesh Kumar	Ajith Vinayaka Films, Krishand Films	
JUNE	21	Swargathile Katturumbu	Jespal Shanmughan	Dhyan Sreenivasan, Joy Mathew, Gowri Nandha	Myna Creations	
JUNE	28	Big Ben	Bino Augustine	Anu Mohan, Aditi Ravi, Vinay Forrt, Miya George	Braintree Productions	
JUNE	28	Kunddala Puranam	Santhosh Puthukunnu	Indrans, Remya Suresh, Sivaani shibin, Dinesh Prabhakar, Unni Raja	Menokkils Films	
JUNE	28	Paradise	Prasanna Vithanage	Roshan Mathew, Darshana Rajendran, Mahendra Perera, Shyam Fernando	Newton Cinema, Madras Talkies	
JUNE	28	Pattaapakal	Saajir Sadaf	Krishna Sankar, Ashika Ashokan, Sudhi Koppa, Ramesh Pisharody	Sree Nandanam Films	

== July–September ==
Opening		Title	Director	Cast	Production company / Studio	Ref
JULY	2	Adhinayakavadham	Dinesh Ganga	Priyesh M Pramod, Vaishnavi, Bibu Ebenezer, Shilpa C S	Oneline Story Movies	
JULY	5	Partners	Naveen John	Dhyan Sreenivasan, Satna Titus, Kalabhavan Shajohn	Kollappally Films	
JULY	5	Ezhuthola	Suresh Unnikrishnan	Shankar, Hemanth Menon, Nisha Sarang	Oshio Entertainments	
JULY	5	Kurukku	Abhijith Noorani	Anil Anto, Balaji Sarma, Preetha Pradeep, Meera Nair	Nisha Productions	
JULY	5	Oru Smartphone Prenayam	Charles G Thomas	Hemanth Menon, Nayana Prasad, Aswathi Ashok, Padmaraj Ratheesh, Saritha Kuku	Skyshare Pictures	
JULY	6	Kanaka Rajyam	Sagar Hari	Murali Gopy, Indrans, Leona Lishoy, Athira Patel, Jolly Chirayath	Ajith Vinayaka Films	
JULY	12	Amar Mera Doasth	AKB Kumar	Dharmajan Bolgatty, Binu Adimali	AKB Films	
JULY	12	Zha	Gireesh P C	Manikandan R. Achari, Naira Nihar, Nandu Anand, Santhosh Keezhattoor	VOC Media	
JULY	13	Kannadipparambile Kalyana Aalochana	Jithin Jitix	Chitra Nair	Jeeshma Productions	
JULY	19	Idiyan Chandhu	Sreejith Vijayan	Vishnu Unnikrishnan, Jayashree Shivadas, Gayatri Arun, Lena, Vidhya Vijayakumar, Sminu Sijo	Happy Productions	
JULY	19	Puthiya Niram	Sunee Sekhar	Pranav Mohanan, Shihan Ahmed, Rathnakala Thankam, Pappan Maniyur	20 Productions	
JULY	19	Samadhana Pusthakam	Raveesh Nath	Siju Wilson, Leona Lishoy, Mathew Thomas, Pramod Veliyanad	Sigma stories	
JULY	19	Vishesham	Sooraj Tom	Anand Madhusoodanan, Chinnu Chandini. Altaf Salim, Dileesh Pothan	Step2Films	
JULY	20	No Evidence	AKB Kumar	Jaffar Idukki, Nasser Latheef, Nirusha Adika, Nimisha Bijo	AKB Films	
JULY	23	Eye Witness	AKB Kumar	Boban Alumoodan, Spadikam George, Brahmaduth, Cristy Binnet	AKB Films	
JULY	26	Level Cross	Arfaz Ayub	Asif Ali, Amala Paul, Sharaf U Dheen	Abhishek Films	
JULY	26	Panchayath Jetty	Manikandan Pattambi, Salim Hassan	Manikandan Pattambi, Salim Hassan, Niyas Backer, Rachana Narayanankutty, Sneha Sreekumar	Saptha Tharang Creation, Govind Films	
JULY	26	Secret	S. N. Swamy	Dhyan Sreenivasan, Aparna Das, Jacob Gregory, Kalesh Ramanand	Lakshmi Parvathy Vision	
JULY	31	Raghu 32 Inch	Rajesh Vadakod	Manoj Valamchuzhi, Ranjitha Gautham, Thulasidas, Manasa Prabhu	Krishna Productions	
AUGUST	2	Prappeda	Krishnendu Kalesh	Rajesh Madhavan, Ketaki Narayanan	Hybrid Tellers	
AUGUST	9	Checkmate	Ratish Sekhar	Anoop Menon, Rekha Harindran, Swapneel Batra	Seed Entertainments, Goodfellas in Films	
AUGUST	9	Cicada	Sreejith Edavana	Rajith CR, GayathrI Mayoora, Jaise Jose	Theerna Films & Entertainment	
AUGUST	9	Super Zindagi	Vintesh	Dhyan Sreenivasan, Mukesh, Parvati Nair	666 Productions	
AUGUST	9	Adios Amigo	Nahas Nazar	Asif Ali, Suraj Venjaramoodu, Anagha	Ashiq Usman Productions	
AUGUST	9	Makudi	Ponnus Bright	Sudheer Karamana, Aristo Suresh, Kochu Preman	BPR Productions	
AUGUST	9	Memory Plus	K T Mansoor	Aneesh Menon, Annu Antony, Sminu Sijo	Global Cinema Company	
AUGUST	9	Ormachithram	Oru Vazhipokkan	Harikrishnan, Manasa Radhakrishnan, Shivaji Guruvayoor	Indian Brothers Films, Zaga International	
AUGUST	15	Nunakuzhi	Jeethu Joseph	Basil Joseph, Grace Antony, Nikhila Vimal, Siddique, Manoj K. Jayan, Baiju Santhosh, Aju Varghese, Saiju Kurup	Yoodlee Films, Saregama, Bedtime Stories	
AUGUST	15	Maoist	Prathap Joseph	Ratheesh Sundar, Sharath Buho, Kevin Shuaib, Vasu Nadavannur	Minimal Cinemas	
AUGUST	15	Vaazha - Biopic of a Billion Boys	Anand Menon	Siju Sunny, Amith Mohan Rajeswari, Joemon Jyothir	WBTS Productions, ICON Studios, Imagin Cinemas	
AUGUST	23	Hunt	Shaji Kailas	Bhavana, Renji Panicker, Chandhunadh	Jayalakshmi Films	
AUGUST	23	Footage	Saiju Sreedharan	Manju Warrier, Vishak Nair, Gayathri Ashok	Pale Blue Dot, Movie Bucket, Martin Prakkat Films	
AUGUST	23	Karnika	Arun Venpala	Priyanka Nair, T. G. Ravi, Adhav Ram, Viaan Mangalassery	Aries Telecasting	
AUGUST	23	Thaanara	Haridas	Vishnu Unnikrishnan, Shine Tom Chacko, Aju Varghese, Deepti Sati, Chinnu Chandni, Sneha Babu	Oneday Films	
AUGUST	23	Paalum Pazhavum	V. K. Prakash	Meera Jasmine, Aswin Jose	2 Creative Minds	
AUGUST	29	Virunnu	Kannan Thamarakkulam	Arjun Sarja, Nikki Galrani, Aju Varghese	Neyyar Films	
AUGUST	30	Bharathanatyam	Krishnadas Murali	Saiju Kurup, Sai Kumar, Swathi Das Prabhu, Abhiram Radhakrishnan	Thomas Thiruvalla Films, Saiju Kurup Entertainments	
AUGUST	30	Churul	Arun J Mohan	Pramod Veliyanadu, Sona Abraham, Kalabhavan Jinto	KSFDC	
AUGUST	30	Kattappadathe Manthrikan	Faisal Hussain	Sumith M B, Vinod Kovoor, Priya Sreejith, Neema Mathew	Al Amana Productions	
AUGUST	30	Manorajyam	Rasheed Parakkal	Govind Padmasoorya, Ranjitha Menon	Indie Genius Films	
AUGUST	30	Pattam	Rejeesh Raja	Chittu Abraham, Layana Ramesh, Sree Darsh, Risha Haridas	Bigzona Productions	
AUGUST	30	Sambavasthalathu Ninnum	Sinto David	Sinseer, Dayyana Hameed, Lal Jose, Sudheer Karamana, Sunil Sukhada, Aswathy Sreekanth	India Sneham Productions	
SEPTEMBER	7	Dreadful Chapters	Nirmal Baby Varghese	Jeffin Joseph, Varun Ravindran	Casablanca Film Factory	
SEPTEMBER	12	A.R.M	Jithin Lal	Tovino Thomas, Krithi Shetty, Aishwarya Rajesh, Basil Joseph	Magic Frames, UGM Entertainments	
SEPTEMBER	12	Kishkindha Kaandam	Dinjith Ayyathan	Asif Ali, Aparna Balamurali, Vijayaraghavan	Kaka Stories, Goodwill Entertainments	
SEPTEMBER	13	Bad Boyz	Omar Lulu	Rahman, Bibin George, Sheelu Abraham	Abaam Movies	
SEPTEMBER	13	Gangs of Sukumarakurup	Shebi Chowghat	Rushin Kailas, Abu Salim, Ineya, Pooja Mohanraj	Prajeevam Movies	
SEPTEMBER	13	Kondal	Ajit Mapally	Antony Varghese, Raj B. Shetty, Shabeer Kallarakkal, Gauthami Nair	Weekend Blockbusters	
SEPTEMBER	13	Prathibha Tutorials	Abhilash Raghavan	Altaf Salim, Sudheesh, Johny Antony, Nirmal Palazhi, Anjana Appukuttan	Goodday Movies	
SEPTEMBER	20	Kadha Innuvare	Vishnu Mohan	Biju Menon, Methil Devika, Nikhila Vimal, Noila Francy, Anu Mohan, Siddique	Imagin Movies	
SEPTEMBER	20	Akri Kallyanam	Captain Vijay	Nirmal Palazhi, Binija Chelembra, Captain Vijay	Devaparvam Movies	
SEPTEMBER	20	Kuttante Shinigami	Rasheed Parakkal	Indrans, Jaffar Idukki, Chandana Aravind	Manjadi creations	
SEPTEMBER	21	All We Imagine as Light	Payal Kapadia	Kani Kusruti, Divya Prabha, Chhaya Kadam, Azees Nedumangad	Petit Chaos, Chalk & Cheese Films, BALDR Film, Les Films Fauves, Pulpa Films, Arte France Cinéma	
SEPTEMBER	27	Cup - Love All Play	Sanju V Samuel	Mathew Thomas, Basil Joseph, Namitha Pramod, Anikha Surendran	Ananya Films	
SEPTEMBER	27	Chithini	East Coast Vijayan	Amith Chakalakkal, Mokksha, Vinay Forrt. Arathy Nair	East Coast Communications	
SEPTEMBER	27	Gumasthan	Amal K Joby	Dileesh Pothan, Bibin George, Jais Jose, Rony David Raj	Muzafir Film Company	

== October–December ==
Opening		Title	Director	Cast	Production company / Studio	Ref
OCTOBER	2	Kummaattikkali	R K Vincent Selva	Madhav Suresh, Yami Sona	Super Good Films	
OCTOBER	4	Oru Kattil Oru Muri	Shanavas K Bavakutty	Hakkim Shah, Poornima Indrajith, Priyamvada Krishnan	Saptha Tharang Creations, Vikramadithyan Films	
OCTOBER	4	Koon	Prasanth B Molickal	Limal Padth, Sithara Vijayan, Lekshmika Sajeevan	Golden trumpet Entertainments	
OCTOBER	4	Lutto & Monai	T S Arun Giladi	D L Baburaj	Arunodayam Creations	
OCTOBER	4	Pushpaka Vimanam	Ullas Krishna	Siju Wilson, Balu Varghese	Rayona Rose Productions	
OCTOBER	4	Thekku Vadakku	Prem Sankar	Vinayakan, Suraj Venjaramoodu, Anishma Anilkumar	Anjana Talkies, VARS Studios	
OCTOBER	4	Thanupp	Ragesh Narayanan	Nidheesh Nambiar, Jibiya T.C	Kashi Cinemas	
OCTOBER	17	Bougainvillea	Amal Neerad	Kunchacko Boban, Fahadh Faasil, Jyothirmayi, Veena Nandakumar, Srinda	Amal Neerad Productions, Udaya Pictures	
OCTOBER	18	Porattu Nadakam	Naushad Saffron	Saiju Kurup, Aiswarya Mithun	Emirates Productions	
OCTOBER	18	Krouryam	Sandeep Ajithkumar	Sinoj Max, Nimiaha Bijo, Aadhi Shan, Naira Nihar	Divine Creations	
OCTOBER	18	Saghav Gourisankar	Vasudevan Pattuvam	Ajayraj, Sajina Vijesh, Anju Shejin, Vinod Keezhattoor	Mankunnam Films	
OCTOBER	18	Nayakan Prithvi	Prasad G Edward	Sreekumar Nair, Priya Balan, Anjali P Kumar, Sukanya Haridas	Vaisali Productions	
OCTOBER	24	Pani	Joju George	Joju George, M G Abhinaya, Abhaya Hiranmayi, Chandini Sreedharan	Appu Paathu Papu Productions, AD Studios	
OCTOBER	24	Kundannoorile Kulsitha Lahala	Akshay Ashok	Lukman Avaran, Veena Nair, Asha Madathil	Cadre Cine Creations	
OCTOBER	25	Pallotty 90s Kids	Jithin Raj P	Arjun Ashokan, Balu Varghese, Niranjana Anoop	CP Film Productions	
OCTOBER	25	Chandranum Policeum	Sreeji Balakrishnan	Anoop Krishnan, Jayashree Sivadas, Madhu Vibhakar	MC Movies	
OCTOBER	25	Dhaya Bharati	K J Vijayakumar	Appani Sarath, Hariharan, Neha Saxena, Niya Varghese, Kailash	Sri Thamburan Internation Films	
OCTOBER	25	Thrayam	Sanjith Chandrasenan	Sunny Wayne, Dhyan Sreenivasan, Anarkali Marikar, Aju Varghese, Sarayu Mohan	Ajith Vinayaka Films	
NOVEMBER	1	Oshana	N V Manoj	Dhyan Sreenivasan, Varsha Viswanath, Balaji Jayarajan, Althaf Salim, Gowri Gopant	MJN Productions	
NOVEMBER	1	Chaama	Sambraj Nair	Naseef Othayi, Sanooja Abubeckar	Manjusallapam Media	
NOVEMBER	7	I Am Kathalan	Girish A. D.	Naslen, Lijomol Jose, Anishma Anilkumar	Dr. Paul Entertainment	
NOVEMBER	8	Mura	Muhammed Mustafa	Suraj Venjaramoodu, Kani Kusruti, Hridhu Haroon. Parvathi T.	HR Pictures	
NOVEMBER	8	Oru Anweshanathinte Thudakkam	M. A. Nishad	Shine Tom Chacko, Durga Krishna, Swasika, M. A. Nishad, Sshivada, Vani Viswanath, Samuthirakani	Benzy Productions	
NOVEMBER	8	Swargam	Rejish Antony	Johny Antony, Aju Varghese, Ananya, Thushara Pillai	CN Global Movies	
NOVEMBER	15	Anand Sreebala	Vishnu Vinay	Arjun Ashokan, Aparna Das, Saiju Kurup, Dhyan Sreenivasan, Aju Varghese, Malavika Manoj	Kavya Film Company	
NOVEMBER	15	Ee Bendham Soopara	N Ramachandran Nair	Abin Joseph, Devika Raj, Major Ravi, Kuttyedathi Vilasini	Little Daffodils Productions	
NOVEMBER	17	Raaz	Razik Lawa	Jithin Thomas, Rahul K, Razik Lawa	6R Pictures	
NOVEMBER	21	Hello Mummy	Vaishakh Elans	Sharaf U Dheen, Aishwarya Lekshmi, Joemon Jyothir, Bindu Panicker	Hangover Films, A&HS Production House	
NOVEMBER	22	Sookshmadarshini	MC Jithin	Basil Joseph, Nazriya Nazim, Akhila Bhargavan, Pooja Mohanraj	Happy Hours Entertainments, AVA Productions	
NOVEMBER	22	Ekan Anekan	Chidambara Palaniappan	Manikandan R. Achari, Garggi Ananthan, Manoj K U	Dram Max studios	
NOVEMBER	22	Njan Kandatha Sare	Varun Panicker	Indrajith Sukumaran. Mareena Michael Kurisingal, Anoop Menon	Highline Pictures, Lemon Productions	
NOVEMBER	22	Parakramam	Arjun Ramesh	Dev Mohan, Siju Sunny, Amith Mohan Rajeswari, Joemon Jyothir	Millennial Films	
NOVEMBER	22	Prethangalude Kootam	Sudheer Sali	Sudhi Koppa, Soni Azeem, Abhirami Prabhan	Glady Visions Productions	
NOVEMBER	22	Ramanum Kadheejayum	Dinesh Poochakkad	Harishankar D, Aparna Hari, Urmila Vaishakh	Kanhangad Films	
NOVEMBER	22	Ramuvinte Manaivikal	Suthish Subramanyam	Balu Sreedhar, Athira Jayan, Sruthi Ponnu	MVK Films	
NOVEMBER	22	Turkish Tharkkam	Navaz Suleiman	Sunny Wayne, Anagha Narayanan, Lukman Avaran, Amina Nijam	Big Pictures	
NOVEMBER	22	Two Men Army	Nizar Abdulkhader	Shaheen Siddique, Indrans, Snighda Maria, Diny Daniel, Kailash	SK Communication	
NOVEMBER	23	Kaadu Vettiya Vivaram Aadhyam Arinjathu Maramkothikalairunnu	Ashin Jose	Aswin Krishna, Vishnu Narayan, Thamban Kodakkad, Alpha Mariya Tom, Edwin Tomy	Pumpkin Medium	
NOVEMBER	29	Her	Lijin Jose	Urvashi, Parvathy Thiruvothu, Aishwarya Rajesh, Remya Nambeesan, Lijomol Jose	A T Studios	
NOVEMBER	29	Jameelante Poovan Kozhi	A Shahjahan	Midhun Nalini, Alisha George, Bindu Panicker, Sooraj Pops, Anjana Appukuttan	Itha Productions	
NOVEMBER	29	Kaalavarshakaattu	Biju C Kannan	Santhosh Keezhattoor, Latha Das, Ambika Mohan	SRM Cinemas	
NOVEMBER	29	Kalam@24	Ragesh Krishnan	Ankith George, Shishira Relash	CMK Production, Cine House Media	
NOVEMBER	29	Sthanarthi Sreekuttan	Vinesh Viswanath	Aju Varghese, Saiju Kurup, Sruthy Suresh	Budget Lab Prosuctions	
NOVEMBER	29	Vavvalum Perakkayum	N V Manoj	Sony John, Athira Raj, Jowin Abraham. Sunil Sukhada, Jaffar Idukki	RSJPR Entertainment	
D E C E M B E R	6	Burn	Vimal Prakash	Rachana Narayanankutty, Govind Krishna	SK Creations, Dream Engine Productions	
D E C E M B E R	13	Bharatha Puzha	Manilal	Siji Pradeep, Irshad, Sreejith Ravi, Jolly Chirayath	T M Creations	
D E C E M B E R	13	Kallam	Anuram	Jeo Baby, Kailash, Nandan Rajan	Cameo Entertainments	
D E C E M B E R	13	Jeevan	Vinod Narayanan	Sinu Sidharth, Preethi Paul, Viviya Sanath	Gopika Films	
D E C E M B E R	13	Rudhiram	Jisho Lon	Raj B. Shetty, Aparna Balamurali, Priya Sreejith	Rising Sun Syudios	
D E C E M B E R	13	Swasam	Benoy Veloor	Santhosh Keezhattoor, Neena Kurup, Adarsh Sabu, Soorya J Menon	Echoes Entertainments	
D E C E M B E R	19	Rifle Club	Aashiq Abu	Dileesh Pothan, Vani Viswanath, Anurag Kashyap, Vijayaraghavan, Surabhi Lakshmi, Darshana Rajendran	OPM Cinemas	
D E C E M B E R	20	Extra Decent	Aamir Pallikkal	Suraj Venjaramoodu, Shyam Mohan, Grace Antony, Vinaya Prasad, Sudheer Karamana	Vilasini Cinemas, Magic Frames	
D E C E M B E R	20	Marco	Haneef Adeni	Unni Mukundan, Kabir Duhan Singh, Jagadish, Anson Paul, Siddique, Yukti Thareja	Cubes Entertainments	
D E C E M B E R	25	Barroz - Guardian of Treasures	Mohanlal	Mohanlal, Maya Rao West, Guru Somasundaram	Aashirvad Cinemas	
