= Naslen =

Indian actor (born 2000)

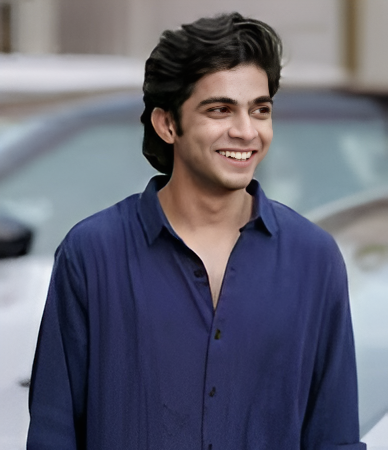
- Naslen in 2024
- Born: Naslen K. Gafoor; Kodungallur, Kerala, India
- Occupation: Actor
- Years active: 2019–present

Naslen K. Gafoor, known mononymously as Naslen, is an Indian actor who primarily works in Malayalam films. He made his acting debut with Thanneer Mathan Dinangal (2019), following which he appeared in Home (2021) and Super Sharanya (2022). Naslen earned critical and commercial success with Premalu (2024), Lokah Chapter 1: Chandra (2025) and Scene (2026).

== Early life ==
Naslen was born at Kodungallur in the Thrissur district of Kerala to K. Gafoor and Seenath on June 11, 2000. He has an elder brother as well as a twin brother. He studied at St. Joseph's School in Mathilakam and completed his higher secondary education. He later enrolled in a B.Tech. course but dropped out after two years.

== Career ==
=== Early work (2019-2023) ===
In 2019, Naslen has acted as a junior artist in Madhura Raja. His first credited role was in the movie Thanneer Mathan Dinangal in the role of Melvin. He was praised for the timely comedies and witty counter dialogues in that film. In 2021, Naslen played Rasool, a fiery teenager in the film Kuruthi which was released in Amazon Prime. In the same year he did the role of Charles Oliver Twist in the film Home which was also released in Amazon Prime. He then appeared in the comedy movie, Keshu Ee Veedinte Nadhan which was released in Disney+ Hotstar. Anna Mathews of Times Of India wrote about his performance in the film, "The young actor Naslen, as usual, even in a small role, he manages to stand out and be goofily loveable."

In 2022, he appeared in four films, including a prominent role opposite Nikhila Vimal in Jo & Jo, along with Melvin G Babu and Mathew Thomas, the latter playing one of the titular roles. The year 2023 saw him play his first solo lead role as Akhil in Journey of Love 18+. He had six releases that year and also played one of the leads, along with Mathew Thomas, in Neymar earlier in the year.

=== Recognition and commercial success (2024-present) ===
Naslen had his career breakthrough with the 2024 film Premalu, where he played a graduate from Kerala who goes to Hyderabad to take GATE coaching and falls in love with an IT employee (played by Mamitha Baiju). A commercial success, it emerged as the fourth highest-grossing Malayalam film of the year and one of the highest-grossing Malayalam films of all time. Anandu Suresh of The Indian Express noted, "Naslen skillfully navigates Sachin’s life journey, portraying each emotion with care, ensuring a believable performance." In the same year, he starred in I Am Kathalan, which became a moderate success.

In his first film of 2025, Alappuzha Gymkhana, Naslen played a 12th-grade passout. The film became a box office success and the eighth highest-grossing Malayalam film of the year. Following this, Naslen played an unemployed person who falls in love with his neighbour (a yakshi) opposite Kalyani Priyadarshan, in Lokah Chapter 1: Chandra. Manjusha Radhakrishnan of Gulf News found him to be "pitch-perfect" as the slacker next door. A major commercial success, the film emerged as the first Malayalam film to gross ₹300 crore, thus becoming the seventh highest-grossing Indian film of the year and the second highest-grossing Malayalam film of all time.

Naslen started 2026 with Mollywood Times, where he played an aspiring filmmaker. His performance received positive response and the film emerged a moderate commercial success. Naslen then expanded to Tamil films with Scene. He played a serial killer alongside Suriya and Nazriya Nazim. Janani K of India Today noted, "Naslen steals the show with his casually cool act as the ruthless Eeswaran. His effortless performance makes the character all the more fascinating."

== Filmography ==
Key
†	Denotes films that have not yet been released

=== Films ===
Year	Title	Role	Notes	Ref.
2019	Madhura Raja	Background crowd member	Uncredited role	
2019	Thanneer Mathan Dinangal	Melvin Mathew	Debut film	
2020	Varane Avashyamund	Young Bibeesh		
2021	Kuruthi	Rasool		
2021	Home	Charles Oliver Twist		
2021	Keshu Ee Veedinte Nadhan	Umesh		
2022	Super Sharanya	Sangeeth		
2022	Pathrosinte Padappukal	Boney Pathrose		
2022	Makal	Rohit / Rabindra Chathopadhyay		
2022	Jo and Jo	Manoj Sundaran		
2023	Poovan	Jikku	Cameo appearance	
2023	Ayalvaashi	Pachu		
2023	Pachuvum Athbutha Vilakkum	Arun	Cameo appearance	
2023	Neymar	Sinto Chakola		
2023	Journey of Love 18+	Akhil		
2024	Premalu	Sachin Santhosh		
2024	I Am Kathalan	Vishnu "Kathalan"		
2025	Alappuzha Gymkhana	Jojo Johnson		
2025	Lokah Chapter 1: Chandra	Sunny Kurien / Michael Joseph		
2026	Mollywood Times	Vineeth Madhavan		
2026	Scene	Eeswaran	Tamil film	
2026	Bachelor Party D'eux	Sony		
2027	Tiki Taka †	Gatsby	Filming	
2027	Mattancherry Mafia †	TBA	Pre-production	

=== Voice actor ===
Year	Title	Role	Notes	Ref.
2023	Valatty	Tippu	Animated film; voice role	

== Awards and nomination ==
Year	Award	Category	Work	Result	Ref.
2022	South Indian International Movie Awards	Best Comedian – Malayalam	Home	Won	
2024	Mazhavil Entertainment Awards	Entertainer of the Year ( with Mamitha Baiju )	Premalu	Won	
2026	South Indian International Movie Awards	Best Actor – Malayalam	Lokah Chapter 1: Chandra	Nominated	
