= Bethlehem Kudumba Unit =

2026 Indian film

- Theatrical release poster
- Directed by: Girish A. D.
- Written by: Girish A. D.; Kiran Josey
- Produced by: Fahadh Faasil; Dileesh Pothan; Syam Pushkaran
- Starring: Nivin Pauly; Mamitha Baiju; Sangeeth Prathap; Suresh Krishna; Shyam Mohan
- Cinematography: Ajmal Sabu
- Edited by: Akash Joseph Varghese
- Music by: Vishnu Vijay
- Production companies: Bhavana Studios; Working Class Hero; Fahadh Faasil and Friends
- Distributed by: Bhavana Release; Future RunUp Films; Mythri Movie Makers
- Release date: 21 August 2026
- Running time: 155 minutes
- Country: India
- Language: Malayalam
- Budget: ₹25 crore
- Box office: ₹331.09 crore

Bethlehem Kudumba Unit (transl. Bethlehem Family Unit) is a 2026 Indian Malayalam-language romantic comedy film starring Nivin Pauly and Mamitha Baiju in the lead roles, directed by Girish A. D. and produced by Fahadh Faasil, Dileesh Pothan and Syam Pushkaran.

The film was released on 21 August 2026, coinciding with the Onam festival season. The film received positive reviews from critics, who praised the performances of the cast, humour and portrayal of its central romance. It is currently the highest-grossing Malayalam film of all time and the seventh highest-grossing Indian film of 2026.

== Plot ==
The film centres on Justin and his love interest Ashley. The film begins with Ashley returning to Kerala after spending one and a half years studying in Ireland. Her return is overshadowed by an emotional memory, as a wedding takes place at the neighbouring house, reminding her of Justin, the man she had fallen in love with before leaving the country. The narrative then moves back two years to recount the events that led to their relationship.

Ashley, a college student from Mundakkayam, moves with her family to Angamaly due to their financial difficulties. She leaves behind her childhood home, friends and her band. Ashley lives with her parents and younger brother, Alan. Her father is an unreliable alcoholic, while her mother has taken responsibility for much of the family's affairs. In the new neighbourhood, Ashley becomes acquainted with the local residents comprised in the Bethlehem 'Kudumba Unit' (a term widely used in Kerala to denote a Small Christian Community (SCC), typically organised under each Parish), including Justin, a bachelor in his mid-thirties who lives next door. Justin is well known and liked in the neighbourhood. He runs a catering business, helps others with their problems and supports his younger brother, Joel, with his short-film projects. He is also a competent, smart and skilled man. He is passionate about music and used to digitise and share music online when he was younger.

Ashley discovers that Justin shares her interest in music, including the American alternative-rock band The Breeders. Their shared musical interests bring them closer. Ashley also becomes acquainted with Glikson, a younger man from the neighbourhood who shows an interest in her, but she gradually develops feelings for Justin instead. Ashley eventually realises that she is in love with Justin and makes her feelings clear to him. Justin is initially uncomfortable because of their considerable age difference. He has also experienced a painful loss in the past and had decided to remain unmarried. Although he initially attempts to dismiss Ashley's feelings, he eventually realises that he has fallen in love with her as well. With the help of Justin's nun aunt Cicily (Called Kunjaunty by Justin and Joel), the two acknowledge their feelings for each other. Ashley and Justin begin a secret relationship, knowing that their families and the neighbourhood may not accept their relationship because of their age difference. Meanwhile, the film follows the lives of the people around them. Joel becomes involved in a relationship with Sayoojya, who is also the lead actress in his short film. This creates difficulties of its own, including a family clash with Sayoojya's eccentric brother Hari, a koothu artist, and cousins. Eventually, Ashley's uncle Alex discovers the relationship between Ashley and Justin. He strongly objects to the relationship and reveals it to their families and friends, bringing the couple's secret romance into the open.

Ashley faces opposition from her family, particularly her mother. The pressure from Ashley's family, along with the age difference and Justin's own uncertainty, causes their relationship to break down. Justin asks Ashley to follow her mother's wishes to send her abroad and have her support their family, and accepts that she may have to choose her own future, even if it means losing her.

The narrative then returns to the present, with Ashley back in Kerala after her time abroad. The wedding taking place next door is of Joel's and Sayoojya's. Ashley and Justin meet again after their separation, forcing them to confront the feelings they had tried to leave behind. While sitting amongst their friends circle of Bethlehem Kudumba Unit, Ashley makes it clear that she is still unhappy about the breakup and hasn't been able to move on. Justin's friends and family then reveal that he hasn't moved on either, and that he hasn't touched alcohol since she told him not to drink.

Justin remains uncertain about whether to rekindle their relationship, worrying about her future. However, listening to Ashley talk about her feelings makes him realise that he wants to be with her. Ashley and Justin reconcile in an embrace, and decide to get married. Ashley's parents object but are forced to accept that she is an adult who cannot only live to fulfil their wishes.

== Cast ==
- Nivin Pauly as Justin Davis, Ashley's love interest
- Mamitha Baiju as Ashley Thankachan, Justin's love interest
- Roshan Shanavas as Glikson, Justin and Joel's friend
- Sangeeth Prathap as Joel Davis, Justin's younger brother
- Suresh Krishna as Baiju Xavier, Justin's friend
- Shyam Mohan as Hari, Sayoojya's brother
- Vinay Forrt as Alex, Ashley's uncle
- Srinda as Reshma Moreli, Justin's cousin
- Meenakshi Raveendran as Riya Moreli, Justin's cousin
- Sree Renjini as Renju Moreli, Justin's cousin
- Bindu Panicker as Sister Cicily / Kunjaunty, Justin and Joel's aunt
- Shameer Khan as Brinto Mundaparambil, Justin's friend
- Parvathy Ayyappadas as Sayoojya, Hari's sister and Joel's lover turned wife
- Vineeth Vishwam as Nandan Venkitangu
- Priya S Babu as Priya, Brinto's wife
- Abhiram Aravind as Alan Thankachan, Ashley's younger brother
- Jazar Clickz as Devadath, Hari's cousin
- Vettukili Prakash as Davis, Justin's and Joel's father
- Jayashankar Karimuttam as Thankachan, Ashley's and Alan's father
- Manjusree as Biji, Ashley's and Alan's mother
- Thankam Mohan as Justin's and Joel's mother
- Sanath Sivaraj as Rohith, Justin's and Joel's cousin, Moreli sisters' brother
- Abhay Ravi as Justin's and Joel's friend
- Vishnu Devi as Justin's and Joel's friend
- Vishnu Reghu as Justin's friend
- Chembil Ashokan as Ashley's and Alan's grandfather
- Syam Pushkaran as Father (Cameo Appearance)

== Production ==
=== Development ===
The film was officially announced in July 2025 from the production house of Bhavana Studios. The project marks the first collaboration between Girish A. D. and Nivin Pauly and third collaboration with Mamitha Baiju. The technical crew included cinematographer Ajmal Sabu, editor Akash Joseph Varghese, and composer Vishnu Vijay.

=== Filming ===
Principal photography began in January 2026 in Kochi following a launch ceremony attended by the cast and crew.

== Music ==
Vishnu Vijay composed the songs as well as the background scores. The first single "Maanthrikam" was released on 24 July 2026. The second single "Illey Illa" was released on 10 August 2026. The song "Yavana Kadhayil" from the unreleased film Anna originally composed by Ouseppachan and released in 1995 was reused in the film.

== Release ==
=== Theatrical ===
The film was released on 21 August 2026, coinciding with the Onam festival season and released with Khalifa: The Ruler. The film was dubbed and is scheduled for a release in Tamil and Telugu on 4 September, coinciding with Janmashtami.

=== Marketing ===
The cast and crew released a video titled Bethlehem Onam, prior to the film release, during the occasion of Onam festival.

The fictional short film Soulmates - Oru Saathukkudi Pranayam, portrayed in the film, was later released as a standalone short film on YouTube on 30 August 2026.

=== Home media ===
The film began streaming on JioHotstar from 2 October 2026 in Malayalam and dubbed versions of Tamil, Hindi, Telugu and Kannada languages.

== Reception ==
Santanu Das of Hindustan Times gave 4.5/5 stars and wrote, "The little cues will find a way to reach us. Bethlehem Kudumba Unit wants to say that there are still second chances, and all that is loved must be cared for".Anandu Suresh of The Indian Express gave 4/5 stars and wrote, "I think we all know the answer. Therefore, it’s impossible not to mention that a story like that of Bethlehem Kudumba Unit will be considered a “romantic comedy” only when the age difference is shown as it is in this film, and if the roles are reversed, it might end up being dubbed an experimental movie or, worse, a softcore film".

Gopika I. S. of The Times of India gave 3.5/5 stars and wrote, "Naturally, the film has its flaws, but as a feel-good romance, it is well made and a perfect Onam release. The climax lands well, allowing the audience to leave the theatre with a light heart".Latha Srinivasan of NDTV gave 3.5/5 stars and wrote, "Director Girish AD has shown us once again how ordinary people can be so interesting and live such rich lives filled with love, friendship, flaws and little joys. And Nivin Pauly and Mamitha Baiju make us believe that romance doesn't always have to conform to convention - it's just about two people who love each other".Vignesh Madhu of The New Indian Express gave 3.5/5 stars and wrote, "BKU may not be Girish's best film yet, but it still has plenty of enjoyable moments that easily overpower whatever little negatives it has. Currently, there aren't many around who can consistently pull off slice-of-life dramas with such charm and appeal, and there's no reason for the director to change tracks. Why fix what isn't broken?"
