= Pranaya Vilasam =

2023 Malayalam film

- Theatrical release poster
- Directed by: Nikhil Muraly
- Written by: Jyothish M Sunu AV
- Produced by: Siby Chavara; Renjith Nair
- Starring: Anaswara Rajan; Sreedhanya; Hakim Shahjahan; Manoj K U; Arjun Ashokan; Mamitha Baiju
- Cinematography: Shinoz
- Edited by: Binu Nepolean
- Music by: Shaan Rahman
- Production company: Green Room Productions
- Release date: 24 February 2023
- Country: India
- Language: Malayalam

Pranaya Vilasam (lit. 'Love address') is a 2023 Indian Malayalam movie directed by Nikhil Muraly and produced by Siby Chavara and Renjith Nair under the banner Green Room Productions. It stars Anaswara Rajan, Sreedhanya, Hakim Shahjahan, Arjun Ashokan, Mamitha Baiju and Manoj K U in the lead roles. The film was released on 24 February 2023. The film received good theater response and went onto become a super hit of 2023.

== Plot ==
Sooraj is an aspiring musician, who is in a serious relationship with his best friend Gopika. On the other hand, he is not on good terms with his family as his dad Rajeevan opposes his choice of being a musician and forces him to go into another career path. During the thick of this father-son rivalry, his mother, Rajeevan's wife Anusree is forgotten about by the duo. Rajeevan not seemingly satisfied in his relationship seeks out his once-serious ex-girlfriend Meera. They meet and talk about the old times.

One day, Anusree passes away due to heart attack. The father and son slowly begin to understand the importance and impact she had on their lives and the people around her as they grieve her death. Gopika supports Sooraj as much as she can during this time. At the same time, Rajeevan feels guilty about Meera. One day while cleaning out Anusree's things, Rajeevan comes across a diary of hers. The diary accounted for love notes and poems not detailing a timeline, that were clearly not meant for Rajeevan. An enraged Rajeevan feeling she was betraying him all this time storms out. Sooraj finds the book and realises it is for a lover that came before Rajeevan. Realising his mother wanted this ex of hers to honour her after her death, he eventually suggests locating this man to his father en route to the place to spread her ashes and honour his mother's last wish. His father initially against this idea slowly comes to and agrees.

Finding and telling this man about her death and discovering Anusree's essence which was once lost in the chaos of her family encapsulated the rest of the story.

== Cast ==
- Sreedhanya as Anusree
- Anaswara Rajan as Younger Anusree
- Hakim Shahjahan as Vinod, Anusree's ex-boyfriend
- Manoj K U as Rajeevan, Anusree's husband
- Arjun Ashokan as Sooraj, Anusree's and Rajeevan's son
- Mamitha Baiju as Gopika, Sooraj's girlfriend
- Miya George as Meera, Rajeevan's ex-girlfriend
- Sivadas Kannur as Gopika's father
- Sarath Sabha as Satheeshan, Rajeevan's office mate
- Unnimaya Naalppadam as Ramla, Sooraj's neighbour
- Arjun Unnikrishnan as Vinay, Sooraj's friend
- Sabeeta George as Sreedevi, Anusree's sister
- Irshadali Kamal

== Production ==
The first look of the film was released on 31 December 2022. The film marks the reunion of Arjun Ashokan, Mamitha Baiju and Anaswara Rajan, who played the lead characters in Super Sharanya. The production company announced the release date for 17 February 2023 and it was postponed and released on 24 February 2023. The teaser, lyrics video and trailer were released later.

== Box office ==
The movie successfully ran in theaters for four weeks with good positive response and later was released on Zee5 and Zee Keralam

== Reception ==
Anjana George critic of Times of India gave 3.5 stars out of and wrote that it was "a fresh take on romance". S. R. Praveen, a critic of The Hindu, gave a mixed review. Sajin Shrijith of The New Indian Express stated that "Pranaya Vilasam is one of those. It struck an emotional chord. It attains closure. Mission accomplished." and gave 3.5 out of 5. Sanjith Sidhardhan of OTTplay wrote that "Apart from a few moments that would tug at heartstrings, Pranaya Vilasam is a meandering affair that doesn't quite hit home."

However, a critic from Samayam gave 3.5 stars out of 5. The Indian Express critic gave a mixed review and gave 3 out 5 rating Anna MM Vetticad Critic of Firstpost stated that "Pranaya Vilasam wants to break new ground but is either too afraid or unable to go the whole hog. Neither here nor there is nowhere, and consequently, it ends up being lukewarm." and have 2.25 rating out of 5. Manorama Online critic gave a mixed review.
