= Suhail Koya =

Indian lyricist and screenwriter

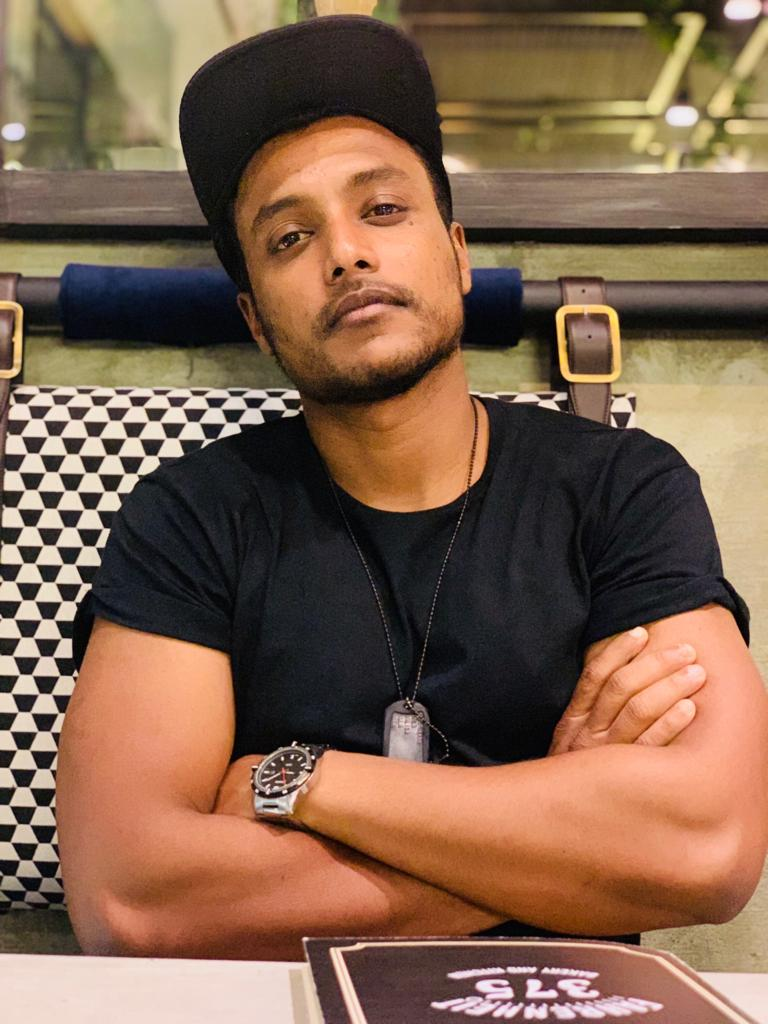
- Born: Alappuzha, Kerala
- Occupations: lyricist, screenwriter

Suhail Koya is a Malayalam lyricist and screenwriter who was born in Kerala.

Koya made his debut as a lyricist in the film Mosayile Kuthira Meenukal. His song "Jaathikkathottam" from Thanneer Mathan Dinangal received popular acclaim online.

== Career ==
Suhail Koya was born in Alappuzha, India

Koya is currently active as a screenwriter / lyricist in Malayalam cinema.

== Discography ==
Key
†	Denotes films that have not yet been released

Year	Song	Film	Notes
2014	"Aikbareesa"	Mosayile Kuthira Meenukal	
2019	"Jaathikkathottam"	Thanneer Mathan Dinangal	
2021	"Hijabi"	Meow	Lyricist
2022	"Ashubha Mangalakaari"	Super Sharanya	Lyricist
2022	"Shaaru Shaaru"	Super Sharanya	Lyricist
2022	"Shaaru In Town"	Super Sharanya	Lyricist
2022	"Pacha Paayal"	Super Sharanya	Lyricist
2022	"Kannalambili"	Super Sharanya	Lyricist
2022	"Ambili Ravum"	Palthu Janwar	
2023	"Kannu Kuzhanje"	Corona Dhavan	
2023	"Tatta Tattara"	Sesham Mike-il Fathima	
2024	"Maangatha"	Qalb	as screenwriter
2024	"Mini Maharani"	Premalu	Lyricist
2024	"Telangana Bommalu"	Premalu	Lyricist
2024	"Welcome to Hyderabad"	Premalu	Lyricist
2024	"World Malayalee Anthem"	Malayalee from India	Lyricist
2025	"Neeye Punchiri"	Lokah	Music Composer, Singer, Lyricist
2026	"Ammaputhappe"	Athiradi	Lyricist
