= School Diary =

2018 Malayalam-language film

School Diary is a 2018 Malayalam-language film written and directed by M Hajamoinu and produced by Anvar Sadath. The film stars Bhama Arun, Vismaya Viswanath, Mamitha Baiju, Reena Bashir, Ashkar Soudan, Hashim Hussain, Indrans and Balaji Sarma in the lead roles. The music was composed by M. G. Sreekumar.

== Plot ==
The story revolves around five grade XII students in a school in Kerala named Archa, Indu, Rima, Diya and Yamuna. Aarcha got covered in the news as her poem "Aksharamaalayil Amma" was going to be included in the Kerala state syllabus. They also try to make a difference by growing farm vegetables for the poor. They also come up with an idea of a "School diary" for students of their school. Different situations occur where the friendship group of five girls along with four boys are tested such that they will have to uphold their true friendship.

== Cast ==
- Bhama Arun as Archa
- Mamitha Baiju as Indu
- Anakha S. Nair as Rima
- Diyaa as Diya
- Vismaya Viswanath as Yamuna
- Hashim Hussain as Vishnu
- Reena Bashir as Archa's mother
- Indrans
- Balaji Sarma
- Ashkar Soudan as Heman
- Anvar Sadath as a Teacher
- Snisha Chandran as a Teacher
- M. G. Sreekumar as himself (Cameo appearance)

== Soundtrack ==
The music is composed by M. G. Sreekumar.

track listings
No.	Title	Singer(s)	Length
1.	"Allalalam"	Nayana Nair
2.	"Ammayanathmavin"	M G Sreekumar
3.	"Malayalamanninte"	Nayana Nair
4.	"Melle Melleve"	Nayana Nair

== Reception ==
Anna M. M. Vetticad of Firstpost gave a rating of 0/5 to the movie.
