= Mamitha Baiju =

Indian actress (born 2001)

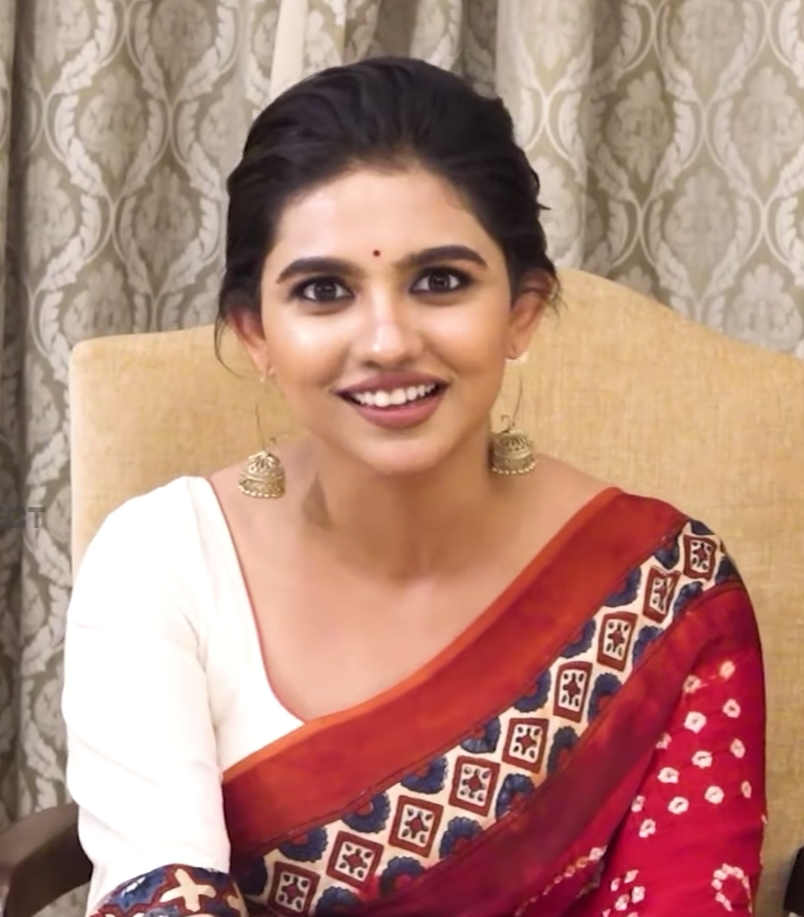
- Mamitha in 2024
- Born: Mamitha Baiju; 22 June 2001 (age 25); Kidangoor, Kottayam, Kerala, India
- Occupation: Actress
- Years active: 2016–present

Mamitha Baiju (Malayalam pronunciation: [/mɐmiːt̪ɐ bɐid͡ʒu/]) (born 22 June 2001) is an Indian actress who appears predominantly in Malayalam and Tamil films. She has acted as a child artist in an uncredited role in the 2016 film Paavada. She debuted with the 2017 film Sarvopari Palakkaran. She won the Kerala Film Critics Award for Best Supporting Actress for her role in Kho-Kho (2021). Her role in Premalu (2024) became her breakout role and the film emerged as one of the highest-grossing Malayalam films of all time. She went on to star in commercial successes such as Dude (2025), Jana Nayagan (2026), Vishwanath & Sons (2026) and Bethlehem Kudumba Unit (2026). The latter emerged as the highest-grossing Malayalam film of all time.

== Early life and education ==
Mamitha hails from Kidangoor in the Kottayam district of Kerala. She is the daughter of Dr. Baiju Krishnan, a diabetologist, and Mini. She has an elder brother, Mithun. Her parents intended to name her as Namitha, but the name was wrongly entered as Mamitha on her birth certificate which passed on to her other official documents which her parents failed to notice until enrolling her in school. Although they considered correcting the name, they ultimately decided against it.

Mamitha studied at Mary Mount Public School in Kattachira and at N.S.S. Higher Secondary School, Kidangoor. She was pursuing a B.Sc. in Psychology from the Sacred Heart College in Kochi but later dropped out during her third year due to attendance shortage.

== Career ==
=== Career beginnings and early work (2017 - 2023) ===
Mamitha has acted in an uncredited role, as a child artist in the Prithviraj starrer Paavada in 2016. She starred in Sarvopari Palakkaran (2017), followed by small supporting roles in films like Honey Bee 2: Celebrations, Dakini, Varathan and Vikruthi. She had her first prominent roles in 2021 in films like Operation Java and Kho Kho. Her performance in Kho Kho earned her Best Supporting Actress at Kerala Film Critics Award. In 2022, she played Sona in the film Super Sharanya which became a commercial success. Sajin Shrijith of The New Indian Express wrote about her performance, "She has proved already to be an actor with much potential, and she could reach greater heights if she continues to pick sensible scripts."

=== Career breakthrough and rising commercial success (2024 - present) ===
In 2024, she played her first leading role as Reenu in the film Premalu directed by Girish A.D., and it became her breakout role. The film opened to widespread critical acclaim and it currently ranks as one of the highest-grossing Malayalam films of all time. Aswin Devan of The New Indian Express wrote of her performance, "Despite the film featuring a pool of talented actors, Mamitha Baiju stands out as a charmer, effortlessly stealing the show."

Her Tamil debut film was Rebel (2024) starring G. V. Prakash Kumar. The same year she dubbed for Krithi Shetty for ARM. In 2025, she starred opposite Pradeep Ranganathan and R. Sarathkumar in the film Dude (2025). It opened to mixed reviews, earning more than ₹100 crores at the box-office and widespread acclaim for her portrayal. Roopa Radhakrishnan of The Times of India noted "Mamitha is terrific. The actress has dubbed for herself and it has added a sense of authenticity to her character."

Mamitha next starred with Dhanush in Kara (2026). A Gulte.com review noted "Mamitha Baiju is a surprise package. She got a very limited role in the film but she delivered a very good performance in whatever screentime she had." She then starred with Vijay in Jana Nayagan (2026). Aswin Bharadwaj of Lensmen Reviews praised her climax fight sequence, writing that she "cracked the superhero landing pose" and matched Vijay's screen presence.

Mamitha then starred in the romantic family drama film Vishwanath & Sons opposite Suriya directed by Venky Atluri. The film became a commercial success and she received critical acclaim for her performance. Janani K noted of her performance, "Mamitha Baiju's Maddy could easily have been written off as a typical loosu ponnu (immature woman), borderline toxic. Credit to her for making the character loveable instead of annoying. She knows exactly when to let her bubbliness out and when to rein it in." She reunited with director Girish A.D for a third time, starring in the rom-com Bethlehem Kudumba Unit opposite Nivin Pauly. The film received widespread critical acclaim upon release and became the highest-grossing Malayalam film of all time. Santanu Das of Hindustan Times wrote of her performance, "It is Mamitha Baiju who carries the film, her face lighting up the screen. Ashley is such a tricky part to play, given what she chooses to say and what she hides. It is a graceful, understated performance without which the film wouldn't work."

She will reunite with her Premalu co-star Sangeeth Prathap to star in the Malayalam film Hello Dear. In 2026, Mamitha Baiju was announced as the lead actress in the inaugural production of Pradeep Ranganathan's production company, PR Show.

== In the media ==
Mamitha in 2022

At the Telugu success meet for Premalu in March 2024, S. S. Rajamouli praised Mamitha Baiju's performance, predicting that she would emerge as a heartthrob in South cinema. In a 2026 profile, The Hollywood Reporter India described Mamitha as a "pop-culture phenomenon," citing her "likeably awkward charm" on and off camera and her unrehearsed, natural public persona, "free from the trappings of PR-mandated stiffness."

The Hollywood Reporter India noted that reels featuring her routinely resurface on social media feeds long after a film's release, calling her a fixture of "the movie fandom consciousness" of the moment. This online popularity has coincided with her commercial rise. Following the successive box office success of Jana Nayagan, Vishwanath & Sons, and Bethlehem Kudumba Unit in 2026, she became only the third Indian actress, after Deepika Padukone and Alia Bhatt, to star in three films each grossing over ₹200 crore worldwide within a single calendar year.

== Filmography ==
Key
†	Denotes films that have not yet been released

Year	Title	Role	Language	Notes	Ref.
2016	Paavada	Background member of a song sequence	Malayalam	Uncredited; Child artist	
2017	Sarvopari Palakkaran	Raji	Malayalam	Debut film	
2017	Honey Bee 2: Celebrations	Sisily Thambi Antony	Malayalam		
2018	Dakini	Arathy	Malayalam		
2018	Krishnam	Chithra	Malayalam		
2018	Varathan	Sandra	Malayalam		
2018	School Diary	Indu	Malayalam		
2019	An International Local Story	Devika	Malayalam		
2019	Vikruthi	Suhara	Malayalam		
2020	Kilometers and Kilometers	Kochumol	Malayalam		
2021	Operation Java	Alphonsa	Malayalam		
2021	Kho Kho	Anju	Malayalam		
2022	Randu	Kunjumol	Malayalam		
2022	Super Sharanya	Sona "Sona Re" Thomas	Malayalam		
2022	Four	Aswathy	Malayalam		
2023	Pranaya Vilasam	Gopika	Malayalam		
2023	Ramachandra Boss & Co	Sophia	Malayalam		
2024	Premalu	Reenu Roy	Malayalam		
2024	Rebel	Sara Mary John	Tamil		
2025	Dude	Kuralarasi "Kural" Athiyamaan	Tamil		
2026	Kara	Selli	Tamil		
2026	Jana Nayagan	Vijayalakshmi "Viji" Srikanth	Tamil		
2026	Vishwanath & Sons	Madanakameshwari "Maddy Jay" Jothilingam	Tamil		
2026	Bethlehem Kudumba Unit	Ashley Thankachan "Room 17"	Malayalam		
2026	Irandu Vaanam †	Kayal	Tamil	Completed	
2027	Hello Dear †	TBA	Malayalam	Filming	
TBA	PRS01 †	TBA	Tamil	Filming	

=== Short film ===
Year	Title	Role	Language	Notes
2021	Colour Padam	Shalini	Malayalam	

=== Dubbing ===
Year	Film	Dubbed for	Character	Language	Ref.
2024	ARM	Krithi Shetty	Lakshmi	Malayalam	

== Awards and nominations ==
=== Filmfare Awards South ===
Year	Award	Category	Work	Result	Ref
2024	70th Filmfare Awards South	Best Actress - Malayalam	Premalu	Nominated	

=== Kerala Film Critics Association Awards ===
Year	Award	Category	Work	Result	Ref.
2020	Kerala Film Critics Awards	Best Supporting Actress	Kho Kho	Won	

=== South Indian International Movie Awards ===
Year	Award	Category	Work	Result	Ref.
2022	10th South Indian International Movie Awards	SIIMA Award for Best Supporting Actress – Malayalam	Kho Kho	Nominated	
2023	11th South Indian International Movie Awards	SIIMA Award for Best Supporting Actress – Malayalam	Super Sharanya	Nominated	

=== Other Awards and Recognitions ===
Year	Award	Category	Work	Result	Ref.
2024	IIFA Utsavam	Performance in a Supporting Role – Female-Malayalam	Pranaya Vilasam	Won	
2024	Mazhavil Entertainment Awards	The Entertainer of the Year - Upcoming Actor	Premalu	Won	
2024	Mazhavil Entertainment Awards	The Entertainer of the Year (Pair with Naslen)	Premalu	Won	
