= Anaswara Rajan =

Indian actress (born 2002)

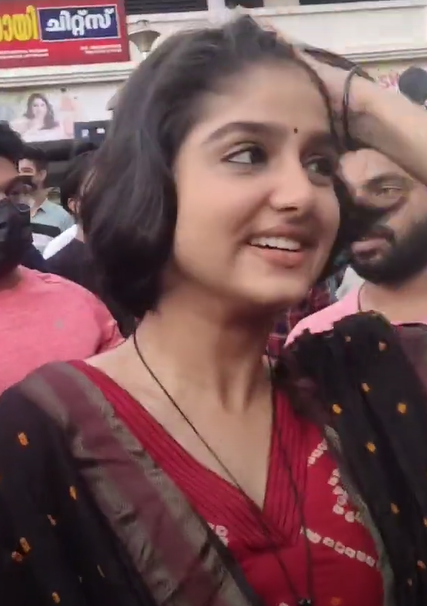
- Anaswara in 2022
- Born: Anaswara Rajan; 8 September 2002 (age 24); Karivellur, Kerala, India
- Occupation: Actress
- Years active: 2017–present

Anaswara Rajan (born 8 September 2002) is an Indian actress who works primarily in Malayalam films alongside Tamil and Telugu films. She debuted as a child artist in Udaharanam Sujatha (2017). Anaswara achieved success following her portrayal of a college student in Super Sharanya (2022) and a blind sculptor in Neru (2023). The latter won her the Filmfare Award for Best Supporting Actress – Malayalam and became her breakthrough. She later appeared in the box office successes such as Abraham Ozler (2024), Guruvayoor Ambalanadayil (2024), Rekhachithram (2025), and With Love (2026).

== Early life ==
Anaswara was born on 8 September 2002 to Rajan and Usha, natives of Karivellur, near Payyanur in Kannur district. She was educated at St. Mary's Girls' High School in Payyanur.

== Career ==
Anaswara made her film acting debut with Udaharanam Sujatha (2017), as Athira, the rebellious daughter of Sujatha, played by Manju Warrier. Anaswara played her first leading role in the film Thanneer Mathan Dinangal (2019). The film, set against the backdrop of a high school that had a heartwarming tale of love, misunderstanding and the struggles of growing up. The film turned out to be a sleeper hit, with Anaswara subsequently gaining fame in the industry. She played a dual role in Adhyarathri (2019) as a daughter and mother.

In 2022, Anaswara played the titular role of an engineering student in Super Sharanya, which emerged a commercial success. Cris of The News Minute stated that she played Sharanya "wonderfully". That year, she made her Tamil debut with the Trisha starrer Raangi.

Anaswara started 2023 with the Tamil film Thugs, alongside Hridhu Haroon. It was an official remake of the Malayalam film Swathanthryam Ardharathriyil. She then made her Hindi film debut with Yaariyan 2, opposite Meezaan Jafri. A critic from Bollywood Hungama wrote, "Anaswara is lovely but goes over the top in emotional scenes." In the same year, Anaswara played a blind sculptor in Neru, starring Mohanlal. Her performance in the film was well acclaimed and regarded as her career best. Janani K of India Today noted, "As Sara, Anaswara exhibits strength, resilience, trauma and skill with the utmost perfection." The film emerged as the eleventh highest grossing Malayalam film of all time.

In 2024, she starred in Guruvayoor Ambalanadayil, alongside Prithviraj Sukumaran, Nikhila Vimal and Basil Joseph. The film went on to become one of the highest grossing films of 2024 in Kerala.

She began 2025 by essaying the titular role in Rekhachithram which emerged as the first Malayalam blockbuster of the year. Vivek Santhosh of Cinema Express wrote "The film's emotional core lies in exploring the life of the victim, played beautifully by Anaswara Rajan, who exudes an old-world charm.

She made her Telugu debut with Champion (2025) co-starring Roshan Meka. In 2026, she appeared in the Tamil romantic comedy film, With Love.

== Filmography ==
Key
†	Denotes films that have not yet been released

Year	Title	Role	Language	Notes	Ref.
2017	Udaharanam Sujatha	Athira Krishnan	Malayalam	Debut film	
2019	Evidey	Shahana	Malayalam		
2019	Thanneer Mathan Dinangal	Keerthy	Malayalam		
2019	My Santa	Adult Isa Elizabeth Jacob	Malayalam	Cameo appearance	
2019	Adhyarathri	Aswathy Ramachandran / Shalini Ramachandran (Note: Anaswara plays dual role)	Malayalam	Dual role	
2021	Vaanku	Rasiya	Malayalam		
2022	Super Sharanya	Sharanya Vasudevan	Malayalam		
2022	Aviyal	Ammukutty	Malayalam		
2022	Mike	Mike / Sara Thomas (Note: Anaswara plays a single character with two or more names)	Malayalam		
2022	Visudha Mejo	Maria	Malayalam	Cameo appearance	
2022	Raangi	Sushmitha	Tamil		
2023	Thugs	Kayal Sivakumar	Tamil		
2023	Yaariyan 2	RJ Ikrooh "Rooh" Awasthi	Hindi		
2023	Pranaya Vilasam	Young Anusree	Malayalam		
2023	Padmini	Monisha	Malayalam	Cameo appearance	
2023	Neru	Sara Mohammed	Malayalam		
2024	Abraham Ozler	Suja Jayadev	Malayalam		
2024	Malayalee from India	Krishna	Malayalam		
2024	Guruvayoor Ambalanadayil	Anjali Sudevan	Malayalam		
2025	Rekhachithram	Rekha Pathrose	Malayalam		
2025	Ennu Swantham Punyalan	Meera	Malayalam		
2025	Painkili	Sheeba Baby	Malayalam		
2025	Mr & Mrs Bachelor	Stephy Immanuel / Anna	Malayalam		
2025	Vyasanasametham Bandhumithradhikal	Anjali	Malayalam		
2025	Champion	Tallapudi Chandrakala	Telugu		
2026	With Love	Monisha	Tamil		
2026	Lucky the Superstar	Keerthi	Tamil	Released on JioHotstar	
2026	Itllu Arjuna	Keerthy	Telugu		
2027	7/G Rainbow Colony 2 †	Kadhir's Wife	Tamil; Telugu	Filming	
2027	Antha Ramuloru Chusukuntaru †	Sirisha	Telugu	Filming	
2027	Kaaka †	Ammulu Paapa	Telugu	Filming	
TBA	Oru Perumgaliyattam †	TBA	Malayalam	Completed	

== Awards and nominations ==
Year	Award	Category	Work	Result	Ref.
2022	11th South Indian International Movie Awards	Best Actress – Malayalam	Super Sharanya	Nominated	
2024	Vanitha Film Awards	Most Popular Actress	Neru	Won	
2024	69th Filmfare Awards South	Best Supporting Actress – Malayalam	Neru	Won	
2024	69th Filmfare Awards South	Best Supporting Actress – Malayalam	Pranaya Vilasam	Nominated	
2024	12th South Indian International Movie Awards	Best Actress – Malayalam	Neru	Won	
2024	IIFA Utsavam	Best Actress – Malayalam	Neru	Won	
2025	49th Kerala Film Critics Association Awards	Best Actress	Rekhachithram, Mr & Mrs Bachelor	Won	
