= Premalu =

Malayalam film directed by Girish A.D in 2024

- Theatrical release poster
- Directed by: Girish A. D.
- Written by: Girish A. D.; Kiran Josey
- Produced by: Fahadh Faasil; Dileesh Pothan; Syam Pushkaran
- Starring: Naslen; Mamitha Baiju; Sangeeth Prathap; Akhila Bhargavan; Shyam Mohan
- Cinematography: Ajmal Sabu
- Edited by: Akash Joseph Varghese
- Music by: Vishnu Vijay
- Production companies: Bhavana Studios; Fahadh Faasil and Friends; Working Class Hero
- Distributed by: Bhavana Release
- Release date: 9 February 2024
- Running time: 156 minutes
- Country: India
- Language: Malayalam
- Budget: ₹9 crore
- Box office: ₹136.25 crore

Premalu (Telugu word; transl. The Loves) is a 2024 Indian Malayalam-language romantic comedy film directed by Girish A. D. and produced by Bhavana Studios, Fahadh Faasil and Friends, and Working Class Hero. The film stars Naslen and Mamitha Baiju, alongside Sangeeth Prathap, Akhila Bhargavan, Shyam Mohan, Meenakshi Raveendran, Mathew Thomas and Althaf Salim. In the film, Sachin Santhosh, a graduate from Kerala, plans to move to UK but instead goes to Hyderabad to take a GATE course, where he meets and falls in love with Reenu Roy, an IT company employee.

The film was officially announced in July 2023 under the tentative title Production No. 5 as it is the fifth production for Bhavana Studios and the official title was announced in December 2023. Principal photography commenced the same month in Thiruvananthapuram. It was shot in Kochi, Hyderabad, Pollachi and wrapped by mid-September 2023. The music was composed by Vishnu Vijay, while cinematography and editing were handled by Ajmal Sabu and Akash Joseph Varghese.

Premalu was released theatrically on February 9, 2024 to critical acclaim from critics. It ranks as one of the highest-grossing Malayalam films of all time and the fourth highest-grossing Malayalam film of 2024. A sequel titled Premalu 2 was in development, but has now been shelved.

== Plot ==
On the final day of college in Salem, Sachin Santosh professes his feelings for his classmate Anjali, but she bluntly rejects his proposal. Sachin moves back to his hometown of Aluva, where he deals with his parents' soured relationship and plans to pursue higher education in the UK. However, his visa application is rejected due to shortage of funds, leaving him with another opportunity to apply after six months. Sachin begins helping with his father's bakery business. One day, he meets his childhood friend Amal Davis, who asks him to accompany him for a GATE course in Hyderabad. Desperate for a change, Sachin agrees and moves to Hyderabad with Amal.

Meanwhile, Reenu Roy, a vivacious young woman from Mallapally, joins the development team of an IT company Ospyn in Hyderabad. Reenu moves in with her friend and colleague Karthika and her friend Niharika. Aadhi, Reenu's arrogant looking and pompous colleague from Mumbai, secretly has a crush on her, but masquerades himself as her "bestie". Sachin and Amal attend the wedding of their professor Shobi, whose bride Shravani is a colleague of Reenu. Sachin is attracted to Reenu from the moment he sees her. Despite engaging in a tiff with Aadhi on their very first meeting, they strike a friendship with Reenu and Karthika. After the wedding, Reenu and Karthika decide to go back to Hyderabad with Sachin and Amal in their Mini Cooper though Aadhi initially disagrees. Sachin, who had planned to quit his course and take up a job in Chennai, decides to stay back for Reenu and persuades Amal to get him a job at his aunt Mary's fast-food restaurant.

Sachin and Amal move into Reenu and Karthika's neighbourhood and invite them over for a party at a pub. At the party, Amal tells Karthika about Sachin's feelings for Reenu, but Karthika dissuades them, saying that Reenu is looking for an accomplished and mature person and that she will definitely reject someone like Sachin, who does not have any concrete plans or career. Sachin decides not to disclose his feelings to Reenu. They continue to become closer after a few events, including a train journey and an excursion in Hyderabad, which angers Aadhi. Sachin ultimately confesses his feelings to Reenu, but she rejects him and inadvertently hurts him by saying that this is not his first rejection. A heartbroken Sachin moves to Chennai and takes up odd jobs to make ends meet, while ignoring Reenu's calls and messages. At the same time, Karthika shifts to Bangalore to marry and be with her fiancé Vikas. Reenu, who feels now alone realises her mistake done to Sachin and begins to understand her true feelings for him and misses him.

After few days, Sachin and Amal attend Karthika's pre-wedding party where they meet Reenu. Sachin pretends to have moved on and tells her about his UK visa approval and his scheduled flight to UK the very next day. Aadhi suddenly confronts Sachin and Amal. Being tipsy and tired of Aadhi's insinuations, Sachin and Amal disparage Aadhi and assert that Reenu will also reject him. Overconfident, Aadhi publicly proposes to Reenu, but she unhesitatingly rejects him, resulting in further taunts from them. A humiliated Aadhi swears vengeance and leaves. Sachin, still detached to Reenu's sincere attempts, passes out drunk at the party with Amal.

The next morning, Sachin and Amal depart for the airport and Reenu joins them. On the way, Aadhi chases them along with few thugs. Amidst the tension, Reenu tells Sachin that she misses him and does not want him to leave. She finally confesses her feelings for Sachin, which makes him happy. Aadhi and the thugs interrupt the moment and begins to beat Sachin and Amal. However, Reenu averts the assault using a pepper spray that Aadhi himself had given her for self-defense. They escape and arrive at the airport on time. Reenu and Sachin hug and bid farewell to each other and commit to a long-distance relationship.

The movie then cuts to something that happened a couple of months ago. Reenu, Karthika and Niharika are drinking on the rooftop of their shared apartment. Niharika tosses an empty can off the roof, foretelling that Reenu will marry whoever the can lands on. Hearing an old man curse in anger, they flee. However, the can is shown to have actually fallen on a drunk Sachin, who along with Amal, staggers off, kicking the can.

== Cast ==
- Naslen as Sachin Santhosh
- Mamitha Baiju as Reenu Roy, Sachin's love interest
- Shyam Mohan as Adithyan R Krishnan (Aadhi), Reenu's officemate and bestie
- Sangeeth Prathap as Amal Davis, Sachin's best friend
- Akhila Bhargavan as Karthika, Reenu's best friend
- Meenakshi Raveendran as Niharika a.k.a. "Wanderlust", Karthika's roommate
- Althaf Salim as Shobhi Sir, Tutor of Sachin in GATE Coaching Centre
- Shameer Khan as Subin
- George Wincent as Vaisakh Murali
- Ranjith Narayan Kurup as Thomas' manager
- K.S. Prasad as Sachin's father
- Priya Sreejith as Beena Teacher, Sachin's mother
- Gopu Kesav as Reenu's father
- Ranjini George as Reenu's mother
- Suparna S as Anjali, Sachin's ex-love interest
- Ayana Babu as Savitha Santhosh, Sachin's sister
- Dileep Mohan as Jain, Sachin's friend
- Mathew Thomas as Thomas, Amal's cousin (extended cameo appearance)
- Syam Pushkaran as Pambavasan, Aadhi's friend and aid (cameo appearance)

== Production ==
=== Development ===
On 4 July 2023, Girish A. D. announced that he would collaborate with Naslen and Mamitha Baiju for his directorial after I Am Kathalan, which also features Naslen in the lead role, making his third collaboration with the actor. Tentatively titled Production No. 5, the project would mark as the fifth production for Bhavana Studios; they would fund it in association with Fahadh Faasil and Friends and Working Class Hero. The film's official title, Premalu, was announced on 1 December 2023.

=== Filming ===
Principal photography began with the first schedule on 9 July 2023 with an inaugural puja ceremony at Thiruvananthapuram in Kerala. The project was expected to be shot with a span of 75-days across Kochi, Hyderabad, and Pollachi. Filming wrapped by 15 September.

== Music ==
The film's musical score and songs are composed by Vishnu Vijay. The track "Ya Ya Ya Yadava" by K. S. Chithra and P. Unnikrishnan from the 1996 film Devaraagam, which was originally composed by M. M. Keeravani, was reused in the film to subsequently become a rage upon the film's release. Veteran K. G. Markose rendered a song titled "Telangana Bommalu" after a brief hiatus from films.

== Release ==
=== Theatrical ===
Premalu was theatrically released on 9 February 2024. A Telugu dubbed version was released on 8 March and a Tamil dub followed a week later.

It was released by Bhavana Release in Kerala. Overseas rights acquired by Phars Film Co and Yash Raj Films. It was distributed across Andhra Pradesh and Telangana by Sri Venkateswara Creations, Annapurna Studios and Showing Business. In Tamil Nadu, the distribution rights were acquired by Red Giant Movies.

=== Home media ===
The digital streaming rights were acquired by Disney+ Hotstar and the satellite rights were acquired by Asianet for Malayalam and by Star Network for other languages. The film had its digital premiere on the streaming platform from 12 April 2024. That same day, the Telugu dub premiered on Aha. Premalu is also available to stream in Tamil and Hindi on Disney+ Hotstar. From August 2026, the film has been temporarily removed from Disney+ Hotstar ahead of release of the Hindi remake Prem Keetanu.

== Reception ==
=== Critical response ===
Premalu received positive reviews from critics.

Nikhil Sebastian of Pinkvilla gave 4/5 stars and wrote "Premalu undoubtedly marks Girish AD's finest work since Thanneer Mathan Dinangal. If you're looking to escape from the stresses of life for two and a half hours and immerse yourself in laughter and enjoyment, then look no further—booking a ticket for Premalu is the perfect choice".

Anandu Suresh of The Indian Express gave 3.5/5 stars and wrote "Similar to Girish AD's Thanneer Mathan Dinangal and Super Sharanya, this Naslen, Mamitha Baiju-starrer too effectively employs situational and observational comedy. Yet, Girish ensures that Premalu stands apart from his previous works." Gayathri Krishna of OTTplay gave 3.5/5 stars and wrote "Naslen and Mamitha Baiju-starrer Premalu serves as a decent romantic comedy, which makes it watchable again, much like Girish AD's earlier films".

S. R. Praveen of The Hindu wrote "Though Thanneer Mathan.. was quite a winning debut for Girish, Super Sharanya was only half as satisfying. He has upped the game in his third outing, as Premalu is a winner with its fresh, humorous treatment of a run-of-the-mill story." Aswin Devan of The New Indian Express wrote "The distinctive style we have seen in Girish's previous films like Thanneermathan Dinangal and Super Sharanya, is all the more pronounced in Premalu".

=== Box office ===
Premalu has grossed over ₹93.65 crore in India (₹62.75 crore from Kerala) and a further ₹42.25 crore overseas, for a worldwide total of ₹136.25 crore. The film collected ₹62.75 crore from the home state of Kerala and is among highest-grossing film at the Kerala boxoffice. Premalu also secured a spot in the top 10 list of highest grossing Malayalam films in the overseas market, Rest of India and worldwide.

== Accolades ==
| Year | Award | Category | Recipient(s) |
|---|---|---|---|
| 2024 | Kerala State Film Awards | Best Film with Popular Appeal and Aesthetic Value | Fahadh Faasil, Dileesh Pothan, Syam Pushkaran |

== Sequel ==
On 19 April 2024, a sequel titled Premalu 2 was announced. The shooting for the film was scheduled to begin by the mid of June 2025 with the film planned to release during Christmas 2025, but filming was postponed to 2026 and has now been shelved.

== Remake ==
The Hindi remake of the film titled Prem Keetanu is released on 2 October 2026.
