= Sajin Cherukayil =

Indian actor and scriptwriter

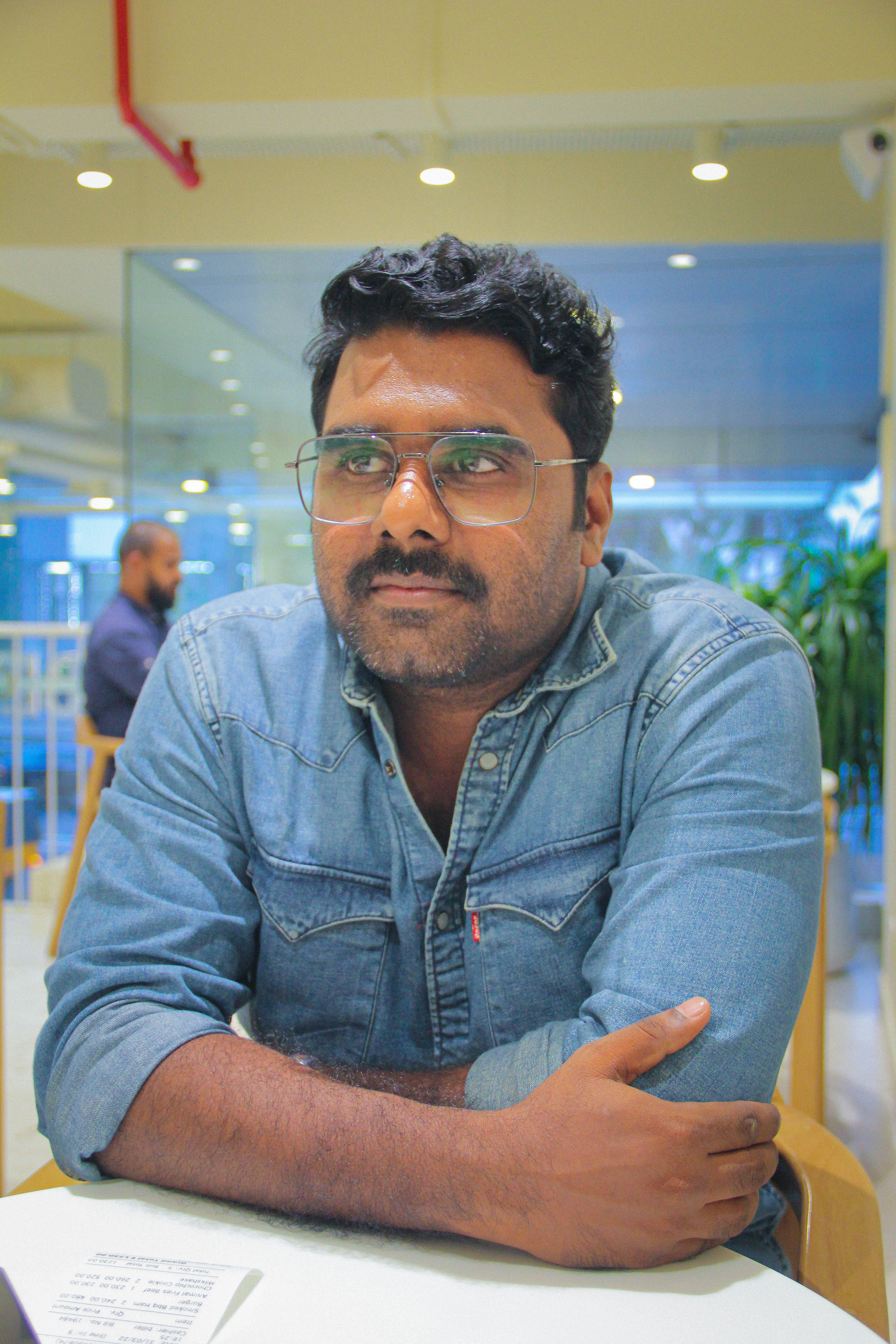
- Born: Kerala, India
- Occupations: Actor; screenwriter
- Years active: 2017–present

Sajin Cherukayil is an Indian actor and scriptwriter who primarily works in Malayalam films. He has been associated with popular films such as Super Sharanya, Thinkalazhcha Nishchayam, Allu Ramendran, and Thanneermathan Dinangal.

== Filmography ==
=== Films ===
Year	Title	Credited as		Notes
Year	Title	Actor	Writer	Notes
2017	Porattam	Yes	No	
2018	Lilli	Yes	No	
2019	Thanneer Mathan Dinangal	Yes	No	
2019	Allu Ramendran	No	Yes	Co-written by Vineeth Vasudevan, Girish A.D
2019	Kamala	Yes	No	
2022	Super Sharanya	Yes	No	
2022	1744 White Alto	Yes	No	
2023	Poovan	Yes	No	
2023	B 32 Muthal 44 Vare	Yes	No	
2023	Neeraja	Yes	No	
2023	Nalla Nilavulla Rathri	Yes	No	
2023	Padmini	Yes	No	
2023	Jaladhara Pumpset Since 1962	Yes	No	
2023	Kannur Squad	Yes	No	Sreekumar
2024	Kattis Gang	Yes	No	
2024	Swakaryam Sambhava Bahulam	Yes	No	
2024	I Am Kathalan	Yes	Yes	Directed by Girish A.D
2024	Swargam	Yes	No	
2024	Extra Decent	Yes	No	
2025	Paranu Paranu Paranu Chellan	Yes	No	
2025	Raveendra Nee Evide?	Yes	No	
2025	Sahasam	Yes	No	
2026	Maharaja Hostel	Yes	No	
2026	Avaraachan & Sons	Yes	No	
2026	Bouma	Yes	No	

=== Short films ===
Film	Year	Notes	Language	Director
Yashpal	2017	Actor	Malayalam	Girish A.D
Mookuthi	2018	Actor	Malayalam	Girish A.D
Peru Gayathri	2019	Actor	Malayalam	Varun Dhara
Bineeshettan Roommate	2020	Actor	Malayalam	Kiran Josey
