= Super Sharanya =

2022 film by Girish A.D.

- Theatrical release poster
- Directed by: Girish A. D.
- Written by: Girish A. D.
- Produced by: Shebin Backer; Girish A. D.
- Starring: Anaswara Rajan; Mamitha Baiju; Devika Gopal Nair; Rosna Joshi
- Narrated by: Anaswara Rajan
- Cinematography: Sajith Purushan
- Edited by: Akash Joseph Varghese
- Music by: Justin Varghese
- Production companies: Shebin Backer Productions; Stuck Cows
- Distributed by: Central Pictures
- Release date: 7 January 2022
- Running time: 164 minutes
- Country: India
- Language: Malayalam
- Box office: ₹23 crore (US$2.4 million)

Super Sharanya is a 2022 Indian Malayalam-language coming-of-age romantic comedy film written and directed by Girish A. D. The film stars Anaswara Rajan in the titular role, while Mamitha Baiju, Rosna Joshi, Devika Gopal Nair, Vineeth Vishwam, Arjun Ashokan and Naslen play supporting roles. The film was produced by Shebin Backer and Girish A. D. and the music is composed by Justin Varghese.

Super Sharanya was released on 7 January 2022 and became a commercial success despite receiving mixed reviews from critics.

== Plot ==
Sharanya Vasudevan has moved from her small town in Palakkad district and is a student in an engineering college in Thrissur city. Her friends are her roommates Sona Thomas, Sherin and Devika. Sharanya is an anxious and insecure individual who tries to avoid any anxiety inducing situation. She endures her college seniors ragging and has to deal with the unwanted affections of multiple men. These include an annoying senior, Ajith Menon, an inappropriate professor, Arun Raj and a shy classmate Sangeeth. She constantly tries to avoid the first two and maintains a platonic friendship with Sangeeth. Ajith is a violent, temperamental and feared senior who is much older than most of the other students. One day he confronts and proposes marriage to Sharanya. However, she is unable to refuse him immediately due to her fear of him and tells him to give her a 6-month time to think about her answer. Similarly, the professor writes a love letter to her and proposes to her in the middle of an assignment checking. She refuses him. Arun tries to make life difficult for Sharanya by grading her work harshly and even failing her.

On one of their previous outings in Ernakulam, Sharanya and her friends had literally bumped into a young man named Deepu. While Sona and Deepu argue with each other, he gets immediately attracted to Sharanya. Later, he tracks her down via Instagram hashtags and sends her a friend request. Deepu, his friend Varun and brother-in-law Abhilash run a fried goods business. Sharanya eventually accepts his request and they soon start chatting online regularly. Sona is not in favor of this friendship and tries to dissuade her. However, Sharanya and Deepu become closer and meet up at a wedding where she accepts his proposal for a romantic relationship. Though Sharanya and Deepu’s relationship includes multiple arguments, they stay together.

Ajith, who now is impatient for an answer, beats up Sangeeth thinking that he is the reason for Sharanya's hesitation. Arun gets accidentally electrocuted while trying to make things difficult for Sharanya during a lab exam. Deepu, who has an unsavory past, is able to help Sharanya get rid of Ajith by beating him up. Sharanya is unhappy with Deepu resorting to violence. Sharanya decides to breakup with Deepu but upon meeting him, changes her mind. Her best friend, Sona, who had accompanied her for support, walks in on the couple hugging and expresses her surprise that Sharanya did not follow through on breaking up. Deepu threatens to beat Sona up so badly that her face would be unrecognizable if she continues to interfere in their relationship. Sharanya wordlessly supports Deepu, as Sona retreats in fear. Sharanya and Deepu embrace. Sharanya reflects that she still has much to learn about Deepu and that he lies too much.

== Cast ==
- Anaswara Rajan as "Super" Sharanya Vasudevan (Shaaru)
- Mamitha Baiju as Sona "Sona Re" Thomas
- Rosna Joshi as Sherin
- Devika Gopal Nair as Devika
- Vineeth Vishwam as Assistant Professor Arun Raj
- Naslen as Sangeeth
- Arjun Ashokan as Deepak
- Sajin Cherukayil as Abhilash Kumar, Deepu's brother-in-law
- Vineeth Vasudevan as Ajith Menon(Spoof of Arjun Reddy)
- Varun Dhara as Varun
- Antony Varghese as Sumesh (cameo appearance)
- Manikandan Pattambi as Vasudevan, Sharanya's father
- Bindu Panicker as Deepu's mother
- Kani Kusruti (cameo appearance)
- Sneha Babu as Deepthi, Deepu's sister
- Sanath Sivaraj as Sudhi
- Jimmy Danny as Jimmy, canteen owner
- Aravind E. Haridas as Sanju
- Keerthana Sreekumar as Senior College Student
- Dileep Sasidharan as Patti Vinu
- Sreekanth Vettiyar as Justin
- Sangeeth Prathap as Delso
- Parvathy Ayyappadas as Navya
- Aishwarya Rajan as Anu miss

== Production ==
Super Sharanya was announced in August 2020 as Gireesh A. D.'s second directorial after Thanneer Mathan Dinangal with Anaswara Rajan, Arjun Ashokan, Mamitha Baiju and Naslen K. Gafoor in lead roles. Kunchacko Boban shared the first look character posters of the film. A second-look poster has been revealed by the filmmakers, announcing the January 2022 release of the film in theatres. Shebin Backer is producing the film, which is co-produced by Girish A. D.. Sajith Purushan did the cinematography, while Akash Joseph Vargheese did the editing. Justin Varghese, who was also the composer of Thanneer Mathan Dinangal composed the music. The film's production was stated to begin in April 2020 but instead started in December 2020 due to the Covid outbreak. The film was shot in Palakkad, Ernakulam and Thrissur.

== Music ==
Track listings
| No. | Title | Lyrics | Singer(s) | Length |
|---|---|---|---|---|
| 1. | "Ashubha Mangalakaari" | Suhail Koya | Sarath Chettanpady, J'mymah & Meera Johny | 5:18 |
| 2. | "Shaaru Shaaru" | Suhail Koya | Meera Johny, Justin Varghese & Hafsath Abdussalam K P | 3:53 |
| 3. | "Shaaru In Town" | Suhail Koya | Suhail Koya | 2:21 |
| 4. | "Pacha Paayal" | Suhail Koya | Catherine Francis, Christin Jos, Maria Francis | 5:09 |
| 5. | "Kannalambili" | Suhail Koya | Justin Varghese | 1:07 |

== Release ==
The film was released on 7 January 2022.

== Reception ==
=== Critical response ===
Anna Mathews of The Times of India gave 3 out of 5 stars and wrote "Super Sharanya isn't a very meaningful film that will move or stir you, but if you are in the mood for light entertainment, this can be fun to watch particularly with friends." Goutham V. S. of The Indian Express wrote "A few narrative flourishes notwithstanding, the film tells the same love story all over again. It never explains its title either." Cris of The News Minute wrote "Girish AD's second film is not as adorable as his first, Thanneer Mathan Dinangal, but it ticks a lot of boxes."

Sajin Shrijith of The New Indian Express gave 3.5 out of 5 stars and wrote "Unlike in Thanneer Mathan Dinangal, the female characters manage to outshine the boys this time around." S. R. Praveen of The Hindu wrote "The typical old-school romantic drama is partly enjoyable, but misses the spark or sensibility that marked director Girish's debut film." Ajish Jimmy George of Onmanorama wrote "Each character in Super Sharanya leaves a mark and the story flows without drag for the entire two hours and forty minutes. This one is definitely a major improvement over Thanneer Mathan Dinangal."
