= I Am Kathalan =

2024 Indian film by Girish A. D.

- Theatrical release poster
- Directed by: Girish A. D.
- Written by: Sajin Cherukayil
- Produced by: Gokulam Gopalan; Dr. Paul Varghese; Krishnamoorthy
- Starring: Naslen; Anishma Anilkumar; Lijomol Jose; Dileesh Pothan
- Cinematography: Sharan Velayudhan
- Edited by: Akash Joseph Varghese
- Music by: Sidhartha Pradeep
- Production companies: Dr. Pauls Entertainment; Sree Gokulam Movies; Hitmakers Entertainments
- Distributed by: Dream Big Films (India); Phars Film (overseas)
- Release date: 7 November 2024
- Running time: 111 minutes
- Country: India
- Language: Malayalam

I Am Kathalan (transl. I Am Mr Lover) is a 2024 Indian Malayalam-language cyber thriller film directed by Girish A. D. and written by Sajin Cherukayil. The film features Naslen, Anishma Anilkumar, Lijomol Jose and Dileesh Pothan.

The film was officially announced on 24 November 2022. Principal photography commenced on 29 December 2022, in Irinjalakuda, Thrissur, Kerala. The film showcases music and original background score by Sidhartha Pradeep.

I Am Kathalan released in theatres on 7 November 2024. It received mixed reviews from audiences and was an average success at the box office.

== Plot ==
Unable to find employment after graduating due to his backlogs and less-than-impressive projects, Vishnu is at a crossroads in his love life after his girlfriend Shilpa decides to move on, as she can't imagine a life with someone who has nothing going for him. After an encounter with her dad Chacko leaves him humiliated, Vishnu vows to take revenge on Chacko's chit-fund company, using his cyber skills under the name of Kathalan ("lover" in Tamil). He hacks their server several times, leaving them with financial losses. Things turn complicated when an ethical hacker named Simi enters and helps Chacko to find Kathalan, the masked hacker. Shilpa ends up marrying an accountant in her father's company and he decides to taunt Vishnu so that they can somehow catch up but Vishnu covers his tracks so well that he is never caught for his cyber hacking crimes. Vishnu's father finally gifts him with a laptop and just asks him to "do good" with it and the movie ends with a twist that you wouldn't expect as he interviews with Simi.

== Cast ==
- Naslen as Vishnu Suresh (Kathalan)
- Anishma Anilkumar as Shilpa Periyadan
- Lijomol Jose as Simi
- Dileesh Pothan as Chacko Periyadan
- Vineeth Vasudevan as Mathew Thomas
- Sajin Cherukayil as Praveen Kumar
- Vineeth Vishwam as Aneesh
- Arshad Ali as Udayan
- Kiran Josey as Jills
- Zhinz Shan as Vishnu's father
- Kavitha as Vishnu's mother
- Saran Panicker
- Arjun K.
- Sanath Sivaraj
- T. G. Ravi as Mathematics professor

== Production ==
=== Development ===
This film marks Girish A. D.'s fourth directorial project. On 24 November 2022, he revealed his collaboration with Naslen and writer Sajin Cherukayil with a title poster. Produced by Dr. Paul Varghese and Krishnamoorthy under the banner of Dr. Paul Entertainment, the film is also co-produced by Tinu Thomas. Cinematographer Sharan Velayudhan handled the cinematography, while the editing was done by Akash Joseph Varghese.

=== Casting ===
Following the success of Premalu, Naslen reunited with Girish A. D. for their next project. The team has announced that Lijomol Jose, Dileesh Pothan, and Anshima Anilkumar will join the cast, with Anshima Anilkumar, who acted in Poovan, taking on the female lead role. The film will also feature Sajin Cherukayil, Vineeth Vasudevan, Vineeth Viswam, Arshad Ali, and Arshad in key roles. Additionally, the director revealed that the film will introduce some newcomers.

=== Filming ===
The principal photography commenced on 9 November 2022, with a puja ceremony. The shoot spanned more than 35 days, concluding on 20 December 2022. Filming occurred in and around Irinjalakuda, Thrissur.

== Music ==
The music and original background score was composed by Sidhartha Pradeep, who has earlier worked in Manhole (2016) and Kho Kho (2021). The music rights of the film were bagged by Think Music.

== Release ==
The film released on 7 November 2024. The film was released on manoramaMAX OTT platform on 17 January 2025.

== Reception ==
=== Critical response ===
Anjana George of The Times of India gave the film 3/5 stars and wrote, "Overall, I Am Kathalan offers a fresh, serious take on the genre, but its slow pace and focus on emotional depth may not engage all viewers".
