= Girish A. D. =

Indian film director and screenwriter

- Born: Chalakudy, Kerala, India
- Occupations: Film director; Screenwriter; Actor; Film producer
- Years active: 2017–present
- Notable work: Premalu (2024); Bethlehem Kudumba Unit (2026); Super Sharanya (2022)
- Spouse: Chippy Viswan (m. 2019)

Girish A. D. is an Indian film director, screenwriter, actor and film producer who works primarily in Malayalam cinema. He is known for directing films in the romantic comedy genre. His notable films include Thanneer Mathan Dinangal (2019), Premalu (2024), and Bethlehem Kudumba Unit (2026).

== Early and personal life ==
Girish A. D. was born in Chalakudy,Thrissur, Kerala, to Dineshan and Geetha. He attended his higher secondary in St. Sebastians HSS, Kuttikkad, Chalakudy. He did his Bachelor of Technology in MET's School of Engineering, Mala, Kerala,Thrissur. Girish is married to Chippy Viswan since 23 June 2019.

== Career ==
After graduating, Girish started making short films. Yashpal, Vishuddha Ambrose and Mookutthi were his early works, all of which got critical acclaim and viewership. He bagged the best Director Award in Adoor short film festival 2017 for Vishuddha Ambrose.

After briefly appearing in Bilahari K Raj's 2017 independent film 'Porattam', Girish debuted as a writer in Malayalam film industry in 2018 with Allu Ramendran directed by Bilahari K Raj. The following year, he made his directorial debut with Thanneer Mathan Dinangal (transl. Watermelon Days). The film being a coming-of age romantic comedy co-written by Dinoy Poulose, was jointly produced by Plan J Studios and Shebin Backer Productions. It starred Vineeth Sreenivasan, Mathew Thomas, and Anaswara Rajan in the lead roles. In 2022, Girish's second directorial Super Sharanya got released and met with mixed reviews from critics but was a commercial success. Then he directed two films, Premalu and I Am Kathalan and both got released in 2024. Premalu received highly positive response and became one of the highest grossing Malayalam films of 2024. I Am Kathalan met with mixed reviews from critics. His next film was released in 2026, Bethlehem Kudumba Unit starring Nivin Pauly and Mamitha Baiju in lead roles. The film received highly positive reviews and became the highest grossing Malayalam film of all time.

== Filmography ==
=== As film director ===
Year	Title	Notes
2019	Thanneer Mathan Dinangal	
2022	Super Sharanya	
2024	Premalu	
2024	I Am Kathalan	
2026	Bethlehem Kudumba Unit	

=== Other crew positions ===
Year	Title	Credited as			Notes
Year	Title	Writer	Producer	Actor	Notes
2017	Porattam	No	No	Yes	
2019	Allu Ramendran	Yes	No	No	
2022	Archana 31 Not Out	No	No	Yes	
2022	Poovan	No	Yes	Yes	
2026	Balan: The Boy	No	No	Yes	

=== Short films ===
Film	Role
Yashpal	Director
Vishudda Ambrosse	Director
Mookuthi	Director
Edangeru	Actor
Peru Gayathri	Actor
Vasheekaranam	Actor, writer
Anurag Engineering Works	Producer
Soulmates - Oru Saathukkudi Pranayam	Director
