= Arjun Ashokan =

Indian actor

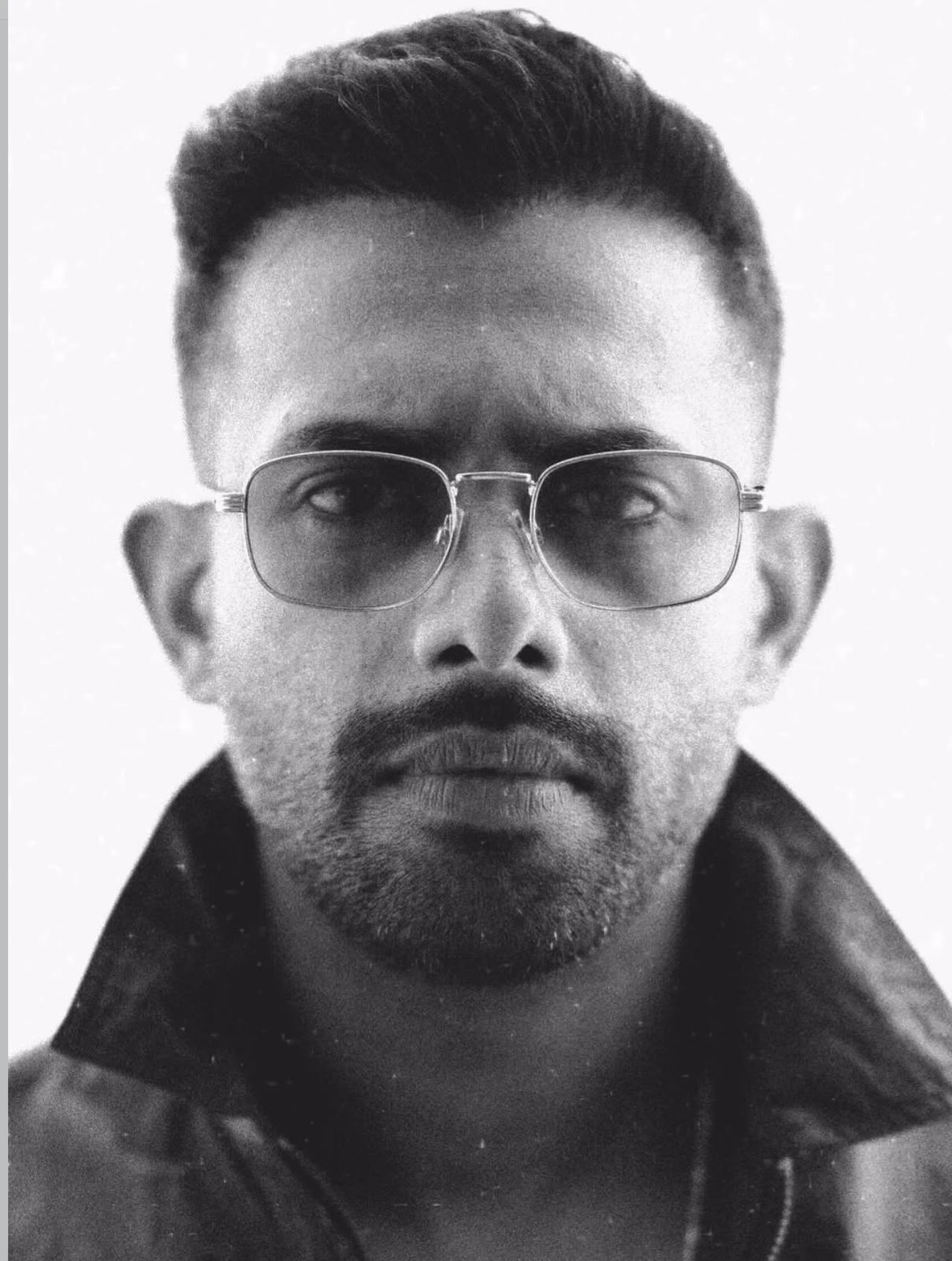
- Ashokan in 2026
- Born: 24 August 1993 (age 33)
- Occupation: Actor
- Years active: 2012–present
- Spouse: Nikhita Ganesh
- Father: Harisree Ashokan

Arjun Ashokan (24 August 1993) is an Indian actor working in the Malayalam film industry. He is the son of the actor Harisree Ashokan. His notable performances include Parava, B. Tech, June, Varathan, Unda, Super Sharanya, Pranaya Vilasam, Romancham (both 2023) and Bramayugam (2024).

== Career ==
Making his debut with Orkut Oru Ormakoot, along with a group of newcomers, Arjun first made a mark with Parava, the debut directorial of Soubin Shahir, and later with B. Tech and the sleeper hit June.

== Personal life ==
He married Nikhita Ganesh in 2018. The couple have a daughter.

== Filmography ==
Key
†	Denotes films that have not yet been released

- All films are in Malayalam language unless otherwise noted.

Year	Title	Role(s)	Notes and Ref.
2012	Orkut Oru Ormakoot	Ganeshan	Debut film
2014	To Let Ambadi Talkies	Anthony	
2017	Parava	Hakeem	
2018	Varathan	Johnny	
2018	B.Tech	Azad	
2018	Mandharam	Renjith	
2019	Stand Up	Sujith	
2019	Under World	Frog catcher	
2019	Ambili	Man at beach	
2019	Unda	PC Gireesh T. P	
2019	An International Local Story	Photographer	
2019	June	Anand	
2020	Trance	Paul	
2021	Wolf	Sanjay	
2021	Jan.E.Man	Sambath	
2021	Madhuram	Kevin	
2021	Ajagajantharam	Kannan	
2021	Sumesh and Ramesh	Jithu	
2022	Super Sharanya	Deepu	
2022	Member Rameshan 9am Ward	O.M.Rameshan	
2022	Kaduva	Victor	
2022	Malayankunju	Deepu	
2022	Thattassery Koottam	Sanju	
2023	Romancham	Sinu	
2023	Pranaya Vilasam	Suraj	
2023	Thuramukham	Hamza	
2023	Khali Purse of Billionaires	Abhi	
2023	Thrishanku	Sethu	
2023	Theeppori Benny	Benny	
2023	Chaaver	Arun	
2023	Otta	Ben	
2024	Abraham Ozler	Vineeth	
2024	Bramayugam	Thevan	
2024	Once Upon a Time in Kochi	CI Anand Das	
2024	Pallotty 90's Kids	Unni	
2024	Anand Sreebala	Anand Sreebala	
2025	Ennu Swantham Punyalan	Antappan	
2025	Anpodu Kanmani	Nakulan	
2025	Bromance	Shabeer	
2025	Abhilasham	Thaju	
2025	Thudarum	Wedding Guest	Guest appearance
2025	Nancy Rani	Director Raj	
2025	Sumathi Valavu	Appu	
2025	Thalavara	Jyothish	
2025	Khajuraho Dreams	Gautham	
2026	Chatha Pacha	Savio "Loco" Lobo	
2026	Kadhal Reset Repeat	Arri	Tamil debut
2026	Varavu	Willy	
2026	Disco	Chiyar Ashokan	
2026	Melcow Pondicherry	Melvi	
2026	Bro Code †	TBA	Tamil film
2026	Boney M †	TBA	
