= Koon (film) =

Indian thriller film

- Directed by: Prasanth B Molickal
- Written by: Amal Mohan
- Produced by: Anilkumar Nambiar
- Starring: Limal G Paadath; Sithara Vijayan; Lekshmika Sajeevan
- Cinematography: Tojo Thomas
- Edited by: Sunil Krishna
- Music by: Ajith Mathew
- Production company: Golden Trumpet Entertainments
- Release date: 4 October 2024
- Country: India
- Language: Malayalam

Koon is a 2024 Indian Malayalam-language thriller film written by Amal Mohan and directed by Prasanth B Molickal. It stars Limal G Paadath, Sithara Vijayan and Lekshmika Sajeevan in the lead roles.

== Plot ==
The film follows Aparna, a working woman who is abducted by Mathew, a man intent on forcing her into a relationship. During her struggle to escape, she learns about Mathew's past traumas, which have shaped his behavior.

== Cast ==
- Limal G Paadath as Mathew
- Sithara Vijayans as Aparna
- Lakshmika Sajeevan as Lady Police Officer
- Giridhar Krishna as Civil Police Officer
- Amaya Ashok as Captive
- Mareesa Jose as Friend
- Anjana Maria as Friend
- Anilkumar Nambiar as Uber Driver
- Chithra Prasanth as Doctor
- CP Sunil as Civil Police Officer

== Production ==
The project was first announced on 13 July 2021 after the relaxation of COVID-19 restrictions. The lead actors were selected through auditions. The first single, "Parayuvaan Ariyathe...", composed by Ajith Mathew, was released on 20 September 2024.

== Significance ==
Koon was the final film appearance of actress Lakshmika Sajeevan, who died of a cardiac arrest at the age of 24 in August 2024.
