= Suresh Krishna =

Suresh Krishna may refer to:

- Suresh Krishna (actor), Malayalam film actor
- Suresh Krishna (businessman) (born 1936), chairman and managing director of Sundram Fasteners Limited
- Suresh Krissna, Tamil film director
