= Thanneer Mathan Dinangal =

2019 film by Girish A. D

- Theatrical release poster
- Directed by: Girish A.D.
- Written by: Girish A.D.; Dinoy Paulose
- Produced by: Jomon T. John; Shebin Backer; Shameer Muhammed
- Starring: Anaswara Rajan; Mathew Thomas; Vineeth Sreenivasan; Naslen
- Cinematography: Vinod Illampilly; Jomon T. John
- Edited by: Shameer Muhammed
- Music by: Justin Varghese
- Production companies: Mannat Studios; Shebin Backer Productions
- Distributed by: Central Pictures
- Release date: 26 July 2019
- Running time: 136 minutes
- Country: India
- Language: Malayalam
- Budget: ₹2 crore
- Box office: ₹50 crore

Thanneer Mathan Dinangal (transl. Watermelon Days) is a 2019 Indian Malayalam-language coming-of-age comedy-drama film co-written and directed by Girish A.D (in his directorial debut) and jointly produced by Jomon T. John, Shebin Backer, and Shameer Muhammed. The film stars Anaswara Rajan, Vineeth Sreenivasan, Mathew Thomas, and Naslen. The music was composed by Justin Varghese. The film follows Jaison, a teenager, who has a crush on Keerthy, but she does not reciprocate his feelings. To make things worse, he gets in trouble with Ravi, the new teacher who is liked by everyone, especially Keerthy.

The film was released on 26 July 2019 and was met with a positive critical response and performed well at the box office too, becoming the fourth-highest-grossing Malayalam film of the year.

== Plot ==
The film follows the life of a cynical yet honest eleventh-grade student Jaison. He changes to the science batch from humanities as he is very ambitious and aims to be the best in his class. However, after failing ridiculously in a class test, he becomes clear that ambition alone was not enough. He maintains a social circle around him through being a regular at a juice and snack shop with his batch-mates. Meanwhile, he starts to have a crush on his classmate Keerthy, who does not reciprocate his feelings. This makes him extremely aggravated and annoyed.

A new Malayalam teacher, Ravi Padmanabhan joins the school. During their first class, Jaison rubs him up the wrong way. This does not sit very well with Ravi who is both a narcissist and someone who loves attention. Hence, Ravi often snubs Jaison. Ravi's influence on everyone irritates Jaison and he openly complains about Ravi being a fraud. They enter the twelfth grade. To forget Keerthy he woos Stephy a new eleventh-grade student. He calls her frequently but realizes that it is not working. He later breaks up with Stephy and realizes that Keerthy is his love. This meanwhile had enraged Basil another student at the school who wanted to woo Stephy as well, therefore, getting into a fight with Jaison for her. Jaison in his own way finally woos Keerthy and she reciprocates his feelings. Ravi finds out their relationship and calls in Jaison. Ravi says that he knows that Jaison does not like him and is speaking ill of him. Hence, he would make Jaison's life harder at school. Ravi is then suddenly called into Principal's office. He is revealed to be a fake teacher with fake qualifications. Ravi is chased around the school grounds by the police and finally caught. Jaison does not wait in celebrating his victory over Ravi.

Meanwhile, Keerthy is caught by her mother talking to Jaison. She is mercilessly grounded by her parents. She manages to call Jaison and tells that she is going to Chennai for her studies and asks him to meet her the next day after the exam. After disconnecting the call Jaison is threatened by Basil. This provokes Jaison so he and his friends beat him up. The next day he fails to meet Keerthy as he is called by the principal for the problem he had created. But he does manage to catch Keerthy's bus, he then grabs her and they run away. Jaison urges Keerthy to elope, but she says that's not possible as it's not realistic to deal with the problem and promises that she will never leave him. Keerthy goes to Chennai.

A few months later, Jaison and his friends are at the temple. It is revealed that Keerthy is set to return from Chennai. Jaison wonders who may have stolen Keerthy's power bank, which went missing during a class trip. It is then revealed that it was Ravi who stole it, and he is seen teaching in a Kannada school in a new makeover and with more prowess than he displayed at Jaison's school.

== Cast ==
- Anaswara Rajan as Keerthy
- Mathew Thomas as Jaison, Keerthy's love interest
- Vineeth Sreenivasan as Ravi Padmanabhan
- Naslen as Melvin Mathew, Jaison's friend
- Shabareesh Varma as Siju, Jaison's cousin
- Vaishakh Vijayan as Dennis
- Franco Francis as Linto aka Lintappan
- Midhun Gopinath as Basil, Jaison's rival
- Reneesh N R as Sandeep
- George Wincent as Justin
- Dinoy Paulose as Joyson, Jaison's elder brother
- Irshad as School Principal
- Nisha Sarang as Keerthy's mother
- Gopika Ramesh as Stephy, Jaison's ex-girlfriend
- Sree Renjini as Aswathy, English Teacher
- Binny Rinky Benjamin as Bindu, Physics Teacher
- Rama Devi as Jaison's mother
- Nandhakumar Koratty as Jaison's father
- Kichu Tellus as Antony, "Matha Jet" Bus Driver
- Vineeth Vishwam as Jaison's cousin's husband
- Sreelakshmi G as Jaison's cousin, Tessy
- Baby as Melvin's Mother
- Adv. M. K. Roy as Keerthy's father
- Anagha Ajithan as Maneesha
- Anagha Biju as Rekha
- Aishwarya Laiby as Aishwarya
- Vishnu Raj as Rahul
- Akash Unnikrishnan as Sarath
- Sajin Cherukayil as Satheesh
- Arshad Ali as Vigil
- Vishnu Mukundan as George
- Vineeth Vasudevan as Tour Guide
- Arun Antony as Vinu
- Varun Dhara as Jaison's cricket mate

== Music ==
Thanneer Mathan Dinangal

Soundtrack album by Justin Varghese
- Released: 2019
- Genre: Feature film soundtrack
- Length: 12:38

Singles from Thanneer Mathan Dinangal
- 1. "; Shyamavarna Roopini; (sung by Pradeep Palluruthy) "; 2. "; Panthu Thiriyanu (Cricket Song); (sung by Vineeth Sreenivasan) "; 3. "; Deivame; (sung by Vidyadharan Master) "

The film's music was composed by Justin Varghese and the lyrics were penned by Suhail Koya. The song Jaathikkathottam sung by Soumya Ramakrishnan and Devadutt Bijibal, garnered popular acclaim upon release. The song Shyamavarna Roopini released on 24 July was inspired from a traditional song of the same title.

No.	Title	Singer(s)	Length
1.	"Jaathikkathottam"	Soumya Ramakrishnan; Devadutt Bijibal	4:02
2.	"Shyamavarna Roopini"	Pradeep Palluruthy	3:21
3.	"Panthu Thiriyanu (Cricket Song)"	Vineeth Sreenivasan	1:59
4.	"Deivame"	Vidyadharan Master	3:06
Total length:			12:38

== Release ==
Being a low budget film the film had a limited release. It had its initial release in Kerala and few other centers outside the state on 26 July. The film was released in Qatar, Oman, Kuwait, Bahrain, UAE, and New Zealand on 8 August 2019. A day later, the film got its theatrical release in United Kingdom, Australia and Ireland. The film was released in United States on 14 July 2019.

== Reception ==
=== Box office ===
The film collected ₹13 crore from first 2 days of its release in Kerala box office.

The film grossed $915,450 from 40 screens in the opening weekend (8 – 11 August) in the United Arab Emirates—best opening of that weekend—and a total of $1,086,048 in five weeks. It collected US$15,327 in two weeks from New Zealand and US$2,612 in the opening weekend in the United Kingdom. The amount from Australia in the opening weekend was US$1204.

The film grossed ₹50 crore from 20 days at the box office, of which ₹27 crore collected from Kerala box office.

=== Critical response ===
Thanneer Mathan Dinangal received positive reviews from critics. Deepa Soman of The Times of India rated the film three stars out of five. She praised the performances of Mathew Thomas and Anaswara Rajan while applauding Vineeth Sreenivasan for his portrayal of a different avatar he hasn't tried so far. According to Soman, "Tales that take one back in time, especially to the formative years of school days, can almost always be a winner. But, to make it a movie-long memorable affair, it takes enough of clever, relatable fun elements and smart storytelling. Thanneermathan is a story that succeeded in presenting them all, for most parts."

Sajin Srijith of The New Indian Express called the film a "high-school drama done right". He said: "Not many of us still have vivid memories of our school days, which surely had both pleasant and embarrassing moments that shaped our formative years. However that doesn't seem to be the case with writer-director Girish A.D. who, in his directional debut, manages to evoke with perfect clarity, a lot of situations that look strikingly familiar even if some of them may not have actually happened to you."

S. R. Praveen of The Hindu praised the film calling it a school story which actually shows what kids do at school, which is not something that can be said about many other school films. He said that the film is "school, as it is".
