= List of highest-grossing Malayalam films =

f Malayalam cinema is part of Indian cinema, based in Kerala and focused on producing films in the Malayalam language. This ranking lists the highest-grossing Malayalam films based on conservative global box office estimates reported by various sources. (Note: See WP:RSP, WP:ICTFSOURCES) The figures are not adjusted for inflation.

== Highest-grossing films worldwide ==
Background shading indicates that a film, or at least one from a series, is currently showing in theatres worldwide.

Peak	Rank	Title	Director	Production Company	Worldwide gross	Year	Ref.
1	1	Bethlehem Kudumba Unit	Girish A. D.	Bhavana Studios; Fahadh Faasil and Friends; Working Class Hero	₹331.09 crore	2026	
1	2	Lokah Chapter 1: Chandra	Dominic Arun	Wayfarer Films	₹302–304 crore	2025	(Note: Lokah Chapter 1: Chandra's reported worldwide gross is from ₹301.98 crore (The Telegraph) to ₹302.5 crore (ThePrint) to ₹303.2 crore (The Week) to ₹304 crore (The Hollywood Reporter))
1	3	L2: Empuraan	Prithviraj Sukumaran	Aashirvad Cinemas; Lyca Productions; Sree Gokulam Movies	₹265–268 crore	2025	(Note: Mint reported ₹265 crore, DNA India and The Financial Express reported ₹268 crore, Firstpost reported ₹268.08 crore)
1	4	Manjummel Boys	Chidambaram	Parava Films	₹242.3 crore	2024	
4	5	Drishyam 3	Jeethu Joseph	Aashirvad Cinemas	₹237.70–238.61 crore	2026	
3	6	Thudarum	Tharun Moorthy	Rejaputhra Visual Media	₹234–235 crore	2025	(Note: Thudarum's reported worldwide grosses vary between ₹234 crores (The Hindustan Times) – ₹235 crore (The Financial Express))
4	7	Vaazha II: Biopic of a Billion Bros	Savin Sa	Imagin Cinemas; WBTS Productions; Shine Screens; Signature Studios; Icon Studios	₹234–235 crore	2026	
1	8	2018	Jude Anthany Joseph	Kavya Film Company; PK Prime Productions	₹180 crore	2023	
3	9	The Goat Life	Blessy	Visual Romance	₹158.50 crore	2024	
3	10	Aavesham	Jithu Madhavan	Anwar Rasheed Entertainments; Fahadh Faasil and Friends	₹156 crore	2024	
8	11	Sarvam Maya	Akhil Sathyan	Firefly Films; Akhil Sathyan Films	₹151 crore	2025	
1	12	Pulimurugan	Vysakh	Mulakuppadam Films	₹139 crore	2016	
4	13	Premalu	Girish A. D.	Bhavana Studios; Fahadh Faasil and Friends; Working Class Hero	₹136.25 crore	2024	
2	14	Lucifer	Prithviraj Sukumaran	Aashirvad Cinemas	₹129 crore	2019	
12	15	Aadu 3	Midhun Manuel Thomas	Friday Film House; Kavya Film Company	₹120.10 crore	2026	
8	16	Marco	Haneef Adeni	Cubes Entertainments	₹110 crore	2024	
8	17	ARM	Jithin Laal	Magic Frames; UGM Entertainment	₹107.77 crore	2024	
10	18	Guruvayoor Ambalanadayil	Vipin Das	Prithviraj Productions; E4 Entertainment	₹90.25 crore	2024	
3	19	Bheeshma Parvam	Amal Neerad	Amal Neerad Productions	₹88.10 crore	2022	
10	20	Neru	Jeethu Joseph	Aashirvad Cinemas	₹86 crore	2023	
16	21	Kalamkaval	Jithin K Jose	Mammootty Kampany	₹85.2 crore	2025	
9	22	RDX: Robert Dony Xavier	Nahas Hidhayath	Weekend Blockbusters	₹84.55 crore	2023	
17	23	Diés Iraé	Rahul Sadasivan	Night Shift Studios; YNOT Studios	₹83 crore	2025	
12	24	Varshangalkku Shesham	Vineeth Sreenivasan	Merryland Cinemas	₹82.75 crore	2024	
11	25	Kannur Squad	Roby Varghese Raj	Mammootty Kampany	₹82 crore	2023	

== Highest-grossing films by market ==
Background shading indicates that a film, or at least one from a series, is currently showing in theatres worldwide.

=== India ===
Rank	Title	Domestic gross	Year	Ref.
1	Bethlehem Kudumba Unit	₹192.64 crore	2026	
2	Lokah Chapter 1: Chandra	₹183.70 crore	2025	
3	Manjummel Boys	₹167.65 crore	2024	
5	Thudarum	₹148.58 crore	2025	
4	Vaazha II: Biopic of a Billion Bros	₹141.71 crore	2026	
6	Drishyam 3	₹127.50 crore	2026	
7	L2: Empuraan	₹124.56 crore	2025	
8	2018	₹107.05 crore	2023	
9	Pulimurugan	₹105.90 crore	2016	
10	Aavesham	₹101.15 crore	2024	

==== Kerala ====
Rank	Title	Kerala gross	Year	Ref.
1	Bethlehem Kudumba Unit	₹155.50 crore	2026	
2	Vaazha II: Biopic of a Billion Bros	₹129.55 crore	2026	
3	Lokah Chapter 1: Chandra	₹121.95 crore	2025	
4	Thudarum	₹118.90 crore	2025	
5	Drishyam 3	₹90.04 crore	2026	
6	2018	₹89.20 crore	2023	
7	L2: Empuraan	₹86.25 crore	2025	
8	Pulimurugan	₹85.10 crore	2016	
9	The Goat Life	₹79.30 crore	2024	
10	Sarvam Maya	₹78 crore	2025	

==== Tamil Nadu ====
Rank	Title	Gross	Year	Ref.
1	Manjummel Boys	₹64 crore	2025	
2	Lokah Chapter 1: Chandra	₹24.10 crore	2025	
3	Premalu	₹11 crore	2024	
4	Bethlehem Kudumba Unit	₹10.95 crore	2026	
5	Aavesham	₹10.57 crore	2024	
5	L2: Empuraan	₹10.57 crore	2025	
7	Drishyam 3	₹10.01 crore	2026	

==== Karnataka ====
Rank	Title	Gross	Year	Ref.
1	Lokah Chapter 1: Chandra	₹15.75 crore	2025	
2	Drishyam 3	₹15.52 crore	2026	
3	Bethlehem Kudumba Unit	₹13.91 crore	2026	
4	L2: Empuraan	₹12.75 crore	2025	
5	Lokah Chapter 1: Chandra	₹12.6 crore	2024	
6	Aavesham	₹11.28 crore	2024	
7	Thudarum	₹11.09 crore	2025	
8	Vaazha II: Biopic of a Billion Bros	₹7.6 crore	2026	

==== Andhra Pradesh and Telangana ====
Rank	Title	Gross	Year	Ref.
1	Lokah Chapter 1: Chandra	₹14.65 crore	2025	
2	Premalu	₹13.55 crore	2024	
3	Pulimurugan	₹12 crore	2016	
4	2018	₹10.85 crore	2023	
5	Drishyam 3	₹9.1 crore	2026	

==== Rest of India ====
Rank	Title	Gross	Year	Ref.
1	Marco	₹12.41 crore	2024	
2	L2: Empuraan	₹9.36 crore	2025	
3	Lokah Chapter 1: Chandra	₹8.6 crore	2025	
4	Drishyam 3	₹6.23 crore	2026	
5	Bethlehem Kudumba Unit	₹5.89 crore	2026	

=== International Markets ===
Rank	Title	Overseas gross	Year	Ref.
1	L2: Empuraan	₹141.8 crore	2025	
2	Bethlehem Kudumba Unit	₹138.65 crore	2026	
3	Lokah Chapter 1: Chandra	₹119.5 crore	2025	
4	Drishyam 3	₹111.70 crore	2026	
5	Thudarum	₹93 crore	2025	
6	Vaazha II: Biopic of a Billion Bros	₹85.7 crore	2026	

== Highest-grossing opening day ==
Rank	Title	Worldwide gross	Year	Ref.
1	L2: Empuraan	₹68.20 crore	2025	
2	Drishyam 3	₹50.35 crore	2026	
3	Patriot	₹29.10 crore	2026	
4	Marakkar: Lion of the Arabian Sea	₹19.92 crore	2021	
5	Kurup	₹19 crore	2021	
6	Aadu 3	₹18.01 crore	2026	
7	Odiyan	₹17.5 crore	2018	
8	Turbo	₹17.3 crore	2024	
9	Thudarum	₹16.65 crore	2025	
10	Bethlehem Kudumba Unit	₹16.20 crore	2026	

== Highest-grossing opening weekend ==
Rank	Title	Worldwide gross	Year	Days	Ref.
1	L2: Empuraan	₹174 crore	2025	4	
2	Drishyam 3	₹141 crore	2026	4	
3	Aadu 3	₹87 crore	2026	3	
4	Thudarum	₹70 crore	2025	3	
5	Lokah Chapter 1: Chandra	₹65 crore	2025	4	
6	The Goat Life	₹65 crore	2024	4	
7	Patriot	₹64 crore	2026	3	
8	Bethlehem Kudumba Unit	₹64 crore	2026	3	
9	Vaazha II: Biopic of a Billion Bros	₹63 crore	2026	4	
10	Lucifer	₹52.3 crore	2019	4	

== Highest-grossing films by month ==
Month	Title	Worldwide gross	Year	Ref.
January	Rekhachithram	₹57.3 crore	2025	
February	Manjummel Boys	₹242.3 crore	2024	
March	L2: Empuraan	₹265–268.05 crore	2025	
April	Vaazha II: Biopic of a Billion Bros	₹234.45 crore	2026	
May	Drishyam 3	₹242 crore	2026	
June	Thondimuthalum Driksakshiyum	₹50.3 crore	2017	
July	Paappan	₹50.1 crore	2022	
August	Bethlehem Kudumba Unit	₹331.09 crore	2026	
September	ARM	₹107.77 crore	2024	
October	Pulimurugan	₹139–145 crore	2016	
November	Kurup	₹81 crore	2021	
December	Sarvam Maya	₹153 crore	2025	

== Highest-grossing films by year ==
Year	Title	Worldwide gross	Ref.
2000	Narasimham	₹22 crore	
2001	Raavanaprabhu	₹17 crore	
2002	Meesa Madhavan	₹15 crore	
2003	Balettan	₹14 crore	
2004	Sethurama Iyer CBI	₹16 crore	
2005	Rajamanikyam	₹25 crore	
2006	Classmates	₹24 crore	
2007	Mayavi	₹15 crore	
2008	Twenty:20	₹32 crore	
2009	Kerala Varma Pazhassi Raja	₹21 crore	
2010	Pokkiri Raja	₹16.5 crore	
2011	Christian Brothers	₹28 crore	
2012	Mayamohini	₹22 crore	
2013	Drishyam	₹62 crore	
2014	Bangalore Days	₹48.3 crore	
2015	Premam	₹73 crore	
2016	Pulimurugan	₹139–145 crore	
2017	Ramaleela	₹55 crore	
2018	Kayamkulam Kochunni	₹67−70 crore	
2019	Lucifer	₹129 crore	(Note: Lucifer's reported worldwide gross varies between ₹125.50 crore (Pinkvilla) – ₹127 crore (The New Indian Express))
2020	Anjaam Pathiraa	₹47.65 crore	
2021	Kurup	₹81 crore	
2022	Bheeshma Parvam	₹88.1 crore	
2023	2018	₹180 crore	
2024	Manjummel Boys	₹242.3 crore	
2025	Lokah Chapter 1: Chandra	₹304 crore	
2026	Bethlehem Kudumba Unit*	₹331.09 crore	

== Highest-grossing franchises ==
Highest-grossing franchises

Rank	Franchise	Worldwide gross (crore) (Note: The franchise gross is calculated using the lowest reported gross for each film in the franchise.)	No. of films	Average gross (crore)	Highest grosser

1	Lucifer	₹397.05	2	₹199	L2: Empuraan (₹268.05 crores)
1	Lucifer (2019)	₹129			
2	L2: Empuraan (2025)	₹268.05			

2	Drishyam	₹303.41	3	₹101	Drishyam 3 (₹241.41 crore)
1	Drishyam (2013)	₹62			
2	Drishyam 2 (2021) (Note: OTT Release)				
3	Drishyam 3 (2026)	₹241.41			

3	Vaazha	₹272.71	2	₹136	Vaazha II: Biopic of a Billion Bros (₹235 crores)
1	Vaazha: Biopic of a Billion Boys (2024)	₹38.25			
2	Vaazha II: Biopic of a Billion Bros (2026)	₹234.46			

4	Aadu	₹162.23	3	₹54	Aadu 3 (₹120.08 crores)
1	Aadu (2015)	₹6.50			
2	Aadu 2 (2017)	₹35.65			
3	Aadu 3 (2026)	₹120.08			

5	Mikhael Extended Universe	₹134.48	3	₹45	Marco (₹110 crores)
1	Mikhael (2019)	₹9.48			
2	Marco (2024)	₹110			
3	Kattalan (2026)	₹15			

6	Raja	₹94.67	2	₹47	Madhura Raja (₹78.42 crores)
1	Pokkiri Raja (2009)	₹16.25			
2	Madhura Raja (2019)	₹78.42			

7	CBI	₹66.4	5	₹13	CBI 5: The Brain (₹37 crores)
1	Oru CBI Diary Kurippu (1988)	₹2			
2	Jagratha (1989)	₹3.4			
3	Sethurama Iyer CBI (2004)	₹16			
4	Nerariyan CBI (2005)	₹8			
5	CBI 5: The Brain (2022)	₹37			

8	Bharathanatyam	₹52.94	2	₹26	Bharathanatyam 2 Mohiniyattam (₹52 crores)
1	Bharathanatyam (2024)	₹0.94			
2	Bharathanatyam 2 Mohiniyattam (2026)	₹52			

9	Charlie	₹42.17	2	₹21	Charlie (₹42 crores)
1	Charlie (2015)	₹42			
2	Kallan D'Souza (2022)	₹0.17			

10	Major Mahadevan	₹41.21	4	₹10	Keerthi Chakra (₹17.27 crores)
1	Keerthi Chakra (2006)	₹17.27			
2	Kurukshetra (2008)	₹8.27			
3	Kandahar (2010)	₹5.50			
4	1971: Beyond Borders (2017)	₹10.17			

== Highest-grossing director ==
The list contains the total box office collection from only Malayalam Films

Rank	Name	Box Office in crore	No. of films	Highest grosser	Ref.
1	Girish A. D.	₹533	5	Bethlehem Kudumba Unit (₹331.09 crore)	
2	Jeethu Joseph	₹473.5	22	Drishyam 3 (₹242 crore)	
3	Vysakh	₹396–402	12	Pulimurugan (₹139–145 crore)	
4	Prithviraj Sukumaran	₹394–397.08	3	L2: Empuraan (₹265–268.08 crore)	
5	Dominic Arun	₹304	3	Lokah Chapter 1: Chandra (₹304 crore)	
6	Chidambaram S. Poduval	₹272.54	3	Manjummel Boys (₹241.3 crore)	
7	Midhun Manuel Thomas	₹255	8	Aadu 3 (₹120.11 crore)	
8	Tharun Moorthy	₹242.3–243.3	3	Thudarum (₹234–235 crore)	
9	Savin SA	₹234–235	1	Vaazha II: Biopic of a Billion Bros (₹234–235 crore)	
10	Jithu Madhavan	₹226	2	Aavesham (₹156 crore)	

== Box office milestones ==
The following are list the flims that have reached the below milestones first in the Malayalam flim industry

Milestone	Title	Year	Director	Production company	Final Gross	Ref.
₹1 crore	Thacholi Ambu	1978	Navodaya Appachan	Navodaya Studio	est.₹1−1.2 crore	
₹5 crore	Kilukkam	1991	Priyadarshan	Goodknight Films	est.₹5 crore	
₹10 crore	The King	1995	Shaji Kailas	Quality International	₹10 crore	
₹15 crore	Chandralekha	1996	Priyadarshan	Fazils	est.₹15 crore	
₹20 crore	Narasimham	2000	Shaji Kailas	Aashirvad Cinemas	est.₹20 crore	
₹25 crore	Rajamanikyam	2005	Anwar Rasheed	Valiyaveettil Movie International	₹25 crore	
₹50 crore	Drishyam	2013	Jeethu Joseph	Aashirvad Cinemas	₹62 crore	
₹100 crore	Pulimurugan	2016	Vysakh	Mulakuppadam Films	est.₹139–145 crore	
₹150 crore	2018	2023	Jude Anthany Joseph	Kavya Film Company, PK Prime Production	est.₹177 crore	
₹200 crore	Manjummel Boys	2024	Chidambaram	Parava Films	₹242.3 crore	
₹250 crore	L2: Empuraan	2025	Prithviraj Sukumaran	Aashirvad Cinemas, Lyca Productions, Sree Gokulam Movies	est.₹265–268 crore	
₹300 crore	Lokah Chapter 1: Chandra	2025	Dominic Arun	Wayfarer Films	₹303–305 crore	
₹325 crore	Bethlehem Kudumba Unit	2026	Girish A. D.	Bhavana Studios, Fahadh Faasil and Friends, Working Class Hero	₹332 crore	

== See also ==
- List of highest-grossing Indian films
  - List of highest-grossing Kannada films
  - List of highest-grossing Tamil films
  - List of highest-grossing Telugu films
  - List of highest-grossing Hindi films
- List of highest-grossing South Indian films
- List of highest-grossing films in India
- 100 Crore Club
- 1000 Crore Club
