= List of Malayalam films of 2026 =

This is a list of Malayalam-language films released in 2026.

== Box-office collection ==
The highest-grossing Malayalam films released in 2026, by worldwide box office gross revenue, are as follows.

*	Denotes films still running in cinemas worldwide

Highest worldwide gross of 2026
Rank	Title	Production company	Worldwide gross	Ref
1	Bethlehem Kudumba Unit	Bhavana Studios; Working Class Hero; Fahadh Faasil and Friends	₹331.09 crore	
2	Drishyam 3	Aashirvad Cinemas; Panorama Studios; Pen Studios	₹242 crore	
3	Vaazha II: Biopic of a Billion Bros	WBTS Productions; Imagin Cinemas; Shine Screens; Signature Studios; Icon Studios	₹234–235 crore	
4	Aadu 3	Friday Film House; Kavya Film Company	₹121.33 crore	
5	Patriot	Anto Joseph Film Companies; Kichappus Entertainments; C R Saleem Productions; Blue Tigers London	₹80 crore	
6	Athiradi	Basil Joseph Entertainment; Dr. Ananthu Entertainments	₹71 crore	
7	I'm Game	Wayfarer Films	₹50 crore	
8	Khalifa: The Ruler	Jiinu Abraham Innovations	₹50 crore	
9	Thudakkam	Aashirvad Cinemas	₹50 crore	
10	Pradhama Drishtiya Kuttakkar	11 Icons Film Productions	₹50 crore	

== January–March ==
*	Film released directly on OTT platform(s).

Opening		Title	Director	Cast	Production company / studio	Ref
JANUARY	2	Appuram	Indu Lakshmi	Jagadish, Anagha Maya Ravi, Mini I. G.	Indus Cinemas	
JANUARY	3	Poovu	Anish Babu Abbas, Binoy George	Manjulan K. V., K. P. A. C. Leela, Sruthi Vipin, Meenakshi Anoop, Santhi Rao	Pinks Visual Space	
JANUARY	9	Velleppam	Praveen Raj P	Akshay Radhakrishnan, Noorin Shereef, Shine Tom Chacko, Roma Asrani	Baroque Entertainments	
JANUARY	10	Pennu Case	Febin Sidharth	Nikhila Vimal, Aju Varghese, Hakim Shahjahan, Ramesh Pisharody	E4 Experiments, Zee Studios, London Talkies	
JANUARY	10	Njaan Karnan 2	Srichithra Pradeep	T. S. Raju, Tony, Srichithra Pradeep, Pradeep Raj	Sriya Creations	
JANUARY	15	Randam Mukham	Kshanajith S Vijayan	Manikandan R. Achari, Mareena Michael Kurisingal, Anjali Nair	Kanda Films, U Company	
JANUARY	16	Kanimangalam Kovilakam	Raajesh Mohan	Mohammad Rafi, Tony Jose, Vignesh R., Gopi Nair	Clapboard Films, British Cinemas	
JANUARY	16	Pushpangadante Onnam Swayamvaram	Surendran Payyanackal	Unni Raja, C M Jose, Nimisha Bijo, Gineesh Govind, Jalaja Rani	Cheenkallel Films	
JANUARY	16	Rudra	Sajeev Kilikulam	Nishi Govind, Sajeev Kilikulam, Brucelee Rajesh, Suresh Arangu	Kilikulam FIlms	
JANUARY	16	Oru Wayanadan Pranayakadha	Ilyas Mudangassery	Jesuj Antony, Shyjan Sreevalsam, Akshaya Suresh, Joohi Jayakumar	M. K. Productions	
JANUARY	21	Soochana	Jose Thomas	Manikandan R. Achari, Sajid Yahiya, Megha Mathew	Visual Dreams	
JANUARY	22	Chatha Pacha	Adhvaith Nayar	Arjun Ashokan, Roshan Mathew, Vishak Nair, Ishan Shoukath, Carmen S Mathew	Reel World Entertainment	
JANUARY	23	Magic Mushrooms	Nadirshah	Vishnu Unnikrishnan, Akshaya Udayakumar, Meenakshi Dinesh, Pooja Mohanraj, Harisree Ashokan, Jaffar Idukki, Johny Antony	Manjadi Creations	
JANUARY	23	Baby Girl	Arun Varma	Nivin Pauly, Lijomol Jose, Sangeeth Prathap, Aditi Ravi, Abhimanyu Shammi Thilakan	Magic Frames	
JANUARY	23	Pazhuthu	Stalin Alexander, Akbar	Rejan Krishna, Aiswarya Subash, Nincy Xavier, Stalin Alexander	Kottaka Entertainments	
JANUARY	23	Sheshippu	Gritto Vincent, Sreejith S Kumar	Rashid Rahman, Meenakshi Jayan, Rajan Pootharakkal,	Cinema Pranthan Film Productions	
JANUARY	30	Valathu Vashathe Kallan	Jeethu Joseph	Biju Menon, Joju George, Lenaa, Leona Lishoy, Shaju Sreedhar, Priya Sreejith	Goodwill Entertainments	
JANUARY	30	Christina	Sudarshanan	Sudheer Karamana, Arya Babu, Suneesh K Jaan, Kalabhavan Nandhana	C S Films	
JANUARY	30	Prakambanam	Vijesh Panathur	Ganapati, Sagar Surya, Al Ameen, Rajesh Madhavan, Sheethal Joseph	Stone Bench Studios, Navarasa Films	
FEBRUARY	5	Aashaan	Johnpaul George	Indrans, Joemon Jyothir, Shobi Thilakan	Guppy Cinemas, Wayfarer films	
FEBRUARY	6	Anomie	Riyas Marath	Bhavana, Rahman, Binu Pappu, Arjun Lal, Shebin Benson, Vishnu Agasthya	Panorama studios, Blitzkrieg Films, Bhavana Film Productions, APK Cinemas	
FEBRUARY	6	Ashakal Aayiram	G. Prajith	Jayaram, Kalidas Jayaram, Asha Sharath, Sharaf U Dheen, Ishaani Krishna	Sree Gokulam Movies	
FEBRUARY	6	Ithaanu Friendship	AKB Kumar	Chandana Aravind, Chitra Rajesh, Sulffiker Asiz, Unni S Nair, Kirankumar C S, Anay Sathyan, Devan, Spadikam George	AKB Movies International, M.S Creations	
FEBRUARY	6	Karuthal	Jomy Kose	Prasant Murali, Aishwarya Nandan, Kottayam Ramesh, Sunil Sukhada	Dreams on Screen Productions	
FEBRUARY	6	Madhanamoham	Ram Chand Prasanth	Subhash Kongorpilly, Chandana Aravind, Hanna Agarwal	Vayakodan Movie Studio, New Gen Movie Makers	
FEBRUARY	6	Shukran	Ubaini E	Bibin George, Aadhiya Prasad, Shine Tom Chacko, Chandhunadh	Neal Cinemas	
FEBRUARY	6	The Late Kunjappa	Shijith Kalyadan	Ramakrishnan Pazhassi, Sasidharan Mattannur, Ratheesh Iritty, Leela Koombaala	Kannur Kafe	
FEBRUARY	6	Ragu Ram	Sainu Chavakkadan	Aadesh Bala, Athiswa Mohan, Sampath Ram, Aravind Vinod, Charmila	Celestia Productions	
FEBRUARY	13	AT: Welcome to the Dark Side	Donmax	Shaju Sreedhar, Akash Sen, Rachel David, Nayana Elsa, Saran Jith	Kochurani Productions	
FEBRUARY	13	Ee Thani Niram	Ratheesh Nedumangadu	Anoop Menon, Ramesh Pisharody, Noby Marcose, Gowri Gopan	Dhanush Films	
FEBRUARY	13	Juniors Journey	Anson Antony	Meenakshi Anoop, Sarath Gopal, Vijayaraghavan, Joemon Joshy	Jetmedia Production House	
FEBRUARY	13	Koodothram	Baiju Ezhupunna	Baiju Ezhupunna, Dinoy Paulose, Rachel David	Sanjo Productions	
FEBRUARY	13	Naalpathukalile Pranayam	Ramesh Makayiram	Jerry John, Asha Vasudevan, Kudassanad Kanakam, Sreedevi Unni	Mazha Films	
FEBRUARY	13	Pennum Porattum	Rajesh Madhavan	Raina Radhakrishnan, Subash Chandran, Rajesh Madhavan	STK Frames	
FEBRUARY	13	Spa	Abrid Shine	Sidharth Bharathan, Shruthy Menon, Radhika Radhakrishnan, Vineeth Thattil, Poojitha Menon	Sparayil Creations, Sanchoo Films	
FEBRUARY	13	Sukhamano Sukhamann	Arunlal Ramachandran	Mathew Thomas, Devika Sanjay, Jagadish	Lucifer Circus	
FEBRUARY	20	Moothashari	Suresh Iringalloor	Dr. venugopal, Mattannoor Sankarankutty, Mohan Kartha	Kappoor Films	
FEBRUARY	21	Pupa	Tony Sukumar	Jeevesh Varghese, Deepa Saji, Haridas K R, Pramod Padiyath, Shenin Shajahan	Nadana Thirtha Productions	
FEBRUARY	27	Masthishka Maranam	Krishand	Rajisha Vijayan, Niranj Maniyanpilla Raju, Vishnu Agasthya, Divya Prabha	Ajith Vinayaka Films	
FEBRUARY	27	Iniyum	Jeeva	Ashkar Saudan, Kailash, Saneesh Meleppat, Bhadra, Ambika Mohan	Yadu Film Factory	
FEBRUARY	27	Ente Jeevitha Nombaram	Rajan Sreedharan	Vishnu Karthik, Priyanka Chandran, Madhu,	Miracle Creations	
FEBRUARY	27	ICU	George Varghese	Bibin George, Murali Gopy, Meera Vasudevan, Baburaj	Mini Studio	
FEBRUARY	27	KKK Moonnu Raja	Shyju Parathadathil	Shyju Parathadathil, Sonia Salas, P. C. George	Revathy Films International	
FEBRUARY	27	Priya Puthren	H Manjunath	Guinness Pakru, Padma Vasanthi, Ramesh Bhat	Power Star Creations	
FEBRUARY	27	School Chale Hum	Sreekanth E G	Sujay Krishna A, Roshin Vinod, Devika Prakash, Amegh Murali, Kalyani Satheesh, Abhinand Aneesh	Letgo Productions, Amor Film House.	
FEBRUARY	28	2 BHK	Sudip E S	Vyshnavi Kalyani, Shekhar Narayan, Naveen Palakkad, Anoop Krishna, Bindu Krishna, Satheesh Kalabhavan	Neelambari Movie Club	
MARCH	6	Sambhavam Adhyayam Onnu	Jithu Satheesan Mangalathu	Askar Ali, Vineeth Kumar, Assim Jamal, Sidharth Bharathan, Fahad Sidheekh	NallaCinema Productions	
MARCH	6	Faces	Neelesh E K	Kalesh Ramanand, Hannah Reji Koshy, Mareena Michael Kurisingal, Arjun Gopal, Sarayu Mohan	Sri Angalamman Films	
MARCH	6	Merry Christmas	Midhun Jyothi	Dayyana Hameed, Karthik Ramakrishnan, Maala Parvathi, Jayaraj Warrier	K H Pictures	
MARCH	6	Pinvaathil	J C George	Ajith George, Mihirah Gurupadappa, Athiswa Mohan	Canjanathoppil Film Factory	
MARCH	6	Eric	Shankar	Hemanth Menon, Geethika Tiwary, Kavitha Santhosh, Deepu Navayikulam	Q Cinemas, Oshio Entertainments	
MARCH	6	Butterfly Girl 85	Prasanth Murali	Esheka Krishnaa, Sri Dhanya Vishwanath, Geetha Jithu, Anu Prabha, Anwar Sadique	4D Productions	
MARCH	6	Veri	Shaan Thanha	Joemon Joshy, Bibin Nair, Tina Jose , Kiran Sariga	Oasis International Films	
MARCH	8	Iravan	Binuraj Kallada	Abhijith Wayanad, Anjana Mohan, Binuraj Kallada	Ashaan Productions	
MARCH	13	Aaru Aanugal	Sambraj Nair	Shivamurali, Naseef Othayi, Balu Kylas, Aadil Muhammad, Adithya Hari	Manjusallapam Media	
MARCH	13	Bernard	Devaprasad Narayanan	Appani Sarath, Anjali Ameer	Budhadev Cinema Park	
MARCH	13	Ponnapurathu Yakshi	S. P Unnikrishnan	Boban Alumoodan, Manju Vijeesh	Vishalu Parambil Productions	
MARCH	19	Aadu 3	Midhun Manuel Thomas	Jayasurya, Saiju Kurup, Vinayakan, Sunny Wayne, Vijay Babu, Dharmajan Bolgatty	Friday Film House, Kavya Film Company	
MARCH	20	Bhishmar	East coast Vijayan	Dhyan Sreenivasan, Divya Pillai, Vishnu Unnikrishnan, Ammayraa Goswami	East Coast Communications	
MARCH	26	Prathichaya	B. Unnikrishnan	Nivin Pauly, Neethu Krishna, Sharaf U Dheen, Balachandra Menon, Ann Augustine	Sree Gokulam Movies	
MARCH	27	Kalyanamaram	Rajesh Amanakara	Dhyan Sreenivasan, Deva Nandha, Meera Vasudevan, Noby Marcose, Manoj K. U.	Mariyem Cinema	
MARCH	27	Derby	Sajl Mampad	Sagar Surya, Adam Sabiq, Johny Antony, Abu Salim, Shabareesh Varma, Franco Francis, Anshid Anu	Demanz Film Factory	
MARCH	27	Grahanam 2.0	Anand Paga	Gibu George, Anand Paga, Devika Sivan	Sreenandiya Productions	

== April–June ==
Opening		Title	Director	Cast	Production company / studio	Ref
APRIL	2	Vaazha II: Biopic of a Billion Bros	Savin SA	Hashir, Alan Bin Siraj, Ajin Joy, Vinayak, Alphonse Puthren, Sudheesh, Vijay Babu	Imagine Cinemas, Vipin Das Productions	
APRIL	3	Pagida Kali	Nishad Hasan	Tito Wilson, Devasurya Muralidharan, Ranjiitha MUkundan, Anna Mariya	Deva Surya Film House	
APRIL	10	Mohiniyattam	Krishnadas Murali	Saiju Kurup, Suraj Venjaramood, Kalaranjini, Sreeja Ravi, Abhiram Radhakrishnan, Baby Jean	Thomas Kuruvila Films, Saiju Kurup Entertainments	
APRIL	15	Oru Durooha Saahacharyathil	Ratheesh Balakrishnan Poduval	Kunchacko Boban, Sajin Gopu, Dileesh Pothan, Chidambaram S. Poduval, Rajesh Madhavan, Sudheesh, Pooja Mohanraj	Magic Frames, Udaya Pictures	
APRIL	15	Kuvi	Sakhil Raveendran	I M Vijayan, Sabu Soorya, Sijin Satheesh, Vinod Indrajith	Pearl Movie creations	
APRIL	15	Pallichattambi	Dijo Jose Antony	Tovino Thomas, Kayadu Lohar, Vijayaraghavan, Alexander Prasanth	World Wide Films, C Qube Bros Productions	
APRIL	18	Thala	Khais Millen	Surabhi Lakshmi, Binoy Antony, Shaalin Zoya, Sneha Anu	Better Earth Entertainments	
APRIL	23	Madhuvidhu	Vishnu Aravind	Sharaf U Dheen, Kalyani Panicker, Jagadish, Azees Nedumangad	Ajith Vinayaka Films	
APRIL	24	Achappa's Album	Deepti Sivan	Mohan Agashe, Priyanka Nair, Johny Antony	NFDC	
APRIL	24	Dark Tracking	A K Sreekumar	Aristo Suresh, Asha Nair, Nitha Radha, Rency Elizabeth, Jerry Tom	RJ Combines & Creations	
APRIL	24	Iruniram	Jinto Thomas	Thanmaya Sol, Dinesh P, Nisha Sarang, Jio Baby, Kabani Saira	Malola Productions	
APRIL	24	Kaalam Paranja Kadha	Prasad Nooranad	Nisha Sarangh, Jayan Cherthala, Ajas Navaz, Sandra S L	Nadakasala Movies	
APRIL	25	Kidilam Paru	Sugesh S Achary	Devi Nandana, Hari Balakrishnan, Arun Lal Kannan, Neeraj Chithrkoodam, Sugesh S Achary	Pied Piper Entertainments	
MAY	1	Patriot	Mahesh Narayanan	Mammootty, Mohanlal, Fahadh Faasil, Kunchacko Boban, Nayanthara, Rajiv Menon, Indrans, Grace Antony, Zarin Shihab, Revathi	Anto Joseph Film Company, Kichappus Entertainments, C R Saleem Productions, Blue Tigers London	
MAY	1	Aval	Jayaraj	Surabhi Lakshmi, Niranjana Anoop, K.P.A.C. Lalitha, Sabitha Jayaraj, Nitin Renji Panicker	Golden Wings Productions	
MAY	8	Dridam	Martin Joseph	Shane Nigam, Shobi Thilakan, Krishna Praba	E4 Entertainments, Bedtime Stories	
MAY	8	Revolver Rinko	Kiran Narayanan	Vishnu Unnikrishnan, Sreepath Yan, Ansha Mohan, Vijilesh Karayad	Tharaka Productions	
MAY	8	Ankam Attahasam	Sujith S Nair	Madhav Suresh, Saiju Kurup, Shine Tom Chacko	Triani Productions	
MAY	14	Athiradi	Arun Anirudhan	Tovino Thomas, Basil Joseph, Vineeth Sreenivasan, Darshana Rajendran, Riya Shibu, Zarin Shihab	Basil Joseph Entertainment, Doctor Anandu Entertainment	
MAY	15	Swachanthamruthyu	Shan Kechery	Shivaji Guruvayoor, Shreekala Shyam, Jayaraj Warrier	Wide Screen Media	
MAY	19	Sudhipuranam	S.S. Jishnu Dev	Abhishek Sreekumar, Prince Johnson, Sailan Timotheus, Varadha, Sheela Sailan, Ramesh Attukal	Federation of Global Film Makers	
MAY	21	Drishyam 3	Jeethu Joseph	Mohanlal, Meena, Ansiba Hassan, Esther Anil, Asha Sharath, Siddique	Aashirvad Cinemas	
MAY	22	Dose	Abhilash R Nair	Siju Wilson, Drishya Reghunath, Ashwin Kumar, Krishna Kurup	Ezinematic Pictures, Wonder Moods Productions	
MAY	22	Thirakkinidayil Alpaneram	Jayan Anikadu	Anirudh Ramesh, Navan Lal, Ajith Koothattukulam, Shivani Anil	Ads Production House, Nilavu Creations	
MAY	22	Cold	Anoop K K	Reena Maria, Monisha Mohan, Rasmitha Ramachandran, Srikanth K. Vijayan	Shally Suman Production	
MAY	28	Kattalan	Paul George	Antony Varghese, Dushara Vijayan, Kabir Duhan Singh, Sunil, Jagadish	Cubes Entertainments	
MAY	28	Karakkam	Subhash Lalitha Subrahmanian	Sreenath Bhasi, Femina George, Sidharth Bharathan, Jean Paul Lal, Shaun Romy	Black Turtle Productions, Krown Stars Entertainments	
MAY	29	Dr. Bennat	T S Babu	Jins Joy, Ayesha Zeenat, Kottayam Nazeer, Shaju Sreedhar, Divya Nair	V R Movie House, Abaaji Films	
MAY	29	Paithalattam	Vibin N Velayudhan	Jayan Cherthala, Dhanya Ananya, Sunil Sukhada, Appunni Sasi	S L Media, Aiswarya Movie Makers	
MAY	29	Kirata	Roshan Konni	Chembil Ashokan, Jeeva Nambiar, Neena Kurup, M. R. Gopakumar	Edathody Films	
MAY	30	Aaahladam	Jijish Gopi	Alanthattil Anuraj, Helna Mathew, Vibin Narayanan, Rajeesh Menon, Mariya Santhosh, Shilparani, Prince Paul, Master Aniketh Jijish	Holly Dreams Productions, Vibe Creations Media Productions	
JUNE	5	Mollywood Times	Abhinav Sunder Nayak	Naslen, Sharaf U Dheen, Sangeeth Prathap, Roshan Shanavas	Ashiq Usman Productions	
JUNE	5	Prathirodham	John Britto	O M R Razak, C R Aajaya Kumar, Rakhi, Saji S, Vijay, K Ajith Kumar	Mad Hollywood	
JUNE	7	Manal Pakshikal	Shafi Parakal	Shanavas Shanu, Santhosh Keezhattoor, Anjali Nair	Rose Petals Films	
JUNE	12	Peeli	Bestin Kuriakose	Sajith Thoppil, James Parakka, Rajalakshmi, Sayana Sana	Alwyn Joseph Films	
JUNE	13	Normal	Pratheesh Prasad	Garggi Ananthan, Prashanth Murali, Manchi, Benny Thankavel, Baiju Gangadharan, James Mannencheril	Wabi Sabi Film Collective	
JUNE	14	Kolahalamedu	Sen Varghese	Aravind R Nair, Prince, Praveen K Shan, Ashar Sha, Mohanan Panavally	Sara's Films	
JUNE	18	Secret of Kalinga	Saneesh Unnikrishnan	Dhyan Sreenivasan, Malavika Menon	Aira Films	
JUNE	19	Balan: The Boy	Chidambaram S. Poduval	Adisheshan, Farzana Palathingal, Tovino Thomas, Dolly June, Beena Antony, Jean Paul Lal	KVN Productions, Thespian Films	
JUNE	19	Sathyathil Sambhavichathu	Prasanth Mohan	Dileesh Pothen, Aswathy Sreekanth, Johnny Antony	P R Entertainments	
JUNE	19	Chinna Chinna Aasai	Varsha Vasudev	Indrans, Madhubala, Aparna Balamurali, Thambi Ramaiah	Babuji Productions	
JUNE	21	Aadi Snehathinte Virunnu Mesha	Mini I G	Divya Usha Gopinath, Akhila Nath, Soumya VS, Laban Ranae, Amalendu, Mubarak	Mini Movie Makers	
JUNE	25	Ananthan Kaadu (Note: The film was shot in both Tamil and Malayalam simultaneously.)	Jiyen Krishnakumar	Arya, Vijayaraghavan, Sunil, Nikhila Vimal, Murali Gopy	Mini Studios, The Show People	
JUNE	26	Uyir	M. Padmakumar	Roshan Mathew, Baiju Santhosh, Vineeth Thattil David, Divya M. Nair, Santhosh Thrivikraman, Athulya Chandra	Vow Cinemas	
JUNE	26	Choott	K.V.A. Prasad	Adarsh Krishna, Sivapriya, Shivaji Guruvayoor, Kalabhaban Nandana	Zoom Cinemas	
JUNE	26	Lady in the Wings	Sofie Titus	Sofie Titus, Santosh Keezhattoor, Rajesh Hebbar	Sofie Titus Productions	

== July–September ==
Opening		Title	Director	Cast	Production company / studio	Ref
JULY	3	Aroopi	Abhilsh Warrier	Joy Mathew, Sakshi Badala, Neha Chawla, Anjana Mohan, Sindhu Varma	Punartham Productions	
JULY	3	Bolagolam	Junaise Kappu	Kailash, Akhil Prabhakar, Aaliya, Unni Nair	Andalot Productions	
JULY	3	Kla Kla Klee Klee Nazriya Thirinjunokki	K M Hari Narayanan	Gautam Harinarayanan, Divya Thomas, Shankar Panicker, Nizar Mamukkoya	Matuag Productions	
JULY	3	Vadu: The Scar	Sreejith Poyilkavi	Sreejith Ravi, Aarya Arun, T. G. Ravi, Shivaji Guruvayoor	Neelambari Productions	
JULY	3	Velolthsavam	P Chandrakumar	P Chandrakumar, Krithika Gireesh, Paloor Rajkumar, Anitha Nambar	Face Guru Legends Film Academy	
JULY	4	Friday Trip	Musthafa Parayil	Alsabith, Praveen, Surya Lal, Rajani Murali, Pooja Raju	Johny Pictures	
JULY	8	Thee Puka Charam	Shiyas Jas	Bithul Babu Chacko, Deepthy Krishna, Elizabeth, Satheesh Kunnath	Raeian Entertainment	
JULY	9	I, Nobody	Nisam Basheer	Prithviraj Sukumaran, Parvathy Thiruvothu, Vijayaraghavan	Prithviraj Productions, E4 Experiments	
JULY	10	Daayam	Prasanth Vijay	Aathira Rajeev, Pradeep Kumar, Ranjini George, Rini Udayakumar	One Pixel Revolution	
JULY	10	Mazara	Ali Arikath	Harif Hasain, Subair K J Nazer Mamburam, Suhaib Paramban Shaeer Amayur, Induchandra, Rami P R	Naz Productions	
JULY	12	Oru Vadakkan Velicham	Akhil Suresh	Harish Menon, Anandakrishnan Thiruvallor, Peter Kaz, Surabhi Suresh Babu, Anurenjini P	Flurries Film House	
JULY	16	Varavu	Shaji Kailas	Joju George, Arjun Ashokan, Murali Gopi, Saniya Iyappan	Olga Productions	
JULY	17	Antappante Athbutha Pravarthikal	Vipin Atley	Vipin Atley, Sreeja Das, Sajid Yahiya, Ranjini Menon	Ma Crom Pictures	
JULY	17	Achyuta Avataaram	Punith Aradhya	Malavika Nandan, Avinash Yelandur, Seema G Nair, Vishnu Vijayan	Rayra Ventures	
JULY	19	Rotten Society	S.S. Jishnu Dev	T Sunil Punnakkad, Prince Johnson, Manasa Prabhu, Jinu Celine, Gautham S Kumar, Snehal Rao, Aattukal Ramesh , Aaradhya	Varaha Films, Independent Cinema Box	
JULY	24	Maharaja Hostel	Charu Wakan	Akhil NRD, Akhil Shah, Sharath Babu, Sajin Cherukayil, Ann Maria	Madhumitha Productions, Mansoon Tales	
JULY	24	Lurk	M. A. Nishad	Saiju Kurup, Anumol, Aju Varghese, Manju Pillai	Kerala Talkies, Elite Group Companies, Brick Street & Co, Zenz Adventure Tours	
JULY	24	Triple Decker	Krishnanunni Mangalath	Akhil Sreekumaran, Vaishnavi, Gowri Kutty, Saji Sopnam, Venkitaraman R.K, Sreekumar R Nair	Harshini Films	
JULY	30	Pluto	Adithyan Chandrashekar	Neeraj Madhav, Althaf Salim, Aju Varghese, Aarsha Chandini Baiju, Dinesh Prabhakar, Vineeth Thattil David	Orchid Films International	
JULY	31	Unmadham	Kiran Das	Kunchacko Boban, Lijomol Jose, Raina Radhakrishnan, Sudheesh, Vishak Nair	Panorama Studios	
JULY	31	Kandan	Jibin Antony	Jyothish Jose, Rejeena Dvidson, Santhosh Varghese	Fourth Wall Pictures	
AUGUST	7	Thudakkam	Jude Anthany Joseph	Vismaya Mohanlal, Mohanlal, Ashish Joe Antony, Bobby Kurian, Sai Kumar, K. B. Ganesh Kumar, Manoj K. Jayan, Miya George	Aashirvad Cinemas	
AUGUST	7	Karimbadam	Amladh Jaleel	Anaz Sainudeen, Theertha Haridev, Jessan Joseph, Aneesh Ponnappan	Eshal Creations	
AUGUST	7	Vivaah	Blessin Elssa	Dhyan Sreenivasan, Nayana Elza, Dhruvan, Sruthy Jayan, Naira Nihar	Selrin Productions	
AUGUST	14	Madhuramee Jeevitham	Mathew Scaria	Siddique, Vinaya Prasad, Poojitha Menon, Gayathri Suresh	Good Day Movies	
AUGUST	14	Aali	Krishna Priyadarshan	Kailash, Prajin Padmanabhan, Letha Sunil, Krishna Priyadarshan	Manhar Cinemas	
AUGUST	20	Khalifa: The Ruler	Vysakh	Prithviraj Sukumaran, Mohanlal, Tovino Thomas, Neil Nitin Mukesh, Malvika Sharma	Jiinu Abraham Innovation, Saregama Films, Yoodlee Films	
AUGUST	20	Maayunnu, Maarivarayunnu, Nisvaasangalil...	Abhilash Babu	Pradeep Kumar, Surya S, Kenshin, Gauthami Kaur, Aromal T, Sherin Catherine	The Weekend Academia	
AUGUST	21	Bethlehem Kudumba Unit	Girish A. D.	Nivin Pauly, Mamitha Baiju, Sangeeth Prathap, Roshan Shanavas, Shyam Mohan, Suresh Krishna	Bhavana Studios	
AUGUST	27	The Steering	Mohammed Sadik	Mamukkoya, Sajitha Madathil, Jose Raphael, Vinod Kumar	Media Ravan	
SEPTEMBER	3	I'm Game	Nahas Hidhayath	Dulquer Salmaan, Antony Varghese, Mysskin, Kayadu Lohar, Samyuktha Viswanathan, Kathir, Vinay Forrt, Parth Tiwari	Wayfarer Films	
SEPTEMBER	11	Pradhama Drishtiya Kuttakkar	Shahad Nilambur	Parvathy Thiruvothu, Mathew Thomas, R. Parthiban, Sidharth Bharathan, Vijayaraghavan, Unnimaya Prasad	11 Icons Film Productions	
SEPTEMBER	11	Aasha	Safar Sanal	Urvashi, Joju George, Aishwarya Lekshmi	Ajith Vinayaka Films	
SEPTEMBER	11	Ozhiyathe	Farook Abdulrahiman	KK Kuzhalmannam, Latha Mohan, Vishnu Kavassery	Insight Creative Group	
SEPTEMBER	11	Arayanum Amarakkarum	V V Wilfred	Indrans, Chembil Ashokan, Divya Nair, Kumarakam Raghunath	Bright Production, Samanwaya Vision	
SEPTEMBER	18	It's a Medical Miracle	Shyamin Gireesh	Sangeeth Prathap, Sharaf U Dheen, Akhila Bhargavan, Parvathy Krishna	Dream Big Films, Dr. Paul's Entertainment	
SEPTEMBER	18	Daivathan Kunnu	Joshy Mathew	Dinesh Prabhakar, Somu Mathew, Artist Sujathan, Jincy	Soma Creations	
SEPTEMBER	18	Law and Order	Ranjith	Prakash Varma, Abhirami, Gayathri Ashok, Mammootty	Satyam Cinemas, Mahasubair Moviekshetra	
SEPTEMBER	18	Ottam Thullal	G. Marthandan	Vishnu Unnikrishnan, Chithra Nair, Tini Tom, Kalabhavan Shajon	GKS Productions	
SEPTEMBER	25	Dhoomakethu	Sudhi Maddison	Sajin Gopu, Nikhila Vimal, Ganapathi S. Poduval, Manju Pillai	Happy Hours Entertainments, A & HS Production House	
SEPTEMBER	25	Aaram	Rajesh Parameswaran	Saiju Kurup, Anju Kurian, Askar Ali	Good Hope Productions	
SEPTEMBER	25	Amanushikam	Nitheesh K	Joemon Joshy, Annmary Roy, Saju Navodaya	Namo Pictures	

== October–December ==
Opening		Title	Director	Cast	Production company / studio	Ref
OCTOBER	2	Avaraachan & Sons	Thamby	Biju Menon, Sreenath Bhasi, Ganapathi S. Poduval, Akhila Bhargavan, Parvathy Babu, Grace Antony, Vinay Forrt	Magic Frames	
OCTOBER	2	Izhakalkkappuram	Venu Nair	Dinesh Panicker, Gautam Karthi, Praveen Kumar	Venu Nair Productions	
OCTOBER	2	The Third Murder	Sunil Ibrahim	Saiju Kurup, Ananya, Vinay Forrt, Leona Lishoy	Swarnalaya Cinemas	
OCTOBER	9	Aarambham Oru Albaniyo Katha	Sreejith M	Nidhin Raj, Faris Salman, Augustijose, Vijesh Venmanal, Shaju Shankar, Ganga Iyer, Ishani Krishnan	Vana Sree Creations, OMC Entertainments, Wonderba Motion Pictures	
OCTOBER	9	Chiram	Sindhu Paradayil	Anoop Menon, Aishwarya Midhun, Shelly Kishore, Srikant Murali	Sathyajith Productions	
OCTOBER	9	Dhanushkodiyilekku	Jahangir Ummar	Sudheer Karamana, Nisthar Ahammed, Ardra Gopakumar	Ganga Productions	
OCTOBER	9	Poru: Oru Tharam Randu Tharam	Anish Urumbil	Bibin George, Lenaa, Johny Antony	Bat Bros International, MJN Creations	
OCTOBER	9	Randu Rahasyangal	Ajithkumar Raveendran, Arjun Lal	Sekhar Menon, Paris Lakshmi, Rajesh Sharma	Wama Entertainment, Hyzin Global Ventures.	
OCTOBER	16	Prekshakarude Sradhaykku	Nowshad Nissar	Jenson Alappat, Hemanth Menon, Eldho Mathew, Anwar Sadath	Mascot Movie Makers	
OCTOBER	22	Titans	Prince Joy	Jayasurya, Vinayakan, Sunny Wayne, Manohari Joy	Nerambokku, Manuel Movie Makers, Avanir Tech, Babu Ettan Films	
OCTOBER	23	Orijinal	Ramees Mohamed	Sreenath Bhasi, Femina George, Rajesh Madhavan	Maz Media, Ziku Films	
OCTOBER	23	Crime 302	Sajeer Sainudeen	Siddique, Saju Navodaya, Dinesh Panicker	Nisha & Sara Productions	
OCTOBER	23	Ente Kalyanam Oru Mahasambhavam	Madhu K Krishnan	Jain Paul, Manju Pathrose, Sunil Sukhada, Reshmi Anil	Saraswathy Films	
OCTOBER	23	Udumbanchola Vision	Salaam Bhukaari	Mathew Thomas, Sreenath Bhasi, Chaithania Prakash, Milind Soman	A&R Media Labs, UB Productions	
OCTOBER	30	Geriga	Bhaskar Bantupalli	Rishan Sha, Neeblha Bala, Anjana Nair	Vonamali Projects	
OCTOBER	30	Spring	Sreelal Narayanan	Adil Ibrahim, Aradhya Aan, Poojitha Menon, Yami Sona, Unni Lalu	Silver Screen Entertainment, Lime Tea Productions	
OCTOBER	30	Jennifer In	Althaf Rahman	Swasika, Binu Dev, Rari Krishna	Naduvattom Productions	
OCTOBER	30	Samarasa	Baburaj Bhakthapriyam	Akhila Nath, Dinesh Pattath, Hareesh Peradi, Malavika Shaji	Sankalpa Frames	
OCTOBER	30	Udayam Kathu	K. Padmakrishna	Bindu Jayan, Sunita, Deepthi Dev, Jishnu Bijoy, Moses Thomas	Official Guardians	
NOVEMBER	6	Disco	Ullas Chemban	Antony Varghese, Arjun Ashokan, Femina George, Gayathri Suresh	Chembosky Motion Pictures, Phars Films	
NOVEMBER	6	Tony Xavier	Don Jose	Vijeesh Vijayan, Parvathy Rajan, Sreeparvathi Sreekumar, Remya Krishnan, Sreekumar Podiyan	Black Coffee Cinemas	
NOVEMBER	12	Bouma	Rejin S Babu	Dileesh Pothan, Vineeth, Sagar Surya, Aditi Bslan, Mokksha Sengupta	Atus Films	
NOVEMBER	12	Melcow Pondicherry	Nikhil Mohan	Arjun Ashokan, Balu Varghese, Althaf Salim, Sarath Sabha, Sreelakshmi Vijayan, Anna Susan	Arun Gopy Excitements; Justin & Mathew Entertainments	
NOVEMBER	12	Madhumozhi	Vikraman Namboothiri	Balaji Subramanyam, Yuvan Shankar Raja, Renji Panicker	Arsham Movies	
NOVEMBER	14	Khushi - The Princess of the Jungle	Sunith M S	Aiswarya Nair, Veena U, Sreenath S S, Sreenayana T S, Suraj Venjaramoodu (Note: Voice artists and narration)	Malayala Manorama Television Ltd	
NOVEMBER	19	Bachelor Party D'eux	Amal Neerad	Naslen, Kunchacko Boban, Soubin Shahir, Tovino Thomas, Sharaf U Dheen, Shine Tom Chacko	Amal Neerad Productions, Anwar Rasheed Entertainment, Fahadh Faasil and Friends	
NOVEMBER	20	Orange Marangalude Veedu	Dr. Biju	Nedumudi Venu, P. Balachandran, Prakash Bare, Lali P M	Movie Nomads, Silicon Media, Invis Multimedia	
NOVEMBER	26	Hail Mary	Vishnu Revikumar	Kunchacko Boban, Suraj Venjaramoodu, Anu Sithara, Jagadish	Martin Prakkat Films, Green Room Productions	
NOVEMBER	27	Cosmic Samson	Abhijith Joseph	Sandeep Pradeep, Mukesh, Miya George, Althaf Salim, Alphonse Puthren	Weekend Blockbusters	
DECEMBER	3	Mayan: Chapter 1	Jithin K. Jose	Jayasurya, Gibin Gopinath, Aiswarya Raj, Nyla Usha, Aarsha Chandini Baiju, Niranjana Anoop	Magic Moon Productions	
DECEMBER	11	Paathira Kurukkan	Jayesh Venugopal	Jagadish, Mukesh, Siddique, Ashokan	Appai Cinemas	
