= Hridayapoorvam (soundtrack) =

Soundtrack album by Justin Prabhakaran
- Released: 7 September 2025
- Recorded: 2024–2025
- Studio: 2 BarQ Studios, Chennai; 20db Sound Studios, Chennai; Studio Uno Records, Chennai; Studio 504, Mumbai
- Genre: Feature film soundtrack
- Length: 20:49
- Language: Malayalam; Hindi
- Label: Aashirvad Cinemas

Justin Prabhakaran chronology
Aap Jaisa Koi (2025)	Hridayapoorvam (2025)	Thandakaaranyam (2025)

Singles from Hridayapoorvam
- 1. "Venmathi" Released: 17 August 2025

Hridayapoorvam is the soundtrack album to the 2025 Malayalam-language romantic comedy-drama film of the same name directed by Sathyan Anthikad and produced by Aashirvad Cinemas, starring Mohanlal, Malavika Mohanan, Sangita Madhavan Nair and Sangeeth Prathap. The film's soundtrack and score were composed by Justin Prabhakaran and featured four songs written by Manu Manjith and Raj Shekhar. The album was released by the production company itself on 7 September 2025.

== Background ==
The film's music was composed by Justin Prabhakaran, in his first collaboration with Mohanlal and Anthikad. The latter liked the songs composed by Prabhakaran for his son Akhil Sathyan's directorial debut film Pachuvum Athbutha Vilakkum (2023). When Anthikad approached Prabhakaran regarding his involvement in the film during October 2024, he came to Kerala and composed all the songs within a week itself. In the film, "music plays a vital role, as even deeply emotional moments need to be handled lightly or pleasantly."

Anthikad noted that Prabhakaran combined the qualities of Johnson, Ilaiyaraaja and Vidyasagar, whom he had often collaborated with, in terms of melody, soul and novelty and appreciated his working style enhancing the mood of each scene that often exceeded his expectations. The songs were performed by Sid Sriram, S. P. Charan, Navaneeth Unnikrishnan and Madhushree. Singer Balram had recorded one song for the film during August 2025. The recording and mixing of the film's background score was completed by 22 August 2025.

== Release ==
The film's first single "Venmathi" was released as the lead single from the album on 17 August 2025. The soundtrack album was released through the production company itself on 7 September.

== Reception ==
Avinash Ramachandran of The New Indian Express wrote "Justin Prabhakaran's soundtrack, is how the film answers a lot of questions about Sandeep, some of which we didn't even think of asking". Sia Viju of Mathrubhumi wrote "Justin Prabhakaran's songs and background score enrich the emotional beats while keeping the energy consistent." A reviewer based at Moneycontrol wrote "Justin Prabhakaran's music complements the mood". Anna Mathews of The Times of India wrote "Justin Prabhakaran's music is just right, with very hummable tracks."

== Track listing ==
No.	Title	Lyrics	Singer(s)	Length
1.	"Venmathi"	Manu Manjith	Sid Sriram	3:37
2.	"Hridayavathil"	Manu Manjith	S. P. Charan	3:38
3.	"Vida Parayaam"	Manu Manjith	Navaneeth Unnikrishnan	4:00
4.	"Karayathe"	Manu Manjith	Balram	4:00
5.	"Hridayame"	Manu Manjith	Yadu Krishnan K, Kiran Biju, Gopikrishna, Suroor Musthafa, Aishwarya Kumar, Narmada KS, Indu Sanath, Feji	1:43
6.	"Tuk Tuk Tuk Tu"	Raj Shekhar	Madhushree	3:50
Total length:				20:49

== Personnel ==
Credits adapted from Aashirvad Cinemas:

- Music composer, producer and arranger – Justin Prabhakaran
- Additional programming – Sebastian Sathish, Beven Elankumaran, Dishon Prince, Barath Dhanasekar
- Additional rhythm arrangements – Barath Dhanasekar
- Backing vocals – Feji, Indu Sanath, Devu Mathew, Gayathry Rajiv, Yadu Krishnan K, Kiran Biju, Gopikrishna, Suroor Musthafa, Aishwarya Kumar, Umesh Joshi, Janardan Dhatrak, Vijay Dhuri, Siddhant Karawde, Yashad Ghanekar, Pragati Joshi, Aditi Prabhudesai, Madhura Paranjape, Sharmishtha Bhatkar, Rajeshwari Gaikwad, Sridhar Ramesh, Shenbagaraj, Sreenathan Kattungal, Renjith Unni, Padmaja Sreenivasan, Aparna Harikumar
- A cappella vocals – Shibi Srinivasan
- Electric guitar and cavaquinho – Abinandan R David
- Acoustic guitar, mandolin and oud – Abinandan R David, Subhani S M
- Bass guitar – Naveen Napier
- Sitar – L. Kishore Kumar
- Dhol, bass dhol and dholak – Kaviraj, Ramana, Barath Dhanasekar, Karthik Vamsi
- Drum tech – Mariyappan
- Flute – P Vijay Ananth
- Banjo, ruan, saz and ukulele – Subhani S M
- Tabla and percussions – Shruthiraj
- Strings – Budapest Scoring Orchestra
- String conductor – Abel
- Session producer – Bálint Sapszon
- Orchestra representative – Balasubramanian G.
- Orchestra recording engineer – Bence Bobak
- Studio assistant – Marcell Rokosz
- Librarian – Ágnes Sapszon, Kati Reti
- Orchestrator – Beven Elankumaran
- Vocals editor – Shree Shankar (Pitch Worxx, Kochi)
- Music coordinators – Antony Raj (The Station Inn, Chennai), Nirmal Raj (Hymn Studio, Kochi)
- Recording engineers – Vishnu Raj MR (2 BarQ Studios, Chennai), Hariharan (20db Sound Studios, Chennai), Thanushree N (Studio Uno Records, Chennai), Rahul M Sharma (Studio 504, Mumbai)
- Mixing – Balu Thankachan (20db Black, Chennai)
- Session assistance – Paul Daniel J, Sreenivasa Sharma, Iker Subu, Priyank Tayal
- Mastering – Shadab Rayeen (New Edge Studios, Mumbai)
