= Ranjitha (name) =

Ranjitha is a given name. Notable people with the name include:

- Ranjitha, Indian actress
- Ranjitha Menon, Indian actress
