= Ashakal Aayiram =

2026 Indian Malayalam-language family comedy drama film

- Theatrical release poster
- Directed by: G. Prajith
- Written by: Jude Anthany Joseph; Aravind Rajendran
- Produced by: Gokulam Gopalan; Krishnamoorthy
- Starring: Jayaram; Kalidas Jayaram; Asha Sharath; Sharaf U Dheen
- Cinematography: Swaroop Philip
- Edited by: Shafeeque V. B.
- Music by: Sanal Dev
- Production company: Sree Gokulam Movies
- Distributed by: Dream Big Films
- Release date: 6 February 2026
- Country: India
- Language: Malayalam

Ashakal Aayiram is a 2026 Indian Malayalam-language family comedy drama film directed by G. Prajith and written by Jude Anthany Joseph and Aravind Rajendran. The film is produced by Gokulam Gopalan and Krishnamoorthy under the banner of Sree Gokulam Movies. The film stars Jayaram and Kalidas Jayaram in lead roles alongside Asha Sharath, Sharaf U Dheen

== Plot ==
Ashakal Aayiram focuses on the dynamics of a father-son relationship, portraying the everyday struggles, dreams, misunderstandings and emotional reconciliation between the characters played by Jayaram and Kalidas Jayaram. The trailer highlights both humour and heartfelt moments, positioning the film as a relatable family entertainer.

== Cast ==
- Jayaram as Hariharan
- Kalidas Jayaram as Ajeesh Hariharan
- Asha Sharath as Asha Hariharan
- Sharaf U Dheen as Sumith Raghavan
- Ishaani Krishna as Riya
- Anand Manmadhan
- Akhil NRD
- Ramesh Pisharody
- Mukundan
- Rafi
- Suresh Kumar
- Gokulam Gopalan
- Vipin Atley
- Arjun Gopal
- Nandan Unni
- Dileep Menon
- Zhins Shan

== Production ==
The film was officially announced in mid-2025, and principal photography began following a traditional pooja ceremony held in Kochi. Ashakal Aayiram marks yet another on-screen collaboration between father and son duo Jayaram and Kalidas Jayaram, their fourth after earlier films including Kochu Kochu Santhoshangal and Ente Veedu Appuvinteyum.

== Music ==
The soundtrack and background score for Ashakal Aayiram were composed by Sanal Dev, with the score expected to complement both the emotional and lighthearted aspects of the narrative. The soundtrack also included remix version of 'Pathinalam Ravinte' from 2001 film Sharjah to Sharjah.

== Release ==
=== Theatrical ===
Ashakal Aayiram was released theatrically on 6 February 2026. The film received a clean U certificate from the Central Board of Film Certification.

=== Home Media ===
The digital rights of the film is acquired by ZEE5 and started streaming from 17 April 2026.

== Reception ==
Ashakal Aayiram received mixed reviews from critics.

The Times of India rated the film 3 out of 5 stars and noted that "Jayaram's performance carries an otherwise uneven family drama".

The Hindu described the film as a "breezy feel-good drama" and stated that Jayaram is "in form", adding that the film falters towards the end.

The Indian Express gave the film 2.5 out of 5 stars and wrote that the Jayaram and Kalidas Jayaram-starrer is "undone by melodrama" despite its premise.

OTTPlay called the film a "feel-good love letter to cinema and family" that "hits home".

The Hollywood Reporter India stated that the film brings back "the Jayaram we missed" in what it described as a "wholesome Anthikadian comedy".

India Today described the film as a family drama centred on passion and ego, headlined by Jayaram and Kalidas.

Onmanorama, in its review of the Jayaram–Kalidas starrer, highlighted the film's family drama elements and emotional conflicts.

The New Indian Express wrote that Jayaram "anchors an uneven film that plays it safe".
