= Saajan Bakery Since 1962 =

2020 film by Arun Chandu

- Poster
- Directed by: Arun Chandu
- Written by: Arun Chandu; Sachin R Chandran; Aju Varghese
- Produced by: Dhyan Sreenivasan; Visakh Subramaniam
- Starring: Aju Varghese; Lena; K. B. Ganesh Kumar; Ranjitha Menon; Grace Antony
- Cinematography: Guru Prasad M.G
- Edited by: Aravind Manmadhan
- Music by: Prashant Pillai
- Production company: Funtastic Films
- Distributed by: Funtastic Films; Amazon Prime Video
- Release date: 12 February 2021
- Running time: 124 minutes
- Country: India
- Language: Malayalam

Saajan Bakery Since 1962 is a 2021 Indian Malayalam-language family drama film directed by Arun Chandu. The film stars Aju Varghese, K. B. Ganesh Kumar, Lena, Ranjita Menon and Grace Antony. The film was written by Arun Chandu, Sachin R Chandran and Aju Varghese, and produced by Dhyan Sreenivasan and Visakh Subramaniam under the banner Funtastic Films. The film was initially scheduled to release on 21 February 2020 but was postponed. The film premiered on 12 February 2021.

== Plot ==
Two siblings, Betsy and Bobin, and their maternal uncle, Cherian, run their family Bakery in Ranni. The bakery was started by Betsy and Bobin's father Saajan. Bobin is not a responsible man preferring to while away time with friends, drinking and hoping to emigrate to Australia one day. Betsy is separated from her husband, Michael. There were no children in the marriage. Betsy is hard working and runs the bakery efficiently. Bobin tries hard to convince her to go in for a divorce or reconciliation, a subject she avoids, frustrating Bobin. He doesn't want to emigrate leaving her with incomplete matters in her hand.

Merin who works in a diagnostic lab is attracted to Bobin and messages the bakery number thinking that it is Bobby's personal number. Bobby doesn't get to see the message, but Betsy does and is intrigued by the message. The messages are flirtish in nature and Betsy thinks it must be her estranged husband Michael. Her demeanor undergoes a change and she becomes a happier person from her usual bad tempered self. Bobin finds out that Merin's message to him was received by Betsy and request Merin to continue messaging her in the hope that Betsy might reconcile with Michael. Betsy finally decides to meet Michael and try to reconcile their differences. She makes Bobin drive her to Theni where Michael lives and after meeting him realizes that it was not Michael sending her the WhatsApp messages. Betsy is humiliated and ashamed at her error in judgment and leaves Theni in tears. Michael advises her to move on with her life.

Betsy goes to meet someone and Bobin calls her and scolds her for being away from home without telling him. Betsy breaks down and tells Cherian that Bobin was just like her deceased father, unfeeling and domineering. She leaves the bakery enrolls herself in IELTS classes without telling anyone as she realizes she needs to move on with her life.

Bobin and Merin's romance is rocky due to his personality that is like his father's. She tolerates him but when he keeps mentioning Merin's past relationship with Abhilash, she has had enough. She also decides to tell her ultra religious parents about Bobin and is kicked out of the house. She leaves for Bangalore because she realize that it was not worth pursuing a relationship with a man like Bobin.

Meanwhile, the bakery is not doing well and Bobin requests his classmate to sell some of Saajan bakery's products in their bakery. The bakery is owned by his classmates father Benjamin. Benjamin asks him to make cream buns that Saajan bakery was so famous for. Bobin makes really bad cream buns using a recipe from a YouTube video. Without much time to make and give cream buns to Benjamin, he buys some buns from Benjamins shop and tries to pass it off as his product. Benjamin tells him to be honest like his father was. Betsy and Bobin make up and Betsy makes the cream buns that Bobin takes to the owner who agrees to sell them in his bakery shop.

Bobin realizes his follies and goes to Bangalore to try and reconciles with Merin. Betsy formalizes her divorce and migrates to the United Kingdom.

== Cast ==
- Aju Varghese as Bobin P Sajan and Sajan (dual role)
- Lena as Betsy P Sajan
- Ranjitha Menon as Merin
- Grace Antony as Mary
- K. B. Ganesh Kumar as Cherian a.k.a. Ammaachan
- Sunder Ramu as Michel
- Jaffar Idukki as Benchamin Muthalali
- Jayan Cherthala as Philipose
- Bhagath Manuel as Tharagan Muthalali
- Ramesh Pisharody as Thomas, James Malampally's son

== Production ==
Filming began on 1 December 2019.

== Soundtrack ==
Saajan Bakery Since 1962

Soundtrack album by Prashant Pillai
- Released: 8 September 2020
- Genre: Soundtrack
- Length: 7:49
- Language: Malayalam
- Label: Muzik247
- Producer: Prashant Pillai

Prashant Pillai chronology
Chappad Phaad Ke (2019)	Saajan Bakery Since 1962 (2020)	Taish (2020)
External audio
- Music video song on YouTube

Singles from Saajan Bakery Since 1962
- 1. "Once Upon A Time" Released: 3 September 2020; 2. "Thora Mazhayilum" Released: 8 September 2020

"Once Upon A Time In Ranni" song release on 3 September 2020. "Thora Mazhayilum" song released on 8 September 2020. All songs labeled by Muzik247.

All music is composed by Prashant Pillai.

No.	Title	Lyrics	Singer(s)	Length
1.	"Once Upon A Time In Ranni"	Vinayak Sasikumar	James Thakara	4:23
2.	"Thora Mazhayilum"	Anu Elizabeth Jose	Vineeth Sreenivasan	3:26
