= Poacher (TV series) =

- Official release poster
- Genre: Crime drama
- Created by: Richie Mehta
- Written by: Richie Mehta; Gopan Chidambaran
- Directed by: Richie Mehta
- Starring: Nimisha Sajayan; Roshan Mathew; Dibyendu Bhattacharya; Ankith Madhav
- Country of origin: India
- Original language: Malayalam
- No. of episodes: 8

Production
- Executive producers: Alia Bhatt; Prerna Singh; Edward H. Hamm Jr.; Raymond Mansfield
- Cinematography: Johan Heurlin Aidt
- Editors: Beverley Mills; Susan Shipton; Justin Li
- Production companies: QC Entertainment; Suitable Pictures; Poor Man’s Productions; Eternal Sunshine Productions

Original release
- Network: Amazon Prime Video
- Release: 28 January 2023 – 23 February 2024

Poacher is an Indian Malayalam-language crime drama miniseries created by Richie Mehta. Starring Nimisha Sajayan, Roshan Mathew, Dibyendu Bhattacharya, Ankith Madhav, Kani Kusruti, Ranjitha Menon and Maala Parvathi, the series explores the issue of ivory poaching in India. The first three episodes premiered at the 2023 Sundance Film Festival, and on 23 February 2024, the series was released on Amazon Prime Video and received positive reviews from critics.

Set in 2015, the series is based on true events of ivory poaching that took place in Malayattoor, Vazhachal and Munnar forest divisions of Kerala, which had alleged involvement of transnational crime syndicates triads and yakuza, and the subsequent government action known as Operation Shikkar.

== Cast ==
- Nimisha Sajayan as Mala Jogi
- Roshan Mathew as Alan Joseph
- Dibyendu Bhattacharya as Neel Banerjee
- Kani Kusruti as DFO Dina
- Ankith Madhav as Vijay Babu
- Ranjitha Menon as Achala Joseph, Alan's wife
- Maala Parvathi as Roshni, Mala's mother
- Denzil Smith as Nilesh Sharma, Chief Wildlife Warden
- Vinod Sharawat as Kishore Kumar
- Hannah Reji Koshy as Abilasha
- Noorudheen Ali Ahmed as Raaz
- Kumaradas T N as Santosh, Forest Officer
- Zhinz Shan as Yadu
- Sooraj Pops as Aruku
- Praveen T.J as Poyya
- Amal Rajdev as Morris Finn
- Arjun Radhakrishnan Ambat as Forest Officer Krishna

== Reception ==
Saibal Chatterjee of NDTV gave 4 stars out of 5 and wrote in his review that it is a welcome diversion from the meaningless bravado and empty talk that the terrorists, cops, spies, gangsters, traitors, and patriots that we typically witness in Indian web series. The poacher is full of life and not prone to excesses. It knows just when and how to land it and packs a powerful blow. Shubhra Gupta of The Indian Express gave 3 stars out of 5 and said the way the act of poaching is portrayed makes it clear that writer-director Richie Mehta has done extensive study on the issue. Its cast selection demonstrates how much care has been taken to keep it grounded and real. Vinamra Mathur of the Firstpost writes in her review that Poacher is one of the few instances where the gripping story makes you both uncomfortable and glued to the screen. Sometimes the intent is sufficient on its own, but Poacher takes the appropriate intent and executes it well. It forces you to keep your face hidden while watching what transpires.
