= Patriot (film) =

2026 Indian film by Mahesh Narayanan

- Theatrical release poster
- Directed by: Mahesh Narayanan
- Written by: Mahesh Narayanan
- Produced by: Anto Joseph; K. G. Anil Kumar
- Starring: Mammootty; Mohanlal; Fahadh Faasil; Kunchacko Boban; Nayanthara; Revathi; Darshana Rajendran; Rajiv Menon
- Cinematography: Manush Nandan
- Edited by: Mahesh Narayanan; Rahul Radhakrishnan
- Music by: Sushin Shyam
- Production companies: Anto Joseph Film Company; Kichappus Entertainments; C R Saleem Productions; Blue Tigers London
- Distributed by: Aan Mega Media; Pen Marudhar
- Release date: 1 May 2026
- Running time: 180 minutes
- Country: India
- Language: Malayalam
- Budget: ₹140 crore
- Box office: ₹80 crore

Patriot is a 2026 Indian Malayalam-language spy action thriller film written, co-edited, and directed by Mahesh Narayanan. It was produced by Anto Joseph and K. G. Anil Kumar. The film stars an ensemble cast including Mammootty, Mohanlal, Fahadh Faasil, Kunchacko Boban, Nayanthara, Revathi, Darshana Rajendran, and Rajiv Menon. The soundtrack was composed by Sushin Shyam.

Patriot was released worldwide on 1 May 2026 and received mixed reviews from critics. Despite being the fifth highest grossing Malayalam-language film of 2026, the film was a box office bomb.

== Plot ==
Periscope is a military-grade spyware secretly bought by the Indian government and used against citizens for surveillance and blackmail. Home Minister Nalini Ramakrishnan confronts Defense Minister J.P. Sundaram and threatens to expose the illegal use of Periscope after he uses it for a civilian case against him. Before undergoing surgery, Nalini secretly meets Dr. Daniel James, a Defence Research Wing scientist who helped authorise Periscope, and reveals that Sundaram plans to transfer the spyware's control to his son Shakthi's IT company, Shakthi Solutions. She asks Daniel to retrieve the complete list of targeted citizens.

Daniel secretly smuggles the data and begins investigating the misuse of Periscope with the help of his wife, Dr. Ayesha Iqbal; and Dr. Scott Jenkins in the UK. Jenkins offers Daniel a teaching position in London, which he tells to give him some time to decide. During their investigation, Daniel learns that Nalini mysteriously died from a sudden infection after surgery, making him suspect foul play. He later attends a summit hosted by Shakthi Solutions and meets Shakthi Sundaram, a tech entrepreneur. Shakthi was once an Air Force cadet who Daniel and his assistant Michael Devassy saved during a cockpit fire years earlier, though JPS later forced him to leave the Air Force and enter tech for political gain.

Daniel informs DRW chief Sreedharan that he possesses the Periscope target list and intends to expose the entire operation if it is privatised. However, Sreedharan betrays him by informing JPS, who targets Daniel. After being chased, Daniel escapes, resigns, and accepts the teaching job in London. He uploads a vlog under the alias “Vimathan” (“Dissident”) and admits that Periscope was sanctioned under him. He exposes Periscope's use against citizens, including Nalini, and leaks the entire surveillance list online.

One year later, Daniel lives in exile in London with Ayesha, working as a professor while running a popular YouTube channel focused on digital privacy. During one of his broadcasts, he discusses Athira, a 16-year-old girl falsely accused of selling explicit photos online after using a government-issued laptop. Her father, trapped in debt from a loan app owned by Shakthi Solutions, commits suicide after the scandal. Daniel publicly accuses Shakthi Solutions of exploitation, and later receives the phone of Jyothi Kurian.

Michael was involved in a relationship with Jyothi. She worked as his secretary at Shakthi Solutions. Jyothi was also responsible for providing free laptops to students, including Athira. When Athira's father committed suicide, his wife approached Jyothi for answers. While helping Athira's family, Jyothi discovers that Periscope was hidden in the government-issued laptops and learns from Michael that Shakthi Solutions has unrestricted access to users’ devices. When Jyothi uncovers evidence linking the company directly to Periscope, Shakthi orders Michael to ensure that she “doesn’t speak to anyone.” After Michael asks Jyothi to back down, she refuses and cuts ties with him. Michael discovers her phone has also been hacked. Soon afterward, she mysteriously dies, and Daniel later realises both Jyothi and Nalini were likely assassinated using VX nerve poisoning.

Determined to expose Shakthi publicly, Daniel attends a YouTubers’ summit and plans to expose Shakthi's control of Periscope through a document. Furious, Shakthi shuts down the event. With his opportunity to expose Shakthi lost, Daniel and Ayesha reach the airport to head back to London. Daniel has lotion applied on his face as part of a prank. Ayesha discovers Daniel was kidnapped after he stepped into a washroom after feeling ill and that the lotion was VX nerve agent. Meanwhile, Daniel awakens aboard a cargo aircraft transporting him to India. He had predicted an attack on him and took an antidote to negate the nerve agent. Despite being weakened, he fights off the kidnappers and escapes by parachuting into the Arabian Sea near Karnataka and is rescued by fishermen. The kidnapping was orchestrated by JPS. After his father's failure, Shakthi launches a nationwide hunt to track down Daniel. Shakthi realises that Daniel will seek the help of his old friend Colonel Rahim Naik, whom Daniel later contacts. After Daniel arrives, Sreedharan sends agents to Rahim's house while Daniel hides in his basement.

Shakthi discovers the Periscope document was leaked to Daniel by Michael, who defects and joins Daniel and Rahim. While being hunted, they reach a military nursing home in Kannur, where Daniel has to undergo a blood transfusion to remove any remaining poison. Daniel requests Rahim ensure Athira's safety and preserve her testimony against Shakthi Solutions; Rahim leaves for Kochi. While undergoing the transfusion, Daniel instructs Michael to use Periscope against its creators to publicly expose their crimes.

Meanwhile, Rahim and his team arrive at the hospital where Athira is being treated. After assassins follow them to the hospital, Rahim manages to divert them and Athira escapes; Rahim is stabbed multiple times and killed. Danny and Michael rush to the hospital upon hearing the news. Danny checks the CCTV footage and notices that Rahim has revealed Athira's location through Morse code, deducing it to be Jyothi's apartment.

After Daniel and Michael publicly expose the crimes of Periscope, protests erupt outside Shakthi Solutions. Shakthi orders the destruction of every company server and hard disk. During a hacked phone call with JPS, Shakthi reveals that the cockpit fire incident had been orchestrated by his father. Michael confirms that he had known parts of the truth for years, explaining both his loyalty and guilt to Shakthi. Shakthi orders JPS to commit suicide so that he may die as a martyr rather than live in disgrace, which JPS obeys.

As protestors storm the corporate building, Michael uploads the evidence before it can be destroyed, leading to a confrontation with Shakthi. Daniel arrives and offers Shakthi one last chance to confess publicly, but he refuses. Daniel ultimately sprays VX nerve agent on him. Shakthi runs away. However, protestors chase him, killing him in a crash. In the aftermath, Michael testifies in court against Shakthi Solutions and exposes the Periscope operation, while Daniel returns to Delhi and demands that Rahim be added to the National War Memorial.

At the memorial ceremony, Sreedharan praises Daniel as a “Great Indian.” Daniel ponders whether history will remember him as a traitor or a patriot.

== Cast ==
- Mammootty as Dr. Daniel James, a Defence Research Wing officer
- Mohanlal as Colonel Rahim Naik, a retired Indian Army officer and Daniel's best friend
- Fahadh Faasil as Shakthi Sundaram, the owner of Shakthi Solutions and a former IAF officer cadet
- Kunchacko Boban as Michael "Mike" Devassy, a former IAF officer cadet and Shakthi's colleague
- Nayanthara as Adv. Lathika Padmanabhan, Daniel’s ex-wife
- Rajiv Menon as Defence Minister J. P. Sundaram, Shakthi's father
- Zarin Shihab as Ayisha Iqbal, Daniel's second wife
- Darshana Rajendran as Jyothi Kurian, Michael's lover
- Revathi as Nalini Ramakrishnan, the former Union Home Minister
- Prakash Belawadi as Sreedharan, Daniel's boss at DRW
- Indrans as ASI Satheeshan
- Grace Antony as Anju, Rahim's caretaker
- Jinu Joseph as Raghuram, Indian Consulate Officer, Faraha
- Shaheen Siddique as Vignesh "Vicky" Kumar, STF officer, Shakthi's aide
- Ishan Shoukath as Dibakar, Shakthi's aide
- Sanal Aman as Yousuf, Shakthi's aide
- Sarath Sabha as Senthil
- Sshivada as Uma, Michael’s wife
- Sreeparvathy as Athira
- Geethi Sangeetha as Athira's mother
- Sudhi Kozhikode as Athira's father
- Amala Rose Kurian as Jyothi's friend
- Vaishak Shankar as Advocate
- P. L. Thenappan as Police Officer
- Vineeth Thattil David as Radhakrishnan
- Samson Matthew Valiyaparambil as MD, Shakti Hospital
- Saanya Nair as Vignesh's girlfriend

== Production ==
Principal photography commenced in November 2024 in Sri Lanka. Filming took place across multiple locations in India and internationally, including Hyderabad, at Ramoji Film City, the United Kingdom, including London, Azerbaijan, the United Arab Emirates, New Delhi, Kashmir, Coimbatore, and Kochi. Filming concluded in January 2026.

== Music ==
Patriot

Soundtrack album by Sushin Shyam
- Genre: Feature film soundtrack
- Language: Malayalam
- Label: Sushhh! Records
- Producer: Sushin Shyam

Sushin Shyam chronology
Bougainvillea (2024)	Patriot (2026)	Balan: The Boy (2026)

Singles from Patriot
- 1. "Kaattu Thottappol" Released: 12 March 2026; 2. "Manushyan" Released: 25 April 2026; 3. "Innalekal" Released: 8 May 2026

The soundtrack is composed by Sushin Shyam.

The first single, "Kaattu Thottappol", written by Anwar Ali, was released prior to the film's release. The song is sung by iSai and Kapil Kapilan. A second single titled "Manushyan" was released on 26 April, sung by Shakthisree Gopalan.

Track listing
No.	Title	Lyrics	Singer(s)	Length
1.	"Kaattu Thottappol"	Anwar Ali	iSai, Kapil Kapilan	4:16
2.	"Manushyan"	Vinayak Sasikumar	Shakthisree Gopalan, Mammootty	3:37
3.	"Innalekal"	Vinayak Sasikumar	Job Kurian	2:10

== Release ==
=== Theatrical ===
Patriot was released worldwide on 1 May 2026.

=== Home media ===
The digital streaming rights were acquired by ZEE5. The film began streaming on the platform from 5 June 2026.

== Reception ==
Anandu Suresh of The Indian Express gave 3 out of 5 stars, writing "Kudos to Mahesh Narayanan for not being intimidated by Mammootty and Mohanlal's superstardom, and to the two legends for simply trusting the director's vision", even though "Mahesh's script ultimately falls flat, with mediocre writing throughout that fails to elevate Patriot". S.R. Praveen of The Hindu wrote "Despite its predictable narrative, Patriot is an engaging and even brave film on a pertinent issue. It is not often that a questioning “dissident” gets the central role in an Indian film these days".

Vishal Menon of The Hollywood Reporter India wrote "Patriot is a film that does a lot of things right with a lot to love in the writing, its subtle scores (Sushin Shyam is the composer) and the topics it explores. It is also a mini miracle that the film comes close to achieving the sky-high expectations ... It might be miles away from greatness, but it’s not often that we see a whistleblower thriller with so many unforgettable whistle-worthy moments". Janani K of India Today gave 3.5 out of 5 stars, writing "With intelligent writing and a grounded vision, it is spy cinema done right — minor shortcomings and all ... Patriot is not without its flaws. There are stretches that lose momentum before the film pulls you back in". Athulya Nambiar of Mid-Day wrote that "Patriot’s biggest USP is undoubtedly the reunion of Malayalam superstars Mohanlal and Mammootty. Despite a few flaws, the film runs high on the back of the reunion of the stars after nearly two decades".
