= Little Miss Rawther =

2023 Indian romantic drama film

- Theatrical release poster
- Directed by: Vishnu Dev
- Written by: Shersha Sherief
- Produced by: Srujan Yarabolu; Sadhik Sheikh
- Starring: Gouri G. Kishan; Shersha Sherief
- Cinematography: Luke Jose
- Edited by: Sangeeth Prathap
- Music by: Govind Vasantha
- Production company: S Originals
- Distributed by: Capital Cinemas
- Release date: 13 October 2023
- Running time: 126 minutes
- Country: India
- Language: Malayalam

Little Miss Rawther is a 2023 Indian Malayalam-language musical romantic drama film directed by Vishnu Dev (in his directorial debut) from a screenplay written by Shersha Sherief. The film follows the love relationship between Naina Rawther (Gouri G. Kishan), a short woman, and Abhijith Chandradas (Shersha Sherief), a tall man.

Principal photography began in October 2022. The shooting took place in and around Kochi and Thiruvananthapuram. The music and background score was composed by Govind Vasantha. Little Miss Rawther was released in theatres on 13 October 2023.

Sangeeth Prathap was awarded the Best Editor Award at the 54th Kerala State Film Awards announced on 16 August 2024.

== Premise ==
Naina Rawther is a modern-day successful young woman, born to an upper-middle class Muslim family. Her family was very orthodox, a patriarchal father and an over-dramatic mother. She was suffering from OCD problems. Meanwhile, Abhijit, her college boyfriend is seen going through a very tough phase in his life, owing to his sinking film career. Unable to bear the fact that Naina is getting married, he calls his college best friend Arun Kaliyikka for a company and gets completely drunk. This is when Naina who gets cold-feet about marrying Shafeek, calls Abhijit who is drunk, for some life perspective on the wedding eve. After the conversation that happened between them, Naina reconsider her decision to marry and decides to run away with Abhijit.

== Cast ==
- Gouri G. Kishan as Naina Rawther
- Shersha Sherief as Abhijith Chandradas
- Jishnu Sreekumar as Arun Kaliyikka, Abhijith's friend
- Nikita Teresa Mathew as Lachu, Arun's wife
- Sangeeth Prathap as Shine, Arun's cousin
- Nandini Gopalakrishnan as Shobhana, Abhijith's mother
- Ranjith Velayudhan as Chandradas, Abhijith's father
- Manoj K. U. as Sainudin, Naina's father
- Neeraja Rajendran as Naina's grandmother

== Production ==
The title of the film was officially announced on 7 October 2022. The first look poster was released on 12 October 2022. The film is co-produced by Srujan Yarabolu and Sadhik Sheikh under the banner of S Originals. Shersha Sherief, who acted in Nizhal (2021) and Hridayam (2022), made his debut as a lead actor and writer. The film also marks the directorial debut of Vishnu Dev.

=== Filming ===
The makers started the principal photography on 26 October 2022 with the switch-on ceremony and completed it on 2 March 2023. It took 37 days to complete the shoot in 3 different schedules. The major shooting was completed in Thiruvananthapuram and Kochi, Kerala. The post-production of the film started in April 2023.

== Music ==
The original background score and songs were composed by Govind Vasantha. The song "Chikki Chikki" was released on 12 May 2023, sung by Benny Dayal. The vocals for the second song "Ra Ra Rajasika" were given by Sithara. The music rights were obtained by Wonderwall Media Network.

Track listing
No.	Title	Lyrics	Singer(s)	Length
1.	"Tharame Tharame"	Titto P. Thankachen	Govind Vasantha	2:26
2.	"Pyaare Pyaare"	Titto P. Thankachen	Govind Vasantha	3:20
3.	"Chikki Chikki"	Titto P. Thankachen	Benny Dayal	1:47
4.	"Snehadweepile"	Anwar Ali	Pradeep Kumar; Chinmayi Sripaada	3:25
5.	"Ra Ra Rajasika"	Titto P. Thankachen	Sithara	2:50
Total length:				12:68

== Release ==
Little Miss Rawther was given a U/A certificate by the Central Board of Film Certification. The film was initially scheduled to release on 6 October 2023. There were reports that the film would release on 12 October 2023. The official trailer was unveiled by Dulquer Salmaan, Manju Warrier, and Vineeth Sreenivasan. Director Vishnu Dev and lead actress Gouri G. Kishan announced the release date of the film through their social media handles.

== Awards and nominations ==
Year	Award	Category	Recipient	Result	Ref.
2023	Kerala State Film Awards	Best Editor	Sangeeth Prathap	Won	
2024	SIIMA Awards	Best Male Debut (Malayalam)	Shersha Sherief	Nominated	

== Reception ==
=== Critical response ===
Sruthi Ganapathy Raman of Film Companion wrote, "Vishnu Dev's Little Miss Rawther has a sharp, distinctive way in which it sets up characters. The modern romance piece does explore the opposites attract quandary." Arunima Krishnan of Malayala Manorama praised the score and wrote, "With beautiful songs and accompanying visual charm, the film is sure to win campus minds."
