= Pani (film) =

2024 Indian film by Joju George

- Theatrical release poster
- Directed by: Joju George
- Written by: Joju George
- Produced by: Gokulam Gopalan; Joju George; Sijo Vadakkan
- Starring: Joju George; Sagar Surya; Abhinaya; Junaiz V. P.
- Cinematography: Venu ISC; Jinto George
- Edited by: Manu Antony
- Music by: Vishnu Vijay; Sam C. S Santhosh Narayanan
- Production companies: AD Studios; Sree Gokulam Movies; Appu Pathu Pappu
- Distributed by: Sree Gokulam Movies; Dream Big Films; Phars Film (overseas); Yash Raj Films (UK/Europe); Hombale Films (Karnataka)
- Release date: 24 October 2024
- Running time: 143 minutes
- Country: India
- Language: Malayalam
- Budget: est. ₹15 crore
- Box office: est. ₹36 crore

Pani (transl. The job, slang "Revenge") is a 2024 Indian Malayalam-language action thriller film written and directed by Joju George (in his directorial debut). It stars Joju, Sagar Surya, and Junaiz V. P., with Abhinaya, Seema, Prashanth Alexander, Sujith Shankar, Bobby Kurian, Renjith Velayudhan, Chandini Sreedharan, Bitto Davis, and Abhaya Hiranmayi in supporting roles. The film's music was composed by Vishnu Vijay, Sam C. S. and Santhosh Narayanan.

Principal photography commenced on 9 October 2023 in Thrissur, Kerala. Pani was released in theatres on 24 October 2024 and was a commercial success at box office. Two sequels are in development.

== Plot ==
Mangalath Giri, is a wealthy and influential businessman leading a happy and peaceful life with his beloved wife Gauri, his family and friends in Thrissur. Don and Siju are two antisocials youth who go about disrupting people' lives. The duo murders a businessman who was unwilling to sell his land to another businessman who was a rival of Giri and gang. After the murder they claim to the cops that they first witnessed the dead body inside the ATM. While waiting at a supermarket to collect payment for their contract kill where they spot Giri's wife, Gauri and misbehaves with her. Deeply insulted Gauri, notifies this to Giri who beats up the guys and dislocates Siju's arm. Fueled by revenge, the duo resolves to ruin Giri's life. They start by breaking into Giri's house and sexually assaulting Gauri by stripping her of her saree and blouse, while Giri is away on a business matter. Giri is distraught over this and vows revenge on the duo. Giri's mother visits them and consoles Gauri and Giri. She tells Giri not to carry this incident with him further and also tells him to have his complete revenge on the perverted guys. Using the CCTV visuals from the house, David Antony "Warrant Davi" , a notorious gangster, friend and business partner of Giri begins searching for the duo through his network in Thrissur. But the duo manages to stay one step ahead of them. The gang learns from associates in police that Don and Siju are behind the ATM murder. Davi manages to capture Don's father and his girlfriend as hostage and threatens Don over phone to surrender. Enraged, Don and Siju break into Davi's home at night and kill him and his right-hand man - Suni. Giri, Kuruvila, Saji and Jaya - Davi's wife are distraught at the loss of him. While Giri is driving away from Davi's home Don and Siju attack him. Giri manages to escape and chase them and crashes into their bike throwing them off from a bridge into the river. 3 months later, after finding no remains of the duo, everybody thinks they're dead. But Don and Siju who have survived, attack Giri's brother in law Kuruvila and leave him to die in the boot of his car. Don calls Giri from Kuruvila's phone and taunt him to save Kuruvila. Saji and Giri manage to save him and take him to the hospital. But while Giri is away, the duo again manage to sneak into the hospital dressed in burqah clothes and slashes the throat of Giri's mother inside the lift. Then they surrender to the police. Next day while producing them at court, Don and Siju are shot by a sniper and taken to the hospital. Giri's men create a commotion outside and crash an ambulance to distract the police stationed there and kidnap the duo. Giri takes them to a secluded location and beats and stabs them and hangs them on their hands. But they continue to taunt him how they managed to harm his dear ones despite his influence and power. Suddenly Siju's body explodes and smithers into pieces terrifying Don. He looks at Giri and screams in anger when his body also explodes. Finally having avenged his family and friend, Giri, Jaya and Saji drive away .

== Cast ==
- Joju George as Mangalath Giri, a powerful gangster based in Thrissur
- Abhinaya as Gowri, Giri's wife
- Sagar Surya as Don Sebastian
- Junaiz V. P. as Siju K. T.
- Seema as Mangalath Devaki Amma, Giri's and Karthika's mother, Gowri's and Kuruvila's mother in law
- Chandini Sreedharan as ACP Kalyani Prakash IPS, Giri's cousin
- Alexander Prasanth as Kuruvilla, Giri's best friend, brother in law and partner
- Sujith Shankar as Saji, Giri's cousin and partner
- Bobby Kurian as David Antony "Warrant Davi", a notorious gangster and Giri's partner
- Ranjith Velayudhan as Commissioner Ranjith Velayudhan IPS, Thrissur City Police
- Bitto Davis as Sulochanan, ATM murder witness
- Abhaya Hiranmayi as Jaya, Davi's wife
- Sona Maria Abraham as Karthika Kuruvila, Giri's sister and Kuruvila's wife
- Jayashankar Karimuttom as Sebastian, Don's father
- Lanka Lakshmi as Lakshmi, a maidservant
- Merlet Ann Thomas as Sneha, Don's girlfriend
- Anoop Krishnan as Joshi
- Jayaraj Warrier as himself
- Babu Namboothiri as Suresh's brother
- Rinosh George as Kalyani's fiancé
- Ramesh Girija as Karikk Suni aka Sunil Kumar
- Ashraf Mallisery as Aashan

== Production ==
=== Development ===
The film marks the directorial debut of Joju George. The film was officially announced in October 2023. On 16 December 2023, Joju George announced his collaboration with several newcomers for this project. M Riaz Adam and Sijo Vadakkan jointly produced the movie. Venu ISC joined the team to handle cinematography, while editor was Manu Antony.

=== Casting ===
Joju George was signed to direct and play a lead role in this film. Some of the major cast members were selected from Bigg Boss Malayalam Season 5, such as Junaiz V. P. and Sagar Surya.

Abhinaya plays the female lead in this movie. The cast also includes Abhaya Hiranmayi, Seema, Chandini Sreedharan, Prashanth Alexander, Sujith Shankar in prominent roles.

=== Filming ===
Principal photography began on 9 October 2023, with a puja ceremony. It took more than 100 days to complete the shoot, wrapping up on 27 February 2024. Shooting took place in and around Thrissur, Kerala.

== Music ==
The music was composed by Vishnu Vijay, Sam C. S. and Santhosh Narayanan. The lyrics for all the songs in the film were penned by Muhsin Parari. The soundtrack consists of four tracks.

Track listing

No.	Title	Lyrics	Singer	Length
1	"Nayadikal Irakal	Santhosh Narayanan	Santhosh Narayanan	
2	"Pani Motion Poster - Theme 1"	Vishnu Vijay	Vishnu Vijay	
3	"Family Song"	Muhsin Parari	Shakthisree Gopalan	2:10
4	"Dhoorekku Dhoorekku"	Muhsin Parari	Shakthisree Gopalan	3:56
5	"Love Theme"	Vishnu Vijay	Vishnu Vijay	3:01

== Release ==
Pani was released in theatres on 24 October 2024.

=== Critical reception ===
Swathi P. Ajith of Onmanorama wrote that "the movie is undoubtedly a mass entertainer that seeks to tap into your emotions, skillfully triggerring various feelings throughout". Sanjith Sidhardhan of OTT Play rated 3.5 out of 5 stars, stating that "Joju George aces the directorial test with Pani, which turns into a thrilling ride once it gets going. Backed by solid performances and good writing, Joju makes a confident debut as a director". Anna Mathews of The Times of India rated 3 out of 5 stars and said: "With violence being the new hero of massy entertainers, Joju is probably giving audiences what they want and he succeeds fairly well in this". S. R. Praveen of The Hindu stated that "Joju George's gory drama works despite its typical revenge plot" as "[Joju] has quite a hold on the progression of events which keeps coming at almost the right pace and timing".

Rating 3 in a scale of 5, Vignesh Madhu of The New Indian Express wrote that "Despite some generic writing and blips in crafting a thrilling latter half, Joju makes an assured debut with Pani [...] Sagar Surya and Junaiz V. P. are exceptional as the antagonists, elevating the film's otherwise generic writing". Anandu Suresh of The Indian Express gave 2.5 out of 5 stars and said: "While the first act is solid, suggesting that Joju George is on track to deliver an outstanding actioner, the script falters very soon and begins bombarding viewers with stale moments, incidents and dialogues". Latha Srinivasan of Hindustan Times wrote that "Joju George has made a good directorial debut, and Pani presents it well on screen, even though the story is not new for the audience".

=== Box office ===
The film grossed ₹36.4 crore worldwide, of which ₹13.4 crore were from outside India.

== Sequels ==
In April 2025, Joju George announced that the script for the sequel has been completed, and will begin filming later in the year. He also revealed plans for a third instalment confirming that the Pani franchise will continue as a trilogy.

The second instalment of the trilogy is titled Deluxe. Unlike its predecessor, Deluxe will feature a new cast with different storyline. Joju George will play role of Deluxe Benny. Filming will begin by December 2025.
