= Pathrosinte Padappukal =

2022 comedy-drama film

- Theatrical release poster
- Directed by: Afsal Abdul Latheef
- Written by: Dinoy Paulose
- Produced by: Marikar Entertainments
- Starring: Dinoy Paulose; Sharaf U Dheen; Naslen; Grace Antony
- Cinematography: Jayesh Mohan
- Edited by: Sangeeth Prathap
- Music by: Jakes Bejoy
- Release date: 18 March 2022
- Country: India
- Language: Malayalam

Pathrosinte Padappukal is a 2022 Indian Malayalam-language comedy-drama film directed by Afsal Abdul Latheef. The screenplay of the film is written by Dinoy Paulose. The film features Sharaf U Dheen, Grace Antony, Naslen, Dinoy Paulose and Ranjita Menon. The film is set in Vypin.

== Plot ==
Pathrose who works in a gas agency, has a family consisting of his wife and four children. Tony, who is the second among them is the central character. He is a lazy lad who doesn't do any works and enjoys his life. The eldest son Sony is a traveler and the youngest son Bonnie is a thief. They have one sister named Neenu who is a student. The arrival of Tony's grandmother and the following interesting incidents that revolve around their lives forms the plot of the story. Tony who falls in love with his neighbor girl and best friend Ammu and the intriguing events that occurs as the result adds further twists to the story.

== Cast ==
- Dinoy Paulose as Tony Pathrose
- Sharaf U Dheen as Sony Pathrose
- Naslen as Boney Pathrose
- Grace Antony as Christeena
- Ranjitha Menon as Ammu
- Nandu as Priest
- James Eliya as Pathrose
- Shiny Sarah as Jolly
- Suresh Krishna as Satya
- Johny Antony as Kuriakose
- George Wincent as David
- Rahul Reghu
- Shyam Mohan as Arun
- Sangeeth Prathap as Tattoo artist

== Reception ==
The film was described as "'a cute little family film filled with romance, humour, emotions, and friends" Other reviews were more mixed: while LensMen Reviews wrote that it "starts off giving us a feeling that it has the potential to be the next Thanneer Mathan Dhinangal." but "plunged into mediocrity, and it never recovered", OTTPlay found it was "a dull madcap comedy in which some jokes land and most don't"
