= Ayalvaashi =

- Theatrical release poster
- Directed by: Irshad Parari
- Written by: Irshad Parari
- Produced by: Ashiq Usman; Muhsin Parari
- Starring: Soubin Shahir; Binu Pappu; Nikhila Vimal; Lijomol Jose; Naslen
- Cinematography: Sajith Purushan
- Edited by: Siddique Hyder
- Music by: Jakes Bejoy
- Production companies: Ashiq Usman Productions; Local Agenda Motion Pictures
- Release date: 21 April 2023
- Country: India
- Language: Malayalam

Ayalvaashi is a 2023 Indian Malayalam-language comedy drama film directed by Irshad Parari. The film was written by Irshad Parari, and it was produced by Ashiq Usman and Muhsin Parari under the banner of Ashiq Usman Productions and Local Agenda Motion Pictures It stars Soubin Shahir, Binu Pappu, Naslen, Nikhila Vimal and Lijomol Jose in lead roles. The film was released worldwide on 21 April 2023.

== Cast ==
- Soubin Shahir as Thaju
- Binu Pappu as Benny
- Naslen as Pachu
- Nikhila Vimal as Celine, Benny's wife
- Lijomol Jose as Kuttimalu, Thaju's wife
- Akhila Bhargavan as Smrithi
- Parvathy Babu as Kunji
- Gokulan as Ajippan
- Ajmal Khan as Salman
- Kottayam Nazeer as Baby
- Jagadish as Bernard, Benny's father-in-law and Celine's father
- Vijayaraghavan as Barkath
- Swathi Das Prabhu as Labeeb, Barkath's son

== Production ==
The title look of the poster was released 5 November 2022 and the first look of the film was released on 23 January 2023. Later the trailer was released. Back in 2019, Prithviraj and Indrajith were originally cast as Thaju and Benny.

== Reception ==
Anna M. M. Vetticad of Firstpost stated that "Barring the Chewing Gum song and Soubin, there's nothing here." A critic from Onmanorama stated that "However, the movie still manages to be enjoyable, with a homely vibe throughout its runtime." S. R. Praveen of The Hindu wrote "Soubin Shahir and Nikhila Vimal's comedy-drama is marred by a thin plot and listless execution." Cris of The News Minute gave 2 out 5 stars and gave mixed reviews.
