= Suresh Kumar =

Suresh Kumar may refer to:

- Suresh Kumar (government official), U.S. government official
- Suresh Kumar (mountaineer), Indian mountaineer
- S. Suresh Kumar (born 1955), Indian politician in Karnataka
- Suresh Kumar (Himachal politician)
- Suresh Rana or Suresh Kumar, Indian politician in Uttar Pradesh
- Selvam Suresh Kumar, Indian cricketer
- G. Suresh Kumar, Indian film producer
