= Varavu =

- Theaterical release poster
- Directed by: Shaji Kailas
- Written by: A. K. Sajan
- Produced by: Naisy Reji
- Starring: Joju George; Arjun Ashokan; Saniya Iyappan; Murali Gopy; Baiju Santhosh; Vani Viswanath; Bobby Kurian
- Cinematography: S. Saravanan
- Edited by: Shameer Muhammed
- Music by: Sam C. S.
- Production company: Olga Productions
- Release date: 16 July 2026
- Running time: 143 minutes
- Country: India
- Language: Malayalam
- Budget: ₹10 crore
- Box office: ₹15 crore

Varavu is a 2026 Indian Malayalam-language action thriller film directed by Shaji Kailas and produced by Naisy Reji. It stars Joju George, Arjun Ashokan, Murali Gopy, Baiju Santhosh, Vani Viswanath and Bobby Kurian.

== Plot ==
The story follows a family that falls victim to the powerful elite in a small town. Time passes, wounds fester. One man's return forces a confrontation that will expose decades of lies and corruption.

== Cast ==
- Joju George as Kaattungal Paulson
  - Achu as Young Paulson
- Arjun Ashokan as Kaattungal Williams/Willy
  - Abhinandu Umesh as Young Williams
- Murali Gopy as Medayil Kochettan
- Saniya Iyappan as Medayil Lisha
- Deepak Parambol as Seban
  - Adithyan Surendran as Young Seban
- Abhimanyu Shammy Thilakan as Medayil Yohan
- Baiju Santhosh as Paappan
- Baburaj as SI Zakariya/Kalan Kariy
- Vani Viswanath as SP Anupama Shankar IPS
- Bobby Kurian as Inspector Iqbal Muhammad
- Sukanya as Sister Kattungal Daisy
  - Amrithavarshini as Young Daisy
- Vincy Aloshious as Sister Sophy
- Azees Nedumangad as Sethu
  - Nandhu Sooranad as Young Sethu
- Veena Nair as Vasanthi
- Kottayam Ramesh as Appachan
- Biju Pappan as Roychan
- Shaji Dubai as Secretary Jomy
- Andrei Bliznetsov as Father Leo
- Chali Pala as Father Jose
- Sreejith Ravi as Paily
- Ashwin Kkumar as Kopra Martin
- Qatar Mohanan as Home Secretary Abraham Paul IAS
- Metalda as Aphonya
- Mithumol as Minnu
- Ashika Ashokan as Medayil Sheela

== Production ==
The film is produced by Olga Productions.

=== Filming ===
Principal photography began on February 2026 at Munnar.

== Release ==
The film was released on 16 July 2026. It was earlier scheduled to release on 1 May 2026 before being postponed to 12 June 2026, but again was postponed and finally released on 16 July 2026.

Home Media

The film’s digital rights have been acquired by ZEE5.It premiered on 15 september2026.

== Reception ==
The film collected an estimated Rs 51 lakh gross in India on its opening day.

Yashaswini Sri of Indian Express writes "Varavu is not a reinvention. It is Shaji Kailas doing what Shaji Kailas does, with a lead actor who brings enough weight and nuance to elevate the material beyond its template. If you walk in wanting a grounded, well-acted mass thriller with strong action and a slow-burn revenge arc, it fumbles here and there but delivers".

Princy Alexander of Onmanorama says that the film's biggest strength is Murali Gopy who commands every scene with quiet menace, delivering sharp dialogues with conviction. She credits him for a measured performance adding that Joju George delivered another committed performance, balancing vulnerability with authority. She concludes that Varavu managed to stay firmly within the cinematic template, seldom attempting to reinvent that formula or surprise its audience, but it delivers some action and a few emotional highs to keep fans engaged.

S.R. Praveen of The Hindu says that Varavu is the kind of film that gives one the feeling that the action sequences were probably planned out first, with an excuse of a storyline added later. He adds that the film has one element of mystery, related to the disappearance of a character, which could have been used effectively to create some interest in the narrative.

Vivek Santhosh of Cinema Express writes that the lead actor Joju George throws plenty of punches throughout, but this formulaic affair remains trapped in an old style of storytelling. He adds that Varavu tries to work as a mystery-tinged, action-packed revenge drama, moving between family tragedy and one fight after another.

Sreeju Sudhakaran of Rediff says that n Varavu, one can see Kailas trying to modernise his visual style, but the effort doesn't always succeed. "His trademark flourishes, rapid zoom-ins and zoom-outs, criss-cross editing and stylised slow motion, are all present, but they now feel dated," he adds.

Vishal Menon of The Hollywood Reporter India gave the film a negative review, describing it as a "gratingly old-school action drama" with a clueless lead performance by Joju George, criticising its over-reliance on dated commercial tropes and jarring, unintentional humour during the action sequences.

== Box office ==
As of 21 July 2026, Varavu had collected approximately ₹4.39 crore in India across 5,818 shows, with around 210,000 tickets sold at an average occupancy of 14.5%. Daily collections peaked on 16 July 2026, with an average ticket price of ₹209.
