= Suresh Kumar (mountaineer) =

Indian mountaineer

- Born: 1 April 1970 (age 56); Pattoli Market, Muthukulam, Alappuzha District, Kerala, India
- Military career
- Allegiance: India
- Branch: Indo-Tibetan Border Police, Special Protection Group
- Rank: Havildar

Suresh Kumar was an Indian mountaineer. He was a member of two Indian Expeditions that conquered Mount Everest in 1992 and 1996. He is a native of Pattoli market Muthukulam, in Alappuzha district of Kerala State, India

== Early life and career ==
He joined the Indo-Tibetan Border Police as a photographer in 1987 prior to which he working as a photographer at studios in Alappuzha. In 1997, he moved from Indo-Tibetan Border Police to the Special Protection Group (SPG), a special armed security force formed for the protection of Prime Minister of India and former Prime Ministers and their immediate family. He retired from Special Protection Group in 2008 after serving in the security forces of Prime Minister VP Singh, Chandra Shekhar, I. K. Gujral, Atal Bihari Vajpayee and Manmohan Singh. He worked as a Home Guard in Alappuzha city. In 1997, the Kerala government declared a cash award of ₹5 lakh, but he received only ₹1 lakh.

== 1991 Indo-Japan Kanchenjunga Expedition ==
Suresh Kumar was member in the expedition as the film team in the first Indo-Japanese Kanchenjunga expedition conducted by Indo-Tibetan Border Police to the world's third highest peak, Kanchenjunga led by Major Hukam Singh in 1991.

== 1992 Indo-Tibetan Border Police Expedition to Mount Everest ==
The 1992 Indo-Tibetan Border Police Expedition to Mount Everest by Indo-Tibetan Border Police, led by Additional Deputy Supernatant Major Hukam Singh on 1992 recorded a total of eight ascents by Indians including Ms.Santosh Yadav. The second woman summiteer from India. Suresh Kumar was member in the expedition as the film team. Indo-Tibetan Border Police, of which senior medical officer Chittaranjan R. Pattanayak was the deputy leader. A total of eight ascents by Indians.

== 1996 Indo-Tibetan Border Police expedition to Mount Everest ==
The second 1996 Indo-Tibetan Border Police expedition to Mount Everest led by Mohinder Singh -North Col-North East Ridge by the Indo-Tibetan Border Police to reach the summit of Mount Everest happened in the background of the 1996 Mount Everest disaster, and resulted in three summiteers of the expedition dying. The expedition credited as being the first Indian ascent of Everest from the North Side and a total eight persons reach the summit. Indo-Tibetan Border Police, personnel Parash Mani Das and Harbhajan Singh were the deputy leaders. Suresh Kumar was a climbing member of this expedition but did not do the summit bid.
