= It's a Medical Miracle =

Malayalam Film

- Theatrical Release Poster
- Directed by: Shyamin Gireesh
- Written by: Nileen Sandra
- Produced by: Dr. Paul Varghese; Sujith J. Nair
- Starring: Sangeeth Prathap; Sharaf U Dheen; Akhila Bhargavan
- Cinematography: Akhil Xavier
- Edited by: Rakesh Cherumadam
- Music by: Mujeeb Majeed
- Production companies: Dr. Paul’s Entertainment; Dream Big Films
- Release date: 18 September 2026
- Country: India
- Language: Malayalam

It's a Medical Miracle (or simply Medical Miracle) is an 2026 Indian Malayalam language supernatural comedy film directed by Shyamin Gireesh and written by Nileen Sandra. The film features Sangeeth Prathap, Sharaf U Dheen and Akhila Bhargavan in lead roles.

== Plot ==
Ruben, a young man, meets with an accident and falls into a coma. Although doctors declare him brain-dead, he unexpectedly regains consciousness with an unusual ability to hear sounds and conversations from exceptionally long distances. Following his recovery, Ruben becomes intrigued by the voice of a nurse whom he believes played a role in his survival and sets out to find her. During his search, he becomes entangled in a series of mysterious events involving concealed identities, undisclosed past connections and revenge. As he investigates these circumstances, Ruben's extraordinary hearing ability becomes instrumental in uncovering hidden information and revealing the truth behind the events surrounding him.

== Cast ==
- Sangeeth Prathap as Ruben
- Sharaf U Dheen as Sooraj
- Akhila Bhargavan as Susanna
- Nileen Sandra as Ancy

== Music ==
The songs and background score was composed by Mujeeb Majeed.

Track listing
No.	Title	Lyrics	Singer(s)	Length
1.	"Kaathangal Dhoore"	Shabareesh Varma	Sanjith Hegde	03:24
2.	"Praakk"	Shyam Muraleedharan & Nileen Sandra	Bindhu Pankaj & Neeraj Remesh	03:13
3.	"Koode Parunna Kilikal"	Heykarthii	Ayraan	04:31
4.	"Nizhal Thodum"	Shyam Muraleedharan	Mujeeb Majeed	03:04
5.	"Arivaal"	Traditional	Dhwani Vipinlal	03:18
Total length:				17:30

== Release ==
=== Theatrical ===
It's a Medical Miracle was released in theaters in India on September 18, 2026. The film was released in Malayalam across theaters in Kerala and other select Indian states.

The film’s digital streaming rights were acquired by ManoramaMAX, where it premiered on October 15, 2026..

== Reception ==
Anandu Suresh of The Indian Express rated 3 out of 5 stars and praised It's a Medical Miracle for its ambitious premise, engaging treatment, technical execution and performances, particularly those of Sangeeth Prathap and Sharaf U Dheen, while criticising its repetitive latter portions, underdeveloped supporting characters and rushed climax.

Navamy Sudhish of The Hindu praised It's a Medical Miracle for its slick technical execution, unusual premise and performances, particularly those of Sangeeth Prathap and Sharaf U Dheen, but criticised its loose screenplay and declining narrative momentum in the latter half.
