= Akhila Bhargavan =

Indian actress

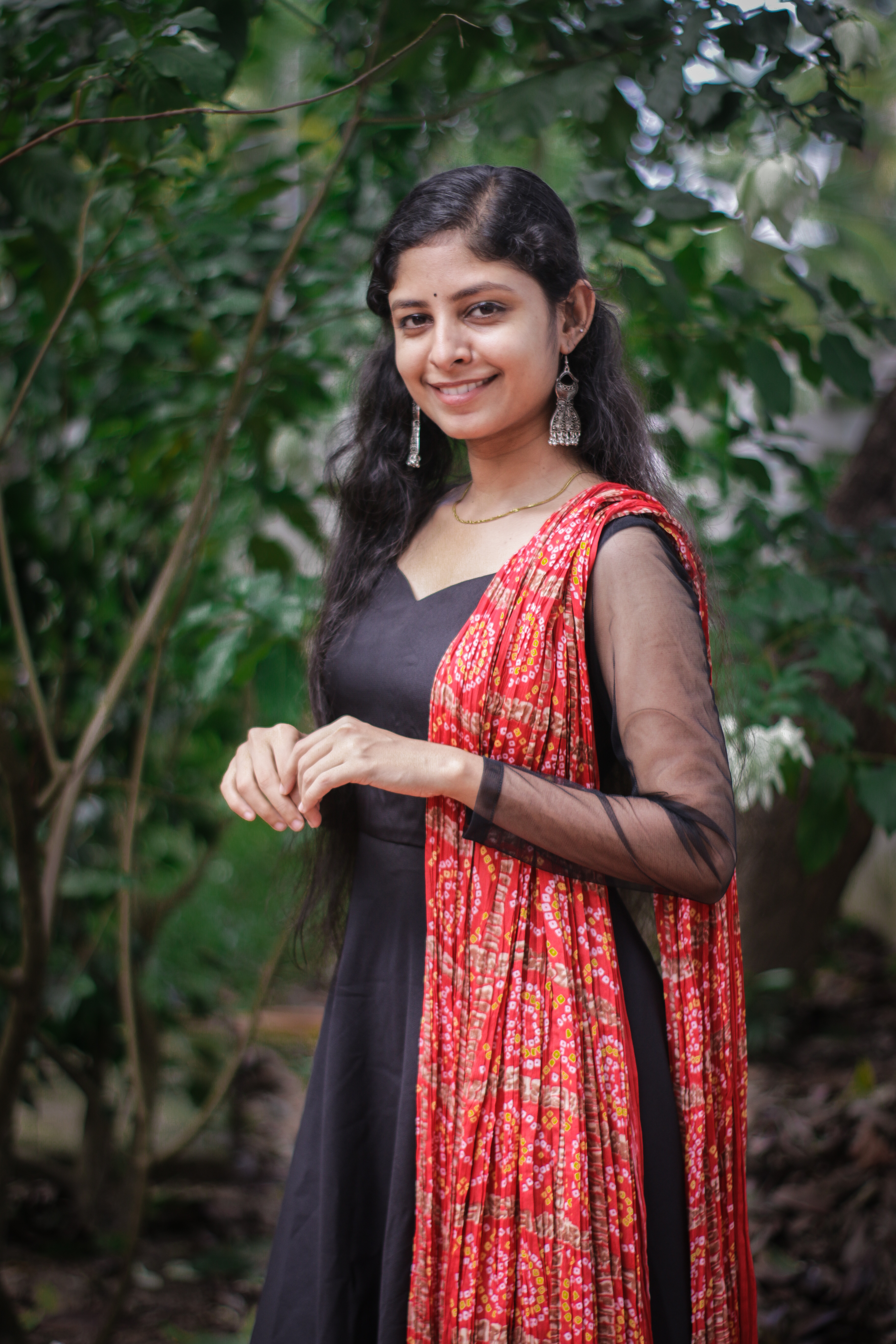
- Akhila Bhargavan in 2024
- Born: Akhila; 17 October 1997 (age 28); Payyanur, Kerala, India
- Education: CMS College of Arts and Science, Coimbatore
- Occupation: Actress
- Years active: 2022–present
- Known for: Premalu; Sookshmadarshini; Ayalvaashi; Poovan
- Spouse: Rahul P.P (m. 2021)

Akhila Bhargavan is an Indian actress working primarily in Malayalam films. She made her debut in her acting career through the short film Anurag Engineering Works and she made her debut in the Malayalam movie Poovan (2023). Her movie Premalu (2024) emerged as one of the highest grossing Malayalam movies of all time gaining her attention in Malayalam film industry.

== Early life and education ==
Akhila Bharagavan hails from Payyanur, Kannur. She did her schooling at St Mary's Girls High School Payyannur. She completed her Post graduation in Microbiology from CMS college, Coimbatore in 2020.

== Filmography ==
=== Films ===
Key
†	Denotes films that have not yet been released

- All films are in Malayalam unless noted otherwise.

Year	Title	Role	Notes	Ref.
2023	Poovan	Veena	Debut film	
2023	Ayalvaashi	Smrithi		
2024	Premalu	Karthika		
2024	Sookshmadarshini	Sulu		
2026	It's a Medical Miracle	Susanna		
2026	Avaraachan & Sons	Keerthi		

=== Web series ===
Year	Title	Role	Platform	Ref.
2026	Muthassi	Leela	ZEE5	

=== Short film ===
Year	Title	Role	Notes	Ref.
2022	Anurag Engineering Works	Neethu		
2024	The Spiral	Aunty		

== Accolades ==
Year	Award	Category	Film	Result	Ref
2025	13th South Indian International Movie Awards	SIIMA Award for Best Supporting Actress – Malayalam	Premalu	Won	
