= Sheshippu =

2026 Indian Malayalam-language psychological drama film

- Promotional release poster
- Directed by: Sreejith S. Kumar; Gritto Vincent
- Written by: Sreejith S. Kumar; Gritto Vincent
- Screenplay by: Sreejith S. Kumar; Gritto Vincent
- Story by: Sreejith S. Kumar; Gritto Vincent
- Produced by: Sajid Yahiya; Nithin Radhakrishnan
- Starring: Meenakshi Jayan; Rashid Rahman; Rajan Pootharakkal
- Cinematography: Denil Seby
- Edited by: Dani Davis
- Music by: Nixon Joy
- Production company: Cinema Pranthan Film Productions
- Distributed by: Sun NXT
- Release date: 23 January 2026
- Running time: 85 minutes
- Country: India
- Language: Malayalam

Sheshippu (transl. The Remnant) is a 2026 Indian Malayalam-language psychological drama film written and directed by debutants Sreejith S. Kumar and Gritto Vincent. The film is produced by Sajid Yahiya and Nithin Radhakrishnan under the banner of Cinema Pranthan Film Productions, the makers of Pallotty 90's Kids. It stars Meenakshi Jayan and Rashid Rahman in the lead roles.

== Plot ==
The film follows Pavi, a lonely ghostwriter residing in a remote hilly estate. His quiet existence is upended when he encounters Anju, a woman who has endured a harrowing ordeal and is visibly traumatized. As the two broken individuals navigate the aftermath of her trauma together, they forge an unexpected bond that explores themes of resilience, loneliness, and the suppressed emotions of human connection.

== Cast ==
- Meenakshi Jayan as Anju
- Rashid Rahman
- Rajan Pootharakkal as Pavi
- Albert Kottakkal
- Skariah Babu

== Production ==
The film marks the directorial debut of Sreejith S. Kumar and Gritto Vincent, who previously collaborated on various short films and documentaries. The project was filmed over a 12-day schedule in a single location to maintain its atmospheric and isolated tone. It was officially selected for the "Malayalam Cinema Today" category at the 30th International Film Festival of Kerala (IFFK 2025).

== Release ==
=== Theatrical ===
The film bypassed a traditional theatrical release after its festival run at IFFK 2025.

=== Home Media ===
The digital streaming rights were acquired by Sun NXT. The film premiered on the platform on 23 January 2026, featuring English subtitles for a global audience.

== Reception ==
The Hans India noted that while the premise had potential, the narrative "struggles with a sluggish pace that makes its 85-minute runtime feel longer."
