= Bobby Kurian =

Indian actor (born 1978)

- Born: Bobby Kurian; Kattappana, Idukki, India
- Occupations: Producer and actor
- Years active: 2010–present
- Spouse: Smitha Bobby
- Children: Hannah Sara Kurian, Harron Bobby Kurian
- Parents: P K Kurian.; Saramma Kurian

Bobby Kurian is an Indian actor who has appeared in many Malayalam films. He entered the film industry through Christian Brothers (film) (2011), working in line production and appearing in a brief acting role. He later acted in a brief role in London Bridge (film) (2014). In 2018, he was involved in Drama as a producer, line producer, and actor.

== Career ==
He entered the film industry through Christian Brothers, working in line production. In 2011, he appeared as an actor in a brief role in London Bridge. In 2014, he worked in drama projects. By 2018, he had taken on roles as a producer, line producer, and actor.

== Filmography ==
Year	Title	Role	Notes
2014	London Bridge	Debut	
2018	Drama		
2024	Pani	Warrant Davi	
2025	Sumathi Valavu	SI Benjamin	
2025	Agosham	Kings Benny	
2026	Magic Mushrooms	Divakaran	
2026	Varavu		
2026	Thudakkam		
2026	Law and Order †	TBA	
