= Hridayapoorvam =

2025 Indian film by Sathyan Anthikad

- Theatrical release poster
- Directed by: Sathyan Anthikad
- Screenplay by: Sonu T. P.
- Story by: Akhil Sathyan
- Produced by: Antony Perumbavoor
- Starring: Mohanlal; Malavika Mohanan; Sangeeth Prathap; Sangita Madhavan Nair
- Cinematography: Anu Moothedath
- Edited by: K. Rajagopal
- Music by: Justin Prabhakaran
- Production company: Aashirvad Cinemas
- Distributed by: Aashirvad Cinemas
- Release date: 28 August 2025
- Running time: 151 minutes
- Country: India
- Language: Malayalam
- Box office: ₹75.6−76.1 crore

Hridayapoorvam (transl. Wholeheartedly) is a 2025 Indian Malayalam-language romantic comedy-drama film directed by Sathyan Anthikad from a screenplay by Sonu T. P., based on a story by Akhil Sathyan. Produced by Antony Perumbavoor for Aashirvad Cinemas, the film stars Mohanlal, Malavika Mohanan, Sangita Madhavan Nair, and Sangeeth Prathap, along with Siddique, Lalu Alex, Janardhanan, Baburaj, Nishan, and Sabitha Anand in other substantial roles.

The development of a film reuniting Mohanlal and Anthikad was first disclosed by the latter in January 2024. The project, along with its official title, was formally announced that July. Principal photography commenced in February 2025 and concluded in May, taking place in Pune and Kochi. The film has music composed by Justin Prabhakaran and editing by K. Rajagopal.

Hridayapoorvam was released in theatres worldwide on 28 August 2025 and opened to mixed reviews from critics. Critics praised the film's warm, feel-good tone, family-oriented simplicity, moments of humour, and performances—particularly Mohanlal's screen presence and the emotional core of the narrative. While criticism focused on weaknesses in the screenplay such as uneven pacing, underdeveloped characters, lack of narrative cohesion, and reported inaccuracies in the depiction of medical procedures. However, the film became one of the highest-grossing Malayalam films of 2025.

== Plot ==
Sandeep Balakrishnan, a wealthy and irritable hotelier who runs a successful cloud-kitchen chain in Kochi, lives in isolation despite his wealth and affluence. After undergoing a heart transplant, he quickly returns to his work, dismissing the emotional weight of his surgery. He frequently remarks that "a heart is only an organ," irritating those around him who expect gratitude and compassion.

Weeks later, Sandeep travels to Pune along with his nurse Jerry to attend the engagement ceremony of Haritha, the daughter of Colonel Ravindranath, the army officer whose heart saved his life after his brain death due to a car accident. At the event, Sandeep meets Haritha, her mother Devika and several family friends. His blunt attitude, including his insistence that the transplant creates no sentimental bond, unsettles the family. During the ceremony, Haritha's engagement abruptly collapses when she learns that her groom Kiran installed spyware in her phone without her knowing, leading to an argument. Sandeep sustains a back injury and Jerry gets trashed up during a quarrel with Kiran's friends and is hospitalized. Unable to return to Kochi, he remains in Pune under the care of the Colonel's family. Jerry accompanies him, often creating comic situations with his carefree manner.

Sandeep initially treats the arrangement with irritation, avoiding interaction with the household. Over time, however, the kindness of Haritha and Devika begins to soften him. He shares meals with them, listens to stories of Colonel Ravindranath, and witnesses the strength with which they face life's difficulties. Haritha, still shaken by her broken engagement, gradually finds confidence again through Sandeep's unexpected support. Devika, who treats Sandeep like a member of the family, helps him reconcile with the emotions he has long denied. Through the course of his time with Haritha, Sandeep begins to develop a fleeting romantic connection with her. But, he then realises that Haritha sees her father in him and that he was wrong to desire any other kind of relationship with her. Therefore, when Jerry urges him to confess his emotions to Haritha, he refuses, and puts an end to the topic. In the meanwhile, Devika, begins to believe that Sandeep is falling for her. Blindsided by this assumption, Sandeep stays silent, but, as their time together draws to a close, Sandeep clarifies with Devika, that all he feels for her is affection and gratitude. Jerry's antics, along with visits from relatives such as Haritha's jovial uncle Jacob and Sandeep's brother-in-law Omanakuttan Panicker, provide lighthearted interludes that contrast with Sandeep's quiet transformation. Through these days, Sandeep begins to recognize that his new heart carries more than life—it carries the Colonel's love, memories, and bond with his family.

As he integrates into the household, Sandeep changes from a detached survivor into a man who embraces connection. He helps Haritha regain her confidence, encouraging her to pursue her career dreams rather than dwell on her failed marriage proposal. In a climactic sequence, he openly admits to Devika that he had been afraid of closeness all his life, and that the heart transplant not only saved his body but also gave him a family he never thought possible. Also he asks Jerry to be with him and asks him to join his business as a manager. The film concludes with Haritha preparing for a new beginning—leaving behind her past and stepping forward with hope. Devika, smiling through tears, accepts Sandeep as part of her family. In the final scene, Sandeep returns to manage his hotel with Jerry, but has an unexpected encounter with a woman who he thinks is his destined true love, leaving a sense of hope and happiness.

== Cast ==
- Mohanlal as Sandeep Balakrishnan, a heart transplant recipient who runs a cloud kitchen
- Malavika Mohanan as Haritha Ravindranath
- Sangita Madhavan Nair as Devika Nambhiar, Haritha's mother (voice-over by Bhagyalakshmi)
- Sangeeth Prathap as Jerry, Sandeep's nurse and friend
- Siddique as Omanakuttan "O. K." Panicker, Sandeep's brother-in-law
- Lalu Alex as "Pune" Jacob, Haritha's family friend
- Janardhanan as Sandeep's uncle and astrologer
- Baburaj as Captain Manoj Nambiar, Devika's brother
- Nishan as Kiran, Haritha's ex-fiancé
- Sabitha Anand as Geetha, Sandeep's elder sister and Panicker's wife
- Saumya Bhagyan Pillai as "Olichodiya" Rajani Mohan, Sandeep's ex-Fiancée
- Tiss Thomas as Bibin Babu, cloud kitchen's Lead Boy
- Arun Pradeep as Filmmaker boy 1
- Amal Thaha as Filmmaker boy 2
- Devaraj T R as Filmmaker boy 3
- Vikas Hande as Military Doctor

Cameo appearances

- Basil Joseph as Dr. Manu Rameshan
- Meera Jasmine as Anonymous woman in Sandeep's Cloud Kitchen
- Ragini Dwivedi as Dancer in the Song "Tuk Tuk Tuk Tu"
- Althaf Salim as Film Actor
- Antony Perumbavoor as Film Producer
- Anoop Sathyan as Bus Passenger and Wedding Guest
- Aniyappan as Film Actor

== Production ==
=== Development ===
The success of Neru proves that people love to see Mohanlal playing the common man. Similar to our other films, this will also be a relatable tale, but with a new treatment.

— Sathyan Anthikad, in a conversation with Suno FM

In early January 2024, during an interview with Suno FM, Sathyan Anthikad disclosed that he had initiated work on his upcoming film, which would mark his reunion with Mohanlal since their previous release Ennum Eppozhum (2015). The project, to be produced by Antony Perumbavoor under Aashirvad Cinemas, would be centred on the life of a common man. Anthikad added that the scripting process was still in its early stages and estimated that it would take approximately four to five months for the project to come to fruition. The film was officially announced under the title Hridayapoorvam on 9 July of that year. Mohanlal himself titled the film after hearing a brief outline of the story, and the title design features his own handwriting.

Debutant Sonu T. P. wrote the screenplay and dialogues, reportedly based on a story by the director. However, at the 25th-anniversary celebration of Aashirvad Cinemas held in Kochi in late January 2025, Anthikad revealed that the story was written by his son, Akhil Sathyan, while his twin brother, Anoop Sathyan, would be serving as the associate director. Justin Prabhakaran was confirmed as the music composer. Anu Moothedath was hired as the cinematographer, and K. Rajagopal as the editor.

The project germinated when filmmaker Althaf Salim sent a photograph to Akhil, inspiring the story that would later form the film's foundation. Akhil shared the idea with Anthikad, who found it distinctive and "deeply emotional". Together with Anoop, the three developed the idea into a plot. When Akhil became occupied with Sarvam Maya and Anoop undertook another project, Anthikad invited Sonu, whose short film Night Call (2022) had impressed him, to collaborate on developing the screenplay. In November 2024, the latter half of the script was revised. Akhil disclosed that the film is set in Pune and has "a uniquely emotional storyline that has its focus on humour," adding that Mohanlal's role would be "unlike anything he has done before. Anthikad made revisions to Sonu's screenplay, which was subsequently sent to Anoop for preparing the final draft.

=== Casting ===
Mohanlal portrays the character Sandeep Balakrishnan, as announced during the film's pooja ceremony in February 2025. He will sport a trimmed beard look for the film. On 3 October 2024, Aishwarya Lekshmi and Sangita Madhavan Nair were officially announced as the lead actresses, by Anthikad. Sangeeth Prathap announced his inclusion in November. He plays Jerry, in a full-length role alongside Mohanlal. Sangeeth was cast after Anthikad was impressed by his performance in Premalu.

In January 2025, it was reported that S. P. Charan was part of the cast, marking his debut in Malayalam cinema. By the end of that month, during the 25th anniversary celebration of Aashirvad Cinemas, Anthikad stated that Malavika Mohanan had replaced Lekshmi as the lead actress. Lekshmi opted out due to a scheduling conflict with a Telugu film. Regarding Malavika's casting, Anthikad noted that, as the film was shot in sync sound, he sought an actress capable of effortlessly speaking Malayalam, Hindi, Marathi, and English, and was impressed by her previous works. In the same month, Ragini Dwivedi confirmed her presence. Additionally, Siddique, Nishan, Lalu Alex, and Janardhanan were subsequently added to the cast.

By early February, rumours spread about Basil Joseph's involvement in the film, but these claims were refuted by Anoop. Sabitha Anand was present during the commencement of filming. The same month, Odisha native Chandu Naik joined the cast. Naik, who came to Kerala aspiring to act alongside Mohanlal, performs the role of a kitchen boy. In April, Babauraj was reported to be part of the cast. Meera Jasmine makes a cameo as the love interest of Mohanlal's character. Basil plays a cameo role as a psychologist.

=== Filming ===
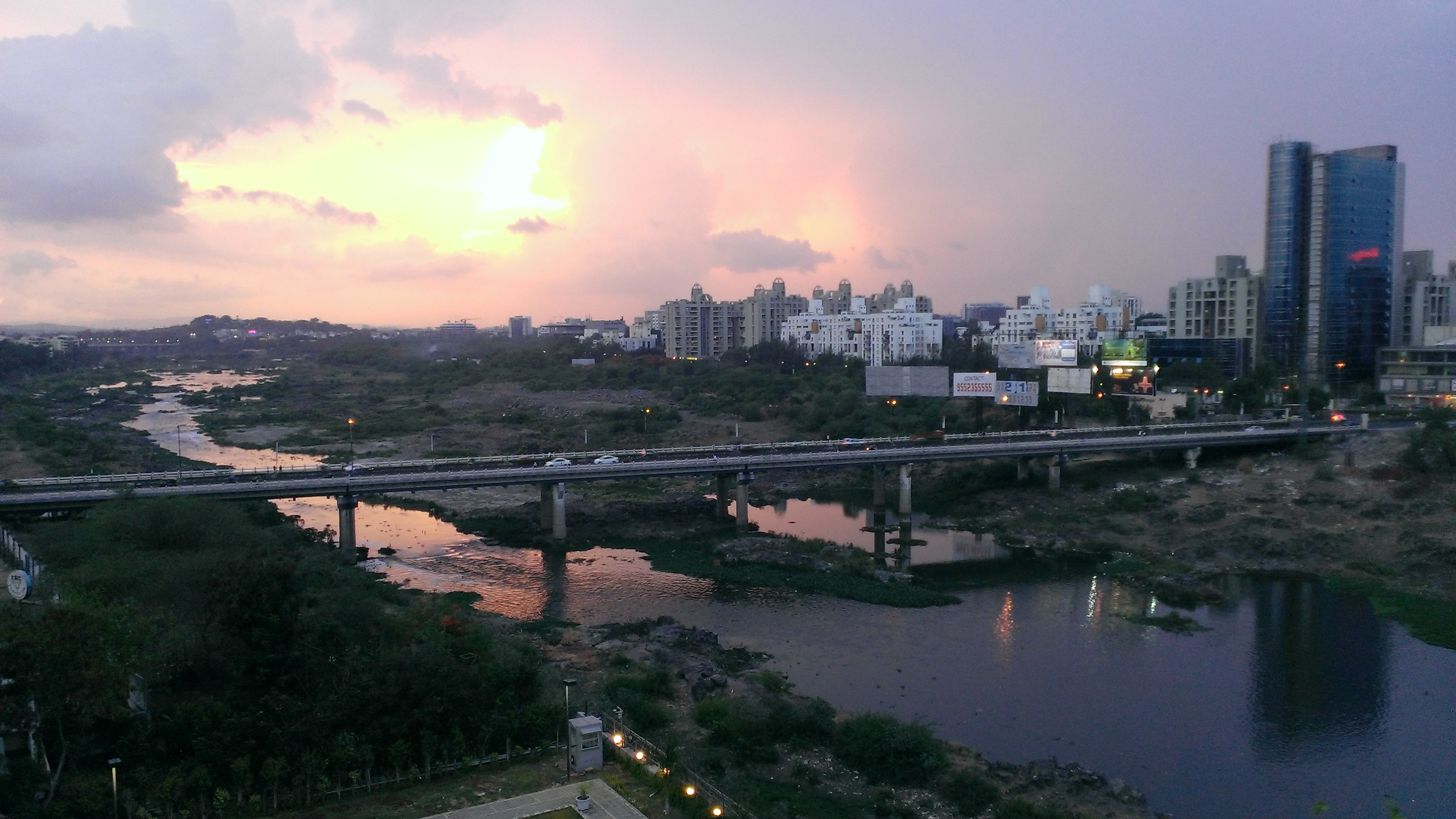
Hridayapoorvam was also shot in Pune, the primary setting of the film.

Filming was originally scheduled to begin in December 2024; however, it was subsequently postponed to 10 February 2025. Principal photography commenced on the rescheduled date in Kochi, following a ceremonial pooja. The opening shot featured Siddique and Sabitha Anand. The shooting of scenes featuring Mohanlal started four days later. Malavika joined the sets on the 22 February. The first schedule concluded on 16 March in Thekkady, with scenes filmed in the hills and tea estates.

In the following month, production shifted to Pune for the subsequent phase of shooting, after the completion of the Kerala portions. In addition to Mohanlal and Malavika, Sangita, Sangeeth, and Lalu Alex also participated in this schedule, which spanned a month. In addition to Pune, filming took place on the outskirts, including Lonavala. Regarding the choice of locations, Anthikad said that the story was already set in Pune (with some portions in Kochi) when Akhil first narrated it to him. Filming wrapped up on 19 May 2025. Hridayapoorvam marks Mohanlal's first film since Vasthuhara (1991) to use sync sound, after more than 30 years.

== Music ==
The film's music was composed by Justin Prabhakaran. The composition of songs began in October 2024. The lyrics were written by Manu Manjith. The lyrics for the Hindi song was provided by Raj Shekhar.

== Release ==
=== Theatrical ===
In November 2024, Aashirvad Cinemas announced Mohanlal's upcoming film line-up, with several releases planned for the following months and into 2025. Among them, Hridayapoorvam was scheduled for release on 28 August 2025. The film was released on 28 August 2025.

=== Home media ===
The post theatrical streaming rights of the film is acquired by JioHotstar. The film began streaming on the platform from 26 September 2025 in Malayalam and dubbed versions of Tamil, Hindi, Telugu and Kannada languages.

== Reception ==
=== Critical reception ===
Hridayapoorvam received mixed to positive reviews from critics, with praise directed at Mohanlal's performance, the emotional core of the story, and the light-hearted treatment of sensitive themes.

S. R. Praveen of The Hindu described the film as a light-hearted entertainer, noting that while the plot is thin, Sathyan Anthikad's treatment and Mohanlal's charm make it engaging. Janani K of India Today praised the film as a "straight-from-the-heart rendition of a warm, fuzzy drama" that sensitively handles grief and second chances.

Avinash Ramachandran of Cinema Express called the film a "warm hug of a film," appreciating the reunion of Mohanlal and Sathyan Anthikad as a reminder of their legacy in Malayalam cinema. The review commended Anu Moothedath's cinematography, Justin Prabhakaran's score, and the screenplay's subtle surprises, while noting Mohanlal's comedic timing as a highlight. Vishal Menon of The Hollywood Reporter India described the film as a "delightfully old-school comedy about life's second chances," praising Mohanlal's performance and the film's nostalgic appeal.

The Times of India 's Anna Mathews gave the film a favourable review, calling it a "feel-good family film" anchored by Mohanlal's charisma. It praised the performances of Malavika Mohanan, Sangita, and Sangeeth Prathap, while noting that some characters felt superfluous and that the emotional depth was uneven. Mudit Bhatnagar of Times Now noted that the film is built around "a borrowed heart that finds love," highlighting Mohanlal's dignified performance and Sathyan Anthikad's sensitive direction. However, it also observed that the storytelling leaned heavily on sentimentality.
