= Sagar Surya =

Indian actor

- Born: 24 March 1993 (age 33); Thrissur, Kerala, India
- Occupation: Actor
- Years active: 2018–present

Sagar Surya is an Indian actor who appears in Malayalam films and television shows. He is best known for portraying comedy and drama roles on screen. He received widespread acclaim for his role as the antagonist Don Sebastian in the Joju George directorial Pani (2024).

== Career ==
He started his acting career in 2018 with Thatteem Mutteem on Mazhavil Manorama. His first movie was Kuruthi in 2021.

== Personal life ==
Sagar graduated college with a Master of Engineering from Government Engineering College, Thrissur before starting his acting career. He has one brother. His mother passed away in 2020.

== Filmography ==
=== Films ===
- All films are in Malayalam language unless otherwise noted.

| Year | Title | Role | Notes |
|---|---|---|---|
| 2021 | Kuruthi | Vishnu | |
| 2022 | Upacharapoorvam Gunda Jayan | Sali | |
| 2022 | Kuri | Maji | |
| 2022 | Jana Gana Mana | Party Member | |
| 2022 | Jo and Jo | Tuttu | |
| 2022 | Kaapa | Biju Thrivikraman | |
| 2023 | Kasargold | Rihan | |
| 2024 | Pani | Don Sebastian | |
| 2025 | Dheeram | George | |
| 2026 | Prakambanam | Punyalan | |
| 2026 | Derby | Fejin | |
| 2026 | Ananthan Kaadu | Podiyan Ananthan | Bilingual film |
| 2026 | Disco | | |
| 2026 | Bouma | Jacob | |

=== Television ===
| Year | Title | Role | Channel | Language |
|---|---|---|---|---|
| 2018–2022 | Thatteem Mutteem | Aadhi Shankaran / Aadhi | Mazhavil Manorama | Malayalam |
| 2023 | Bigg Boss (Malayalam season 5) | Himself as contestant | Asianet | Malayalam |
