= Grace Antony =

Indian actress

- Born: Mulanthuruthy, Kerala, India
- Education: Sree Sankaracharya University of Sanskrit
- Occupation: Actress
- Years active: 2016–present
- Known for: Kumbalangi Nights
- Spouse: Aby Tom Cyriac (m. 2025)

Grace Antony aka Mary Gracy is an Indian actress, model and classical dancer who works in the Malayalam film industry. Her debut film was Happy Wedding (2016).

== Personal life ==
Grace Antony married music composer Aby Tom Cyriac on 9 September 2025 in a private ceremony at the Our Lady of Dolours Roman Catholic Church, Thuthiyoor, Kerala, after being in a relationship for nine years.

== Career ==
She rose to fame after her performance in the Mollywood hit film Kumbalangi Nights (2019). She achieved further critical and commercial success for her lead roles in films like Thamaasha (2019), Halal love story (2020), Saajan Bakery Since 1962 (2021), Kanakam Kaamini Kalaham (2021), Rorschach (2022) and Appan (2022).

== Filmography ==
=== Films ===
Key
†	Denotes films that have not yet been released

- Note: All films are in Malayalam, unless otherwise noted.

Year	Title	Role	Notes	Ref.
2016	Happy Wedding	Teena	Debut	
2017	Lakshyam	Shalini's friend		
2017	Matchbox	Geethu		
2017	Kambhoji	Kunjolu		
2017	Georgettan's Pooram	Pallan's wife		
2019	Kumbalangi Nights	Simi		
2019	Thamaasha	Safiya		
2019	Prathi Poovankozhi	Sheeba		
2020	Halal Love Story	Suhara	OTT release through Amazon Prime Video	
2021	Sajan Bakery Since 1962	Mary		
2021	Kanakam Kaamini Kalaham	Haripriya	OTT release through Disney+ Hotstar	
2022	Pathrosinte Padappukal	Christina		
2022	Chattambi	Sicily		
2022	Rorschach	Sujatha		
2022	Appan	Molykutty	OTT release through SonyLIV	
2022	Saturday Night	Susan Maria Paul		
2022	Padachone Ingalu Kaatholee	Sakhav Indhu		
2024	Vivekanandan Viralanu	Diana		
2024	Nunakuzhi	Rashmita Ranjith		
2024	Extra Decent	Nishima		
2025	Paranthu Po	Glory	Tamil film	
2026	Patriot	Anju		
2026	Avaraachan & Sons	Bincy		
2026	Padayaatra	Nurse		

=== Web series ===
Year	Title	Role	Notes
2024	Nagendran's Honeymoons	Lillykutty	Disney+ Hotstar

=== Short films ===
Year	Title	Role	Notes	Ref.
2020	K-nowledge	Directorial Debut	Released on YouTube	

=== Dubbing ===
Year	Title	Language	Dubbed For	Notes	Ref.
2024	Malaikottai Vaaliban	Malayalam	Sonalee Kulkarni		
