= Law and Order (2026 film) =

2026 Indian drama film

- Theatrical release poster
- Directed by: Ranjith
- Written by: Udaykrishna
- Produced by: Premachandran AG; Maha Subair
- Starring: Mammootty; Prakash Varma; Joy Mathew; Suresh Krishna; Abhirami; Shankar Ramakrishnan; V K Prakash
- Cinematography: Prasanth Raveendran
- Edited by: Manoj Kannoth
- Music by: Bijibal; Joe Daniel
- Production companies: Mahasubair Moviekshetra; Satyam Cinemas
- Release date: 18 September 2026
- Running time: 158 minutes
- Country: India
- Language: Malayalam
- Box office: ₹89 lakhs

Law and Order is a 2026 Malayalam-language action drama film directed by Ranjith and written by Udaykrishna. The film stars Prakash Varma in the lead role, alongside an ensemble cast featuring a special appearance by Mammootty, who reprising his character Karikkamuri Shanmughan from Ranjith's 2004 film Black. The film received negative reviews from critics and was a box office bomb.

== Plot ==
DYSP Balagopal (Prakash Varma) is a decorated officer known for his absolute integrity. His disciplined world shatters when his college-going son, Vivek, is driven to suicide by a sprawling drug empire run by the sadistic brothers Pacha and Chotu (Shersha Sherif).

Seeking justice outside bureaucratic red tape, Balagopal takes under his wing five firebrand police academy graduates—Arun, Benny, Firoz, Biju, and Seban—forming a raw, adrenaline-fueled rookie squad. However, the mission turns catastrophic when Arun is brutally murdered by Pacha while investigating the syndicate.

Left broken, enraged, and hungry for blood, the remaining four rookies establish a clandestine "renegade" task force operating from the shadows. As the city streets transform into a brutal war zone, the escalating chaos awakens a sleeping giant: Karikkamuri Shanmughan(Mammootty). The legendary mastermind who once ruled the city's underbelly is forced out of retirement for one final, fatal reckoning.

== Cast ==
- Prakash Varma as DSP Balagopal
- Mammootty as Karikkamuri Shanmughan (extended cameo appearance)
- Limson K Sunny as Jimbruttan
- Joy Mathew as IG Dhananjayan IPS
- Suresh Krishna as Divakaran,Balagopal's elder brother
- Abhirami as Veni Balagopal,Balagopal's wife
- Shankar Ramakrishnan as Kerala Chief Minister Rajendran
- V. K. Prakash as Joshuva Yohan
- Sudheesh as Ravi
- Bheeman Raghu as ASI Nasser
- Ilavarasu as Thangavel
- Devan as Yousif Ali Khan
- Bobby Kurian as Denny Padaveedan
- Mohan Jose as Mammali
- Johny Antony as Ernakulam Distrct Judge
- Shersha Sherief as Prahlad Parekh a.k.a. 'Pacha'
- Rinosh George as Chotu
- Gayathri Ashok as Bella
- Anand Manmadhan as Vivek
- Don Michael SI Biju Kurian
- Shanood Ibrahim as SI Firoz mk
- Rithudev Ayyappan as SI Arun Ayyappan
- Sajal Sudarshan as SI Benny Vargheese
- Nijad Babu Thomas as SI Sebastian Paul

== Production ==
=== Development ===
The film marks the first-ever collaboration between director Ranjith and mainstream commercial writer Udaykrishna. Principal photography took place across urban locations in Kerala, focusing on capturing gritty action sequences and high-stakes police procedural setups. The project is jointly produced by Premachandran AG and Mahasubair under the banners of Satyam Cinemas and Mahasubair Moviekshetra.

== Music ==
The original score for Law and Order is composed by Bijibal, who brings a distinct intensity and atmospheric grit to the film's high-stakes police procedural and underworld sequences. The background score became a point of considerable discussion in pre-release media following public comments and clarifications regarding trailer mixing and scoring responsibilities.

Complementing the tense score, the film's soundtrack features original songs composed by Joe Daniel. The musical rollout includes promotional singles designed to build anticipation ahead of the theatrical release, with tracks that blend modern electronic elements with the gritty, urban tone of Ranjith's directorial style.

== Release ==
Law and Order was released on September 18, 2026.

The film was initially announced to hit screens on July 24, 2026, but the makers later postponed the theatrical rollout to September 4 and subsequently revised it to September 18. Promoted as a heavy-hitting mass action entertainer, the marketing campaign ramped up in August 2026 with the release of the official teaser, promotional singles, and character posters highlighting the clash between institutional law enforcement and the criminal underworld.

== Reception ==
The film received negative reviews from critics. Cinema Express critic Vivek Santhosh described Law and Order as a "stale and unintentionally funny cop saga", criticising Udaykrishna's writing and Ranjith's direction as dated and uninspired.

Anandu Suresh of The Indian Express rated the film 0.5/5 and described it as "Ranjith turns Mammootty’s most iconic character into a joke".

The film had a weak opening, recording an India net collection of ₹29 lakh on its opening day. Its worldwide gross was reported to be ₹33 lakh.
