= Prakambanam =

2026 Indian Malayalam-language horror comedy film

- Theatrical release poster
- Directed by: Vijesh Panathur
- Written by: Sreehari Vadakkan
- Produced by: Sreejith K. S. Kaarthekeyan S. Sudhish N.
- Starring: Ganapathi S. Poduval; Sagar Surya; Al Ameen
- Cinematography: Alby Antony
- Edited by: Sooraj E. S.
- Music by: Songs: Bibin Ashok; Background Score: Sanker Sharma
- Production companies: Navarasa Films; Stone Bench Studio
- Distributed by: Navarasa Films
- Release date: 30 January 2026
- Running time: 128 minutes
- Country: India
- Language: Malayalam
- Budget: ₹4 crore
- Box office: ₹21 crore

Prakambanam (transl. Vibration) is a 2026 Indian Malayalam-language horror comedy film directed by Vijesh Panathur and written by Sreehari Vadakkan. It was produced by Navarasa Films, in association with Stone Bench Studio. The film stars Ganapathi S. Poduval, Sagar Surya and Al Ameen in the lead roles, alongside Mallika Sukumaran, Azees Nedumangad and Rajesh Madhavan in supporting roles. The plot follows three friends in a college hostel whose lives are upended when one of them becomes possessed by the other person's grandmother's spirit.

The film was released on 30 January 2026.

== Plot ==
Rukmini, a Hindu communist leader, is holding rituals for deceased relatives, much to the displeasure of her atheist sons Rameshan and Raghavan.

Sidharth, Antony alias Punyalan and Shankaran are three senior college students who stay at a mens' hostel. They are involved in student politics, representing the communist party, but have never won a mock election. In their final year at college, they want to win the upcoming mock election. One day, Sidharth gets a call from his grandfather, Madhavan, telling him to come home. It turns out that Rukmini, who is revealed to be Sidharth's grandmother passed away and as both his father Raghavan and uncle Rameshan are atheists, they are not willing to go to Kashi and spread her ashes across the Ganges, he requests Sidharth to do so. Although initially reluctant, as Sidharth is an atheist himself, he grees to do so after the mock election and takes a small amount of Rukmini's ashes in a small container. Punyalan and Shankaran followed Sidharth to his home out of concern and asked a local bomb maker if he could make a bomb for an explosion if they lost the mock election, and the bomb maker decides to come to the hostel. Once Sidharth returns to the hostel with the ashes, Punyalan and Shankaran mistake them for snuff. Punyalan snorts it first, but then he sneezed, a massive gust of wind blew across the room and his nose began to bleed. Seeing this, Shankaran threw the container out of the window. During the mock election speeches, when Sidharth was struggling for words, Punyalan came up to stage and spoke in fluent Sanskrit and Malayalam, winning the audience. Due to this speech, the communist party would win a landslide. Sidharth and Shankaran started noticing weird behaviors in Punyalan, such as dressing and acting like an old woman. When they looked into a mirror they saw Rukmini's reflection and understood that when Punyalan sneezed, Rukmini would possess him. After finding out what happened to the ashes, Sidharth hits Punyalan and Shankaran.

Punyalan manages to get a date with his girlfriend Vedhika at her house while her parents are away. This angers Sasi, Vedhika's bestie, who calls her father and informs him of Punyalan in his house. Just before he enters, Punyalan sneezes, letting Rukmini take over, who has to be knocked out by Vedhika. Sidharth and Shankaran try to find many ways to exorcise him and when they go to a beach where Hindu rituals take place, Punyalan, possessed by Rukmini, attacks a couple who were kissing on the beach. This leads the trio getting expelled. They explain the situation to Vedhika and they goes to the exorcist Stanislavski, who tells them they have until midnight to find Rukmini's ashes. Rukmini possesses Punyalan and reveals that she wants to kill Madhavan.

When they go to Sidharth's house, Rukmini reveals that Madhavan, in trying to help her, accidentally hit her head too hard with his hand, which lead to her death. Almost at midnight, they return to the hostel and try to find the container, but to no avail. They find Stanislavski, who is in a rush to leave, and beg him to help them. He uses anti-ghost spray as a temporary solution and runs away. Now, Punyalan's parents, concerned about him, enter Stanislavski's estate. All the spirits that Stanislavski captured over the past have released and demonic spirits took control of Rukmini's soul. Suddenly, all the spirits disappear and Punyalan is free rom Rukmini. It is revealed that while Stanislavski escaped, he picked up the bomb maker, who picked up the container as he was leaving the hostel and snorted the ashes, thinking it was snuff. As they drove away, two spirits could be seen on the back of the vehicle.

During a post credits scene, Madhavan is on a beach in Goa, but then he runs away after seeing Stanislavski, who is possessed by Rukmini.

== Cast ==
- Ganapathi S. Poduval as Sidharth K. Raghavan "Sidhu" (Kannan)
- Sagar Surya as Antony "Punyalan"
- Al Ameen as Shankar Das "Shankaran"
- Mallika Sukumaran as Chemboth Rukmini "Chembothamma", Sidhu's grandmother
- Sheethal Joseph as Vedika "Vedhu"
- Rajesh Madhavan as Stanislavski "Stany"
- Azees Nedumangad as K. Rameshan, Sidhu's paternal uncle
- Kalabhavan Navas as K. Raghavan, Sidhu's father
- Alexander Prasanth as Warden Santhosh "M-N"
- P. P. Kunhikrishnan as Kannoth Madhavan, Sidhu's grandfather
- Kudassanad Kanakam as Annamma, M-N's mother
- Abhijith Suresh as Pattar
- Lal Jose as Vedika's father (cameo appearance)
- Sanesh Guinness as bomb maker
- Subin Tarzan as Dinil Sasi, Vedika's bestie

== Production ==
=== Development ===
The film was officially announced in April 2025 as a “spooky college horror-comedy.” It marks the solo directorial debut of Vijesh Panathur, who previously co-directed Nadikalil Sundari Yamuna (2023). The story was penned by Panathur himself, with a screenplay by newcomer Sreehari Vadakkan. The film is produced by Navarasa Films, in association with Karthik Subbaraj’s Stone Bench Studio.

=== Casting ===
In early 2025, Ganapathi and Sagar Surya were cast as the leads. The film features Kalabhavan Navas in one of his final film roles before his take off.

=== Filming ===
Principal photography began in June 2025 in Kochi. The film was primarily shot in a college hostel setting in Ernakulam and rural locations in Kannur. Filming was completed in multiple schedules and wrapped up in late 2025.

== Music ==
Prakambanam consists of 5 songs composed by Bibin Ashok while Sankar Sharma provides the score for the movie. First Single Vayojana Zombie was released on 23 January 2026.

Track listing
| No. | Title | Lyrics | Singer(s) | Length |
|---|---|---|---|---|
| 1. | "Vayojana Zombie" | Suhail Koya | Hanan Shaah, Aswin Vijayan, Milan Joy, Amithav Suresh & Bibin Ashok. | 3:25 |
| 2. | "Local Sigma Boys" | Heykarthii | Anand Sreeraj, Ayraan, Aswin Vijayan, MIlan Joy & Amithav Suresh | 3:18 |
| 3. | "Innenthe" | Manu Manjith | Aravind Dileep Nair & Bibin Ashok | 3:35 |
| 4. | "Thalla Vibe" | Vinayak Sasikumar | Pranavam Sasi, Pushpavathy, Amithav Suresh, Amal C Ajith & Milan Joy | 3:24 |
| 5. | "Ugraroopini" | Hareesh Mohanan | Vaikom Vijayalakshmi | 2:56 |
| Total length: | | | | 16:38 |

== Release ==
The film was released in theatres on 30 January 2026. The post-theatrical streaming rights of the film is acquired by ZEE5. The film began streaming on the platform from 13 March 2026 The satellite rights of the film is acquired by Zee Keralam and premiered on 15 April 2026.

== Reception ==
=== Critical Response ===
Vivek Santhosh of Cinema Express gave the film 3/5 stars, stating that while the first half was "hit and miss," the film "clicks once it embraces its madness" in the second half.

Onmanorama noted that while the film lacks the emotional depth of contemporary dramas, it succeeds as a fun hostel-life entertainer with "hilarious incidents that drive the narrative."
