= Ranjitha Menon =

Indian actress

- Born: Thrissur, Kerala, India
- Occupations: Actress; model
- Years active: 2019-Present
- Notable work: Saajan Bakery Since 1962; Pathrosinte Padappukal
- Relatives: Nila Menon (Mother)

Ranjitha Menon is an Indian actress and model who predominantly works in the Malayalam film Industry. She is known for her role as a heroine in the films Saajan Bakery Since 1962 (2020), Pathrosinte Padappukal (2022) and the TV Series Poacher (2024). Her role as Merin in Saajan Bakery Since 1962 has been critically acclaimed by film critics. She has acted in the role of Achala Joseph in the TV series Poacher (2024) directed by Richie Mehta and produced by Alia Bhatt.

== Filmography ==
Year	Title	Role	Notes	Ref.
2020	Maniyarayile Ashokan	Asha	Debut Film	
2021	Saajan Bakery Since 1962	Merin		
2022	Pathrosinte Padappukal	Ammu		
2024	Poacher	Achala	TV Miniseries	
2024	Manorajyam	Miya		
