= Daayam =

- Directed by: Prasanth Vijay
- Written by: Indu Lakshmi
- Produced by: Jessy P
- Starring: Aathira Rajeev; Pradeep Kumar; K.R. Aromal; Rithudev Ayyappan
- Cinematography: Rakesh Dharan
- Edited by: Christy Sebastian
- Music by: Varkey
- Production company: One Pixel Revolution
- Distributed by: ManoramaMAX
- Release date: 31 October 2023 (MAMI Mumbai 2023)
- Running time: 81 minute
- Country: India
- Language: Malayalam

Daayam (Inheritance) is an Indian Malayalam language film written by Indu Lakshmi, directed by Prasanth Vijay and produced by Jessy P. The film stars Aathira Rajeev, Pradeep Kumar, K.R. Aromal, Rithudev Ayyappan, Harikrishnan, Bala Shankar and others.

Daayam was premiered at MAMI Mumbai Film Festival 2023 and International Film Festival of Kerala 2023.

== Cast ==
- Aathira Rajeev as Kalyani
- Pradeep Kumar as Vijayraghavan "Raghu" Nair, Kalyani's father
- K.R. Aromal as Ansar
- Rithudev Ayyappan as Unni
- K.P.A.C. Boben as Senior Police Officer
- Jithesh Damodar as Keshu
- Amrutha Elizabeth as Hema
- Ranjini George as Laila
- Harikrishnan as Syam
- Bala Shankar as Dasan

== Production ==
The film was planned during Covid-19 pandemic and decided on in-house filming, but was delayed.

== Release ==
The film was premiered at MAMI Mumbai 2023 and International Film Festival of Kerala 2023.

== Critical reception ==
Saibal Chatterjee of NDTV stated "The beauty - and the power - of Daayam stems from the nuanced depiction of the gradual changes that Kalyani undergoes as the world creeps in on her and a recipe book she has inherited from her mother reveals to her the need to read between the lines and decipher what the dead woman has left unexpressed." S.R. Praveen for The Hindu observed "Prasanth captures the mood of the house, making us feel the presence of the absent mother. He handles the subject almost the same way as Kalyani deals with grief, in a gentle, almost unnoticeable manner, punctuated by a few emotional bursts that never go overboard." Nirmal Jovial of The Week noted "The film delves into the pain of confronting the hypocrisy of an "idol", unveiling the true nature of the character and the resulting insecurity it instils in the teenager. Towards the end, the audience witnesses her decision not to submit but to confront these challenges." Sajin Shrijith of The New Indian Express noted "Though sufficiently dialogue-heavy, Daayam also remembers that some moments work better in silence." Princy Alexander of Onmanorama opined "The painful reality of authority, power dynamics at the workplace and home, sexism and victimisation also is deftly handled in this one-hour 21-minute movie."
