= Avaraachan & Sons =

2026 Indian comedy drama film

- Theatrical release poster
- Directed by: Thamby
- Written by: Thamby; Joseph Vijeesh
- Produced by: Listin Stephen
- Starring: Biju Menon; Sreenath Bhasi; Ganapathi S. Poduval; Grace Antony; Akhila Bhargavan; Parvathy Babu
- Cinematography: Sajith Purushan
- Edited by: Akash Joseph Varghese
- Music by: Sanal Dev
- Production company: Magic Frames
- Distributed by: Magic Frames
- Release date: 2 October 2026
- Running time: 134 minutes
- Country: India
- Language: Malayalam

Avarachan & Sons is a 2026 Indian Malayalam-language family comedy-drama film directed by Thamby (in his directorial debut) and produced by Listin Stephen under the banner of Magic Frames. The film stars Biju Menon in the titular role, alongside Sreenath Bhasi, Ganapathi S. Poduval, Grace Antony, Akhila Bhargavan, Parvathy Babu, Vinay Forrt and Johny Antony.

== Plot ==
Set against the coastal backdrop of Chellanam, the story follows Avarachan, a heavy-drinking, wayward, and rowdy father whose reckless actions frequently ignite local feuds and tension. His two grown-up sons, Jaison and Jaimon, constantly find themselves running damage control to clear up messes caused by their father.

Following a major scandal and a booze-fueled escalation that triggers a violent local conflict, Avarachan is packed off and forced to flee his hometown, hiding out in his elder sister Eliyamma's home in the high ranges and hills of North Kerala. Cut off from his usual environment, the displacement forces the dysfunctional family and their surrounding social relationships-including a local neighbor Bincy and other eccentric characters-through a chaotic process of self-discovery and unexpected reconciliation.

== Cast ==
- Biju Menon as Avarachan
- Sreenath Bhasi as Jaison, Avarachan's son
- Ganapathi S. Poduval as Jaimon, Avarachan's son
- Grace Antony as Bincy
- Akhila Bhargavan as Keerthi, Jaison's wife
- Parvathy Babu as Aneeta, Jaimon's wife
- Urvashi as Thresiakutty (Cameo Appearance)
- Vinay Forrt as Ani
- Johny Antony as Pavithran
- Kottayam Nazeer as Kuriyachan
- Sabumon Abdusamad as Fr.Joseph Chalisserry
- Pauly Valsan as Eliyamma, Avarachan's elder sister
- Shaju Sreedhar as Church Priest Fr.Eldhos
- Vettukili Prakash (Cameo Appearance)

== Reception ==
Avaraachan & Sons received mixed-to-positive reviews from critics upon its release, with major praise directed at Biju Menon's effortless lead performance and the film's warm, old-fashioned family entertainer vibe.

Reviewing for Mathrubhumi, Sia Viju awarded the film 3.5 out of 5 stars, describing it as a "warm and chaotic family entertainer" and writing that "Biju Menon anchors the film with a performance that plays to his considerable strength as an actor." She highlighted that the film's charm lies in its simplicity, noting how the narrative successfully blends generational friction, humor, and organic emotional beats without leaning too heavily into melodrama.

The New Indian Express noted that "Biju Menon's familiar charm carries a wobbly family tale." The reviewer commended the chemistry between Biju Menon and Pauly Valsan as well as Sreenath Bhasi’s grounded portrayal of a responsible elder son, though they felt the narrative occasionally lost its primary focus on the family unit during prolonged subplots.

Writing for Malayala Manorama, critics praised the movie as a comforting "prodigal father" counter-narrative, singling out the situational comedy of the first half, Vinay Forrt's striking dark humor performance, and the technical contributions of cinematographer Sajith Purushan and editor Akash Joseph Varghese. Similarly, The Hindu noted that the film "relies heavily on Biju Menon's familiar charm to keep this old-fashioned family entertainer watchable."
