= Sangeeth Prathap =

Indian actor and editor

- Born: India
- Occupations: Actor; editor
- Years active: 2020–present
- Awards: Kerala State Film Awards

Sangeeth Prathap is an Indian actor and film editor who works in Malayalam cinema. He made his film debut with Hridayam (2022) as an actor, and is best known for playing Amal Davis in Premalu (2024). In 2023, he won the Kerala State Film Award for Best Editor for Little Miss Rawther.

== Career ==
He started his career as an editor. In 2022, He made his debut in acting through Hridayam. His breakthrough role was Amal Davis in Premalu.

In 2024, he was honored with the Kerala State Film Award for Best Editor for his work on the film Little Miss Rawther.

== Filmography ==
Key
| † | Denotes films that have not yet been released |

=== As actor ===
| Year | Title | Role | Notes | Ref. |
|---|---|---|---|---|
| 2019 | Helen | Uncredited | Also assistant editor | |
| 2022 | Hridayam | Baiju | | |
| 2022 | Pathrosinte Padappukal | Tattoo artist | Also editor | |
| 2022 | Super Sharanya | Delso | | |
| 2023 | Little Miss Rawther | Shine | Also editor | |
| 2024 | Premalu | Amal Davis | | |
| 2025 | Bromance | Hariharasudhan | | |
| 2025 | Thudarum | Kiran | | |
| 2025 | Hridayapoorvam | Jerry Thomas | | |
| 2026 | Baby Girl | Rishi | | |
| 2026 | Mollywood Times | Arjun Haridas | | |
| 2026 | Bethlehem Kudumba Unit | Joel Davis | | |
| 2026 | Soulmates - Oru Saathukkudi Pranayam | Joel Davis | Short film | |
| 2026 | It's a Medical Miracle | Ruben | Debut movie as the lead | |
| 2027 | Hello Dear | TBA | | |

=== As editor ===
| Year | Film | Notes | Ref. |
|---|---|---|---|
| 2019 | Helen | Assistant editor | |
| 2022 | Pathrosinte Padappukal | | |
| 2022 | 4 Years | | |
| 2023 | Little Miss Rawther | | |
| 2024 | Jai Ganesh | | |
| 2025 | Sarkeet | | |

== Accolades ==
| Year | Award | Category | Film | Result | Ref |
|---|---|---|---|---|---|
| 2023 | 54th Kerala State Film Awards | Best Editor | Little Miss Rawther | Won | |
