= Kannur Squad =

2023 Malayalam film by Roby Varghese Raj

- Theatrical release poster
- Directed by: Roby Varghese Raj
- Screenplay by: Muhammed Shafi; Rony David Raj
- Story by: Muhammed Shafi
- Produced by: Mammootty
- Starring: Mammootty; Azees Nedumangad; Rony David Raj; Shabareesh Varma
- Cinematography: Muhammed Rahil
- Edited by: Praveen Prabhakar
- Music by: Sushin Shyam
- Production company: Mammootty Kampany
- Distributed by: Wayfarer Films (India); Truth Global Films (Overseas)
- Release date: 28 September 2023
- Running time: 161 minutes
- Country: India
- Language: Malayalam
- Budget: est. ₹26–32 crore
- Box office: est. ₹80−82 crore

Kannur Squad is a 2023 Indian Malayalam-language police procedural action thriller film directed by Roby Varghese Raj in his directorial debut, written by Muhammed Shafi and Rony David Raj, and produced by Mammootty under Mammootty Kampany. The film stars Mammootty, Azees Nedumangad, Rony David Raj, Shabareesh Varma, Kishore, and Vijayaraghavan. It is based on the real story of a team of police officers who were part of the Kannur Squad, a crime investigation unit, formed by former Kannur SP S. Sreejith IPS.

The film was officially announced in January 2023 under the tentative title Megastar 421, with the title announced by Mammootty on 11 February 2023 as Kannur Squad. Principal photography began on 27 December 2022, with filming taking place in Kannur, Kasaragod, Wayanad, Ernakulam, Athirapilly, Thiruvananthapuram, Pala, Wai, Pune, Mumbai, Uttar Pradesh, Rajasthan, Belgaum, Mangalore and Coimbatore, concluding on 6 April 2023 in Wayanad. The film's music is composed by Sushin Shyam, while the cinematography and editing are handled by Muhammed Rahil and Praveen Prabhakar.

Kannur Squad was released on 28 September 2023 and received critical acclaim from critics with praise for its cast performances, direction, script, cinematography and musical score. The film was a major commercial success and earned more than ₹80 crore worldwide, emerging to become one of the highest-grossing Malayalam film of all time and the fourth highest-grossing Malayalam film of 2023.

== Plot ==
2015: ASI George Martin and his team of CPO officers: Jose, Jayan and Shafi, known as the Kannur Squad, head out to search for a political goon, who is in a hideout in the Kannur-Virajpet forest area. They catch him, but coincidentally find the hanged body of a stranger in the forest. With the case proving to be ruled out as a suicide, George believes that the stranger was murdered and sets out to find the real perpetrator. The squad identifies the suicider as Murugan, a lorry driver, and the investigation moves to Coimbatore, where the culprit is revealed to be Murugan's wife Vanaja and her nephew Rakesh, who was actually cheated by Murugan. Shortly after this incident, Jayan is found to have taken a bribe from the sand mafia and the group gets disbanded.

2017: A rich NRI businessman Abdul Wahab was dacoited and murdered in Kasaragod. Unable to find any leads, SP Manu Needhi Cholan assigns the Kannur Squad to investigate the case even though there is the shadow of the bribery scandal and there is a lot of resistance to have the group investigate this crime. The squad begins their investigation, where they capture the suspect Riyas, as he bought two SIM cards and his urine sample(the culprit was affected by kidney stone) was found at the crime scene, and interrogates him. Riyas reveals that he used to work at a hotel in Qatar and had met the hotel owner's sons Ameer Shah and Zulfiqar Ali, who wanted money for their new business.

Riyas reveals that he found that Wahab had bundles of money, while he was working on house maintenance work and had informed Ameer and Zulfiqar, who along with the other two men Hathooda and Bambiha, barged into Wahab's house at night. They find there is no money and brutally kill Wahab, injure his son Ramzan and leave his daughter Farha assaulted by Ameer. The squad later sets out to track down the culprits, where they reach Mumbai for the investigation and learn that Ameer had made a call to Shiju Velayudhan. They track down Shiju's address and capture him. Shiju tells that Ameer and Zulfiqar had left for Bhubaneswar.

However, the squad learns that Ameer and Zulfiqar lied to Shiju about their location and they are presently in Faizabad. The squad reaches Faizabad and is assisted by constable Yogesh Yadav of the UP Police, where they learn that a person named Pawan picked up Ameer and Zulfiqar from the railway station. The squad arrives at Pawan's village in Tikri and learns that Ameer and Zulfiqar are at Hathooda's house, where they arrest Pawan after an intense battle with the villagers. The next morning, Pawan reveals that Ameer, Zulfiqar, Hathoda and Bambiha started committing robberies in order to start an ivory export trade and had set up markets in foreign countries and extended their trading to Kerala, Karnataka and other parts of India. Pawan tells that they are currently at a railway station in Payagpur.

The squad manages to capture Hathoda and Bambiha on the train leaving Payagpur. George directs Jose and Shafi to board the train, fearing that Ameer and Zulfiqar could be on the same train. Later, George and Jayakumar find out that Ameer and Zulfiqar have left from Payagpur to Babaganj and are heading to Nepal, with a possible chance of them being untraced. The squad soon finds Ameer and Zulfiqar's hideout in a forest near the India-Nepal border and an intense fight ensues, where the squad manages to arrest them with the help of Sashastra Seema Bal (SSB) and bring them back to Kerala thereby completing their mission successfully and also thank Yogesh Yadav for his help and cooperation and bid farewell to him.

== Cast ==
- Mammootty as ASI George Martin
- Azees Nedumangad as CPO Jose Skaria
- Rony David Raj as CPO Jayakumar "Jayan" P. Vasu
- Shabareesh Varma as CPO Muhammed Shafi T. A.
- Vijayaraghavan as SP Krishnanlal T. K., District Police Chief Kannur
- Kishore as SP Manu Needhi Cholan, District Police Chief Kasaragod
- Ankith Madhav as Constable Yogesh Yadav, Uttar Pradesh Police
- Arjun Radhakrishnan as Ameer Shah
- Dhruvan as Zulfikar Ali
- Deepak Parambol as Riyas
- Manoj K. U. as Abdul Wahab
- Shebin Benson as Ramzan Wahab, Wahab's son
- Resh Lamba as Hathoda
- Nalneesh Neel as Bambiha
- Afsana Lakshmi as Farha, Wahab's daughter
- S. P. Sreekumar as Shiju Velayudhan
- Sajin Cherukayil as Sreekumar
- Sarath Sabha as Vinod Kollattu
- Seju K. Eapen as DYSP Sajeevan
- Benzi Mathews as IG Tony Malayil
- Mulasi Arasi as Vanaja
- Sivadas Kannur as Premachandran
- Anoop Trivedi as Constable Jhandulal
- Avinash Panday as SI Laxman Trivedi
- Manohar Pandey as Pawan
- Sushmita Sur as Veerangana, Pawan's wife
- Saraswat Pandey as Guddu
- Shine Tom Chacko as CPO Subhash, Malappuram Special Branch (cameo appearance)
- Sunny Wayne as Reghu, a journalist (cameo appearance)

== Production ==
=== Development ===
Kannur Squad marks the fourth production of Mammootty's production Mammootty Kampany, following Nanpakal Nerathu Mayakkam (2022), Rorschach (2022) and Kaathal – The Core (2023). It marked the directorial debut of cinematographer Roby Varghese Raj, who had previously worked in Puthiya Niyamam (2016) and The Great Father (2017). The film was officially announced in January 2023 under the tentative title Megastar 421, with the title announced by Mammootty on 11 February 2023 as Kannur Squad.

Rony David Raj and Roby Varghese Raj's father, C. T. Rajan, had earlier produced the Mammootty starrer Mahayanam (1988). Rony and Muhammed Shafi had written a story on policemen during the COVID-19 lockdown, with the initial draft resembling a documentary. They decided to make it into a feature film and focus on four characters, thereby incorporating different issues related to the police system. They went through several changes by refining the script while preserving its core elements having done over 15 drafts over the course of two years. They approached Mammootty, who was impressed by the script and agreed to produce the film. The film required shooting in various locations across India and required extensive travel and other logistical aspects. Mammootty revealed in an interview that he plays an ASI in the film, which will be the first time a decade where he would play a police officer below the rank of a Sub-inspector. His other police roles were in Christopher (2023) as an ADGP, Puzhu (2022) as an IPS officer and Unda (2019) as an SI respectively. The action choreography was choreographed by Supreme Sundar, Rajashekhar, Kanal Kannan, Jolly Bastian, Run Ravi, PC Stunts, and Roby Varghese Raj.

=== Casting ===
Paragg Mehta was the casting director, marking his first Malayalam film. Lukman Avaran and Arjun Ashokan were initially considered for the roles of police officers but both declined due to scheduling conflicts. Prakash Raj and Sathyaraj were approached to play certain characters in the film. Shabeer Kallarakkal was considered for a negative role in the film, but declined as he was filming for King of Kotha (2023) at the time. Azees Nedumangad received a call from Mammootty's associate George about playing the police officer in the film. He previously worked with Mammootty in Parole (2018), One (2021) and CBI 5: The Brain (2022). Following the narration, he immediately accepted the role as he believed it was a shift from his earlier roles.

Arjun Radhakrishnan was cast to play the antagonist, having earlier played roles in Jhund (2022) and the webseries Rocket Boys. Roby Varghese cast him after seeing his performances in the films Pada (2022) and Dear Friend (2022). Manohar Pandey, who appeared in Adipurush (2023) and Gangubhai Kathiawadi (2022) was cast to play a key role. Ankit Madhav who originally hails from Pattambi was cast to play a Uttar Pradesh Police constable. To prepare for the character, he had conferred with a diction coach and had seen shows featuring North Indian policemen. His previously appeared in several Hindi ads and shows that made him comfortable speaking the language. Deepak Parambol, who was simultaneously shooting for Chaver (2023) and Kasargold (2023), also joined the cast.

=== Filming ===
Principal photography began on 27 December 2022 in Pala. Mammootty joined production on 1 January 2023. The Pune schedule began on 14 February 2023. Prior to Pune, filming took place in Wai. The team had a five-day schedule in Pune, filming in the old city areas, Katraj Tunnel and Pune Camp. The Mumbai schedule was completed in the first week of March 2023. It was followed by a 10-day schedule in Wayanad. After the completion of the Wayanad schedule, the team relocated to Kochi for its last schedule shoot at the Willingdon Island, Kochi. Some portions of filming took place in Maharaja's College, Ernakulam. The entire filming wrapped on 6 April 2023 in Wayanad after 91 days of shooting. The entire filming took place in Kannur, Kasaragod, Wayanad, Ernakulam, Athirappilly, Thiruvananthapuram, Pala, Wai, Pune, Mumbai, Uttar Pradesh, Rajasthan, Belgaum, Mangalore and Coimbatore. Post-production began on 16 April 2023 and lasted for 5–6 months. According to Rony David Raj, the film's was budgeted between ₹30–32 crore.

== Themes and influences ==
Kannur Squad is influenced by the police squad that originated in Kannur and came to be known as the Kannur Squad formed by the Kerala Transport Commissioner, ADGP S. Sreejith, who handpicked and groomed the officers while he was SP in the district and was created as an investigation unit. The squad is still operational and has a total of nine members, consisting of Additional SI Mathew Jose, and senior CPOs Raphy Ahmed M A, Vinodkumar P, Manojkumar K, Sunilkumar C, Jayarajan K, Reji Skaria, Rajasekar C K, and led by ASI Baby George.

The film focuses on four police officers, played by Mammootty, Rony David Raj, Shabaresh Varma, and Azeez Nedumangad. Mammooty plays George Martin, who is an ASI, and Rony David Raj, Shabaresh Varma, and Azeez Nedumangad play the driver and the two CPOs. Rony David Raj and Muhammed Shafi (who wrote the story and screenplay of the film) contacted the officers of the Kannur Squad. During their conversations, the officers shared details on different cases they had looked into and investigated. Rony David and Shafi were particularly interested in one case that caught their attention. S. Sreejith later met with Roby Varghese, Rony David and Shafi during the post-production phase.

== Music ==
Kannur Squad

Soundtrack album by Sushin Shyam
- Released: 2023
- Genre: Feature film soundtrack
- Length: 10:03
- Language: Malayalam
- Producer: Sushin Shyam

Sushin Shyam chronology
Romancham (2023)	Kannur Squad (2023)	Manjummel Boys (2024)

The songs and background score are composed by Sushin Shyam, with lyrics written by Vinayak Sasikumar. The films marks Sushin's third collaboration with Mammootty. The first song titled "Mrudhu Bhaave Dhruda Kruthye" was released on 27 September 2023. The motto of the Kerala Police 'Mrudhu Bhaave Dhruda Kruthye' serves as the inspiration for the songs' lyrics. The second song titled "Kalan Puli" was released on 6 October 2023.

Track listing
No.	Title	Lyrics	Singer(s)	Length
1.	"Mrudhu Bhaave Dhruda Kruthye"	Vinayak Sasikumar	Sushin Shyam, Sreya Rupesh, Gowri S, Prijith, Aditya Ajay, Chinmayi Kiranbal	5:32
2.	"Kalan Puli"	Vinayak Sasikumar	Amal Jose, Sushin Shyam	3:17
3.	"Kannur Squad Theme"		Sushin Shyam	1:54
Total length:				10:03

== Release ==
=== Theatrical ===
Kannur Squad was censored with a U/A certificate by the Censor Board prior to its release. The film was released in theatres on 28 September 2023. It was distributed in Kerala by Wayfarer Films and the overseas distribution was done by Truth Global Films. It was screened in more than 130 theatres in GCC countries. The film was released in 160 theatres in Kerala on the first day and was screened in over 250 theatres on the second day. The film was screened on over 330 screens on the third day. The film was released in New Zealand and Australia on 6 October 2023. The film expanded its release with additional screenings in European countries including the United Kingdom and Ireland and in the United States, Canada and Singapore.

=== Home media ===
Disney+ Hotstar and Asianet had acquired the satellite and post-theatrical digital distribution rights. The film began streaming it from 17 November 2023 and will be streamed in Hindi, Tamil, Telugu and Kannada languages. The film will also have a delayed OTT release post-pandemic. It was complied with the Kerala Theatre Owners Association's long standing demand for an extended cinema run.

== Reception ==
Kannur Squad received critical acclaim from critics.

=== Critical response ===
Sanjith Sidhardhan of OTTPlay gave 4/5 stars and wrote "All departments fire in equal measure in making Mammootty's police procedural a gripping theatrical watch. Kannur Squad also serves as a reminder of the challenges faced by duty-bound police officers, while keeping the audience hooked to the engaging narrative as a team of four cops chase four elusive criminals across the country." Sajin Shrijith of The New Indian Express gave 3.5/5 stars and wrote "The most stimulating aspect of the script is how it explores the manner in which its characters handle strong emotions." Sarath Ramesh Kuniyl of The Week gave 3.5/5 stars and wrote "Kannur Squad is mind-boggling. It is through such films a layman understands the struggles of the police to crack a case. Not every mission is a success, but they have to stay firm."

Anna Mathews of The Times of India gave 3/5 stars and wrote "On the downside, there are some gory moments that could have been avoided. Muhammed Rahil's cinematography is excellent; wonderfully capturing dramatic moments in small spaces and the grandeur of landscapes. For this alone, the film is worth catching in cinemas." Anandu Suresh of The Indian Express gave 3/5 stars and wrote "Roby Varghese Raj's Kannur Squad, starring Mammootty in the lead role, is undoubtedly a solid police procedural that unfolds at a measured tempo, avoiding excessive dramatisation. However, its notable resemblances to earlier films within the same genre prevent it from being truly fresh." Cris of The News Minute gave 3/5 stars and wrote "Roby Varghese Raj, the director, gives a few cinematic strokes, minimal and essential to the real story of a police squad in Kerala, played by Mammootty and his team of three men."

S. R. Praveen of The Hindu wrote "Despite letting Mammootty indulge in a bit of fan service, director Roby Varghese Raj ensures that the film sticks to the police procedural sans any glamour for the most part." Princy Alexander of Onmanorama wrote "Despite no major twists, the performances of all the actors and the action-oriented sequences in the second half of the movie, make 'Kannur Squad' engaging." Vishal Menon of Film Companion wrote "When aided by a strong support cast and one seriously menacing villain, Kannur Squad develops into a meticulously detailed procedural that is clever enough to go all guns blazing for its superstar when needed."

=== Box office ===
Kannur Squad earned ₹28−32 crore worldwide in its first four weekend. On its seventh day, the film grossed ₹45.4 crore worldwide with ₹21.90 crore from Kerala, ₹3.10 crore from Rest of India and ₹20.40 crore from overseas. On its ninth day, it grossed over ₹50 crore worldwide becoming the sixth fastest Malayalam film to reach the mark. As of October 9, 2023, the film collected ₹1 crore from Kochi multiplexes and ₹55.47 lakhs from Aries Plex Theatre, Thiruvananthapuram.

On its eleventh day, the film grossed over ₹65 crore worldwide. On its 12th day, the film collected ₹1.71 crore from North America and grossed over ₹29 crore from the overseas market. Grossing ₹32.72 crore from Kerala, the worldwide gross was ₹67.35 crore in 12 days. It earned ₹70 crore worldwide by collecting ₹33.50 crore from Kerala within its 15 days of release.

The film grossed ₹75 crore in the worldwide box office collection after 18 days of its release by collecting ₹42.50 crore domestically. As of October 17, 2023 it grossed over US$3.893 million (₹32.40 crore) from overseas with US$3.152 million from the UAE, GCC, US$316K from the European market, US$270K from North America, US$105K from New Zealand and Australia. The film grossed ₹80 crore in 25 days of its release. The film collected £204,523 from the United Kingdom and Ireland.

On its theatrical run, the film has collected ₹2.40 crore from the Kochi multiplexes. The film ran over 50 days in theatres collecting ₹42 crore from Kerala ₹5.75 crore from other regions of India, ₹53 crore from overseas reaching its gross ₹100 crore from the worldwide box office, becoming one of the highest-grossing Malayalam films of all time.
