= Roby Varghese Raj =

Indian cinematographer

- Born: Thrissur, Kerala, India
- Education: Dr. G.R. Damodaran College of Science, Coimbatore; Mindscreen Film Institute, Chennai
- Occupations: Film director; cinematographer
- Years active: 2010–present
- Spouse: Anju Mary
- Parent: C. T. Rajan
- Relatives: Rony David Raj (brother)

Roby Varghese Raj is an Indian cinematographer and director who works in the Malayalam cinema. He debuted in A. K. Sajan’s Puthiya Niyamam.

== Early life ==
Roby was born in Thrissur, Kerala to former film producer C. T. Rajan. He graduated from Dr G R Damodaran College of Science. His elder brother Rony David Raj is an actor in the Malayalam film industry.

== Personal life ==
He is married to Dr. Anju Mary.

== Career ==
Roby started working as an assistant cinematographer with Rubaiyz Mohammed and Himman Dhammija in 2010 at Mumbai and then moved to Kochi to assist Jomon T. John and Loganathan Srinivasan in 2012. He studied cinematography at Mindscreen Film Institute, Chennai under Rajiv Menon.

He made his directorial debut with Kannur Squad (2023), which was co-written by his brother Rony David Raj.

== Filmography ==
=== As cinematographer ===
Year	Film	Director	Notes
2016	Puthiya Niyamam	A. K. Sajan	
2017	The Great Father	Haneef Adeni	
2018	Captain	Prajesh Sen	
2018	Thattumpurath Achuthan	Lal Jose	
2019	Love Action Drama	Dhyan Sreenivasan	
2021	Vellam	Prajesh Sen	
2022	Eesho	Nadirshah	
2022	John Luther	Abhijith Joseph	
2025	Officer on Duty	Jithu Ashraf	
2026	Pradhama Drishtiya Kuttakkar	Shahad Nilambur	
2026	Hail Mary †	Vishnu Revikumar	

=== As director ===
Year	Film	Writer(s)	Notes
2023	Kannur Squad	Rony David Raj, Muhammed Shafi	

=== As second unit cinematographer ===
Year	Film	Director	DOP
2015	Nee-Na	Lal Jose	Jomon T. John
2015	Charlie	Martin Prakkat	Jomon T. John
2016	Action Hero Biju	Abrid Shine	Alex J. Pulickal

== Accolades ==
Year	Award	Category	Film	Result	Ref
2024	Mazhavil Entertainment Awards	The Entertainer of the Year- Debut	Kannur Squad	Won	
