= Nalla Nilavulla Rathri =

2023 Indian film by Murphy Devasy

- Theatrical release poster
- Directed by: Murphy Devasy
- Written by: Murphy Devasy; Praful Suresh
- Produced by: Sandra Thomas; Wilson Thomas
- Starring: Chemban Vinod Jose; Baburaj; Sai Kumar; Binu Pappu; Jinu Joseph; Ganapathi S. Poduval; Rony David Raj; Sajin Cherukayil
- Cinematography: Ajay David Kachappilly
- Edited by: Shyam Sasidharan
- Music by: Kailas Menon
- Production companies: Sandra Thomas Productions; Million Dreams
- Distributed by: Goodwill Entertainments
- Release date: 30 June 2023
- Running time: 126 minutes
- Country: India
- Language: Malayalam

Nalla Nilavulla Rathri (transl. A fine moonlit night) is a 2023 Indian Malayalam-language slasher horror film directed by Murphy Devasy in his directorial debut. The film stars Chemban Vinod Jose, Baburaj, Sai Kumar, Binu Pappu, Jinu Joseph, Ganapathi S. Poduval, Rony David Raj, Sajin Cherukayil, and Nithin George. The film follows a group of friends who arrive in Shimoga as part of a business trip and the unforeseen incidents that occur there.

The film was officially announced in September 2022 and principal photography began in the same month in Kanthalloor. Kuttikkanam was another main filming location. The music was composed by Kailas Menon, while the cinematography and editing were handled by Ajay David Kachappilly and Shyam Sasidharan. The film is the first slasher film in Malayalam cinema.

Nalla Nilavulla Rathri was released in theatres on 30 June 2023 to mixed reviews from critics.

== Plot ==
Dominic, Joshi, Peter, and Rajeevan are friends who run an organic farm in Kanthalloor. Dominic and Joshi are in charge of sales, while Peter and Rajeevan are in charge of production. They sell their produce to Achayan, a wealthy business person. Although Peter and Rajeevan began the farm, it became more profitable once Joshi and Dominic joined as partners. However, Peter is unhappy about Dominic's profit-driven business.

Meanwhile, Kurien, an operating manager at Siemens in Abu Dhabi, borrows a large sum from Achayan and struggles to pay the interest. Kurien travels to Marayur with his aunt's son, Paul Joseph, a tourism consultant, and meets Achayan. He learns that Achayan plans to construct a new shopping complex on the land he pledged and assures to repay the money within the agreement's expiration date. Kurien meets Joshi and Dominic, his college juniors, at Achayan's house and goes to their farm with Paul.

Kurien meets Peter and Rajeevan, who are also his college mates, at the farm. He learns that Achayan is the one who purchases all of their farm's produce. Peter expresses his interest in finding a good buyer, as they were fed up with doing business with Achayan, who did not pay them on time. Through Paul, Kurien arranges an agreement between his friends and a supermarket company to sell their produce. Kurien tells his friends about the need to improve and expand their business. He tells them to purchase a 266-acre plot of land with a bungalow in Shimoga, which is in his care.

Peter tells about the risks of doing business in a faraway location, but Dominic decides to visit the property. Dominic learns from Achayan that the property belongs to Kurien and is now pledged to Achayan. Peter and Rajeevan decide to travel to Shimoga with Kurien, Dominic, and Joshi to thwart the deal. Joshi arranges for a driver named Aneesh for the journey. Irumban, a notorious person who is Dominic's and Joshi's friend, arrives at the bungalow in Shimoga on their call. Kurien is annoyed by the arrival of Irumban, as he has had issues with him in the past.

While everyone plays a card game at night, Paul informs them that Rajeevan is lying dead outside. After a while, Paul goes missing, and Dominic suspects that it is all part of Kurien and Paul's plan to trap them. Everyone comes out of the bungalow to escape and finds Paul lying dead near the vehicle. Kurien suspects someone has come to target one of them for unknown reasons. When Dominic reveals Kurien's plan to dump the property on them, they get into a fight. Irumban suspects Aneesh and attacks him for carrying a knife.

Dominic loses an arm in a sudden bomb explosion, and one of the hunter gang members kills him. Irumban tells Kurien that the gang came looking for him after he killed one of their members. Kurien tells Irumban about a secret underground tunnel through which they can escape. Irumban escapes through it, whereas Kurien is severely attacked by the gang's hunting dog.

Joshi kills a gang member by pouring acid on him. Joshi, Peter, and Aneesh escape together, and Aneesh kills the dog when it chases and attacks Peter. Irumban fights the people chasing him and manages to escape from them. The next morning, Peter, Joshi, and Aneesh get into a jeep off the road, and Irumban joins them on the way. Aneesh notices the same belt inside the Jeep that was found around the dog's neck. As he asks the driver about where they are going, the driver suddenly stops the jeep and pulls out a gun.

== Cast ==
- Chemban Vinod Jose as Irumban
- Baburaj as Kurien
- Sai Kumar as Achayan
- Binu Pappu as Joshi
- Jinu Joseph as Dominic
- Ganapathi S. Poduval as Aneesh
- Rony David Raj as Peter
- Sajin Cherukayil as Paul Joseph
- Harish Uthaman as Devappa (Cameo)
- Nithin George as Rajeevan
- Divya M. Nair as Sherly, Kurien's wife
- Shravan Satya as head of the hunting gang

== Production ==
=== Development ===
Sandra Thomas, who was previously a partner of the Friday Film House, started her own production company, Sandra Thomas Productions, in 2020. Nalla Nilavulla Rathri is the first film from Sandra Thomas Productions. The film was officially announced in September 2022. The script is written by Murphy Devasy, while the screenplay and dialogue are co-written by Murphy Devasy and Praful Suresh. It is jointly produced by Sandra Thomas and her husband, Wilson Thomas, under the banner of Sandra Thomas Productions.

=== Filming ===
On 12 September 2022, the principal photography commenced with a pooja ceremony at Vrindavan Gardens in Kanthalloor. The title poster of the film was released on 2 November 2022. The first schedule was completed in Kuttikkanam on 4 November 2022.

== Marketing ==
The film's first-look poster and motion poster were released in April 2023. The official trailer was launched on YouTube on 5 May 2023. The second-look poster was released on 4 June 2023, featuring Chemban Vinod Jose, Baburaj, Jinu Joseph, Binu Pappu, and Ganapathi.

== Soundtrack ==
Nalla Nilavulla Rathri

Soundtrack album by Kailas Menon
- Released: March 22, 2023
- Venue: Kochi
- Studios: K7 Studios; K-Space
- Genre: Feature film soundtrack
- Length: 3:56
- Language: Malayalam
- Label: Goodwill Entertainments
- Producers: Praveen Ninan; Kailas Menon

Kailas Menon chronology
Flush (2023)	Nalla Nilavulla Rathri (2023)	Jaladhara Pumpset Since 1962 (2023)
External audio
- Audio on Spotify
- Audio on YouTube

Kailas Menon composed the film's soundtrack. Murphy Devasy and Praful Suresh wrote the lyrics for the film's only song "Thaanaro Thannaro". It was released on YouTube on 22 March 2023.

Track listing
No.	Title	Singer(s)	Length
1.	"Thaanaro Thannaro"	Rajesh Thamburu, Baburaj, Rony David, Jinu Joseph, Sajin, Nithin George, Ganapathi, Kailas Menon	3:56

== Release ==
=== Theatrical ===
Nalla Nilavulla Rathri was released in theatres on 30 June 2023.

=== Home media ===
Amazon Prime Video acquired the digital rights and began streaming it on 30 August 2023. The satellite rights of the film is acquired by Amrita TV and will premiere on the occasion of Onam 2025.

== Reception ==
=== Box office ===
The film earned $16,389 in the United Arab Emirates.

=== Critical response ===
Nalla Nilavulla Rathri received mixed reviews from critics.

Gopika ls of The Times of India gave 3 out of 5 stars and wrote, "Murphy Devasy's debut Nalla Nilavulla Rathri is a watchable movie with some moments of brilliance sprinkled all over. After an interesting build up in first half, the second half was a rollercoaster, which fizzled down towards the end." Raymond John Kuriachan of OTTPlay gave 3 out of 5 stars and wrote, "Nalla Nilavulla Rathri has a promising start, but the script lacks the necessary depth in the second half to maintain the character development from the first half. While there are some gripping moments in the second half, it fails to entertain most of the time."

Arjun Ramachandran of The South First gave 2.5 out of 5 stars and wrote, "Nalla Nilavulla Raathri is a thriller that loses its pace at a point but manages to entertain the audience with its technical aspects." Anandu Suresh of The Indian Express gave 0.5 out of 5 stars and wrote, "Nalla Nilavulla Rathri can be seen as a slasher film; however, the only thing it truly slashes is the viewers' bank balances, particularly when the month-end is here."

S. R. Praveen of The Hindu wrote, "The character building and context setting by Murphy Devassy in the first half is wasted as the movie pivots to become a slasher-home invasion thriller." Princy Alexander of Onmanorama wrote, "Had makers toned down the violence and focused more on creating a convincing narrative, Nala Nilavulla Rathri would have been a better watch."
