= Mikhael (film) =

2019 Malayalam film directed by Haneef Adeni

- Theatrical release poster
- Directed by: Haneef Adeni
- Written by: Haneef Adeni
- Produced by: Anto Joseph
- Starring: Nivin Pauly; Unni Mukundan
- Cinematography: Vishnu Panicker
- Edited by: Mahesh Narayanan
- Music by: Gopi Sundar
- Production company: Anto Joseph Film Company
- Distributed by: Anto Joseph Film Company
- Release date: 18 January 2019
- Running time: 150 minutes
- Country: India
- Language: Malayalam

Mikhael (also known as Mikhael: The Guardian Angel) is a 2019 Indian Malayalam-language action thriller film directed by Haneef Adeni and produced by Anto Joseph. It is the first installment to the Mikhael Extended Universe, starring Nivin Pauly in the titular role, alongside Unni Mukundan, Manjima Mohan, Siddique, JD Chakravarthy, Suraj Venjaramoodu, K.P.A.C Lalitha, Ashokan, Jayaprakash, Sudev Nair, Kalabhavan Shajohn, Sijoy Varghese, Babu Antony, Sashi Kumar Subramony and Baiju Santhosh. The music was composed by Gopi Sundar, while the cinematography and editing were handled by Vishnu Panicker and Mahesh Narayanan.

Mikhael was released on 18 January 2019. The film received mixed reviews from critics and became an "average grosser" at the box office. A spin-off titled Marco was released on 20 December 2024, which became a massive commercial success.

== Plot ==
George D'Peter aka Adattu George, an influential gold smuggler in Kerala from the famous Adattu family, and his driver are killed under mysterious circumstances. ACP Muhammed Easa and CI Isaac John begin the investigation and discover that the murders were carried out with a surgical blade, deduce that a doctor committed them and start investigating medical stores. At the same time, George's cold-blooded younger brother, Marco D'Peter "Marco Jr." meets George's partners, William Davis, and his elder son, Abraham Davis, to ask whether it was their work. When Abraham speaks in a disgusting manner, an agitated Marco shoots him to death. During his funeral, Easa asks William and his younger son, Francy Davis, about Abraham's murder, but they do not reveal anything.

One night, a mysterious person shoots Patrick, Davis's secretary. Easa and Isaac take him to Star Hospital, where he is murdered despite being protected with maximum security. This solidifies the theories of Easa and Isaac that the killer is a doctor and the gangs start believing that someone is after them. Isaac becomes suspicious of Easa since he revealed that he had an informant, but did not reveal anything about him. Isaac investigates on his own, discovering that Dr. Mikhael John, a young surgeon of Star Hospital is the killer and Easa's informant. Issac also finds that Easa is helping Mikhael since they have contacted each other several times. Issac forces Easa to reveal everything to prevent Mikhael's arrest, where Easa reveals Mikhael's past.

Past: A ten-year-old Mikhael persuades his father John, a martial arts trainer, to let him drive his car, which results in John's death. Mikhael's mother, Ancy, blames him for his father's death, resulting in Mikhael separating from Ancy. Meanwhile, George's son, Gerald D'Peter, challenged Jenny, Mikhael's younger sister, to a kung-fu fight in front of the school. Jenny defeats him, causing his friends and other students to tease him for losing to a girl. Depressed over the matter, Gerald commits suicide by jumping from the school terrace. George visits Jenny and asks her to jump from the school terrace in the same way Gerald had jumped or he will kill her entire family.

George continuously disturbs and harasses Jenny, who decides to jump off the school terrace. Before Jenny jumps off the school terrace, Mikhael saves her. After learning about the harassment, Mikhael files a complaint to the police, but the SI warns him as they are allied with George. Ancy asks him to visit them on Christmas, but Mikhael refuses. George later kills Ancy in a car accident, causing Mikhael to burn his Audi Q7 car. George and his henchmen capture Mikhael and thrash him brutally, leaving him on a railroad track to his death. Mikhael manages to escape and eventually catches up to George and his driver, killing them.

Present: Marco learns about Mikhael and Jenny and vows to finish them. Easa also reveals that he ordered Mikhael to kill Patrick since he was a common connection between the gangs and killing him will provoke a gang war. Meanwhile, William and Francy kidnap Jenny as they learnt about Mikhael's involvement in Patrick's death, but he manages to save Jenny. William and Francy are arrested by Easa, who also arrests Marco for killing Abraham. However, Marco gets released on bail, where he kidnaps Jenny and takes her to the helipad of a skyscraper and challenges Mikhael to a hand-to-hand combat. Michael arrives at the helipad and fights with Marco. Using a hidden surgical blade in his pocket, Mikhael severely injures Marco and signs him up for organ donation, finally walking away with Jenny.

== Cast ==
- Nivin Pauly as Dr. Michael John
  - Gowri Shankar as Young Michael
- Unni Mukundan as Marco D'Peter aka "Marco Jr."
- Siddique as George D'Peter aka "Adattu George", Marco's elder brother and head of the Adattu Family
- Navani Devanand as Jennifer John / Jenny, Michael's sister
- J. D. Chakravarthy as ACP Muhammad Easa IPS
- Suraj Venjaramoodu as CI Isaac John
- Manjima Mohan as Dr. Mary, Michael's love interest and colleague
- V. Jayaprakash as William "Davichayan" Davis
- Sudev Nair as Francy Davis, William's younger son
- Ashokan as Antony, Michael and Jenny's stepfather
- Shanthi Krishna as Ancy, Michael and Jenny's mother
- K. P. A. C. Lalitha as Adattu Mariam aka "Mariyamma", George and Marco's mother
- Baiju Santhosh as Dr. James Cheriyan
- Vishnu Premkumar as CI Philip Kora
- Kalabhavan Shajohn as Patrick, William's right-handman
- Babu Antony as John, Michael and Jenny's father
- Sashikumar Subramani as George's contract killer
- Kishore as ACP N. Sreenivasan IPS
- Sijoy Varghese as Abraham, William's elder Son
- Reba Monica John as Anna, Mikhael's ex-girlfriend (cameo)
- V. K. Prakash as Psychiatrist Charles Tharakan
- Balaji Sarma as Karate instructor
- Amal Shah as Gerald Peter, George's son and Marco's nephew
- Shaji Shahid as Anwar, Marco's deputy (uncredited appearance)
- Govind Krishna as Medical College Senior
- Nitha Promy as School Teacher

== Production ==
Mikhael is the second directorial venture of Haneef Adeni after The Great Father, with Anto Joseph produced the film under Anto Joseph Film Company. The film was announced on 12 July 2018. The pooja function was held in Kochi on 3 September 2018.

Principal photography ended on November 26, 2018.

== Music ==
The film features songs composed by Gopi Sundar.

== Reception ==
=== Critical response ===
Sajin Shrijith of Cinema Express gave 4/5 stars and termed Mikhael as "tightly paced, testosterone-fueled entertainment." Renukha Padmanabhan of The Week gave 3/5 stars and wrote "The narrative takes recourse to frequent flashbacks, but the director makes sure that the audience do not lose track of the happenings as he switches between the past and the present. Gopi Sundar's background score fits well into the proceedings; however, there isn't much novelty and you are left with a sense of deja vu while listening to the score."

Deepa Soman of The Times of India gave 2.5/5 stars and wrote "By the first half itself, the reasons for the events yet to unfold are almost clear and those waiting to be revealed post intermission hardly evoke any thrill as they arrive. The long second half is all about waiting to see what all the hero gets to do to the villains, to punish them." Behindwoods gave 2.5/5 stars and wrote "Mikhael is the kind of film which will entertain you if you do not expect everything to be logical. To enjoy the movie to the fullest you should let the film go in whichever direction it feels like going, and not think too much about anything."

Sowmya Rajendran from The News Minute wrote that "Even if you watch the film knowing what to expect of Haneef Adeni, 'Mikhael' is disappointing." Manoj Kumar of The Indian Express gave 0.5/5 stars and wrote "Adeni could have named this film The Great Brother, instead of Mikhael" and also termed the film as a "migraine-inducing incoherent mess, which kills our desire to be entertained." Anna M. M. Vetticad of Firstpost rated the film 0.75 in a scale of 5 and wrote that "Nivin Pauly struggles through a pretentious, pompous affair ... the irritating music and pseudo-philosophical mumbo jumbo overshadow both the storyline and the usually reliable Nivin Pauly's natural charm".

Navamy Sudheesh of The Hindu called the film an average action fare, wrote that "while the film is engaging at some levels, it lacks that raw energy and intensity of a thorough thriller." Litty Simon of Malayala Manorama wrote "The slow-paced thriller won't really blow your mind, but it comes with enough masala for a Nivin Pauly movie." Calling the film "loud" and "confused", Neelima Menon from Huffington Post wrote that Nivin Pauly "is a thorough misfit" in the film. She was also heavily critical about the film's music.

Upon release, the makers of the film faced criticism from public and media outlets for allegedly attempting to suppress negative reviews on social media. Reports indicated that they requested Facebook to remove such posts, citing copyright issues. This effort reportedly also resulted in Facebook blocking two film-related groups.

== Accolades ==
Year	Award	Category	Recipient	Result	Notes
2020	22nd Asianet Film Awards	Youth Icon	Unni Mukundan	Won	along Mamangam

== Future ==
=== Spin-off ===
A standalone spin-off to the film titled Marco was released on 20 December 2024, with Unni Mukundan and Siddique reprising their roles from this film. Marco features Marco and George, the negative characters of Mikhael in the lead roles.

By September 2025, the director of both Mikhael and Marco had confirmed another prequel, which is titled as Lord Marco. The film will be about the ancestor of the character Marco D'Peter alias Marco Jr.

=== Shared universe ===
The film shares its universe directly with its spin-off Marco (2024) and Kattalan (2026). Kattalan, starring Antony Varghese, leads to an exploration on Marco's family, further connecting it to Mikhael.
