= Mazaiyil Nanaigiren =

2024 Tamil film by T Suresh Kumar

- Theatrical release poster
- Directed by: T Suresh Kumar
- Written by: Viji; Kavin Pandiyan; (dialogues)
- Screenplay by: T Suresh Kumar
- Story by: T Suresh Kumar
- Produced by: Sreevidhya Rajesh; B Rajesh Kumar
- Starring: Anson Paul; Reba Monica John
- Cinematography: J Kalyan
- Edited by: GB Venkatesh
- Music by: Vishnu Prasad
- Production company: Rajshree Ventures
- Release date: 27 December 2024
- Country: India
- Language: Tamil

Mazaiyil Nanaigiren (transl. I'm getting wet in the rain) is a 2024 Indian Tamil-language film written and directed by T Suresh Kumar with its dialogues being penned by Viji and Kavin Pandiyan. The film stars Anson Paul and Reba Monica John in the lead roles alongside Mathew Varghese, Anupama Kumar, Sankarguru Raja, Sujatha Panju, Vetrivel Raja, Kishore Kumar and others in supporting roles. The film is produced by Sreevidhya Rajesh and B. Rajesh Kumar under their Rajshree Ventures banner, while the technical crew consists of cinematographer J. Kalyan, editor GB Venkatesh, and music composer Vishnu Prasad.

Mazaiyil Nanaigiren was released in theatres on 27 December 2024.

== Plot ==
A wealthy Christian man pursues an ambitious Brahmin woman who initially rejects him to study in the U.S. His chance encounter with her sister leads the woman to reconsider and ultimately confess her love.

== Cast ==
- Anson Paul as Jeeva Sebastian
- Reba Monica John as Aishwarya
- Mathew Varghese
- Anupama Kumar
- Sankarguru Raja
- Sujatha Panju
- Vetrivel Raja
- Kishore Kumar

== Production ==
=== Development ===
On 24 November 2019, actor Vijay Sethupathi launched the first-look poster of Remo (2016) and 90 ML (2019) fame Anson Paul and Bigil (2019) fame Reba Monica John's upcoming film titled Mazayil Nanaigiren, written and directed by T. Suresh Kumar. The film consists of an ensemble cast including Mathew Varghese, Anupama Kumar, Sankarguru Raja, Sujatha Panju, Vetrivel Raja, Kishore Kumar and others in supporting roles. The film has dialogues penned by Viji and Kavin Pandiyan and produced by Sreevidhya Rajesh and B. Rajesh Kumar under their Rajshree Ventures banner, while the technical crew consists of cinematographer J. Kalyan, editor GB Venkatesh, and music composer Vishnu Prasad.

=== Filming ===
Principal photography predominantly took place in Chennai, with song portions being shot in Aravalli Hills and Puducherry and got wrapped in early September 2019. The film was in the dubbing stage during the launch event.

== Music ==
Mazaiyil Nananigiren

Soundtrack album by Vishnu Prasad
- Genre: Feature film soundtrack
- Length: 25:09
- Language: Tamil
- Label: Zee Music South
- Producer: Vishnu Prasad

Singles from Mazaiyil Nanaigiren
- 1. "Un Kadhal Paarvai" Released: 10 July 2024; 2. "Jolly Thaan Joli" Released: 5 December 2024; 3. "Naatkal Azhagai Maari Poguthey" Released: 9 December 2024

Mazaiyil Nanaigiren - Full Album
- Mazaiyil Nanaigiren - Full Album on YouTube

The soundtrack and background are scored by Vishnu Prasad. The first single "Un Kadhal Paarvai" released on 10 July 2024. The second video single "Jolly Thaan Joli" released on 5 December 2024. The third single "Naatkal Azhagai Maari Poguthey" was released on 9 December 2024.

All lyrics are written by Lalithanand.

Track listing
No.	Title	Singer(s)	Length
1.	"Jolly Thaan Joli"	Naresh Iyer	4:37
2.	"Naatkal Azhagai Maari Poguthey"	Shweta Mohan	4:20
3.	"Un Kadhal Paarvai"	Haricharan, Sreevidhya Rajesh	4:22
4.	"Kuraveetu Kozhi"	Gaana Balachander	2:59
5.	"Vettai Aadum Vizhigal"	Sreevidhya Rajesh, Vishnu Prasad	4:34
6.	"Kaalam Irukkum Varai"	K. S. Chithra, Vishnu Prasad	4:17
Total length:			25:09

== Release ==
=== Theatrical ===
Mazaiyil Nanaigiren was released in theatres on 27 December 2024. Initially, it was scheduled for 12 December 2024, but was postponed to the current date due to the Orange Alert issued to several districts in Tamil Nadu.

== Reception ==
=== Critical response ===
A critic of Dinamalar rated the film 2.5/5 stars, criticizing the routine story and the clichéd scenes, but praised the performances of the lead actors. Thinkal Menon of The Times of India gave 2/5 stars and wrote "Some of the scenes involving the lead actors that happen after a major conflict appear decent when compared to other sequences that are written and performed generically. The uninspiring writing is such that we seldom come across such enjoyable, slice-of-life moments in the film."
