= Kattalan =

2026 film by Paul George

- Theatrical Release Poster
- Directed by: Paul George
- Written by: Paul George; Joby Varghese; Jero Jacob
- Dialogues by: Unni R.
- Produced by: Shareef Muhammed
- Starring: Antony Varghese; Sunil; Kabir Duhan Singh; Jagadish; Dushara Vijayan
- Cinematography: Renadive; Additional Cinematography: Chandru Selvaraj; Sudeep Elamon
- Edited by: Shameer Muhammed
- Music by: Songs: B. Ajaneesh Loknath; Ravi Basrur; Score: Ravi Basrur
- Production company: Cubes Entertainments
- Distributed by: Cubes Entertainments (India); Phars Films (Overseas)
- Release date: 28 May 2026
- Running time: 120 minutes
- Country: India
- Language: Malayalam
- Budget: ₹50 crore
- Box office: ₹15 crore

Kattalan (transl. Forest dweller) is a 2026 Indian Malayalam-language action thriller film written and directed by Paul George (in his directorial debut) and produced by Shareef Muhammed under the banner of Cubes Entertainments. The film is a standalone spin-off and the third installment in the Mikhael Extended Universe, following Mikhael (2019) and Marco (2024) and stars Antony Varghese, Sunil, Kabir Duhan Singh, Jagadish, Dushara Vijayan and Hanan Shaah. In the film, two powerful crime bosses, Maari and Eddy, control rival ivory smuggling networks and are engaged in a bloody war for dominance, with law enforcement trying to bring both empires down. However, corruption and violence keep both empires alive. Antony, known as "Kattalan" (The Hunter), is introduced as a feared hunter who kills elephants for their tusks and works within this criminal ecosystem.

The music is composed by Ravi Basrur and B. Ajaneesh Loknath. A promo song too was composed by Nihal Sadiq which does not feature in the movie. with the background score composed by Ravi Basrur, cinematography by Renadive, and editing by Shameer Muhammed.

The film was officially announced on 2 March 2025. Principal photography took place from 28 September 2025 to 24 February 2026 in Thailand, Vagamon, Kollam, Colombo, Dhanushkodi, Tirunelveli and Rameswaram.

It was released on 28 May 2026 in the standard, Dolby Cinema, IMAX and EPIQ formats. The film received mixed to negative reviews from critics and grossed ₹15 crore on a budget of ₹50 crore, becoming a box-office bomb.

== Cast ==
- Antony Varghese as Antony (Note: In the film and its promotional materials, the actor is credited under his screen name, "Pepe", and his character for this film uses his real name.)
- Sunil as Maari
  - Raj Thirandasu as Young Maari
- Kabir Duhan Singh in a dual role as:
  - Eddy
    - Niranjan T Nithin as young Eddy
  - Joseph, Eddy's Father
- Jagadish as Ali
- Dushara Vijayan as Lucy
- Hanan Shaah as Malik
- Shon Joy as Mano
- Hipster as Alokah
- Anson Paul as Stanley
- Parth Tiwari as Roby
- Harishankar Narayanan as SP Nelson Nadar
- Sandeep Raj as Naadhu
- Shanood Ebrahim as Hakkim
- Shibin Raghav as Marudhu
- Shaji Shahid as MLA Ishwar
- Bibin Perumpilly as Eapen Mathew
- Vijay Jacob as Minister Ilavarasu
- Arun Sunny as Dr. Sanjay
- Ali Shifas as Aadhi
- Farry as Naveen
- Yadhu Krishna as Amir
- Deepu G Panicker as Raghav Chandra IAS
- Ajin John as SI Velraj
- Sabeer EH as Salim
- Binu Manambur as Kaiser
- Hari Namboothiri as Alex Tharakan
- Chandran as Ilankovan
- Prathapan KS as Aravindan
- Gilu Joseph as Ramla
- Ankitha Vinod as Rekha
- Indu Gopalakrishnan as Janaki
- Indira Kozhikode as Leelamma
- Vedhika Sreekumar as Sainu
- Vismaya Prasobh as Meenakshi
- Mohammad Nadal as Aju
- Freya Mariam as Aami
- Ayah Mariam as Anna
- Amaya Paru as Maaya
- Sumith Kammara as Vasu Annan

Cameo appearances

- Siddique as George D'Peter (Note: Siddique reprises his role from Marco and Mikhael.)
- Alphonse Puthren as Mendis, Alokah gang leader
- Lokesh Kanagaraj as Leo Cabral

== Production ==
=== Development ===
On 22 August 2025, the production of Kattalan began with a traditional pooja ceremony held at Chakkolas Pavilion in Kochi, Ernakulam. The event was attended by the film’s cast and crew, as well as members of the film industry.

=== Filming ===
The principal photography began on 28 September 2025 and wrapped on 24 February 2026. Majority of filming took place in Thailand and Kothamangalam. The film was shot entirely with Sony's VENICE 2 8K cameras.

=== Marketing ===
Antony Varghese plays the lead role in Kattalan. The marketing for the film began with the release of the first look poster on 11 October 2025. Further promotional activities and updates about the cast and production continued in the following months leading up to the scheduled release.

== Music ==
Kattalan

Soundtrack album by Ravi Basrur, B. Ajaneesh Loknath, Nihal Sadiq
- Released: 29 May 2026
- Recorded: 2025–2026
- Venue: Bangalore
- Studios: Abbs Studios; Ravi Basrur Music Studios
- Genre: Feature film soundtrack
- Length: 19:34
- Language: Malayalam
- Label: T-Series
- Producers: Ravi Basrur; B. Ajaneesh Loknath; Nihal Sadiq

Ravi Basrur chronology
Blast (2026)	Kattalan (2026)	Toxic (2026)

B. Ajaneesh Loknath chronology
Sarala Subbarao (2026)	Kill (2026)	Ananthan Kaadu (2026)

The songs featured in the film were composed by B. Ajaneesh Loknath and Ravi Basrur while the background score was composed by Ravi Basrur, under the label of T-Series. The first single "Majako Mallika" was released on 14 February 2026, which the original Malayalam version received an average response while the Telugu version became a hit. A promo song titled Hunter Anthem composed by Nihal Sadiq was also released though it is not included in the film.

=== Track listing ===
No.	Title	Lyrics	Music	Singer(s)	Length
1.	"Majako Mallika"	Vinayak Sasikumar	B. Ajaneesh Loknath	Anand Sreeraj, Bhadra	3:30
2.	"Jungle Beast Theme"	Instrumental	Ravi Basrur	Instrumental	1:50
3.	"Ocean Beast Theme"	Instrumental	Ravi Basrur	Instrumental	2:14
4.	"Wild Beast Theme"	Instrumental	Ravi Basrur	Instrumental	1:45
5.	"Hunter Anthem"	Suhail Koya, Vignesh Ramakrishna	Nihal Sadiq	Hanan Shaah, SVDP	4:24
6.	"Blood On Tusk"	Chethan Handattu	Ravi Basrur	Santhosh Venky, Rohith Sidappa, Siddharth Basrur, chorus	2:47
7.	"The Empty Eyes"	Rajeev Govindam	Ravi Basrur	Sayonara Philip	3:06
Total length:					19:34

=== Background Score ===
Kattalan

Film score by Ravi Basrur
- Released: 1 July 2026
- Recorded: 2025–2026
- Venue: Bangalore
- Studio: Ravi Basrur Music Studios
- Genre: film score
- Length: 45:39
- Language: Malayalam
- Label: T-Series
- Producer: Ravi Basrur

Ravi Basrur chronology
Blast (2026)	Kattalan (2026)	Toxic (2026)
External audio
- Kattalan (OST Full Album) on YouTube

Kattalan Ost
No.	Title	Length
1.	"Aanakkolli"	4:13
2.	"Antony"	2:56
3.	"Benjamin"	1:10
4.	"Come in Hot"	1:18
5.	"Deoy"	2:45
6.	"Eddy"	2:31
7.	"Getting Caught"	2:05
8.	"Hunt Break"	3:21
9.	"Innocense Shattered"	1:49
10.	"Ivory Blast"	3:00
11.	"Jaffana"	4:20
12.	"Leo Cabral"	1:40
13.	"Lord Marco"	0:55
14.	"Maari Join Hands with Eddy"	1:46
15.	"Maari"	6:16
16.	"Massacre"	2:43
17.	"Revenge"	1:08
18.	"Thunhiriya"	1:43
Total length:		45:39

== Release ==
Kattalan was released on 28 May 2026 in its original Malayalam language alongside versions in the Tamil, Telugu, Kannada and Hindi languages in the standard, Dolby Cinema, IMAX, and EPIQ formats.

=== Home Media ===
The film’s post-theatrical streaming rights have been acquired by manoramaMAX. The film premiered on ManoramaMAX on August 13.
