= Rony David =

Indian actor

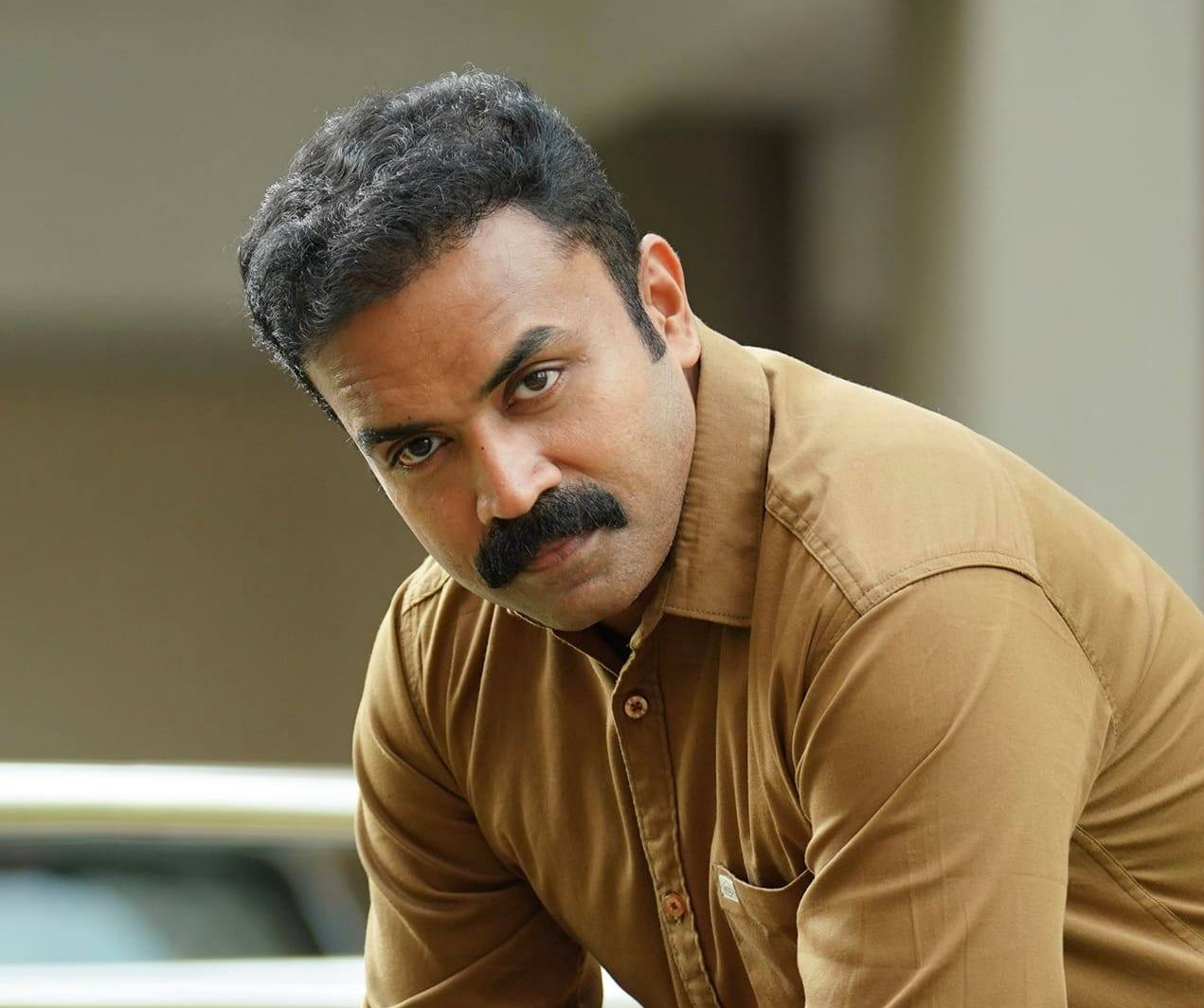
- Born: Rony David Raj; Thrissur, Kerala, India
- Education: Vinayaka Mission's Medical College, Karaikal (B.M.B.S)
- Occupations: Actor; physician; screenwriter
- Years active: 2006–present
- Known for: Aanandam (2016); Kannur Squad (2023)
- Spouse: Anju
- Children: 2
- Relatives: Roby Varghese Raj (brother); C. T. Rajan (father)

Rony David Raj is an Indian actor and former physician who works in Malayalam films.

== Personal life ==
Rony David Raj was born in Thrissur, Kerala. He is the son of film producer C. T. Rajan. He graduated with a Bachelors of Medicine & Surgery from Vinayaka Mission's Medical College in Karaikal and practiced as a physician at the KIMS Hospital in Thiruvananthapuram. He is the brother of director and cinematographer, Roby Varghese Raj.

== Filmography ==
=== Films ===
Year	Title	Role	Notes
2006	Pachakuthira		
2007	Chotta Mumbai	Shaji	
2007	Chocolate	Sunil Abraham	
2008	Kurukshethra	Naik Sasi	
2009	Chattambinadu		
2009	Duplicate	Vijay	
2009	Daddy Cool	Eeshwar	
2010	Body Guard	Chandran	
2010	Aagathan	Akbar Ali	
2010	Best Actor		
2010	Sakudumbam Shyamala	Arun	
2010	Apoorvaragam	Mithun Alias	
2011	Traffic	Journalist	
2012	Asuravithu	Danny	
2012	Ayalum Njanum Thammil	Tony Varghese IPS	
2012	Karmayodha	City Police Commissioner	
2012	Chettayees		
2012	916	Lekshmi's brother	
2012	Grandmaster	Adarsh	
2013	Lisammayude Veedu	CITU Worker	
2013	Oru Indian Pranayakadha	Police officer	
2014	Samsaaram Aarogyathinu Haanikaram	Arguing husband	Bilingual film; shot in Malayalam and Tamil
2014	Vaayai Moodi Pesavum	Arguing husband	Bilingual film; shot in Malayalam and Tamil
2014	Polytechnic	Udayan	
2014	Karma Cartel	Dr. Roy	
2015	You Too Brutus	Music Director	
2015	Nirnayakam	Police Commissioner Arun George Varghese	
2016	Style	Stephen	
2016	Action Hero Biju	Constable Subair	
2016	Aanandam	Chacko Sir	Nominated Best Comedian in 2017 SIIMA Awards
2016	Karinkunnam 6'S	Felix	
2016	Kolumittayi		
2016	Vettah	ASP Rajeev	
2017	Take Off	Shaheed's friend	
2017	The Great Father	Franco	
2017	Thrissivaperoor Kliptham	Philip Kannadikkaran	
2017	Matchbox	Vijay Babu	
2018	Street Lights	SI Issac	
2018	Ankarajyathe Jimmanmar	Prakashan	
2018	Kamuki	James	
2018	Mangalyam Thanthunanena	George	
2019	Unda	Aji Peter	
2019	Helen	Shop Manager	
2019	Kettyolaanu Ente Malakha	Richard	
2020	Forensic	ACP Dano Mammen	
2020	Love	YouTuber Ajith Chacko	
2021	Operation Java	Shruthi's Husband	Photo presence only
2021	Nizhal	Rajan	
2021	Chathur Mukham	Naveen Joseph	
2021	Roy	SI Suresh	
2021	Kaanekkaane	Adv. Prasanth	Released on SonyLIV
2021	Michael's Coffee House	Michael	
2021	Sumesh and Ramesh		
2022	Sathyam Mathrame Bodhippikkoo	Manu	
2022	Karnan Napoleon Bhagath Singh	Manoj Poovambarampil	
2022	Aaraattu	Edathala Babu	
2022	Innale Vare	Jomy	
2022	Kallan D'Souza	Muhammad Iqbal	
2022	Vaashi	Jose	
2022	E. M. I	Alex	
2022	Roy	SI Suresh	
2023	2018	Cleetus	
2023	Nalla Nilavulla Rathri	Peter	
2023	Kannur Squad	CPO Jayakumar P. Vasu	Also screenwriter
2023	Pazhanjan Pranayam	Mohan	
2024	Partners	Vijay	
2024	Gumasthan	CI Hameed	
2024	Her	Satheesh	Released on ManoramaMAX
2025	Ariku		
2025	Detective Ujjwalan	SI Sachin	
2025	United Kingdom of Kerala		
2025	Nellikkampoyil Night Riders	Kuttappan	

=== Web series ===
Year	Title	Role	Platform	Notes
2026	Sathyameva †	TBA	ZEE5	

=== Short films ===
Year	Title	Role	Notes
2012	Oru Kutty Chodyam	Akku's father	
2015	Open Your Mind	Rahul	
2019	The Confession	Father	
2020	Priyappetta Sarammakk	Sir	Advertisement film for English Lakshya
2021	Raman Effect	The Husband	
2022	Night Saloon	Manaf	
2022	Indira	Rajiv Chandrabose	
