= Anson Paul =

Indian film actor

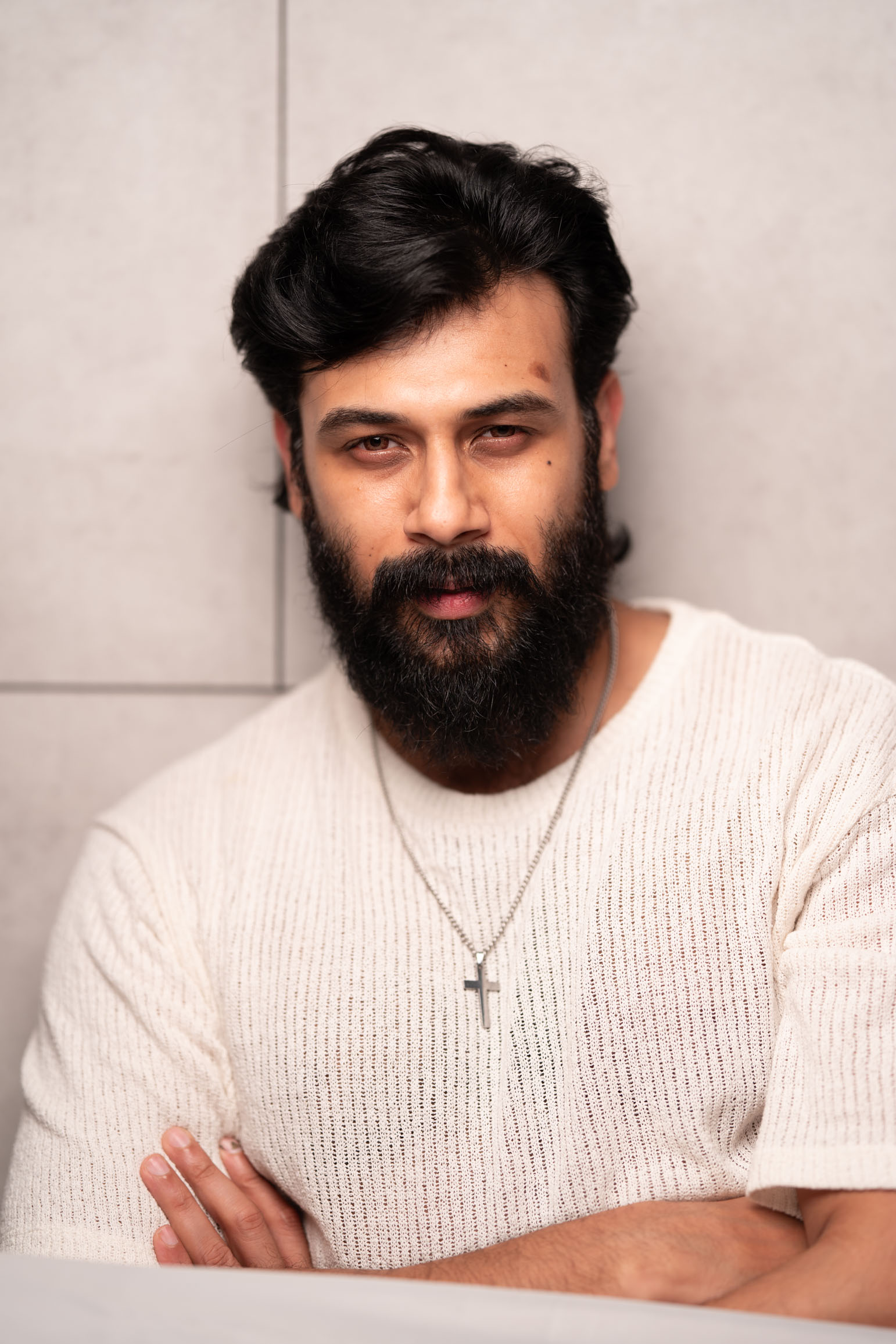
- Anson Paul in 2026
- Born: Chennai
- Occupation: Actor
- Years active: 2013–present
- Parent(s): Paulraj, Annie

Anson Paul is an Indian actor who has appeared in Malayalam Cinema along with a few Tamil language films. He made his acting debut in the 2013 Malayalam film KQ, along with Parvathy Omanakuttan, and was noticed in Su.. Su... Sudhi Vathmeekam and the Tamil movie Remo.

== Career ==
He played a major role in Abrahaminte Santhathikal (2018), along with Mammootty, where his role was reviewed as "fantastic performance, making him one of the promising actors" by the Times of India. He played the lead in The Gambler (2019), touted as the first superhero movie of the Malayalam film industry.

Paul is playing the lead along with Aditi Rao Hydari and Ketika Sharma in a Tamil-Telugu bilingual directed by Rajesh M. Selva.

== Filmography ==
Year	Title	Role	Language	Notes
2013	KQ	Roshen	Malayalam	
2015	Su.. Su... Sudhi Vathmeekam	Vijay Babu	Malayalam	
2016	Oozham	Edward Marquez	Malayalam	
2016	Remo	Dr. Vishwa	Tamil	
2017	Solo	Justin	Malayalam	
2017	Solo	Justin	Tamil	
2017	Aadu 2	Anali Sabu	Malayalam	
2018	Kala Viplavam Pranayam	Jayan	Malayalam	
2018	Abrahaminte Santhathikal	Philip Abraham	Malayalam	
2019	90ML	Venky	Tamil	
2019	The Gambler	Anson	Malayalam	
2019	Thambi	Karan	Tamil	
2023	Rahel Makan Kora	Kora	Malayalam	
2023	A Ranjith Cinema	Arjun	Malayalam	
2023	Thaal	Mithran	Malayalam	
2024	Bad Boyz		Malayalam	
2024	Marco	Devaraj	Malayalam	
2024	Mazaiyil Nanaigiren	Jeeva Sebastian	Tamil	
2026	Kattalan	Stanley	Malayalam	
