= Erachilpara Waterfalls =

Waterfalls in Kerala, India

- Location: Kanthalloor, Idukki district, Kerala, India

Erachilpara Waterfalls, also spelled as Irachilpara Waterfalls, is located in Idukki district in Kerala, India. They are the largest waterfalls in Munnar and is located very near to Kanthalloor.
