= Payagpur =

Area of Bahraich in Uttar Pradesh, India

Coordinates: 27°24′N 81°48′E

Payagpur is a block and tehsil in the Bahraich district of Uttar Pradesh.

Here is a pandawcarpet famous temple-named Bagheswarnath (Temple of God Shiva) and Baba Ram Prakash Temple, Mata Phoolamati Mata Temple also located in Tal Baghel region of Payagpur. Lale Miya Shrine is also situated in Talab Baghel region. Baghel Talab is a very large pond situated in Payagpur block of Bahraich district.

== Location ==
Tehsil Payagpur is part of the Bahraich district of Uttar Pradesh and has a railway station on the Gonda – Bahraich metre-gauge railway section.

== Constituency ==
Payagpur is a Vidhan Sabha constituency and comes under Kaiserganj Lok Sabha constituency. The present Member of Parliament is Karan Bhusan Singh (Bharatiya Janata Party) and Shubhash Tripathi (BJP).

== Education ==
Payagpur block has 152 primary schools (standard I to V), 51 middle schools (standard VI to VIII) and four senior secondary schools (standard IX to XII). The block also has one college named as Rajmata Lalli Kumari Mahavidyalaya that offers undergraduate programs and is host to the District Institute of Education and Training (DIET, Bahraich district).

== Health ==
Payagpur has one government hospital, i.e., community health center CHC located in the Kotbazar area and private hospitals.

== In popular culture ==
The place was featured in the 2023 Malayalam movie named Kannur Squad.
