= Balaji Sarma =

Indian film actor

- Born: Balaji Sarma
- Education: L.L.B
- Known for: Actor
- Notable work: Drishyam, The Great Father

Balaji Sarma is an Indian actor known for his work in Malayalam cinema and television. He gained recognition for his roles in Malayalam TV serials before transitioning to supporting characters in films.

== Early life and background ==
Balaji is the son of Harihara Sarma and Parvathy Ammal. At age 16, he joined the Indian Air Force, where he served for nine years. After his service, he earned a law degree before leaving his job to pursue acting full-time.

== Personal life ==
Balaji is married and has a daughter, Navomika.

== Career ==
Balaji began his career as a television anchor, hosting a comedy show on Asianet. He went on to act in several Malayalam television serials, including Alakal and Kayamkulam Kochunni.

In films, he appeared in a variety of supporting roles. His notable credits include Drishyam (2013), Ennu Ninte Moideen (2015), Pakida, Memories, Perariyathavar, The Great Father, and Oppam.

== Filmography ==
=== Films ===
Year	Title	Role	Notes
2012	Ozhimuri	mahout Murugan	
2013	Hotel California		
2013	Kunjananthante Kada		
2013	72 Model		
2013	Left Right Left	Hassan	
2013	Memories	Constable Somasekharan	
2013	Vedivazhipadu	Mobile Shopkeeper	
2013	Drishyam	Restaurant owner	
2014	Perariyathavar	District Collector	
2014	Medulla Oblangata		
2014	Avathaaram	Bhadran	
2014	Pakida	Xavier	
2014	1 by Two		
2014	Mr. Fraud	Shivaram	
2014	Avatharam	Police Officer	
2014	Oru Korean Padam	Freddy	
2015	Nirnayakam	Police Officer	
2015	Kanthari	Police Constable	
2015	Monsoon		
2015	Ennu Ninte Moideen	Mukkam Narayanan	
2015	Amar Akbar Anthony	Man in the Hospital	
2015	Kanal	Subash	
2015	Rajamma @ Yahoo	Police Officer	
2015	Adi Kapyare Kootamani	Electrician	
2016	Darvinte Parinamam	Police Constable	
2016	Shikhamani		
2016	Oru Murai Vanthu Parthaya	Kunjachan	
2016	Ghost Villa		
2016	Karinkunnam 6's	Satheesan	
2016	IDI: Inspector Dawood Ibrahim	DCB Bank Manager	
2016	Popcorn	Vasudevan	
2016	Oppam	SI Bhadran	
2016	Kavi Uddheshichathu..?	Benny	
2016	Ore Mukham	Exam Invigilator	
2017	Aby	School Teacher	
2017	Oru Mexican Aparatha	Sunil	
2017	The Great Father	Inspector Jose	
2017	1971: Beyond Borders	Sahadevan's friend	
2017	Lakshyam	Rajan	
2017	Sherlock Toms	Vinod	
2017	Lavakusha	Sajan Mathew	
2017	Villain	Mohan Nair	
2017	Telescope	Dalit Man	
2018	Kaly	Sijo	
2018	School Diary		
2018	Ankarajyathe Jimmanmar	Adv. James	
2018	Parole	Police officer	
2018	Panchavarnathatha	Jimmy’s assistant	
2018	Mohanlal	Police officer	
2018	Oru Kuttanadan Blog	Pambadi Vijayan	
2018	Chalakkudikkaran Changathi	Meenutty’s father	
2018	Nonsense	Manoj	
2018	Koodasha		
2018	Ranthal		Short film
2019	Mikhael	Karate Trainer	
2019	Ningal Camera Nireekshanathilaanu		
2019	Daivam Sakshi		
2019	Sachin	Prof. Balaji	
2019	Pattabhiraman	Rameshan	
2019	Sooryakantha		
2020	Uriyadi	News Reader Arvind Aasamyi	
2020	Forensic	Dr. Jayan Krishna	
2021	Sahyadriyile Chuvanna Pookkal		
2021	One	Chittar Gopalakrishnan MLA	
2021	Chathur Mukham	SI Zackaria	
2021	Anjam Vedam		
2021	Oru Thathvika Avalokanam	SI Thankachan	
2022	Karnan Napoleon Bhagath Singh		
2022	Kaduva	Deputy Prison Officer	
2022	Mathukuttiyude Vazhikal		
2022	King Fish	Janaki’s husband	
2022	Vivaha Avahanam		
2022	Prathi Niraparadhiyaano		
2023	Purusha Pretham	Police surgeon	
2023	Jawanum Mullapoovum	SI Salomon	
2023	Anuragam	Advocate	
2023	2018	Shaji’s colleague	
2023	Kurukkan	Vishwambharan	
2023	Sashiyum Sakunthalayum	Sundharan Panikkar	
2023	Garudan	Lecturer	
2024	Peppatty		
2024	Kurukku	DGP Ramdas	
2024	Njan Kandatha Sare		
2025	PDC Athra Cheriya Degree Alla		
2025	Apoorva Puthranmar		
2026	Varavu		
2026	Pradhama Drishtiya Kuttakkar	Crime Branch CI Sainudheen "Sainu"	

=== Television / Serial Credits ===
==== Malayalam ====
- Alakal
- Ammakili
- Kayamkulam Kochunni
- Moonnu Mani
- Mounaragam
- Manassinakkare
