= Marco (2024 film) =

2024 Indian film by Haneef Adeni

- Theatrical release poster
- Directed by: Haneef Adeni
- Written by: Haneef Adeni
- Produced by: Shareef Muhammed
- Starring: Unni Mukundan; Siddique; Jagadish; Kabir Duhan Singh; Abhimanyu Shammi Thilakan
- Cinematography: Chandru Selvaraj
- Edited by: Shameer Muhammed
- Music by: Ravi Basrur
- Production companies: Cubes Entertainments; Unni Mukundan Films
- Distributed by: Cubes Entertainments
- Release date: 20 December 2024
- Running time: 145 minutes
- Country: India
- Language: Malayalam
- Budget: ₹30 crore
- Box office: ₹110 crore

Marco is a 2024 Indian Malayalam-language action thriller film written and directed by Haneef Adeni and produced by Shareef Muhammed under his Cubes Entertainments banner. It is the second installment to the Mikhael Extended Universe, following Mikhael (2019), (Note: also a standalone spin-off to Mikhael) starring Unni Mukundan in the titular role alongside an ensemble cast, including Siddique, Jagadish, Kabir Duhan Singh, Abhimanyu Shammi Thilakan, Anson Paul, Ishaan Shoukath and Yukti Thareja. The film is considered as one of the most violent films in the history of Indian cinema, leading it to generate significant controversy.

The music was composed by Ravi Basrur, while cinematography and editing were handled by Chandru Selvaraj and Shameer Muhammed, respectively. Marco was released worldwide on 20 December 2024, coinciding with Christmas. The film received positive reviews from critics and was a commercial success at the box office emerging as the highest-grossing A-rated Malayalam-language film of all time and one of the highest-grossing Malayalam films of all time. A prequel is in development.

== Plot ==
Victor, a blind person, witnesses the murder of his close friend Wasim. Despite his blindness, Victor identifies the killer by recognising the distinct scent of the killer's perfume and the killer's vehicle, a Land Rover Defender. Victor's identification leads the cops to suspect that the killer is Russell, who conspired with Wasim's elder brother Tariq, to carry out the murder. Tragically, Victor gets captured by Russell, who throws him into a tub of hydrofluoric acid, resulting in his death. Victor's brother George Peter, the patriarch of the Adattu family, one of the prominent crime families in Kochi, is devastated by the loss. Marco Jr, Peter's adopted brother who had been sent to Italy for safety, returns to India after learning about Victor's death. At Victor's memorial service at their local church, Marco vows to avenge Victor's death, declaring his intent to eliminate everyone involved in the heinous act, including Russell, who is present at the scene. Despite Peter's attempts to dissuade him from taking a path of violence, Marco remains resolute.

Meanwhile, Tony Issac, Russell's father and the leader of the Isaac family, a gold smuggling syndicate, manipulates the situation to his advantage and strikes a deal with Peter involving gold biscuits and a ransom, all while plotting further treachery. During Peter's return from the deal, Tony's secretary Devraj ambushes him in his car, revealing the conspiracy and fatally stabbing him. Peter survives, but is hospitalised, further enraging Marco. Peter informs Marco that Tony and Russell were responsible for Victor's death. As Marco sets out for vengeance, Russell reveals his true nature by thrashing and severely injuring Marco and using a chainsaw to sever the left arm of Marco's right-hand man Anwar. An enraged Marco retaliates, bitting off Russell's deputy Jahangir's ear, killing Russell's goons and severely injuring them with the same chainsaw. While preparing to kill Russell, Marco learns that Victor's pregnant wife Isha, is being held captive by Tony. In exchange for her release, Tony demands the Adattu family's entire gold business operations to be transferred in his name.

Marco captures and tortures Dev using phosgene gas. He confesses that Isha is at Tony's guesthouse before dying in an explosion. Marco storms the guesthouse, slaughtering Tony's henchmen brutally to rescue Isha. However, Tony deceives Marco, revealing that Isha is locked in the trunk of Russell's car. Marco and Anwar track Tony down to his farmhouse, where Tony reveals that he is bisexual and attempts to seduce them but Marco cuts off Tony's right hand using a katana and sends it to Russell, disguised as a suitcase containing company documents. In an act of revenge, Marco puts Tony in a trap with acid, a gun and a bomb. Russell and his men manage to save Tony from the acid and the gun, but do not notice the bomb. One of Russell's men slides the front gate open, which triggers the bomb. Russell and his men rush out of the warehouse and watch helplessly, as tony blasts into pieces. Meanwhile, Peter kills Tariq by hanging him.

Desperate for revenge, Russell seeks help from his elder brother, Cyrus, who is a ruthless and psychotic butcher. They launch an attack on the Adattu mansion during Isha's labour, cut the power and begin to brutally slaughter the entire family. Despite Peter and Marco's valiant efforts, Cyrus and Russell kill all the members of the family, including the children, Anwar and Marco's wife Maria. Cyrus mercilessly cuts open Isha's stomach and extracts her newborn child before killing her and leaves with her newborn child while severely injuring Marco, Peter and mutilating Peter's wife. Gravely injured, Marco and Peter are left to mourn their family's deaths. Peter urges Marco to avenge not only Victor, but the entire family. Marco adopts a striking and fearsome appearance, wearing a suit and a special perfume which his brother had made for him and confronts Cyrus and Russell at their factory. Marco fights through their henchmen in a bloody showdown, where he kills Russell by ripping his rib cage using a crowbar and takes out his heart with his bare hand. In a climatic encounter with Cyrus, who holds the newborn child over a pool of acid, Marco decapitates him and rescues the child before pushing him into the acid. Marco completes his path of vengeance and leaves the factory with the child, while paying the ultimate price in the suffering and loss of his family.

In a post-credit scene, which takes place some time after the film's events, Marco spends time with Victor's child in a beach until a platoon of cars arrive and suddenly take the child away.

== Cast ==
- Unni Mukundan as Marco D'Peter "Marco Jr."
  - Arnav Prajith as young Marco
- Siddique as George D'Peter alias "Adattu George"
- Jagadish as Tony Isaac
- Kabir Duhan Singh as Cyrus Isaac
  - Nibras K.N. as young Cyrus
- Abhimanyu Shammi Thilakan as Russell Isaac
  - Vihan Shankar Raj as young Russell
- Anson Paul as Devaraj "Dev"
- Ishan Shoukath as Victor D'Peter
- Yukti Thareja as Maria Anna Paul "Mary"
- Durva Thaker as Isha Joshy
- Sreejith Ravi as Mathew Devassy
- Lishoy as Adattu Francis
- Mathew Varghese as Peter
- Shaji Shahid Jemshed as Anwar
- Ajit Koshy as Jahangir
- Dinesh Prabhakar as CI Ashok
- Arjun Nandhakumar as Tariq Rasool
- Bashid Basheer as Wasim Rasool
- Bindu Sanjeev as Elizabeth George
- Sajitha Sreejith as Ancy Mathew
- Bitto Davis as Roy Philip
- Sonia Giri as Tony's wife
- Arun Sunny as Ronymon
- Chithra Prasad as Chithra
- Saneesh Nambiar as SI Shahul Hameed
- Meera Nair as Sophie
- Nassar as DYSP Nambiar
- Raghu Chandran as City Police Commissioner
- Ramesh Menon as James
- Pravada Menon as Doctor
- Dr. Reji as Sebastian
- K. P. A. C. Lalitha as Mariyam D'Peter, Marco's foster mother and George's mother (photo presence)
- Riyaz Khan as CI Imran Malik (deleted scene)

== Production ==
=== Development ===
In October 2023, Cubes Entertainments announced Marco, with Unni Mukundan in the title role and Haneef Adeni serving as writer and director. Unni had previously portrayed a character named Marco in Mikhael (2019), in which the character appeared as the primary antagonist. The film is produced by Shareef Muhammed under the Cubes Entertainments banner.

The project was initially scheduled to begin production in February 2024, although filming was later postponed to April before the producers confirmed that principal photography would commence in the first week of May 2024. In March 2024, Ravi Basrur joined the production as the film's music composer. The technical crew also includes cinematographer Chandru Selvaraj, editor Shameer Muhammed, and action choreographer Kalai Kingson.

The producers announced that Marco would be released in Malayalam, with dubbed versions in Hindi, Tamil, Telugu, and Kannada.

=== Casting and filming ===
The film marked the Malayalam cinema debut of Abhimanyu, grandson of Thilakan and son of Shammi Thilakan. Siddique, Jagadish, and Kabir Duhan Singh were cast in supporting roles.

In May 2024, actress Yukti Thareja joined the cast, making her Malayalam film debut. Debutante Durva Thaker had joined the project earlier, while Riyaz Khan became part of the cast in July 2024.

The first schedule was held in May 2024 in Munnar. The second schedule was wrapped by July 2024 in Kochi. The principal photography was wrapped by 28 August 2024 after nearly 100 days of shooting.

== Music ==
Marco

Soundtrack album by Ravi Basrur
- Released: 21 December 2024
- Recorded: 2023–2024
- Genre: Feature film soundtrack
- Length: 25:57
- Language: Malayalam
- Label: Sony Music India

Official audio
- Marco (Jukebox) on YouTube

The film's music along with the background score was composed by Ravi Basrur. The music rights of the film were acquired by Sony Music. The first single, titled "Blood", was released on 22 November 2024. A second version of the song, sung by Santhosh Venky, was released on 25 November 2024 due to criticism of the first version from the audience. The second single titled "Marpapa" was released on 29 November 2024. The film's original soundtrack was released on 21 December 2024, while a separate album containing the film's background score was released by Sony Music India on 27 December 2024.

=== Track listing ===
| No. | Title | Lyrics | Music | Singer(s) | Length |
|---|---|---|---|---|---|
| 1. | "Blood" | Vinayak Sasikumar | Ravi Basrur | Dabzee, Rohith Siddappa, Santhosh Venky | 3:31 |
| 2. | "Marpapa" | Vinayak Sasikumar | Saeed Abbas | Baby Jean | 2:57 |
| 3. | "Asuran" | Vinayak Sasikumar | Ravi Basrur | Santhosh Venky | 3:08 |
| 4. | "Brother" | Vinayak Sasikumar | Ravi Basrur | Jithin Raj | 3:37 |
| 5. | "Family" | Anohnymouss, Fil$ | Shaan Rahman | Anohnymouss, Fil$ | 4:01 |
| 6. | "Blood" (Version 2) | Vinayak Sasikumar | Ravi Basrur | Santhosh Venky, Rohith Siddappa | 3:31 |
| 7. | "Marpapa" (Fast Version) | Vinayak Sasikumar | Saeed Abbas | Baby Jean | 2:24 |
| 8. | "Marco Theme 1" | Instrumental | Ravi Basrur | Santhosh Venky | 1:43 |
| 9. | "Marco Teaser Theme" | Instrumental | Ravi Basrur | Instrumental | 1:12 |
| Total length: | | | | | 25:57 |

=== Background score ===
Marco

Film score by Ravi Basrur
- Released: 27 December 2024
- Recorded: 2023–2024
- Genre: Film score
- Length: 1:24:50
- Language: Malayalam
- Label: Sony Music India
- Producer: Ravi Basrur

Marco(Original Background Score)
| No. | Title | Length |
|---|---|---|
| 1. | "The Blind and The Killer" | 1:08 |
| 2. | "Cabral 616" | 2:58 |
| 3. | "Tony Chemicals" | 1:41 |
| 4. | "Torso" | 1:49 |
| 5. | "Tony's Mayhem" | 1:19 |
| 6. | "Tony's Evil Way" | 1:30 |
| 7. | "Daredevil" | 1:06 |
| 8. | "Fighting Yard" | 1:33 |
| 9. | "Fight Club" | 0:17 |
| 10. | "George D'Peter" | 0:57 |
| 11. | "In The Woods" | 8:01 |
| 12. | "Russel's Plan" | 0:57 |
| 13. | "End of Victor" | 0:37 |
| 14. | "Marco in Fight Club" | 2:05 |
| 15. | "Wrong Wrong Person" | 1:24 |
| 16. | "The Epic Walk" | 2:42 |
| 17. | "First Phase of Marco" | 1:53 |
| 18. | "Marco's Katana" | 1:50 |
| 19. | "Russel at Funeral" | 0:24 |
| 20. | "Russel's Rampage" | 0:59 |
| 21. | "The Corridor Fight" | 2:15 |
| 22. | "The Massacre" | 9:39 |
| 23. | "Cyrus The Butcher" | 1:59 |
| 24. | "The Church Intro" | 2:41 |
| 25. | "Trap for Tony" | 3:11 |
| 26. | "The Gold Plan" | 2:01 |
| 27. | "This is My Deal" | 3:29 |
| 28. | "The Killer" | 3:01 |
| 29. | "The End is Here" | 4:41 |
| 30. | "The Staircase" | 2:43 |
| 31. | "Dev's Blood" | 1:05 |
| 32. | "Phosgene" | 0:53 |
| 33. | "The Last Ride" | 11:55 |
| Total length: | | 1:24:50 |

== Release ==
=== Theatrical ===
Marco was released on 20 December 2024, coinciding with the Christmas weekend. Apart from the original Malayalam language, it was released in the Telugu, Hindi, Tamil, and Kannada languages. The film received an A certification from the Central Board of Film Certification due to its extreme bloody violence. For the same reason, Marco became the first Indian action film and fifth Indian film in general to receive an R21 rating by the IMDA in Singapore. The film premiered at the Bucheon International Fantastic Film Festival in South Korea on 5 July 2025. It also premiered in Germany at the Fantasy Filmfest in September 2025.

=== Home media ===
The film was released on SonyLIV on 14 February 2025 in Malayalam along with dubbed versions in the Tamil, Telugu, and Kannada languages. The Hindi-dubbed version began streaming on Amazon Prime Video on 27 February 2025. Initially, an uncut version of the film was to be released on both streaming services, but after complaints were sent to the Ministry of Information and Broadcasting, the theatrical version got released on the platforms instead.

The film's French Blu-ray was released on 25 September 2025. The film was physically released in Germany on 15 January 2026 (initially scheduled for an 11 December 2025 release) on 4K Ultra HD, Blu-Ray, and DVD, alongside a limited and serialized 4K Ultra HD and Blu-Ray mediabook combo pack that includes a 24-page booklet and a removable cover. The mediabook release is sold in seven individual cover variants, with every single one being limited to 333 copies (except for the last one, which only has 222 copies). All the German physical media releases of the film have a German-language audio track and subtitles in addition to the film's original Malayalam-language audio track and English subtitles.

== Controversies ==
The film was subjected to attention and criticized by many personalities for its extreme violence and brutal content, saying that it influences real-life violence and involving violence against women and children. The film was planned to have a television premiere, but it was blocked by the CBFC due to the film's graphic violence. Alongside the cancellation of the film's planned TV premiere, appeals were also made by the regional censor board of India to remove the film from its OTT streaming services.

== Reception ==
=== Critical response ===
Sanjith Sridharan of OTTplay gave 3.5/5 stars and wrote "Marco is the closest Malayalam film to a Prashanth Neel movie, not in terms of scale or story, but style. Unni Mukundan's performance gets the lion's share of credit for this too." Janani K of India Today gave 3/5 stars for the Tamil version and wrote, "The film will blow your mind off with its action pieces and its not for the faint-hearted", concluding as "Actor Unni Mukundan's exceptional performance enhanced the feel of Marco". Reviewing the Telugu version, Pratyusha Sista of Telangana Today stated that, "the film is a must-watch for action lovers, if you're looking for a gripping weekend entertainer as the director takes a simple revenge story and crafts it into a top-notch thriller with his unique vision". Arun Antony of Deccan Herald gave 3/5 stars and wrote, "'Marco' has everything it claims to be: bloody, violent, brutal and it holds back little in terms of onscreen violence, however, the action and stunts are fresh and enjoyable". ABP Live gave 3.5/5 stars and wrote, "Technically the film sets a new standard in Indian cinema and it's a must-watch as the film maintains a thrilling pace with powerful action as well as brilliant direction". Aaliya Farzeen Ashraf of The Week gave 3/5 stars and wrote "Marco caters to fans of stylized action and intense violence." Shilpa Nair Anand of The Hindu wrote "The movie scores on the technical aspects such as the stylised stunts, cinematography and background score; the writing, however, flounders."

=== Box office ===
On its opening day, the film grossed ₹10.8 crore worldwide, being the fourth highest day-one grossing Malayalam film in 2024, and one of the highest opener in Malayalam cinema with ₹4.55 crore from the domestic market. Marco became the highest-grossing A certified film of Malayalam cinema, surpassing Kammatipaadam (2016). In its first three-day weekend, the film grossed over ₹30 crore worldwide with ₹14.75 crore from Kerala.

As of 3 January 2025, the Hindi dubbed version became the highest grossing Malayalam dubbed film in the Hindi speaking region netting ₹5 crore surpassing The Goat Life (2024) and 2018 (2023). The film crossed ₹100 crore globally on its 4th Sunday (23 days). As of 20 January 2025, the film grossed ₹104 crore worldwide.

== Sequel ==
The film's post-credits scene teased a sequel, which was confirmed by Haneef Adeni a few weeks after the release of the film, and it was expected to have more action and violence than its predecessor. However, in June 2025, Unni Mukundan himself claimed that the sequel was shelved due to "too much negativity" surrounding the first film.

In July 2025, Cubes Entertainments clarified that discussions regarding the sequel are still ongoing. The studio stated that they hold full rights to the project and have no plans to transfer or sell them. However, no official announcement has been made regarding the film's production or release.

In September 2025, the producers officially registered the title for a prequel film, which is titled Lord Marco with the Kerala Film Chamber of Commerce, confirming that plans for a follow-up film had been revived after earlier reports of shelving. Director Haneef Adeni, who helmed the original film, is confirmed to join the film, while lead actor Unni Mukundan has confirmed that he will not reprise the role. The film will be about the story of Lord Marco, who is the ancestor of the original film's protagonist, Marco D' Peter a.k.a Marco Jr. The prequel film will explore the events that took place before those films.

== Shared universe ==
The film shares its universe directly with the 2019 film Mikhael, serving as a standalone spin-off to it, and to Kattalan (2026) which is also part of the universe and is a standalone film.
