= Abrahaminte Santhathikal =

2018 Indian Malayalam-language action thriller film

- Abrahaminte Santhathikal official poster
- Directed by: Shaji Padoor
- Written by: Haneef Adeni
- Produced by: T. L. George; Joby George Thadathil
- Starring: Mammootty; Anson Paul; Kaniha; Tarushi
- Cinematography: Alby
- Edited by: Mahesh Narayan
- Music by: Songs: Gopi Sundar; William Francis; Score: Gopi Sundar
- Production company: Goodwill Entertainments
- Distributed by: Goodwill Entertainments
- Release date: 16 June 2018
- Running time: 131 minutes
- Country: India
- Language: Malayalam
- Box office: ₹40 crore

Abrahaminte Santhathikal (lit.: Descendants of Abraham) is a 2018 Indian Malayalam-language action thriller film written by Haneef Adeni and directed by Shaji Padoor. The film stars Mammootty and Anson Paul in the titular roles, with an ensemble cast of Kaniha, Tarushi, Renji Panicker, Siddique, Yog Japee, Kalabhavan Shajon, Maqbool Salmaan, Sudev Nair, Suresh Krishna, Shyamaprasad and Sijoy Varghese. Shot in Ernakulam, principal photography began on 5 January 2018 and ended in March. Gopi Sundar composed the music, and Mahesh Narayan handled the editing.

The film was released on 16 June 2018.

== Plot ==
A series of murders terrorizes a city, leaving nine victims from three families dead. After each killing, the murderer leaves a message indicating that ten people will be killed in total. The investigation is assigned to senior police officer Derrick Abraham, who identifies the pattern behind the murders and apprehends the killer before the final murder can be carried out.

Three years later, Derrick visits his younger brother, Philip Abraham, in prison, but Philip refuses to meet him and severs their relationship. In a flashback, Derrick and Philip are revealed to have been orphaned at a young age, after which Derrick raised his younger brother. While in college, Philip fell in love with Aleena, and their families approved of the relationship. However, Aleena is later found dead, and Philip is arrested as the prime suspect in her murder.

Derrick's superiors, Narayana and Dinesh, harbor resentment toward him after he refused to shield their sons from prosecution in a kidnapping case. Derrick arrested Dinesh's son, while Narayana's son died by suicide while attempting to evade arrest. Seeking revenge, Narayana assigns Philip's murder case to Derrick, expecting that any attempt to prove his brother's innocence would damage Derrick's reputation by creating the perception that he was abusing his position to secure Philip's acquittal.

Philip is convicted of Aleena's murder based on circumstantial evidence and sentenced to life imprisonment, leading him to resent Derrick for failing to defend him. Later, one of Philip's friends confesses that he and two others accidentally killed Aleena and framed Philip, but dies before the confession can be substantiated. Unable to reopen the case, Derrick confronts the remaining two men, who refuse to surrender.

Seeking revenge against Derrick, Dinesh arranges Philip's escape from prison and persuades him to kill his brother. Philip attacks Derrick and later kidnaps the son of Derrick's ex-wife for ransom. It is subsequently revealed that Derrick and Philip had secretly reconciled and staged their public feud to deceive Dinesh into facilitating Philip's escape. Together, they eliminate the two men responsible for Aleena's death, after which Derrick allows Philip to escape abroad. Derrick returns with the kidnapped boy unharmed, claiming that Philip escaped with the ransom money.

== Cast ==
- Mammootty as ASP Derrick Abraham IPS
- Anson Paul as Philip Abraham
- Kanika as Adv. Diana Joseph
- Tarushi Jha as Aleena Maria Jacob
- Renji Panicker as SP Shahul Hameed IPS
- Yog Japee as City Police Commissioner Narayana Sethupathi
- Siddique as Dinesh
- Kalabhavan Shajon as CI Sukumaran
- Suresh Krishna as DYSP Johnny
- Sudev Nair as Brother Simon
- Maqbool Salmaan as Arun
- Shyamaprasad as Isaac IPS, RAW, Derick's Friend
- Spadikam George as Jacob, Aleena's Father
- Janardhanan as Priest
- I. M. Vijayan as DYSP Muhammed Jalal
- Sijoy Varghese as Joseph Esthappan, Diana's Husband
- Jayakrishnan as Joseph
- Sohan Seenulal as SI Varghese
- Mukundan as Father, School Principal
- Baiju V. K. as Joy
- Master George
- Adhil Unais Hussain
- Retheesh Krishnan
- Anoop Vijay as Nisam
- Gilu Jose as Mariya Joseph
- Bindu Delhi as Mrs. Sethupathi

== Production ==
Produced under Goodwill Entertainments, producer Joby George announced Abrahaminte Santhathikal on 7 September 2017, on Mammootty's birthday. It is the directorial debut of Shaji Padoor, an associate director in Malayalam cinema for 22 years, and is scripted by Haneef Adeni. IMammootty had been asking Padoor to direct a film for over 15 years and had given an open date. Mammootty plays an IPS officer named Derrick Abraham in the film. Shaji Padoor said that the plot revolves around an investigation, but it is not a dark thriller, and the protagonist appears uniformly in one or two shots only. The other cast and crew had yet to be finalised as of January.

Anson Paul, Kaniha, Siddique, Renji Panicker, Suresh Krishna and Tamil actor Yog Japee were confirmed by December end. With a puja event in Kochi on 1 January 2018, cinematographer Alby, editor Mahesh Narayan, composer Gopi Sundar and make-up artist Ronex Xavier joined the crew. At the event, Mammootty introduced his and Anson Paul's roles as "Abraham's two children". Anson and Ratheesh Krishnan, who plays a role, were also Mammootty's suggestions in the cast. Principal photography started on 5 January 2018 in Kolenchery, Ernakulam. Mammootty was shot on that day at a house in Choondy. Kaniha chose as a Mammootty film and joined in January's second week, playing a public prosecutor. Tarushi, who plays Anson's love interest, was shot for ten days. Filming ended by mid-March.

== Release ==
The movie was released on 16 June 2018 in Kerala. It was released in Gulf countries on 21 June and the rest of India the following day. The Times of India and International Business Times gave the film positive reviews.

== Box office ==
The film collected ₹41 lakhs from the US box office in four weeks. The film grossed $860,055 at the UAE box office in six weeks. It grossed a total of ₹40 crore worldwide at the end of its theatrical run.

== Soundtrack ==
Gopi Sundar composed the film score and two songs; the Christian devotional "Yerusalem Nayaka" video song was released in May. All the lyrics are penned by Rafeeq Ahamed.

Soundtrack
No.	Title	Music	Singer(s)	Length
1.	"Yerusalem Naayaka"	Gopi Sundar	Sreya Jayadeep, Arya V. S., Mehtab Azeen, Yeez K. Jolly, Devananda;	3:44
2.	"Mulla Poovithalode"	Serin Francis	Haricharan	3:29
3.	"Kanneerattil"	Gopi Sundar	Vijay Yesudas	4:03
4.	"Theme Music"	Gopi Sundar	Fura, Jasim, Gopi Sundar	2:49
