= Kanthalloor =

- Village
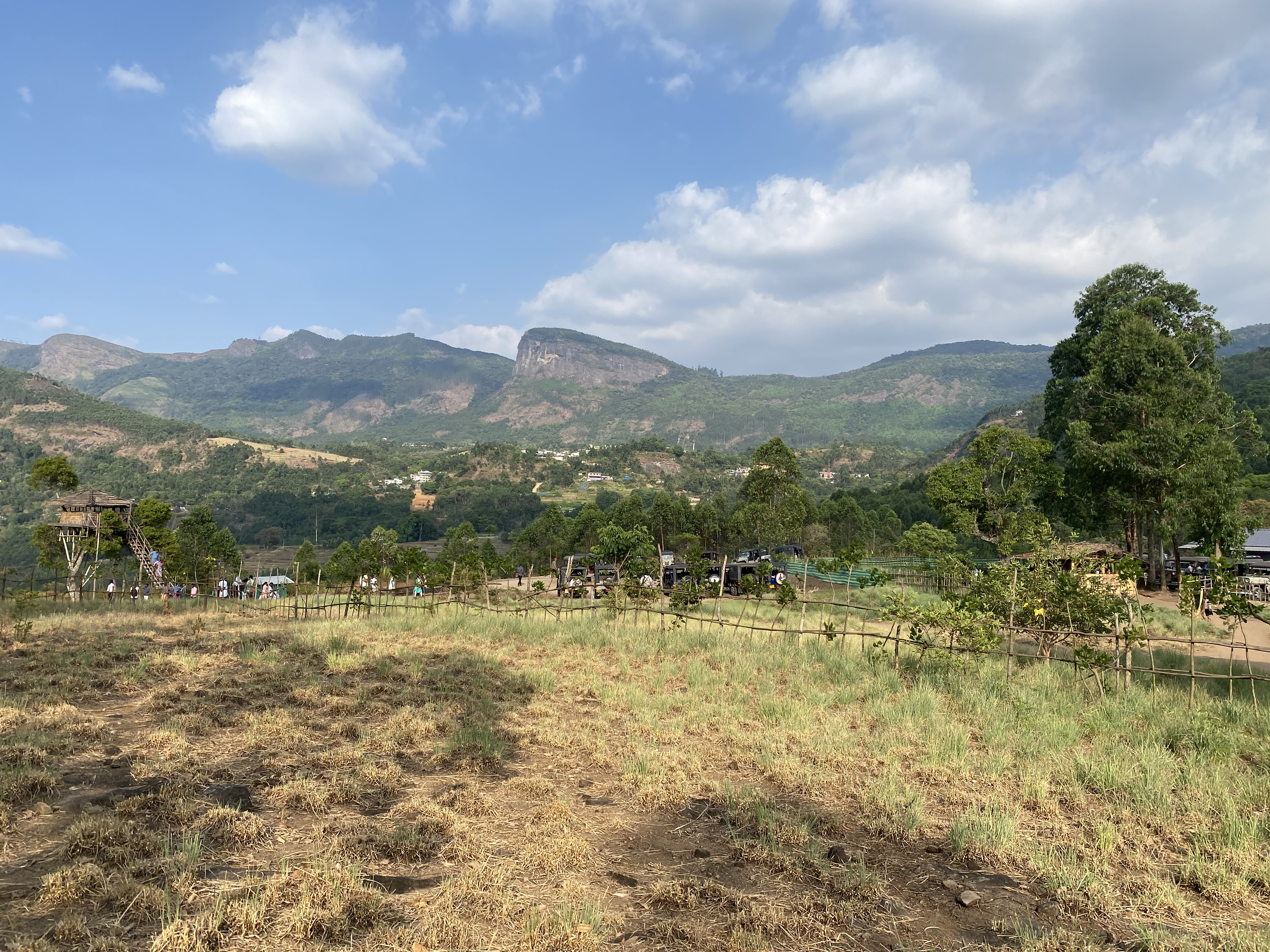
- View of Kanthalloor.

- Location in Kerala, India Kanthalloor (India)
- Coordinates: 10°13′0″N 77°11′0″E
- Country: India
- State: Kerala
- District: Idukki

Government
  - Type: Panchayati Raj (India)
  - Body: Kanthalloor Grama Panchayat

Area
  - Total: 48.42 km^{2} (18.70 sq mi)
- Elevation: 1,525 m (5,003 ft)

Population (2011)
  - Total: 6,758
  - Density: 139.6/km^{2} (361.5/sq mi)

Languages
  - Official: Malayalam, English
  - Regional: Tamil Malayalam
- Time zone: UTC+5:30 (IST)
- PIN: 685620
- Area code: 04865
- Vehicle registration: KL-68
- Literacy: 76.87%

Kanthalloor is a village in Devikulam taluk, Idukki district, Kerala. It is a village nestled in the Western Ghats of India. The salubrious climate and the picturesque landscapes and wide variety of tropical crops coupled with the close proximity to Munnar (a major hill station), has transformed this village into a tourist destination.

== Crops ==
Kanthaloor is famous for its wide variety of crops which are not seen in the other parts of Kerala. It is the only place in South India where apples are grown. it also includes varieties of orange, strawberry, blackberry, plums, gooseberry, egg fruits, peach, passion fruits and more.

== Transportation ==
The nearest national highway is NH 85 which passes through Munnar and can be accessed from Kanthalloor-Marayoor-Munnar.

== Geography ==
Kanthalloor is a virtually rain shadow village, lying in the eastern side of the Western Ghats near to Marayur. The place is famous for its cool season fruits and vegetables. Kanthalloor is famous for its apple, oranges, plums, peaches and variety of other fruits and vegetables that are not grown in other parts of Kerala. The Anaimudi Sholai National Park (formerly known as the Mannavan Chola) is the evergreen forest surrounding Kanthalloor. The major places of attraction include Pattisseri Dam, Kulachivayal rocks, Keezhanthoor waterfalls, Irachilppara waterfall, Erachilpara Waterfalls and the cave temple of Sri Rama.

== Demographics ==
As of 2011 Census, Kanthalloor had a population of 6,758 with 3,339 males and 3,419 females. Kanthalloor village has an area of 48.42 km^{2} (18.70 sq mi) with 1,778 families residing in it. In Kanthalloor, 9.9% of the population was under 6 years of age. Kanthalloor had an average literacy of 76.87% lower than the state average of 94%.

== Gallery ==
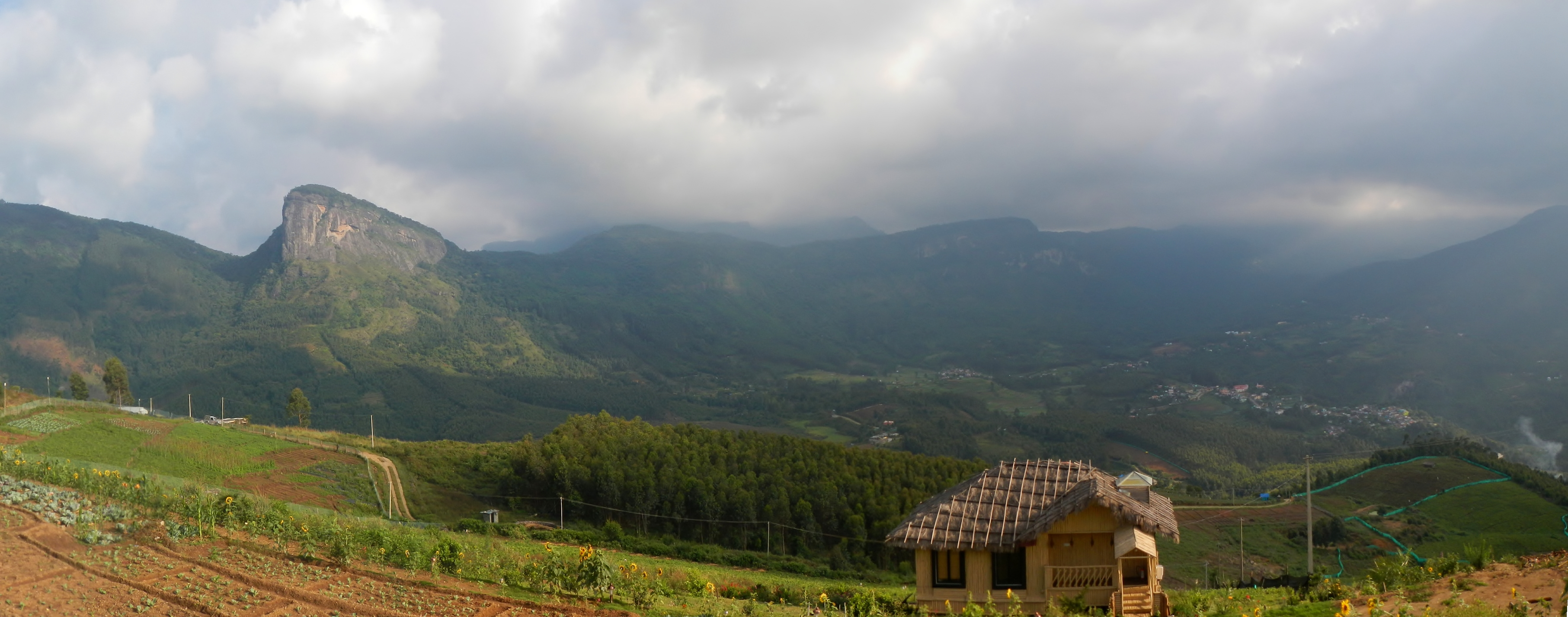
View of Kanthalloor, looking SSE.
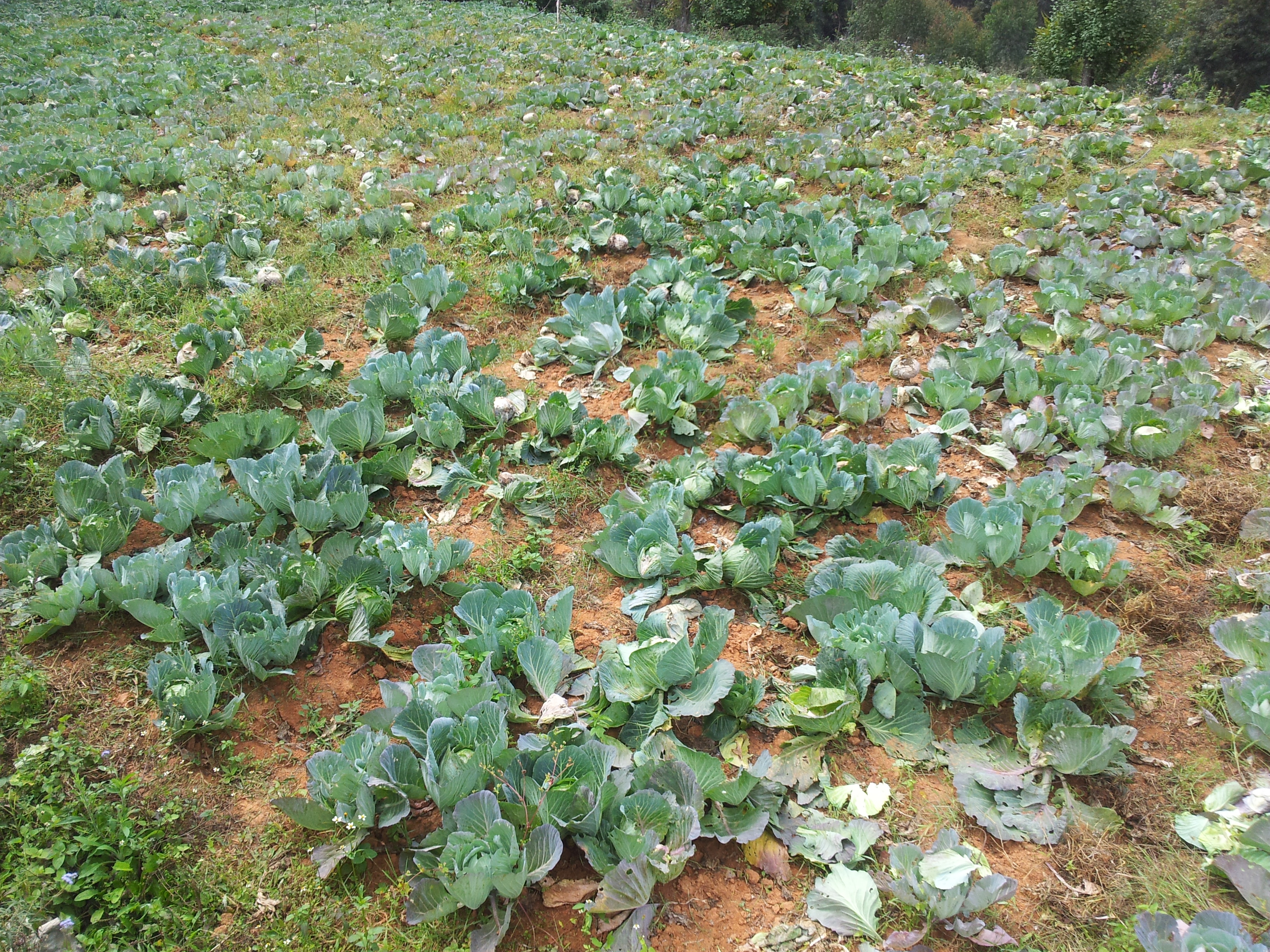
Cabbage field at Kanthalloor

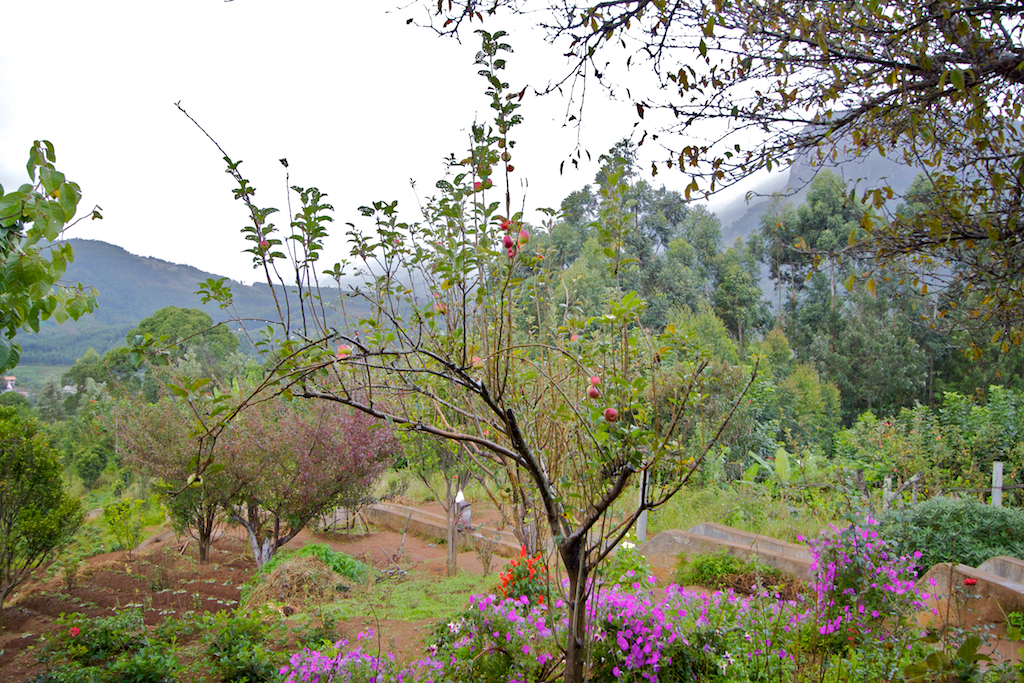
Apple farm at Kanthalloor

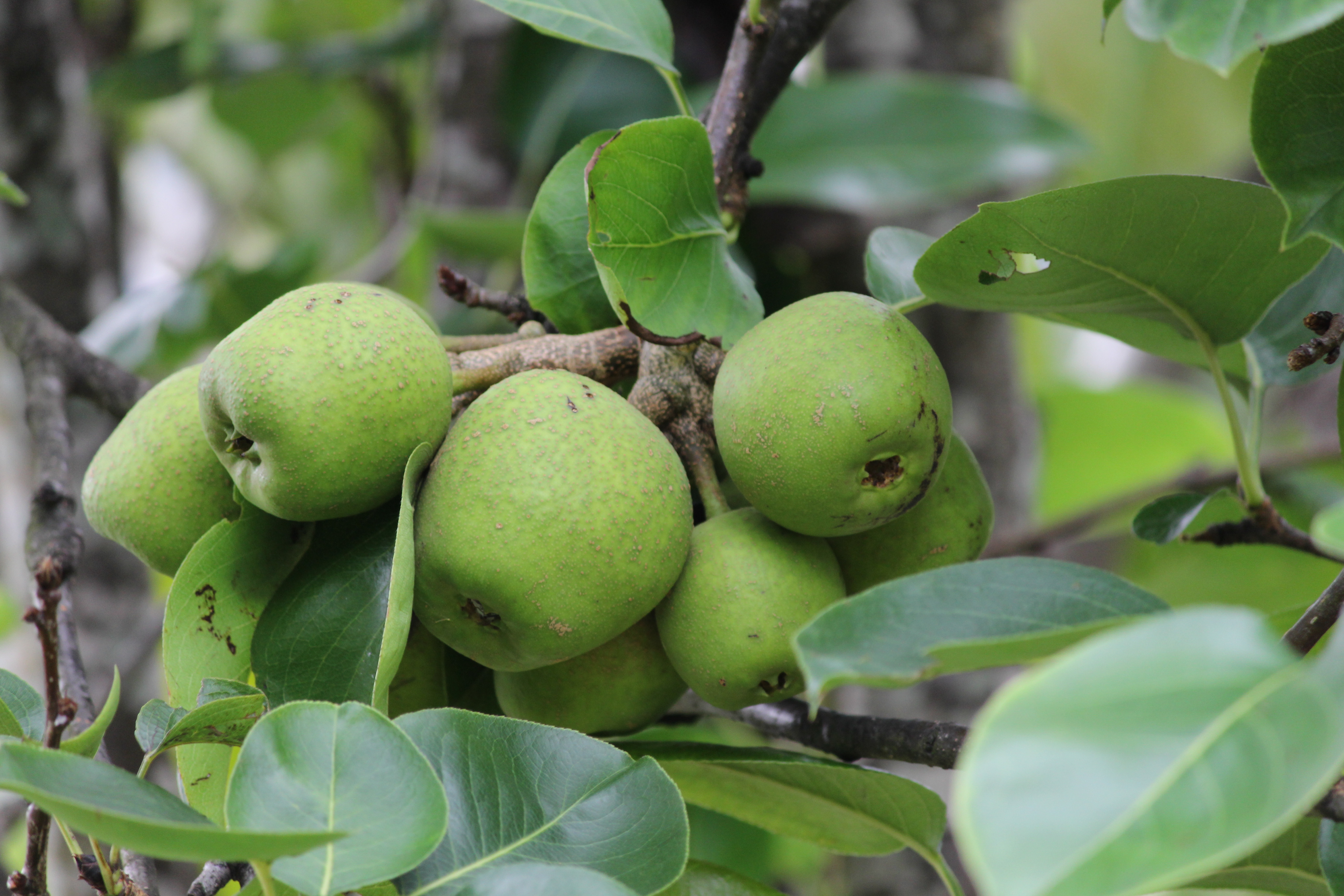
Quince farming at Kanthalloor

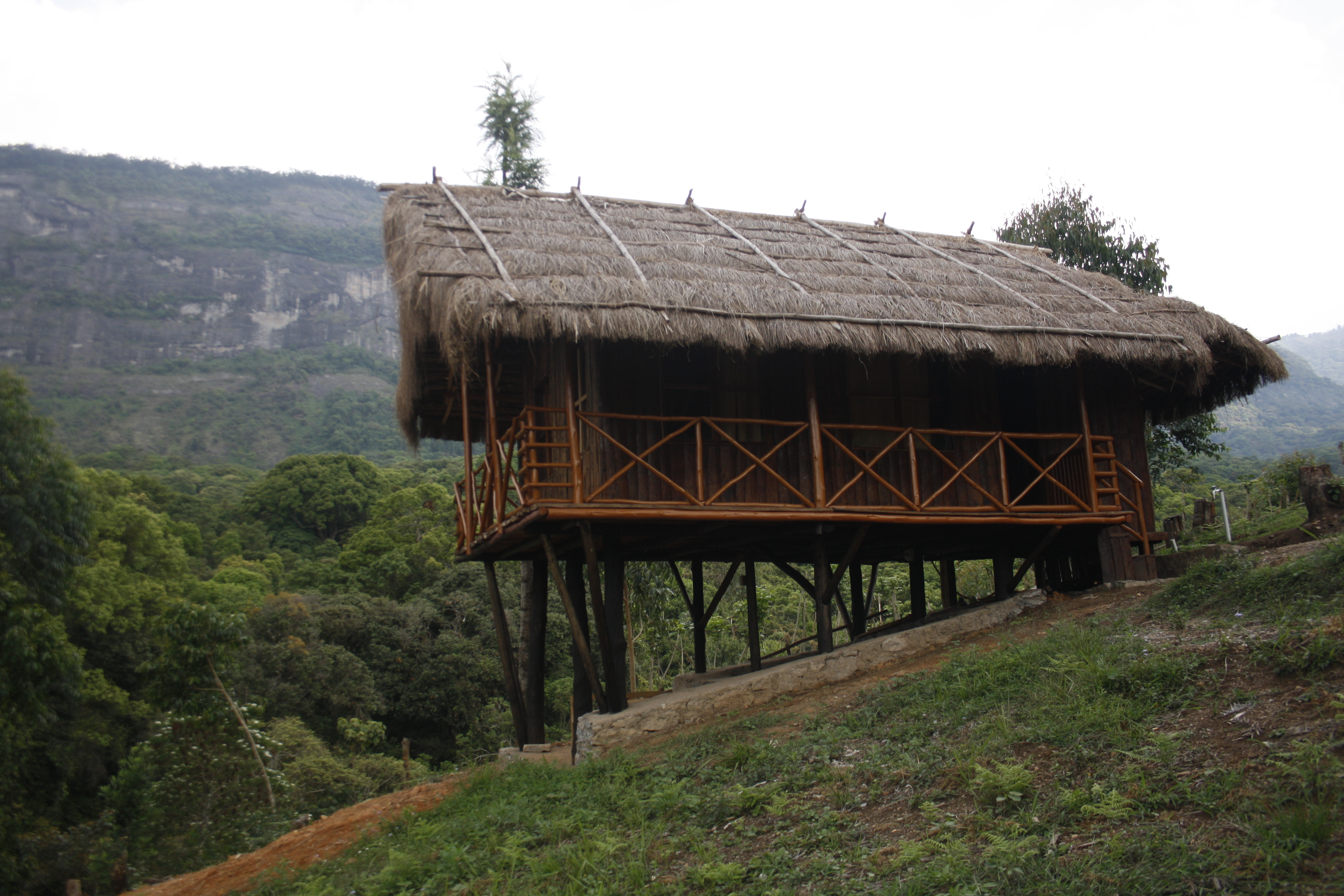
Kanthalloor hut

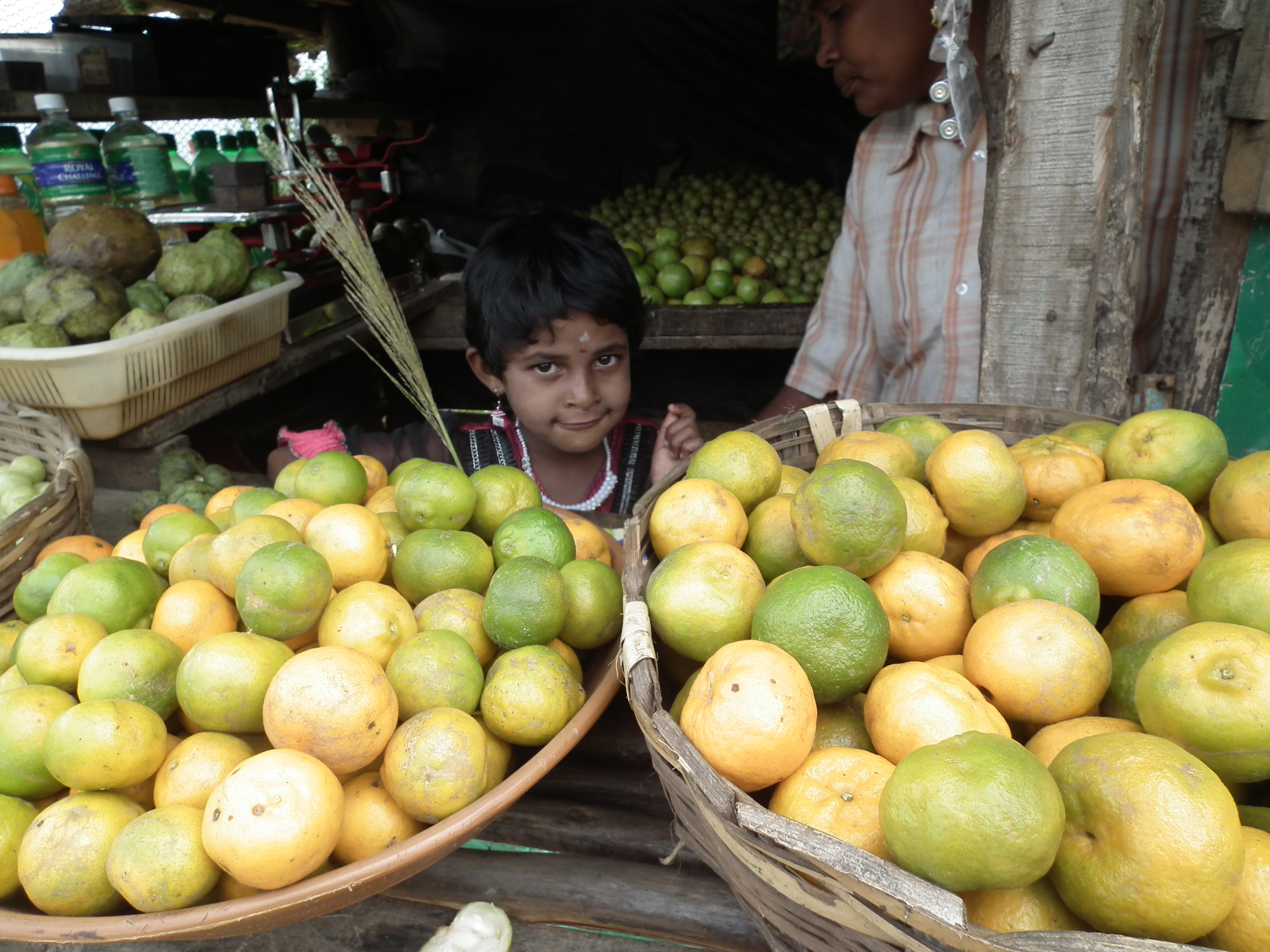
Fruit seller at Kanthalloor
