= Toxic (soundtrack) =

2026 soundtrack album by various artists

- Soundtrack album cover

Soundtrack album by Ravi Basrur, Vishal Mishra, Tanishk Bagchi, Faheem Abdullah and Arslan Nizami
- Released: 13 August 2026
- Recorded: 2025–2026
- Genre: Feature film soundtrack
- Length: 30:06 (Kannada); 32:57 (Hindi)
- Languages: Kannada; English
- Label: Zee Music Company
- Producer: Ravi Basrur

Singles from Toxic
- 1. "Tabaahi" Released: 2 March 2026; 2. "Manamohaka" Released: 21 July 2026

Toxic is the soundtrack album to the 2026 film of the same name written and directed by Geetu Mohandas. Produced by Venkat K. Narayana and Yash under their respective banners, KVN Productions and Monster Mind Creations, it stars Yash, Kiara Advani, Nayanthara, Huma Qureshi, Tara Sutaria and Rukmini Vasanth. The soundtrack album was composed by Ravi Basrur, Vishal Mishra, Tanishk Bagchi, Faheem Abdullah and Arslan Nizami.

The full album featured nine songs, with two of them being previously released as singles. It was released on 13 August 2026 at a special event in Mumbai.

== Development ==
The film's soundtrack album was composed by Ravi Basrur, Vishal Mishra, Tanishk Bagchi, Faheem Abdullah, and Arslan Nizami. Ravi Basrur also composed the background score of the film. Earlier, Jeremy Stack was announced as the composer for the film, but opted out of the project. However, Ravi Basrur was confirmed as the new composer, marking his third collaboration with Yash after KGF film franchise. In February 2026, Vishal Mishra, Tanishk Bagchi, Faheem Abdullah, and Arslan Nizami were announced as another music composers alongside Basrur. Anirudh Ravichander was also announced as the composer but due to the date issues, he opted out of the project.

The song "Tabaahi" was filmed in January 2025 in Goa and was choreographed by Ganesh Acharya.

== Release ==
The music rights for all languages were acquired by Zee Music Company. The first single titled "Tabaahi" featuring Yash and Advani was released on 2 March 2026 in audio format. The full video of the song was released on 8 July 2026. The second single titled "Manamohaka" featuring Yash and Sutaria was released on 21 July 2026. The film's album was launched at a special event in Mumbai on 13 August 2026. In the album, five songs were composed by Vishal Mishra.

== Track listing ==
=== Kannada ===
No.	Title	Lyrics	Music	Singer(s)	Length
1.	"Tabaahi"	Yogaraj Bhat	Vishal Mishra	Vishal Mishra	4:17
2.	"Manamohaka"	Pramod Maravanthe	Tanishk Bagchi, Faheem Abdullah, Arslan Nizami	Siddharth Basrur	4:05
3.	"Aaradha Gaaya"	Yogaraj Bhat	Vishal Mishra	Vishal Mishra	5:20
4.	"Maharaya"	Yogaraj Bhat	Vishal Mishra	Jonita Gandhi	2:51
5.	"His Aura Hits You"	Airaa Udupi	Ravi Basrur	Vishal Mishra, Santhosh Venky	2:42
6.	"Peek A Boo"	Yogaraj Bhat	Vishal Mishra	Vishal Mishra	4:08
7.	"Aaradha Gaaya" (Soul Version)	Yogaraj Bhat	Vishal Mishra	Vishal Mishra	2:30
8.	"Father & Son - Theme Music"	Instrumental	Ravi Basrur	Diana Ankudinova, Airaa Udupi	2:35
9.	"Blood On Blood - Theme Music"	Instrumental	Ravi Basrur	Instrumental	1:38
Total length:					30:06

=== Hindi ===
No.	Title	Lyrics	Music	Singer(s)	Length
1.	"Tabaahi"	Raj Shekhar	Vishal Mishra	Vishal Mishra	4:17
2.	"Madhosh"	Arslan Nizami, Syed Murad Gilani	Tanishk Bagchi, Arslan Nizami, Faheem Abdullah	Siddharth Basrur	4:05
3.	"Waqt"	Kaushal Kishore	Vishal Mishra	Vishal Mishra	5:20
4.	"Chingariyaan"	Raj Shekhar	Vishal Mishra	Jonita Gandhi	2:51
5.	"His Aura Hits You"	Airaa Udupi	Ravi Basrur	Vishal Mishra, Santhosh Venky, Airaa Udupi	2:42
6.	"Peek A Boo"	Vishal Mishra	Vishal Mishra	Vishal Mishra	4:08
7.	"Toxic"	Hanita Bhambri	Vishal Mishra	Hanita Bhambri	2:51
8.	"Waqt" (Soul Version)	Kaushal Kishore	Vishal Mishra	Vishal Mishra	2:30
9.	"Father & Son - Theme Music"	Instrumental	Ravi Basrur	Diana Anukudina, Airaa Udupi	2:35
10.	"Blood on Blood - Theme Music"	Instrumental	Ravi Basrur	Instrumental	1:38
Total length:					32:57

=== Telugu ===
No.	Title	Lyrics	Music	Singer(s)	Length
1.	"Tabaahi"	Ramajogayya Sastry	Vishal Mishra	Vishal Mishra	4:17
2.	"Manasaagadhe"	Ramajogayya Sastry	Tanishk Bagchi, Arslan Nizami, Faheem Abdullah	Siddharth Basrur	4:05
3.	"Entha Maayavi"	Ramajogayya Sastry	Vishal Mishra	Vishal Mishra	5:20
4.	"Maharaya"	Ramajogayya Sastry	Vishal Mishra	Jonita Gandhi	2:51
5.	"His Aura Hits You"	Airaa Udupi	Ravi Basrur	Vishal Mishra, Santhosh Venky, Airaa Udupi	2:42
6.	"Peek A Boo"	Vishal Mishra	Vishal Mishra	Vishal Mishra	4:08
7.	"Entha Maayavi" (Soul Version)	Ramajogayya Sastry	Vishal Mishra	Vishal Mishra	2:30
8.	"Father & Son - Theme Music"	Instrumental	Ravi Basrur	Diana Ankudinova, Airaa Udupi	2:35
9.	"Blood on Blood - Theme Music"	Instrumental	Ravi Basrur	Instrumental	1:38
Total length:					30:06

=== Tamil ===
No.	Title	Lyrics	Music	Singer(s)	Length
1.	"Tabaahi"	Vignesh Shivan	Vishal Mishra	Vishal Mishra	4:17
2.	"Thadumaarudhe"	Vignesh Shivan	Tanishk Bagchi, Arslan Nizami & Faheem Abdullah	Siddharth Basrur	4:05
3.	"Vitupogaadha"	Vignesh Shivan	Vishal Mishra	Vishal Mishra	5:20
4.	"Oh Raya"	Vignesh Shivan	Vishal Mishra	Jonita Gandhi	2:51
5.	"His Aura Hits You"	Airaa Udupi	Ravi Basrur	Vishal Mishra, Santhosh Venky, Airaa Udupi	2:42
6.	"Peek A Boo"	Vishal Mishra	Vishal Mishra	Vishal Mishra	4:08
7.	"Vitupogaadha" (Soul Version)	Vignesh Shivan	Vishal Mishra	Vishal Mishra	2:30
8.	"Father & Son - Theme Music"	Instrumental	Ravi Basrur	Diana Ankudinova, Airaa Udupi	2:35
9.	"Blood on Blood - Theme Music"	Instrumental	Ravi Basrur	Instrumental	1:38
Total length:					30:06

=== Malayalam ===
No.	Title	Lyrics	Music	Singer(s)	Length
1.	"Tabaahi"	Rafeeq Ahamed	Vishal Mishra	Vishal Mishra	4:17
2.	"Madhumohini"	Rajeev Govindan	Tanishk Bagchi, Arslan Nizami & Faheem Abdullah	Siddharth Basrur	4:05
3.	"Kaalamam Chakravaathathil"	Rafeeq Ahamed	Vishal Mishra	Vishal Mishra	5:20
4.	"Maharaja"	Rajeev Govindan	Vishal Mishra	Jonita Gandhi	2:51
5.	"His Aura Hits You"	Airaa Udupi	Ravi Basrur	Vishal Mishra, Santhosh Venky, Airaa Udupi	2:42
6.	"Peek A Boo"	Vishal Mishra	Vishal Mishra	Vishal Mishra	4:08
7.	"Kaalamam Chakravaathathil" (Soul Version)	Rafeeq Ahamed	Vishal Mishra	Vishal Mishra	2:30
8.	"Father & Son - Theme Music"	Instrumental	Ravi Basrur	Diana Ankudinova, Airaa Udupi	2:35
9.	"Blood on Blood - Theme Music"	Instrumental	Ravi Basrur	Instrumental	1:38
Total length:					30:06

== Non-album singles ==
No.	Title	Music	Singer(s)	Length
1.	"Toxic Title OST"	Jeremy Stack	Shruti Haasan	1:17
2.	"Birthday Peek"	Ravi Basrur	Pavan Basrur, Yeir Albeg Wein, Airaa Udupi	0:59
3.	"Introducing Raya – Daddy is Home"	Ravi Basrur	Instrumental	0:24
4.	"Toxic Teaser Theme"	Ravi Basrur	Instrumental	2:00
5.	"Raya Core Theme"	Ravi Basrur	Instrumental	0:31
6.	"Manners"	Ravi Basrur	Instrumental	0:17
7.	"I am Home"	Ravi Basrur	Instrumental	0:34
8.	"Ladies & Ladies"	Ravi Basrur	Instrumental	1:24
