= Zee Music Company =

Indian music company

- Industry: Music and entertainment
- Founded: 31 March 2014; 12 years ago
- Headquarters: Mumbai, India
- Key people: Punit Goenka (chief executive officer, ZEEL); Sujal Parekh (chief business officer)
- Products: Film music, regional music, devotional music and independent music
- Services: Music acquisition, publishing, licensing and distribution
- Parent: Zee Entertainment Enterprises

YouTube information
- Channel: Zee Music Company
- Years active: 2014–present
- Genre: Music
- Subscribers: 123.3 million
- Views: 92.8 billion
- Last updated: 6 Nov 2026
- Website: www.zee.com/products-platforms-music/

Zee Music Company (ZMC) is an Indian record label and music-publishing business owned by Zee Entertainment Enterprises (ZEEL). It was launched on 31 March 2014 to acquire, publish, license and distribute film and non-film music.

The label's catalogue includes Hindi-film music, regional-language releases, devotional music and independent singles. In its financial year 2025–26 earnings update, ZEEL reported that its music business had a library of more than 20,000 songs and a YouTube network with more than 176 million subscribers and 217 billion cumulative video views.

== History ==
Logo used from 2017 to 2025

=== Predecessor: Zee Records ===
ZEEL had previously operated a music-publishing division called Zee Records. The division began operations in 1994 and later launched Zee Records Home Video.

=== Founding ===
In March 2014, ZEEL launched Zee Music Company as a dedicated music acquisition and distribution venture. At the launch, ZEEL managing director and chief executive officer Punit Goenka said that the company intended to strengthen its ownership of intellectual property and expand its participation in digital music.

=== Expansion ===
Following its launch, Zee Music Company expanded through acquisitions of film-music rights and releases in Hindi and regional languages. ZEEL's official music page states that the catalogue spans 22 languages and includes more than 18,000 released songs and music from more than 1,100 film titles.

In 2026, the label expanded its artist-led, non-film catalogue by signing Adnan Sami and singer-producer QARAN for independent releases.

== Operations ==
Zee Music Company acquires and licenses music rights from film producers, studios and independent artists. It distributes music through video platforms, digital music services and other licensing arrangements. ZEEL reported acquiring rights to 47 Hindi-film projects, 57 other-language projects and 593 singles or albums during the 2024–25 financial year.

In April 2026, Zee Music Company entered into a strategic international partnership with the American music company EMPIRE. Under the agreement, EMPIRE distributes portions of Zee Music Company's catalogue on selected streaming services outside India and the companies collaborate on cross-border creative and marketing projects.

Sujal Parekh was appointed business head of Zee Music Company in 2025 and was designated a senior management person at ZEEL in 2026.

== Catalogue ==
Zee Music Company's catalogue covers film soundtracks, regional cinema, devotional recordings and non-film singles. The label has acquired music from Hindi, Marathi, Punjabi, Bengali, Bhojpuri, Gujarati, Tamil, Telugu, Kannada and Malayalam productions.

Among its 2026 film-rights acquisitions was the soundtrack of Toxic: A Fairy Tale for Grown-Ups, produced by KVN Productions and Monster Mind Creations. The agreement covered the film's soundtrack in Hindi, Kannada, Telugu, Tamil and Malayalam.

The label's independent-music releases include Adnan Sami's 2026 single "Lipstick".

== Digital presence ==
Zee Music Company distributes music through services including YouTube, Spotify, Apple Music, Amazon Music and JioSaavn. In April 2026, Music Business Worldwide reported that Universal Music Group distributed the label's catalogue on Spotify globally, while EMPIRE's agreement covered selected other streaming platforms outside India.

The main Zee Music Company YouTube channel crossed 100 million subscribers in 2025 and received YouTube's Red Diamond Creator Award. Across all of its YouTube channels, ZEEL reported approximately 190 billion views during the 2024–25 financial year.

In 2022, Zee Music Company ended its licensing agreement with the streaming service Gaana. On 21 March 2023, its catalogue was removed from Spotify after negotiations to renew a licensing agreement failed.

== Controversy ==
In 2015, singer Sonu Nigam alleged that he had been banned by the Zee Network after posting messages in support of politician Kumar Vishwas.
