= Haneef Adeni =

Indian film director and screenwriter

- Born: 30 June 1987 (age 39); Ernakulam, Kerala, India
- Occupations: Film director; screenwriter
- Years active: 2017–present
- Known for: Marco (Film)

Haneef Adeni (born 30 June 1987) is an Indian film director and screenwriter, who works in Malayalam cinema. Adeni made his directorial debut in the 2017 film The Great Father. He is widely known as the director of Marco.

== Career ==
Haneef Adeni's debut movie was The Great Father starring Mammootty in the lead. The film was released on 30 March 2017, and received positive reviews from critics and was a commercial success. It grossed $960,748 from the UAE box office in two weeks.

Abrahaminte Santhathikal, his next film as a writer was a production of Goodwill Entertainments and was announced on 7 September 2017 by producer Joby George on Mammootty's birthday. It was the directorial debut of Shaji Padoor, an associate director in Malayalam cinema for 22 years. The movie was released on 16 June 2018 in Kerala. It was released in Gulf countries on 21 June and in rest of India the following day. The Times of India and International Business Times gave the film positive reviews.

On 12 July 2018, Adeni announced his second directorial film Mikhael produced by Anto Joseph under the banner Anto Joseph Film Company.

In 2023, he returned with his third directorial venture, Ramachandra Boss & Co starring Nivin Pauly in the lead role. The film released on 25 August 2023 and, despite expectations, garnered mixed-to-negative reviews and did not perform well at the box office.

On 2024 film Marco, the standalone spin off Mikhael on 20 December 2024 to positive reviews from critics. The film grossed ₹104–115 crore worldwide on 12 January 2025.

== Filmography ==
Year	Film	Credited as		Notes	Ref(s)
Year	Film	Director	Writer	Notes	Ref(s)
2017	The Great Father	Yes	Yes	Debut film	
2018	Abrahaminte Santhathikal		Yes		
2019	Mikhael	Yes	Yes		
2023	Ramachandra Boss & Co	Yes	Yes		
2024	Marco	Yes	Yes	Spinoff of Mikhael film	
