= The Great Father =

2017 film by Haneef Adeni

- Release poster
- Directed by: Haneef Adeni
- Written by: Haneef Adeni
- Produced by: Prithviraj Sukumaran; Santosh Sivan; Arya; Shaji Nadesan
- Starring: Mammootty; Arya; Sneha; Anikha; Malavika Mohanan
- Cinematography: Roby Varghese Raj
- Edited by: Noufal Abdullah
- Music by: Sushin Shyam
- Production company: August Cinema
- Distributed by: August Cinema
- Release date: 30 March 2017
- Running time: 152 minutes
- Country: India
- Language: Malayalam
- Budget: ₹6 crore
- Box office: est. ₹50 crore

The Great Father is a 2017 Indian Malayalam-language neo-noir crime thriller film directed by Haneef Adeni and produced by August Cinema. It stars Mammootty, Arya, Sneha, Anikha, Malavika Mohanan, Santhosh Keezhattoor, Balaji Sharma and Kalabhavan Shajon, with Shaam in a guest appearance.

The Great Father was released on 30 March 2017 to positive reviews from critics and became a commercial success at the box office.

== Plot ==
David Nainan is a busy businessman in Kochi, who returns home from his office to find his 10-year-old daughter Sarah lying unconscious after being brutally abused. David gets distraught and takes her to the hospital where his wife Dr. Michelle David works. Sarah recovers and reveals that she was attacked by none other than Joker, a notorious serial killer known for killing teenagers and police officers. An enraged David and Michelle decide to find and kill him to protect other girls.

David begins his own investigation, which causes CB-CID Andrews Eapen IPS to become suspicious of him, who was in a hurry to catch Joker. Eapen's friend Samuel was killed by Joker when he try to catch him. Eapen discovers that Sarah was one of the Joker's victims and aggressively questions her at home, where David warns Eapan for distraughting his daughter. David and Eapan starts receiving calls from the Joker, who is rumoured to be hiding in his safehouse at Gavi. They both heads to Gavi for killing Joker.

After getting into Joker's safehouse in Gavi, Joker attacks Eapan and David, where Eapen is badly thrashed and falls unconscious. However, David brutally kills Joker by stabbing his eyes using a dagger and pushes him into a cliff. In the aftermath, Eapan asks David about Joker's identity, where David reveals that Joker was actually his office worker James. Eapan also admits to having wanted to kill Joker. David returns to his home after being satisfied in killing the person who had abused Sarah.

== Cast ==
- Mammootty as David Nainan
- Arya as ASP Andrews Eapen CB-CID
- Sneha as Dr. Michelle David
- Anikha as Sarah David
- Malavika Mohanan as Inspector Meera
- Santhosh Keezhattoor as James alias "Joker"
- Balaji Sarma as Inspector Jose
- Kalabhavan Shajon as Sathyanathan
- Miya as Dr. Susan
- Sunil Sukhada as Principal Maithreyan
- Prajod Kalabhavan as Krishnadas
- Mukundan as Ravi Menon
- Sohan Seenulal as Gokuldas
- Aneesh G Menon as Asif
- Prasanth Alexander as Johny
- Nisthar Sait as Security Guard Narayanan
- I.M. Vijayan as Anto
- Deepak Parambol as ACP Shahul
- Baiju V.K as Waseem
- Rony David as Franco
- Vijayakumar as Simon KP
- Anu Joseph as Child Welfare Counselor
- Shaji Nadesan as School Chairman Joby
- Aaryan Krishna Menon as David Office Staff
- Subeesh Sudhi as Pauly
- Molly Kannamaly as Colony Mariyam
- Anup Pazhayakada as a street guy
- Shaam as ASP Samuel Jacob (Cameo Appearance)

== Production ==
On 19 August 2016, actor Mammootty shared the first-look poster of the film on his Facebook profile. The film was produced by Prithviraj Sukumaran, Arya, Santosh Sivan, and Shaji Nadesan under the banner of August Cinema. South Indian actress Sneha plays the female lead. Although it was originally thought Sara Arjun would be acting as Sara, the daughter, Anikha was eventually cast in that role. Prithviraj Sukumaran was originally thought to do the role of a police officer but was later replaced by Arya due to physique issues. Later Malavika Mohanan replaced Mamta Mohandas for the role of woman inspector. Eventually Santhosh Keezhattoor opted to play the antagonist, the Joker.

On 4 September 2016, principal photography began in Wagamon, Kochi, with other shooting locations including Thrissur. Producer-actor Arya also plays a leading police role in the film. The actor himself released a teaser on 10 February.

== Music ==
The songs were composed by Gopi Sunder.

The Great Father

Soundtrack album by Gopi Sunder
- Released: 16 March 2017
- Length: 8:50
- Label: Anon Trends
- Producer: Gopi Sunder

Gopi Sunder chronology
Take Off (2017)	The Great Father (2017)	Georgettan's Pooram (2017)
External audio
- Audio Jukebox on YouTube

The Great Father - Songs list
No.	Title	Lyrics	Singer(s)	Length
1.	"Ko Ko Kozhi"	BK Harinarayanan	Nakshathra; Prarthana	3:04
2.	"Kai Veeshi"	BK Harinarayanan	Vijay Yesudas	5:46
Total length:				08:50

=== Original soundtrack ===
The original soundtrack of the movie was composed, programmed, and arranged by Sushin Shyam.

The Great Father

Soundtrack album by Sushin Shyam
- Released: 16 March 2017
- Genre: Feature film soundtrack
- Length: 40:30
- Producer: Sushin Shyam

Sushin Shyam chronology
Ezra (2017)	The Great Father (2017)	Villain (2017)
External audio
- Audio Jukebox on YouTube

The Great Father (Original Motion Picture Soundtrack)
No.	Title	Length
1.	"Title Credits"	02:19
2.	"I'm on to you"	02:50
3.	"Sarah packs a gun for school"	01:26
4.	"Great father theme Ft. Bless the mess"	02:05
5.	"King David"	02:04
6.	"A memory, so frightening Ft. kai veeshi song by Gopi sundar"	05:20
7.	"Andrews the badass cop"	03:09
8.	"The findings"	02:58
9.	"Joker Ft. George Peter"	02:49
10.	"The Black Beast in David"	02:04
11.	"Black beast Vs Badass Cop"	02:24
12.	"Exposed"	03:00
13.	"Torn up inside"	01:03
14.	"The Black Beast finds his way to Joker"	02:19
15.	"King David triumphs over evil"	01:53
16.	"Minnum Thaarangal Ft. Uthara Krishnan"	02:47

== Reception ==
=== Critical response ===
Deepa Soman of The Times of India gave 3 out of stars and wrote, "The Great Father is worth your money for its daddy-daughter moments and a timely plot. The film is quite predictable and one can see parallels in the factors that unveil the antagonist even in a few other Malayalam films."

Behindwoods gave 2.75 out of 5 stars and wrote, "Haneef Adeni has selected the perfect combination of emotion, mass and social relevance for his debut venture. The strong plot makes The Great Father watchable, but screenplay could have been dealt better." IBTimes gave 2.5 out of 5 stars and wrote, "The Great Father is a one-time watch and a tailor-made movie to boost Mammootty's heroism, where the real social issue gets lost in the antics at times."

=== Box office ===
The film was a commercial success. The film grossed $960,748 from UAE box office in two weeks. The Film collected ₹4.31crore on the first day of its release and ₹20.54 crore within 4 days which was an all-time record. It is the First 50 crore Movie by Mammootty.The Final gross collection of the movie is about ₹59 crore and had a 125 days run at the theatre.

== Release ==
The film was released in 202 screens in Kerala.

=== Home video ===
The film was released on Blu-ray on 7 July 2017.
