= Pradhama Drishtiya Kuttakkar =

2026 Indian drama film

- Theatrical release poster
- Directed by: Shahad Nilambur
- Written by: P. S. Subramanian; Vijesh Thottungal
- Produced by: Arjun Selva
- Starring: Parvathy Thiruvothu; Mathew Thomas; Sidharth Bharathan; Vijayaraghavan
- Cinematography: Roby Varghese Raj
- Edited by: Chaman Chacko
- Music by: Mujeeb Majeed
- Production company: 11 Icons Film Productions
- Release date: 11 September 2026
- Running time: 158 minutes
- Country: India
- Language: Malayalam
- Box office: est. ₹50 crore

Pradhama Drishtiya Kuttakkar (transl. Prima Facie Guilty) is an Indian Malayalam-language crime drama film directed by Shahad Nilambur and produced by Arjun Selva under the banner of 11 Icons Film Productions. The film stars Parvathy Thiruvothu, Mathew Thomas, Unnimaya Prasad and Sidharth Bharathan in lead roles, alongside an ensemble supporting cast including Vijayaraghavan, Vinay Forrt, and Tamil actor R. Parthiban. The film received mixed to positive reviews from the critics.

== Plot ==
The film starts with Aleena Abraham (Parvathy Thiruvothu) deciding to join the police force when the DIG offers her a government job for the loss she suffered when her husband was martyred in a police sting operation. She enrols in the police academy, a visibly male-dominated place, leaving her toddler with her in-laws — her only family.

She successfully finishes and joins the police force and gets to know the officers and is close with fellow officers CPO Sreenath (Mathew Thomas), ASI Dasan (Sidharth Bharathan), and CPO Divya (Unnimaya Prasad). Each struggles with their own problems; Sreenath has a girlfriend whose family is against their relationship due to caste and status differences, Dasan has a crush on a teacher he met during duty and wants to get married as he is already past his 30s, and Divya is struggling to conceive. Another officer, SI Xavier (Azeez Nedumangad), a womaniser, has a tiff with Dasan and is rude to the other officers, while the station is led by the well-meaning but bumbling Inspector Prathap Mohan (Vinay Forrt).

A clothing store sales manager, Jayaprakash “JP”, is secretly involved in a series of robberies with his co-worker and partner in crime, Meera. One day, Sreenath, Aleena and Dasan are on night patrol when JP comes in a car alone and evades the officers, only to end up in a chase and eventually be brought to the police station. He says he slipped past to avoid getting caught for being drunk but acts very uneasy, making Aleena send Sreenath again to check the boot space. It ends up in a scuffle over the car keys between JP and the police officers, during which JP gets hold of Divya’s gun and is fatally shot.

They also realise that he has other wounds and open the boot space to find the dead body of Meera. They decide to cover it up. They dispose of the bodies behind the police station while Xavier comes back, and he is told that a cat was buried. Sreenath drives off with the car.

The death of JP also triggers painful flashbacks for Aleena. As a child, she lost her parents in the shornur train accident and was left stranded alone, holding a small mother Mary statue and crying. She has a scar on her forehead from the incident and the memories continue to affect her. Her greatest fear is that her own daughter will one day experience the same loneliness, which drives her to fight desperately to protect the family she has left.

A few days after JP’s death, Divya discovers that she is pregnant.

News spreads that decorated war veteran R. Vasudevan (Parthiban) was brutally killed in his house during a robbery, and the case is handed over to Crime Branch led by Dy.SP Harris Meeran, someone admired by Aleena’s husband.

Harris, with his extraordinary skills, experience and observation, is quick to understand the modus operandi of JP and Meera in their burglary and also their identities. Vasudevan had realised that he was being robbed and trapped JP and Meera inside a room before confronting them. During the fight, JP used Meera as a shield, resulting in her death. Vasudevan continued to fight JP, but when JP got hold of the puppy he had bought as a gift for his daughter and threatened it, Vasudevan surrendered to save the puppy and was killed.

He also figures out that the voice note sent by Aleena to JP’s wife from his phone is fabricated as he increases the background sound and hears a specific Muslim prayer used only in the morning while the message was sent in the evening. Harris visits the station to meet with Prathap Mohan to see if their officers saw JP and Meera during patrolling, which they play off but still manage to alert Harris. He concludes that they are indeed the culprits after his daughter helps him determine the final location of JP’s phone which turns out to be the station and they get caught in a lie and has to gather the proof — body, weapon and manner — in order for the case to stand in court. CCTV is checked but they make a narrow escape that day is difficult to retrieve because of a blunder made by Prathap.

He returns with K9 cadaver dogs after Xavier alerts Harris that he saw something being buried on that day after spotting the apparently dead cat behind the police station.

Harris eventually discovers that the bodies were buried atop a towed vehicle. When the officers attempt to retrieve and move the bodies, they are surrounded by Harris and his officers. Aleena had cleverly buried an elephant tusk, evidence from another case, along with the bodies so that they could use it as a loophole in court.

Bodies are sent in for post-mortem and there is no bullet in JP’s body. Harris starts torturing and blackmailing the group to know where the bullet is, and it turns out Aleena is the only one who knows where it is. He puts her under narcotics analysis illegally and gets the answer and raids her home to find the bullet hammered into the back of a book authored by Harris.

Aleena has repeatedly used Harris’s book as a reference throughout the film while anticipating the investigation and creating loopholes. The relevant passages from the book are also read as part of the narration whenever she gets out of Harris’s traps.

The officers are arrested and taken to court. Now the last thing to be proved is whether the retrieved bullet was indeed fired from Divya’s service gun. They do a rifling marks test and shoot all the bullet rounds and compare the rifling marks with the crime bullet. All the bullets fired have the same rifling marks but none of them match the retrieved bullet, shocking Harris and the group is released on bail.

Divya gives birth, Dasan gets ready for marriage, Sreenath takes his girlfriend home and Aleena shifts to a better home.

In a final outside-court confrontation between Harris and Aleena, in a shocking twist, Aleena reveals that she took MDMA to counteract the effects of sodium pentathol used in Narcoanalysis and purposefully made him retrieve the bullet she got from the training camp with the help of her husband’s friend. The actual crime bullet is turned into a replica of her wedding ring as she melts it.

== Cast ==
- Parvathy Thiruvothu as CPO (Note: CPO stands for Civil Police Officer, a designation used for constable in the Kerala Police.) Aleena Abraham
- Mathew Thomas as CPO Sreenath Iyappan
- Vijayaraghavan as Crime Branch DYSP Harris Meeran
- Sidharth Bharathan as ASI Dasan
- Unnimaya Prasad as CPO Divya Abhilash
- Vinay Forrt as Inspector SHO Prathap Mohan
- Azees Nedumangad as SI Xavier
- Balaji Sarma as Crime Branch CI Sainudheen "Sainu"
- Sirajudheen Nazar as Jayaprakash "JP"
- Catherine Maria as Meera, Jayaprakash's Staff and Partner
- Jayashree Sivadhas as Shilpa, Jayaprakash's wife
- Midhun Venugopal as Sunil
- Suparna S as Dhanya
- Jaya Shankar as Manoj
- Vrindha Menon as Parvathy
- Bibin Joseph Vettukattil as Aji
- Rini K. Rajan as Abraham's mother
- Jayarajan Kozhikode as Abraham's father
- Anusha Aravindakshan as Manoj's wife
- Salman Kuttikode as Alan, Aleena's brother
- Kalabhavan Niyas as Abhilash, Divya's husband
- Nandini Gopalakrishnan as Harris Meeran's wife
- Shifa Badusha as Sana, Harris Meeran's daughter
- Praveen Selvam as Crime Branch ASI Praveen Kumar
- Dinesh Prabhakar as Drunkard Husband
- Lal Jose as Psychiatrist Dr.(Cameo Appearance)
- Asif Ali as CPO Abraham Mathew (Cameo Appearance)
- R. Parthiban as Rtd Major Vasudevan (Cameo Appearance)
- Sreejith Ravi as Doctor
- Hashmi Taj Ibrahim as Himself

== Production ==
=== Development ===
Following the success of his previous directorial ventures Prakashan Parakkatte (2022) and Anuragam (2023), director Shahad announced Pradhama Drishtiya Kuttakkar as an investigative thriller. The script was written by P. S. Subramanian and Vijesh Thottingal. The film is bankrolled by Arjun Selva under the banner of 11 Icons Film Productions.

Notably, the film marks a career milestone for lead actress Parvathy Thiruvothu, who plays a police officer for the first time in her two-decade-long acting career. She underwent physical and mental preparations over several months to fit the role.

=== Filming ===
The official launch and pooja ceremony of the film took place on January 2, 2026, in Koothattukulam. The first ceremonial lamp (Bhadradeepam) was lit by Member of Parliament Jebi Mather and lead actor Parvathy Thiruvothu. Principal photography commenced immediately afterwards. Major portions of the movie were filmed across sets established in Kottayam,Pathanamthitta (Maniyar) and Koothattukulam, particularly centred around an elaborate police station set designed by art director Makesh Mohanan.

== Music ==
The music and background score for the film are composed by Mujeeb Majeed, known for his melodies and atmospheric soundscapes in contemporary Malayalam cinema.

== Release ==
Pradhama Drishtiya Kuttakkar was theatrically released worldwide on 11 September 2026.

Home Media

The film’s post-theatrical streaming rights have been acquired by Netflix. The film released on 9 October 2026.

== Reception ==
=== Critical reception ===
Pradhama Drishtiya Kuttakkar received mixed to positive reviews from the critics.

Sajin Shrijith for The Week rated the film 5/5 and praised its non-linear screenplay, cinematography, performances and emotionally charged score, describing it as a benchmark in investigative thrillers.

Anandu Suresh for The Indian Express gave the film 2.5/5, describing it as a gripping crime thriller while criticising its convenient writing, resemblance to Drishyam and lengthy runtime.

S. R. Praveen for The Hindu described the film as a taut thriller and praised Shahad's direction and the screenplay for maintaining tension.

Anna Mathews for The Times of India rated the film 2/5, calling it a "passable cop drama" and criticised its unfocused screenplay, while praising the performances, cinematography and editing.

=== Box office ===
The film grossed over ₹50 crore worldwide within 15 days of its release.
