= Chaman Chakko =

Indian film editor

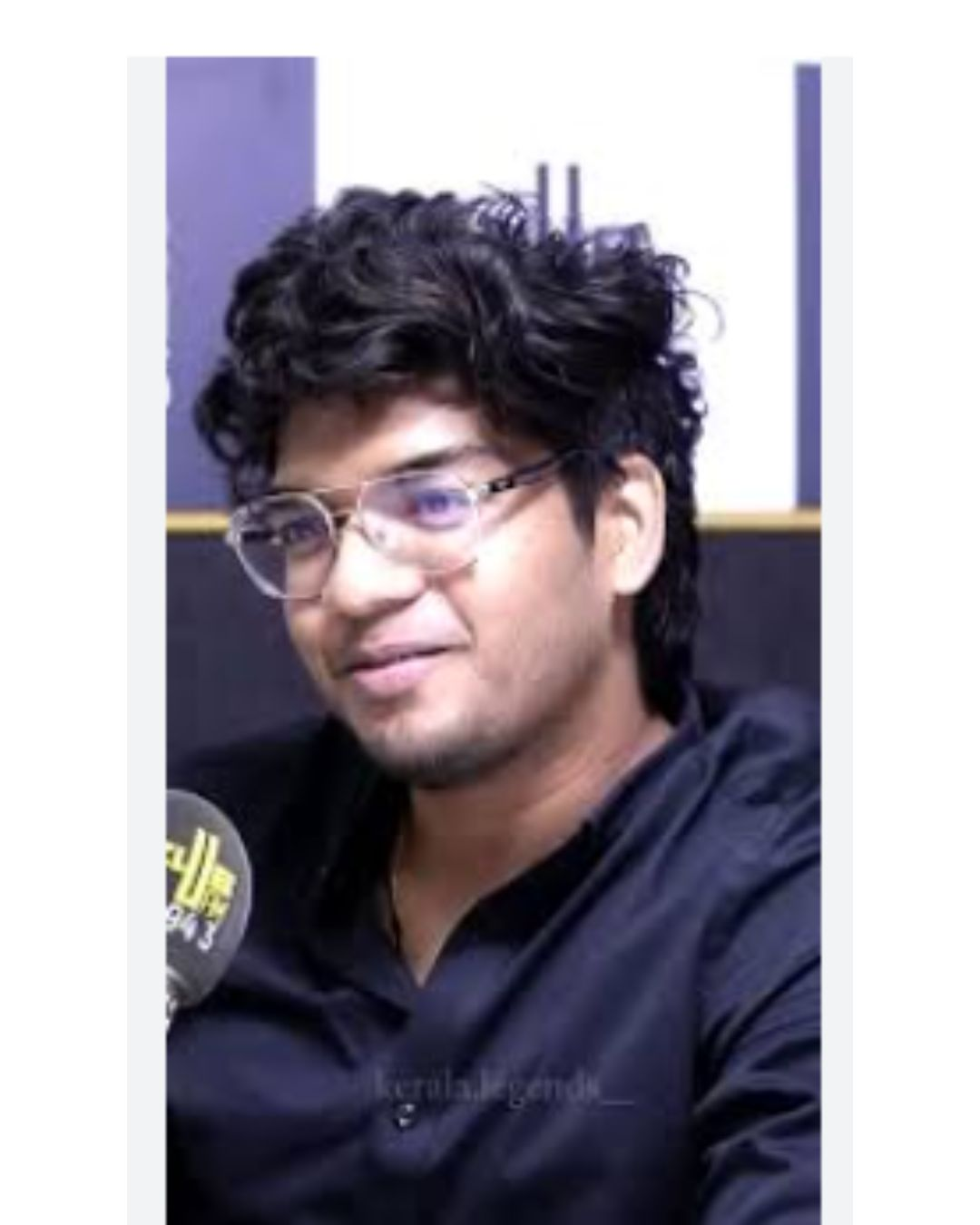
- Born: Nellikunnu, Thrissur
- Occupation: Film editor

Chaman Chakko is an Indian film editor working in the Malayalam film industry. He began his journey by directing and editing short films, which helped shape his visual storytelling skills. He later worked as a spot editor on several feature films before making his independent editing debut with Kala (2021).

== Filmography ==
=== As Editor ===
Year	Title	Director	Notes	Ref.
2021	Kala	Rohith V. S.	Debut	
2021	Daveli	Ranganaath Ravee	Short film	
2022	Jo and Jo	Arun D. Jose		
2023	2018	Jude Anthany Joseph		
2023	RDX	Nahas Hidhayath		
2023	Journey of Love 18+	Arun D. Jose		
2024	Samadhana Pusthakam	Raveesh Nath		
2024	Mura	Muhammad Musthafa		
2024	Hello Mummy	Vaishakh Elans		
2024	Sookshmadarshini	MC Jithin		
2025	Identity	Akhil Paul; Anas Khan		
2025	Bromance	Arun D. Jose		
2025	Officer on Duty	Jithu Ashraf		
2025	Maranamass	Sivaprasad		
2025	Detective Ujjwalan	Indraneel Gopeekrishnan, Rahul G.		
2025	Lokah Chapter 1: Chandra	Dominic Arun		
2026	Pennum Porattum	Rajesh Madhavan		
2026	Athiradi	Arun Anirudhan		
2026	Thudakkam	Jude Anthany Joseph		
2026	Khalifa: The Ruler	Vysakh		
2026	I'm Game	Nahas Hidhayath		
2026	Pradhama Drishtiya Kuttakkar	Shahad Nilambur		
2026	Hail Mary †	Vishnu Revikumar		
2026	Cosmic Samson †	Abhijith Joseph		
TBA	Thantha Vibe †	Muhsin Parari		
TBA	Thottam †	Rishi Sivakumar		

=== Other Editing credits ===
Year	Title	Role	Notes	Ref.
2018	Iblis	Assistant Editor	AE under Shameer Muhammed	
2018	Oru Kuttanadan Blog	Assistant Editor	AE under Shameer Muhammed	
2019	9	Assistant Editor	AE under Shameer Muhammed	
2019	Kodathi Samaksham Balan Vakeel	Assistant Editor	AE under Shameer Muhammed	
2019	The Gambler	Assistant Editor, Trailer editor	AE under Shameer Muhammed	
2019	Maarconi Mathaai	teaser editor		
2019	Sathyam Paranja Viswasikkuvo	trailer editor		
2019	Helen	Spot editor		
2020	Forensic	Associate Editor	AE under Shameer Muhammed	
2021	Chakra	On line editor	Tamil film	
2022	The Teacher	trailer editor		

== Accolades ==
Year	Award	Category	Work	Result	Notes	Ref.
2026	Critics' Choice Awards India	Best Editing — Feature Film	Lokah Chapter 1: Chandra	Won		
