= Sajin Gopu =

Indian film actor

- Born: Sajin Gopu; Aluva, Kerala, India
- Education: De Paul Institute of Science & Technology
- Occupation: Actor
- Years active: 2015–present

Sajin Gopu is an Indian film actor who works in Malayalam cinema. Hailing from Aluva, he made his acting debut in the 2015 film Mumbai Taxi in a minor role. Gopu first made his breakthrough with Churuli in 2021, and later that year with Jan.E.Man as well as Romancham in 2023.

== Early life ==
Sajin Gopu was born in Aluva as the eldest son of Gopalakrishnan and Pramila. He completed his high school education at the SNDP school and higher secondary education from Aluva Boys higher secondary school. Gopu completed college at the De Paul Institute of Science & Technology in Angamaly.

== Career ==
Sajin made his big screen debut in 2015 with Mumbai Taxi where he played a minor role. He then played another minor role in the film Thilothama . Gopu's role of the jeep driver in Lijo Jose Pellissery's Churuli in 2021 became a turning point in his career. The same year he played the character of Saji Vypin in Jan.E.Man, where his performance was acclaimed. In 2023, he starred in one of the lead roles in the horror-comedy Romancham and his character Niroop was well received by the audience. Sajin received much critical praise for his role as Ambaan in Jithu Madhavan's gangster action comedy Aavesham. Vignesh Madhu of The New Indian Express wrote, "Ranga's right-hand man is Ambadi, who he fondly—and funnily—calls Ambaan. It is an equally caricaturish role with the might of a beast and the heart of a baby. Sajin Gopu, in this role, is a ball of fire and perfectly complements Fahadh’s madness. These two characters ignite the film everytime it seems to run out of steam."

== Filmography ==
Key
†	Denotes films that have not yet been released

Year	Title	Role	Notes
2015	Mumbai Taxi	Terrorist Zia Thakbeer	Film debut
2015	Thilothama	Robi	
2016	Marubhoomiyile Aana	Sughu's friend	Uncredited role
2021	Churuli	Jeep Driver	
2021	Jan.E.Man	Saji Vypin	
2023	Romancham	Niroop	
2023	Neymar	Kannan	
2023	Chaaver	Asif	
2024	Aavesham	Amban	
2025	Ponman	Mariyano	
2025	Painkili	Suku Sujithkumar	
2026	Oru Durooha Saahacharyathil	Rajendra Prasad	
2026	Dhoomakethu	Lathin Kumar	

== Accolades ==
Year	Award	Category	Film	Result	Ref
2024	Mazhavil Entertainment Awards	The Entertainer of the Year	Aavesham	Won	
