= Adarsh Sukumaran =

Malayalam actor and scriptwriter

Adarsh Sukumaran is an Indian scriptwriter and actor who worked in Malayalam cinema. He was best known for his work Kaathal: The Core for which he won the state award for best story writing.

== Personal life ==
Adarsh had graduated from Mar Athanasius College, Kothamangalam, and is a postgraduate in television journalism. MT Vasudevan Nair inspired him to be a screenwriter.

== Career ==
He debuted as a film actor in the Amal Neerad movie Varathan. His first project to release as a writer was Neymar directed by Sudhi Maddison.

== Filmography ==
Year	Title	Credited as		Notes
Year	Title	Writer	Actor	Notes
2018	Varathan	No	Yes	Directed by Amal Neerad.
2022	Hridayam	No	Yes	Directed by Vineeth Sreenivasan.
2023	RDX	Yes	Yes	Directed by Nahas Hidhayath. Screenplay with Shabas Rasheed
2023	Kaathal: The Core	Yes	Yes	Directed by Jeo Baby. Screenplay with Paulson Skaria
2023	Neymar	Yes	Yes	Directed by Sudhi Maddison. Screenplay with Paulson Skaria
2026	I'm Game (film)	Yes	No	Directed by Nahas Hidhayath. Dialogue written with Shabas Rasheed and Sajeer Baba

== Awards ==
- He won the 2023 State Film Award for best story for the film Kaathal – The Core.
