= I'm Game (film) =

2026 Indian film by Nahas Hidhayath

- Theaterical release poster
- Directed by: Nahas Hidhayath
- Screenplay by: Sajeer Baba; Ismail Aboobacker; Bilal Moidu
- Dialogues by: Adarsh Sukumaran; Shabas Rasheed; Sajeer Baba
- Story by: Nahas Hidhayath
- Produced by: Dulquer Salmaan; Jom Varghese
- Starring: Dulquer Salmaan; Antony Varghese; Mysskin; Kayadu Lohar; Vinay Forrt
- Cinematography: Jimshi Khalid; Additional Cinematography: Jomon T. John
- Edited by: Chaman Chacko
- Music by: Jakes Bejoy
- Production company: Wayfarer Films
- Distributed by: see below
- Release date: 3 September 2026
- Running time: 173 minutes
- Country: India
- Language: Malayalam
- Budget: ₹80 crore
- Box office: ₹48.47 crore

I'm Game is a 2026 Indian Malayalam-language fantasy action film directed by Nahas Hidhayath, who co-wrote the script with Sajeer Baba, Ismail Aboobacker and Bilal Moidu, and produced by Dulquer Salmaan and Jom Varghese under the banner of Wayfarer Films. The film stars Dulquer Salmaan, alongside Antony Varghese, Mysskin (in his Malayalam debut), Kayadu Lohar, Samyuktha Viswanathan, Kathir, Vinay Forrt and Parth Tiwari.

Principal photography began in early 2025, and continued from 9 March 2025 to 16 April 2026, spanning over 150 locations across South India. The film's music was composed by Jakes Bejoy with cinematography by Jimshi Khalid and Jomon T. John. It was edited by Chaman Chakko.

I'm Game was released in theatres on 3 September 2026, coinciding with the Janmashtami weekend and received mixed reviews from critics praising Dulquer's performance, technical aspects, action sequences and background score but criticized the screenplay, pacing and predictable narrative. The film underperfomed at the box office.

== Plot ==
Dan John, a wealthy and lazy businessman living in Hyderabad has an intense gambling addiction which leads to his downfall in both business and life. The sheer chaos created by him during a sports betting session leads to a chase, which is followed by a road accident that causes Dan to lose his hand, later replaced with a transplant.

Post transplant the rehab goes successful. But post rehab, Dan starts to feel his right hand is not totally in his control like slapping his face, waking up routinely at 5 am, not letting him consume alcohol.. He starts to feel completely devastated by these thoughts of his hand not in his control. But a fight with a bunch of thugs, during which Dan gets the upperhand courtesy his new hand, makes him believe that the hand is helping him after all.

During a gambling session, the hand stops helping John after the arrival of David who was the kingpin of the huge betting underground hub and directed instructions to Dan, ordering to kill him. This leads to a chase where Dan almost kills David. Dan threatens not to listen to the hand and tries to reclaim control of his life, and this led to the hand almost trying to kill him. He is discovered injured, handcuffed to a wall by Isha, a physiotherapist who earlier helped him during physiotherapy sessions.

Dan tries to explain to the doctors about his hand not in control which the doctors brush him off having psychological problems. After a series of mental breakdowns, the doctor agrees to sedate his hand and while doing so, the hand almost kills the doctor, before finly being sedated.

Dan decides to trace the origins of the donor of his hand with Isha's help and traces it to Vignesh Das, a cricketer who passed away in a car accident, and was the same player that help beat the team Dan put his bet on earlier. Dan and Isha traces his girlfriend, Tharini who was in the city, and explains what happened to Vignesh, and his motive.

Vignesh Das was a cricketer who went from playing local matches to being drafted for the CPL, whos sponsor was David. He wins the hearts of fans and the respect from his Captain and the sponsor, David. Before the final Match, David pays Vignesh a visit and requests Vignesh to lose the match for him, as David wanted to profit the gains from the huge bets places on the Madras team. The captain, Jason Antony warns vignesh to follow whatever David says, revealing his involvement.Vignesh, however plays well and wins the trophy, leading David to kill Vignesh and frame his death as a car accident.

Dan decides to fulfill Vignesh last wish and decides to kill David. On the tribute match to Vignesh, Dan, Isha and Tharini are kidnapped and trashed but the hand awakens on listening to Tharini being beaten up and overpowers and finishes of David.

Dan feels guilty at the end; It was the greed of people like him that help create people like David and ruin the sport. Dan reveals to Isha that the hand was back in his control now, but at a confrontation with a pickpocket, it is revealed that the hand is still being controlled by Vignesh's spirit.

== Cast ==
- Dulquer Salmaan as Dan John, a businessman, recipient of a hand transplant and Isha's love interest
- Antony Varghese as Vignesh "Vicky" Das, a cricketer in Madras Raging Bulls and donor of a hand transplant (Extended cameo appearance)
- Mysskin as David Abraham, the gambling kingpin and the sponsor of Madras Raging Bulls
- Kayadu Lohar as Isha, Dan's love interest and physiotherapist (Dubbed by Haritha Balakrishnan)
- Samyuktha Viswanathan as Tharini, Vicky's love interest
- Kathir as Jason Antony, the captain of Madras Raging Bulls
- Vinay Forrt as Freddy, Dan's gambling Agent and friend
- Jayasudha as Mercy John, Dan's mother
- Shyamaprasad as John, Dan's father
- Ashvin Mathew as Dr. Sam Mathew
- Prabhakar as Balraj Bhai
- Parth Tiwari as Shaurya, David's right-hand
- Harshad as Sekhar, David's henchman
- Varun Pande as Dharam, David's henchman
- Eldho Mathew as Vicky's friend
- Midhun Venugopal as Dan's PA
- Veena Kaladharan as TV Reporter
- Neeraja Rajendran as Vicky's mother
- Bilas Chandrahasan as Vicky's father

Cameo appearances

- Zahrah S. Khan as Dancer in the "Loser" song
- Asif Ali as a gambler who lend the money from Balraj Bhai
- Yogi Babu as a thief who tries to steal Dan's wallet
- Nahas Hidhayath as Dan's driver
- Srinivasa Reddy as Gambler

== Production ==
=== Development ===
I'm Game was directed by Nahas Hidhayath, who previously directed RDX (2023). The screenplay was jointly written by Sajeer Baba, Bilal Moidu and Ismail Aboobacker, with dialogues by Adarsh Sukumaran and Shabas Rasheed. The film was produced by Dulquer Salmaan and Jom Varghese under the banner of Wayfarer Films. The project was initially associated with the working title DQ40, referring to Dulquer Salmaan's 40th film as a lead actor.

The film was described during its production as a sports-based thriller. Its technical crew includes cinematographer Jimshi Khalid, music composer Jakes Bejoy, editor Chaman Chacko and production designer Ajayan Chalissery.

=== Casting ===
Dulquer Salmaan was cast in the lead role. The cast also includes Kayadu Lohar, Antony Varghese, Kathir, Mysskin, Vinay Forrt, Parth Tiwari and Samyuktha Viswanathan. Kayadu Lohar was announced as the female lead, while Mysskin joined the film in a prominent role, marking his Malayalam acting debut.

Antony Varghese, who had previously worked with Nahas Hidhayath in RDX, was also part of the principal cast. Mysskin described his character as an antagonist in the film.

=== Filming ===
Principal photography commenced in 2025, with the production beginning in Thiruvananthapuram. Antony Varghese and Mysskin attended the film's pooja ceremony marking the beginning of production. Dulquer Salmaan was expected to join the production during a subsequent schedule.

The film was shot over approximately 11 months, covering 156 shooting days across more than 100 locations in South India. Mysskin completed his portions during the production, with the film subsequently moving through its remaining schedules.

Filming wrapped in April 2026, which was announced by Salmaan on his social media pages.

== Music ==
The film's songs and background score are composed by Jakes Bejoy. The first single, "Mazhavillaye" sung by Armaan Malik, was released on 10 August 2026. The second single, "Loser" sung by Salmaan himself was released on 27 August 2026. The full soundtrack was released on 29 August 2026 in the audio launch event, held in Kochi.

== Release ==
I'm Game was released Worldwide on 3 September 2026 in its original Malayalam language, also it was dubbed in Telugu, Kannada, Tamil and Hindi languages in standard, EPIQ and P[XL] formats. It was originally planned to release on 20 August 2026 on the onam weekend, clashing with Khalifa: The Ruler and Bethlehem Kudumba Unit, but was postponed due to unfinished post-production works.

=== Distribution ===
Annapurna Studios acquired the theatrical distribution rights for Andhra Pradesh and Telangana. Pen Marudhar acquired the theatrical distribution rights for North India, while Lighter Buddha Films acquired the theatrical distribution rights for Karnataka. Friday Entertainment acquired the theatrical distribution rights in France, Magic Rays in the United Kingdom, Suraya Filem in Malaysia, and myKinoPlex in Germany.

Home Media

The film’s post-theatrical streaming rights have been acquired by JioHotstar. The film is set to premiere on 06 November 2026.

== Reception ==
=== Box office ===
The film grossed ₹4.24 crore at the box office in Kerala on its opening day. The film grossed ₹10 crore net across in its first two days of release in India. The film's global box office concluded with ₹48.47 crore.

=== Critical response ===
I'm Game received mixed reviews from critics. Tanisha Bhattacharya of NDTV praising Dulquer's performance, technical aspects, action sequences and background score but criticized the screenplay, pacing and predictable narrative. S. R. Praveen of The Hindu noted that while the film begins with a promising and engaging premise, it ultimately squanders its potential by succumbing to familiar narrative tropes and highlighted that despite its intriguing setup, the long runtime and unfulfilled plot threads regarding themes like greed and wealth cause the film to lose its focus.

Gopika Is of The Times of India, awarded the film rating of 2.5 out of 5 stars and noted that while the film attempts to blend action and suspense within a game-centric narrative, it ultimately suffers from a predictable storyline and an uneven pace. While the performance of the lead cast and certain technical elements such as the cinematography received mild appreciation, the reviewer felt the script lacked the depth and tension required to make the thriller engaging throughout its runtime. Anandu Suresh of The Indian Express rated the film 2.5 out of 5 stars, describing it as an ambitious fantasy actioner that falls slightly short of its potential and highlighted Dulquer Salmaan's performance and the film's visual scale, while pointing out pacing issues and an uneven second half that relied too heavily on visual effects over narrative depth.

=== Audience response ===
The film received generally positive initial responses from audiences and critics alike, with viewers highlighting Dulquer Salmaan's powerful performance as a strong return to form. Praise was directed toward the film's engaging storyline, high-energy pacing, and technical execution, particularly its action sequences and background score. While a few viewers noted minor pacing flaws in the narrative, the film was largely appreciated for its entertainment value and strong theatrical appeal.
