= Dhoomakethu (2026 film) =

2026 Indian film

- Theatrical release poster
- Directed by: Sudhi Maddison
- Written by: Soni Babu Antony; Manu Madhusoodanan
- Produced by: Shyju Khalid; Sameer Thahir; Sajin Ali Pulakkal; Abbas Thirunavaya
- Starring: Sajin Gopu; Nikhila Vimal; Ganapathi S. Poduval; Shine Tom Chacko; Sidharth Bharathan
- Cinematography: Jinto George
- Edited by: Vivek Harshan
- Music by: Ankit Menon
- Production companies: Happy Hours Entertainment; A & HS Production
- Distributed by: Bhavana release
- Release date: 25 September 2026
- Running time: 120 minutes
- Country: India
- Language: Malayalam

Dhoomakethu (transl. Comet) is an Indian Malayalam language time loop comedy film directed by Sudhi Maddison. The film stars Sajin Gopu, Nikhila Vimal, Ganapathi S. Poduval, Shine Tom Chacko and Sidharth Bharathan. It was released in theaters on September 25, 2026.

== Plot ==
The film follows Lathin Kumar alias Kuttan, a 35-year-old man who is about to marry Sharmila, a woman he considers exceptionally beautiful. Despite his happiness at finally getting married, Kuttan is anxious that people attending the wedding will mock him for being an unsuitable match for the bride.

On the night of the wedding, few masked thugs arrives, kills Kuttan and abduct Sharmila. Subsequently, he wakes up in bed on the morning of the wedding, relives the same events and faces the same fate once again. The events are triggered by the appearance of a comet over Kerala, three thousand years after its previous passage. The film unfolds through Kuttan's attempts to avert this fate and make it to his wedding night.

== Cast ==
- Sajin Gopu as Lathin Kumar alias Kuttan
- Nikhila Vimal as Sharmila Balan, Kuttan's wife
- Ganapathi S. Poduval as Anti, Kuttan's friend
- Shine Tom Chacko as 'Tiger' Shekharan Kutty
- Sidharth Bharathan as Bheera, Shekharan Kutty's henchman
- Manju Pillai as Latha, Kuttan's mother
- Niyas Backer as Jalajan, Kuttan's uncle
- Srikant Murali as Scientist
- Suresh Krishna as Sura (voice only)

== Development ==
Dhooumakethu, directed by Sudhi Madison following Neymar, is being produced jointly by Happy Hours Entertainment and A & HS Production House. The film is written by Soni Babu Antony and Manu Madhusoodanan, distributed by Bhavana Release, cinematography done by Jinto George, editing by Vivek Harshan and music composed by Ankit Menon.

== Music ==
The music for the film was composed by Ankit Menon. The first song titled "Chiranjeevi", written by Vinayak Sasikumar and sung by Malayali Monkeys, was released on 29 August 2026. The song, "Anuraga Roopavathi", written by Vinayak Sasikumar and sung by Siyah Ul Haq and Ankit Menon was released on 16 September 2026.

== Soundtrack ==
=== Music by ===
- Ankit Menon
- Ashley Milred

| No. | Title | Lyrics | Music | Singer(s) | Length |
|---|---|---|---|---|---|
| 1. | "Chiranjeevi" | Vinayak Sasikumar | AjOopaaN | Malayali Monkeys, Libin Puckaran Erumeli | 03:03 |
| 2. | "Anuraga Roopavathi" | Vinayak Sasikumar | AjOopan, Ashley Milred, Abin Thomas | Ankit Menon, Zia Ul Haq, | 02:38 |
| 3. | "Pacha Kuruthi" | Muthu | | George Peter | 02:09 |
| 4. | "Madhana Raavukal" | Muthu | Abin Thomas | Afsal | 02:04 |
| 5. | "Shu Ra" | | Ashley Milred | Ankit Menon | 02:01 |

== Release ==
Dhoomakethu completed filming in 2026 February. When the first-look poster featuring underwater scenes was released in July 2026, it sparked discussions suggesting it was AI-generated; consequently, the makers released a behind-the-scenes video of that. Official trailer was released on September 19, 2026. The film was released in theatres in September 25, 2026.

== Home Media ==
Netflix acquired the rights for the film and started streaming from 23 October 2026.

== Reception ==
Writing for The Hindu, S. R. Praveen wrote that the combination of the time loop theme and humour works for part of the film, but some of its strengths are undermined by the weak writing of the background story. Anandu Suresh of The Indian Express gave the film a rating of 2.5 out of 5, praising its premise and the performances of Sajin Gopu, Nikhila Vimal, and Ganapathy, while criticizing its repetitive pacing, underdeveloped characterization, and weak execution of the time-loop theme. He also criticised the film's misogynistic treatment of women, particularly towards the central character, Sharmila, as well as its use of humour around stalking and romantic coercion. R. B. Sreelakha of Malayala Manorama praised the director for presenting the time loop concept in a simple and humorous manner, as well as the performances of the lead actors and Vivek Harshan's editing especially for the repeating scenes, but adds that the logical aspects of the time loop could have been explained more convincingly in the second half. The review published in Asianet News noted that the film's success lies in making repeated dream sequences feel fresh and new to the audience throughout the film.
