= Akhil George =

Indian cinematographer

- Born: Akhil George; 29 August 1990 (age 35); Kochi, Kerala, India
- Occupations: Cinematographer; producer
- Years active: 2017–present

Akhil George is an Indian cinematographer, who works predominantly in the Malayalam cinema industry. He is a graduate of the B.Tech in Electronics and Media Technology at Karunya Institute of Technology and Sciences, Coimbatore.

== Career ==
He started his career with the debut movie Adventures of Omanakkuttan in 2017 along with his college mate Rohith V.S, who directed the movie. Later gained acceptance for his collaborations with Rohith for the critically acclaimed movies Iblis and Kala. He did project design and jointly produced the movie Kala (2021 film) along with actor Tovino Thomas and Rohith V.S.

== Awards ==
He received the 2018 Vayalar Rama Varma Film Awards for Best Cinematography

== Filmography ==
As cinematographer
Year	Title	Director	Notes
2017	Goodalochana	Thomas Sebastian	
2017	Adventures of Omanakkuttan	Rohith V. S.	
2018	Iblis	Rohith V. S.	
2019	Kodathi Samaksham Balan Vakeel	B. Unnikrishnan	
2020	Forensic	Akhil Paul	
2021	Kala	Rohith V. S.	
2021	The Priest	Jofin T. Chacko	
2022	CBI 5: The Brain	K. Madhu	
2023	2018	Jude Anthany Joseph	
2025	Identity	Akhil Paul-Anas Khan	
2025	Bromance	Arun D. Jose	
2025	Aap Kaise Ho	Vinay Jose	
2026	Aadu 3	Midhun Manuel Thomas	
2026	Thudakkam	Jude Anthany Joseph	

As Producer
Year	Film	Director	Notes
2021	Kala	Rohith V. S.	
