= Kumbarees =

- Theatrical release poster
- Directed by: Sagar Hari
- Written by: Sagar Hari
- Produced by: Joby George Thadathil
- Starring: Vijayakumar; Ramesh Pisharody; Eldho Mathew; Aswin Jose; Tito Wilson; Jenson Alappat
- Cinematography: Sreekanth Eashwar
- Edited by: Aswin Krishna
- Music by: Sibu Sukumaran
- Production companies: Goodwill Entertainments; Joby George Creations
- Distributed by: Goodwill Entertainments
- Release date: 23 August 2019
- Running time: 120 minutes
- Country: India
- Language: Malayalam

Kumbarees is a 2019 Indian Malayalam-language action thriller film written and directed by Sagar Hari. It stars Vijayakumar, Ramesh Pisharody, Eldho Mathew, Aswin Jose, Tito Wilson and Jenson Alapatt. The film was released in theatres on 23 August 2019.

== Cast ==
- Vijayakumar as Sub Inspector Pappan Mathew
- Ramesh Pisharody as ASI "Psycho" Ramu
- Eldho Mathew as Manu
- Aswin Jose as Shambu
- Jenson Alapatt as Anil
- Ronna Joe as Meera
- Andrea as Jincy
- Mareena as Maria John
- Tito Wilson as John
- Dharmajan Bolgatty
- Indrans
- Ambika Mohan
- Shanu Bhutto
- Binu Adimali
- Ullas Pandalam
- Rithu Manthra

== Reception ==
Reader Aspect said of the film, "If you like mild thriller movie, this is the film for you."
