= Ansar Shah =

Indian cinematographer

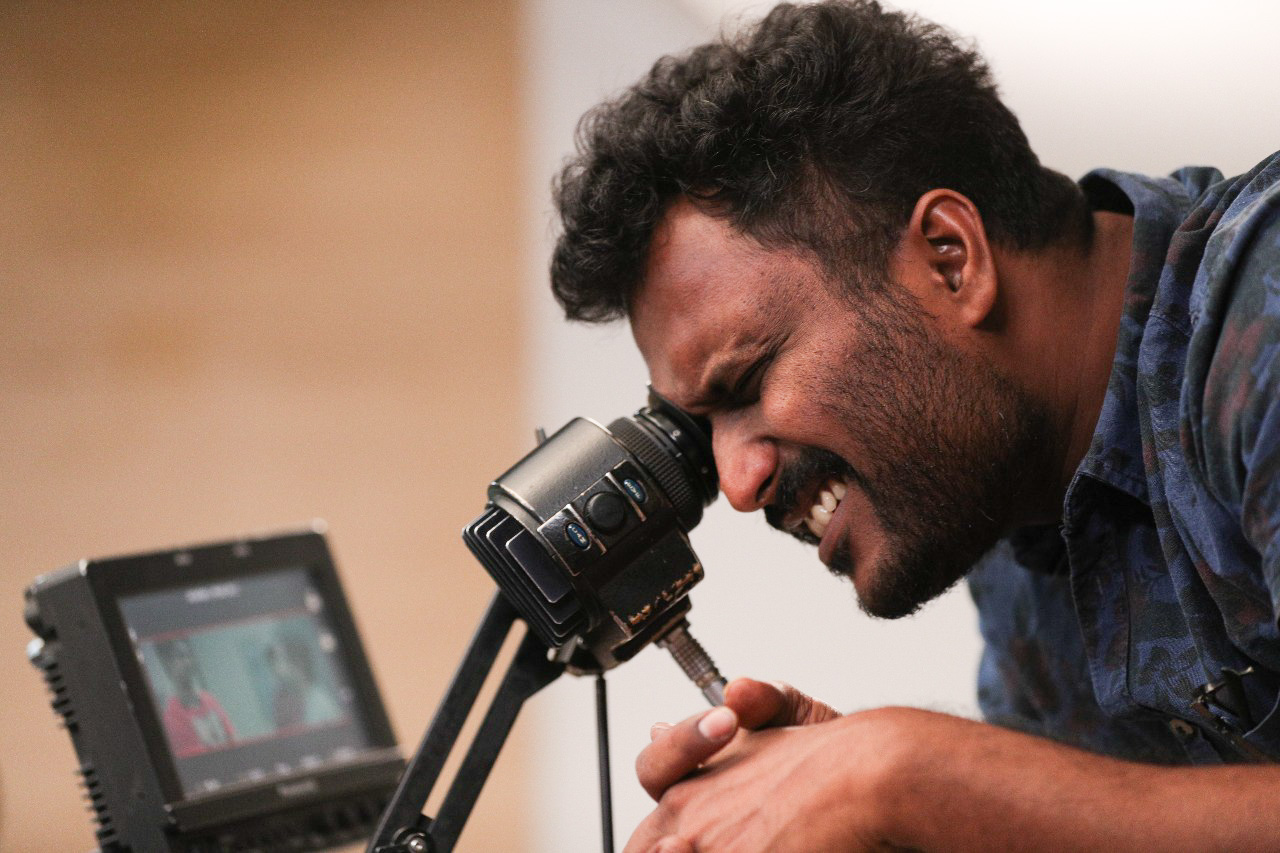
- Born: Ansar Shah; Nilamel, Kollam, Kerala, India
- Education: Film and Television Institute of India, Pune
- Occupation: Cinematographer
- Years active: 2000–present
- Spouse: Ashina Jahan
- Children: 1

Ansar Shah (also known Ansar Sha) is an Indian cinematographer, who works predominantly in the Hindi and Malayalam cinema industries. He is a graduate of the Film and Television Institute of India, Pune.

== Career ==
Shah started his career assisting established cinematographers such as Rajeev Ravi, Satyajit Pande, Kavin Jagtiani, Suresh Rajan and Rafey Mehmood in movies and commercials. He debuted in the Malayalam movie industry with Ishq in 2019. That was followed by work on Moonwalk, Liquor Island, and Jo and Jo.

He received the 2016 Kerala State Television "Award for Best Cinematography" for the movie short, Chaver.

== Filmography ==
As cinematographer
Year	Title	Director	Notes
2019	Ishq	Anuraj Manohar	
2021	Chaare	Sunil Gopalakrishnan	Musical Narrative
2022	Jo and Jo	Arun D Jose	
2023	Oh My Darling	Alfred D' Samuel	
2024	Oru Sarkar Ulpannam	T. V. Renjith	
2025	Moonwalk	Vinod AK	
