= Bromance (2025 film) =

Malayalam action comedy thriller film written and directed by Arun D. Jose in 2025

- Theatrical Release Poster
- Directed by: Arun D. Jose
- Screenplay by: Arun D. Jose; Raveesh Nath; Thomas P. Sebastian
- Produced by: Ashiq Usman
- Starring: Arjun Ashokan; Mathew Thomas; Sangeeth Prathap; Mahima Nambiar; Shyam Mohan; Bharath Bopanna; Kalabhavan Shajohn
- Cinematography: Akhil George
- Edited by: Chaman Chakko
- Music by: Govind Vasantha
- Production company: Ashiq Usman Productions
- Distributed by: Central Pictures
- Release date: 14 February 2025
- Running time: 150 minutes
- Country: India
- Language: Malayalam
- Budget: ₹8 crore
- Box office: ₹13.5 crore

Bromance is a 2025 Indian Malayalam-language action comedy thriller film written and directed by Arun D. Jose and co-written by Raveesh Nath and Thomas P. Sebastian. Produced by Ashiq Usman, the film stars Arjun Ashokan, Mathew Thomas, Sangeeth Prathap, Mahima Nambiar, Shyam Mohan, Kalabhavan Shajohn and Bharath Bopanna.

This movie was released on 14 February 2025, to mixed reviews from critics and audience. The film was commercial success at box office.

== Plot ==
Binto teams up with his brother Shinto's friends for a thrilling adventure to find him, leading to unexpected twists, discoveries, and unforgettable moments.

== Cast ==
- Mathew Thomas as Binto Varghese, Shinto's younger brother
- Arjun Ashokan as Shabeer Ali, Shinto's friend
- Mahima Nambiar as Dr. Aishwarya (Aishu), Shabeer's love interest and Shinto ex-girlfriend
- Sangeeth Prathap as Hariharasudhan, an ethical hacker
- Kalabhavan Shajohn as Courier Babu, a kindhearted gangster
- Shyam Mohan as Shinto Varghese, Binto's elder brother
  - Dilan as young Shinto
- Bharath Bopanna as Ashish Bopanna, a dreaded gangster
- Binu Pappu as SI Tony "Sura" Francis
- Melvin G Babu as Yahiya
- Arun Raj as Bilal, Shinto's friend
- Ambareesh as Beljin, Binto's friend
- Malavika Vipin as Aishwarya Bopanna, Ashish's sister and Shinto's ex-girlfriend
- Reshmi Boban as Binto's and Shinto's mother
- Saji Puthuppally as Binto's and Shinto's father
- Vijay Ajith as Hariharasudhan's neighbour

== Release ==
The film released in theaters on 14 February 2025 coinciding with Valentine's Day. The film is started to premiere on SonyLIV on May 1, 2025. The satellite rights of the film is acquired by Asianet and will premiere on 5 September 2025 on occasion of Onam.

== Reception ==
Rohit Panikker of Times Now gave the film 3.5 stars and wrote "Bromance is a fun exploration of Gen Z's antics, problems and points of view narrated through the escapades of these interestingly-written characters. The film offers a fun ride though and though with plenty of laugh out loud moments and a narrative that's brisk and entertaining". Vivek Santhosh of Cinema Express gave the film 3 stars and wrote "A chaotic, fun-filled adventure with its share of flaws, Arun D Jose's film still manages to be a wild ride worth taking, especially for the scene-stealing Sangeeth Prathap".

Anna Mathews of The Times of India gave the film 2.5 stars and wrote "The story and the jokes don’t work all the time and you are faced with quite a few cringe moments". Anandu Suresh of The Indian Express gave the film 2.5 stars and wrote "While Mathew Thomas delivers a solid performance, demonstrating notable growth as an actor, Mahima Nambiar also shines, particularly in comedic scenes". Sanjay Ponnappa of India Today gave the film 2.5 stars and wrote "Arun D Jose's comedy film capitalises on the lead's desperation to find his missing brother, blending chaotic humour with a plot that starts off tight-knit but loosens as it progresses".
