= Moonwalk (film) =

Indian Malayalam language film

- Theatrical release poster
- Directed by: Vinod A. K.
- Written by: Vinod A. K. Mathew Varghese; Sunil Gopalakrishnan
- Produced by: Listin Stephen; Jasni Ahmed
- Starring: Anunath; Rishi Kainikkara; Siddharth B. Sujith Prabhakar; Arjun Manilal; Nikhil Sahapalan; Nainita Maria
- Cinematography: Ansar Shah
- Edited by: Deepu Joseph; Kiran Das
- Music by: Prashant Pillai
- Production companies: Magic Frames; Firewood Shows
- Distributed by: Magic Frames
- Release date: 30 May 2025 (Kerala)
- Running time: 116 minutes
- Country: India
- Language: Malayalam

Moonwalk is a 2025 Indian Malayalam-language film directed by Vinod A. K. in his directorial debut starring Anunath, Rishi Kainikkara, Siddharth B., Sujith Prabhakar and Arjun Manilal. The film was released on 30 May 2025. It's title references a dance figure popularized by Michael Jackson.

== Plot ==
This movie is set in the 80s. A group of friends gets inspired by Michael Jackson dance and style and tries to adopt his trend.

== Cast ==
- Sibi Kuttappan
- Anunath
- Rishi Kainikkara
- Siddharth B.
- Sujith Prabhakar
- Arjun Manilal
- Manoj Moses
- Appu Ashray
- Sanjana Doos
- Nainita Maria
- Meenakshi Raveendran
- Harshitha J Pisharody as Shahana
- Sreekant Murali
- Thushara Pillai
- Nikhil Sahapalan
- Thonnackal Jayachandran
- Mini I. G.
- Prem Shankar
- Sibi
- Suni
- Veenah Nair
- Kripa Cherian
- Hida

== Release ==
=== Theatrical ===
Moonwalk was shot in late 2020, and the post-production began in 2021. The teaser of the movie was released in 2020, but the release of the movie was delayed. Later in 2025, Lijo Jose Pellissery and Listin Stephen jointly brought the movie to the theatre. The film finally hit the theatres on 30 May 2025.

=== Home media ===
The digital streaming rights of the film were acquired by JioHotstar and started streaming from 8 July 2025. The satellite rights of the film were bought by Asianet.

== Reception ==
=== Critical reception ===
Gopika Is of The Times of India rated the film 3.5/5 stars and wrote, "Moonwalk is a film that stands out with its theme, performances and simplicity. It can even be called a slice-of-life film, focusing primarily on how dance transforms the lives of a few young men and their families. It also serves as a soulful tribute to Michael Jackson, the entertainer."

Anandu Suresh of The Indian Express rated the film 3.5/5 stars and wrote, "Vinod AK's dance drama serves as a reminder to prioritise theme, concept, story and script over the male lead’s (almost nonexistent) star value."

Vishal Menon of The Hollywood Reporter India wrote, "Moonwalk is a film that simply brims with life in the way that you've been transported straight into someone’s dearest memories. It's the best kind of nostalgia, made with so much love that you can't help but get with the beat."

S. R. Praveen of The Hindu wrote, "Moonwalk is a heartfelt tribute to a time period and to the breakdancing subculture that ruled the campuses and street venues during that time."

Cris of The News Minute wrote, "Moonwalk owes its title and inspiration to the American king of pop and dancer, Michael Jackson, who managed to sway the film’s protagonists in a faraway Kerala."

Vivek Santhosh of The New Indian Express rated the film 3.5/5 stars and wrote, "A heartfelt celebration of passion and resilience, the film captures the spirit of 80s dance and youth with sincerity, despite some familiar storytelling choices."

Divya P. of OTTPlay rated the film 3.5/5 stars and wrote, "Led by the spirited Sibi Kuttappan, Anunath, Manoj and the rest of the gang, director Vinod AK’s film remains entertaining and engaging from start to finish. Even if you are not an avid fan of breakdance or dance in general, Moonwalk is definitely worth your attention for its honest tale and lively performances."

Swathi P. Ajith of Onmanorama wrote, "Ultimately, Moonwalk isn't trying to be slick or overly choreographed. It's raw in parts, slow in others, but sincere throughout. And sometimes, that's enough."
