= Anugraheethan Antony =

2021 film directed by Prince Joy

- Theaterical release poster
- അനുഗ്രഹീതൻ ആന്റണി
- Directed by: Prince Joy
- Written by: Naveen T. Manilal
- Story by: Jishnu S. Ramesh; Aswin Prakash
- Produced by: M. Shijith & Thushar S.
- Starring: Sunny Wayne; Gouri G. Kishan; Siddique; Indrans; Suraj Venjaramoodu
- Cinematography: S. Selvakumar
- Edited by: Appu Bhattathiri
- Music by: Arun Muraleedharan
- Release date: 1 April 2021
- Country: India
- Language: Malayalam

Anugraheethan Antony (transl. Blessed Antony) is a 2021 Indian Malayalam-language romantic comedy fantasy film directed by Prince Joy (in his directorial debut). It stars Sunny Wayne and Gouri G. Kishan in lead roles, with Siddique, Indrans, Suraj Venjaramoodu and Baiju Santhosh in the supporting roles and also a dog with equal prominence. The film is produced by M. Shijith and Thushar S. under the banner of Lekshya Entertainments and Retconncinemas.

== Plot ==
The film starts with the death of a man named Antony, whose ghost watches over the funeral proceedings. His father's pet dog Rony is the only one who can see him, and he is unable to talk to or touch anyone else who is alive. On the first day following his death, he meets Antappan, an alcoholic who dies before cashing in his winning lottery ticket. Antony stays with Antappan on his last day as Antappan's family finds the ticket, and Antappan reveals that spirits will only be on the earth for 7 days.

The film then moves into a flashback, where Antony is an engineering drop out and has a photo studio of his own. Fed up with his son's antics, Antony's father, a retired schoolteacher, decides to buy 2 pet dogs, RUBY and RONY, to give him company – much to Antony's annoyance. Antony sells RUBY to another man without his father's permission. Meanwhile, Antony meets and falls in love with a girl named Sanjana, who seems to reciprocate his love. But just before confessing his love to her, he meets with an accident and dies.

Now his spirit wishes to convey the news of his death and his love for her, but is unable to do so. As he struggles to figure out a way to get this news to Sanjana, RONY faithfully keeps him company and follows him around. Eventually, on his 7th and last day, RONY brings a flyer announcing Antony's death to Sanjana, successfully revealing to her that he is dead. She visits his house and realizes his true love for her, thus fulfilling Antony's last wish. At the very end, Antony finds RUBY, who reunites with RONY. Together they return to his house to keep Antony's grieving father company, and look up at a star in the night sky who is implied to be Antony.

== Cast ==
- Sunny Wayne as Antony Varghese
- Gouri G. Kishan as Sanjana Madhavan
- Siddique as Varghese Maashu, Antony's Father
- Indrans as Madhavan, Sanjana's Father
- Suraj Venjaramoodu as Antappan
- Baiju Santhosh as Pichathipidi Dasappan
- Jaffar Idukki as Paulettan
- Manikandan R. Achari as Sudharmman
- Shine Tom Chacko as Sanjay Madhav, Sanjana's Brother
- Dain Davis as Roy
- Maala Parvathi as Thankamani
- Prasanth Alexander as Francis
- Muthumani as Shalet
- Lukman Avaran as Ramanan
- Nandan Unni as Laalan
- Harish Pengan as Bento Mash
- Aroop as Subheesh
- Seban as Naveen
- Naveen Calicut as Lottery Agent
- Biju Bernad as SI Bernad
- Naveen as Photographer Manoj
- Unni Karthikeyan as Unni
- Mish Shoji as Shiny
- Vedha Lakshmi as Kingini
- Melvin G Babu as Kuttan

== Production ==
=== Filming ===
Principal photography began in Jan 2019 in Thodupuzha with a pooja function in the presence of Midhun Manuel Thomas. Filming was completed on 2 August 2019.

== Soundtrack ==
Anugrahethan Antony

Soundtrack album by Arun Muraleedharan
- Released: 22 December 2020
- Recorded: 2019
- Genre: Feature film soundtrack
- Length: 9:04
- Language: Malayalam
- Label: Muzik247

The song is composed by Arun Muraleedharan on Malayalam, lyrics by Manu Manjith. The soundtrack album was distributed by Muzik247.

=== Track listing ===
No.	Title	Lyrics	Music	Singer	Length
1.	"Kamini..."	Manu Manjith	Arun Muraleedharan	K. S. Harisankar	3:59
2.	"Kamini Teaser"	Manu Manjith	Arun Muraleedharan	K. S. Harisankar	1:06
3.	"Bow Bow..."	Manu Manjith	Arun Muraleedharan	Anannya Nair, Kaushik Menon	3:59
4.	"Neeye Marayukayaano"	Manu Manjith	Arun Muraleedharan	Vineeth Sreenivasan, Haritha Balakrishnan	4:20
5.	"Neeye Teaser"	Manu Manjith	Arun Muraleedharan	Vineeth Sreenivasan, Haritha Balakrishnan	0:40
6.	"Ee Nadhi"	Manu Manjith	Arun Muraleedharan	Anne Amie, Adheef Muhamed	5:30
Total length:					19:34

== Release ==
=== Theatrical ===
The movie was released in theatres on 1 April 2021. Due to the second wave of COVID-19 in India, it only had a restricted theatre release.

=== Home media ===
The film started streaming on Amazon Prime Video from 23 July 2021. It was premiered on Mazhavil Manorama on 8 August 2021.
