= Adventures of Omanakuttan =

- Theatrical release poster
- Directed by: Rohith V. S.
- Written by: Rohith V. S. Sameer Abdul
- Produced by: Antony Binoy; Biju Pulickal; Binu Mampilly
- Starring: Asif Ali; Bhavana; Aju Varghese
- Cinematography: Akhil George
- Edited by: Livingston Mathew
- Music by: Arun Muraleedharan; Dawn Vincent
- Production company: 4 M Entertainments
- Distributed by: 4M Entertainments
- Release date: 19 May 2017
- Country: India
- Language: Malayalam

Adventures of Omanakuttan is a 2017 Indian Malayalam-language absurdist comedy film directed by Rohith V. S. (in his directorial debut). The story was conceived by Sameer Abdul and he wrote the screenplay along with the director. It stars Asif Ali, Bhavana, Aju Varghese and Saiju Kurup. It was produced by Antony Binoy and Biju Pulickal under the banner 4M Entertainments and features music composed by Arun Muraleedharan and Dawn Vincent.

The film was released on 19 May 2017 across Kerala.

== Plot ==
Omanakkuttan (Asif Ali) is an introverted sales executive working at a hair oil company named Clintonica owned by Chandran (Siddique), who used to be a snake oil salesman. During his time in the company, Omanakkuttan discovers a wide possibility that exists for chatting with women over phone through fake names and profiles and does so. Meanwhile, an SI (Srindaa Arhaan) whom he chats with posing as a police officer wants to see him for real. He dresses up as a police officer and comes to the venue of a music concert conducted by a musician named Sidharth (Rahul Madhav). He gets cold feet and runs away into the concert crowd, but not before the SI catches a glimpse of him. At the concert, Omanakkuttan sees Pallavi (Bhavana). Pallavi has come there to get in touch with Sidharth to get access to a bungalow for research purposes(Pallavi is a parapsychology research student who is trying to research about the existence of ghosts, etc.). At the end of the concert, Pallavi tries to call out to Sidharth and Sidharth asks Pallavi to pass her note-pad so he could give her his autograph. Pallavi finds that Sidharth has given his phone number too. But actually it was Omanakuttan who signed the note-pad and gave his number. They begin chatting over phone call. Pallavi does not know it is Omanakuttan with whom she chats and doesn't even mind him on the way. Omanakkuttan successfully continues chatting with Pallavi and several other women posing as different people from different backgrounds, while in real he is his shy and introverted self. One fateful day while returning late night from office, he is looted by a taxi driver and hit on his head and disposed in a dump yard, and wakes up to find that he has lost his memory. He forgets everything that has happened in his life so far, and even forgets his name. He has his phone but upon calling up in a few numbers, people address him with different names so he gets further confused. Stranded on the highway, he asks for lifts and one car stops and it is Pallavi inside. She takes him as a charity case for a favour without knowing it was with him she had been chatting all along. Omanakkuttan and Pallavi go on an adventure to find out who he really is or whether all of this is an act of his craft.

== Cast ==
- Asif Ali as Omanakkuttan / Jerry Thomas / Kubera / Michael Jackson / Manu / Rahul / Siddharth Iyer
- Bhavana as Pallavi Deva
- Aju Varghese as Shiva
- Siddique as Chandrasekhar
- Saiju Kurup as Philip Plamoodan
- Kalabhavan Shajon as Vinayak Hegde
- Rahul Madhav as Sidharth Iyer
- Firoz Najeeb as Chenkappa
- Aditi Ravi as Honey
- Srinda as Mallika
- Ardra Das as Shelvi
- Sreejay Narayanan as Taxi Driver
- Shivaji Guruvayoor as Sreedharan Nair
- Prasanth as Varadan
- Arya Rohit as Sumathi Chandrasekhar
- Adil Ibrahim as Sanju Wognum
- Shilpa Manjunath as Pallavi's Friend

== Production ==
Asif Ali was roped in to play the lead role. Bhavana was finalized for the female Lead. The shoot of the film began in 2015.

== Music ==
Adventures of Omanakkuttan

Soundtrack album by Arun Muraleedharan and Dawn Vincent
- Genre: Feature film soundtrack
- Language: Malayalam

Title	Singers	Lyrics
"Varminnal"	Haricharan	B. K. Harinarayanan
"Illamai"	Shakthisree Gopalan	B. K. Harinarayanan
"Enthanu Mone"	Anthony Dassan	Manu Manjith
"Karirulu (Kannada)"	Arun James	Gururaja Bhat Kadya
"Thaniye Thaniye"	Suchith Suresan, Charles Nazareth	B. K. Harinarayanan
"Tarara"	Yazin Nizar	Manu Manjith
