= Ennul Aayiram =

2016 Indian film by Krishna Kumar

- Theatrical release poster
- Directed by: Krishna Kumar
- Produced by: Delhi Ganesh
- Starring: Mahadevan; Mareena Michael Kurisingal; Swarupu; Shruti Yugal
- Cinematography: Athisaya Raj
- Edited by: Shanmugam Velusamy
- Music by: Gopi Sundar
- Production company: Om Ganesh Creations
- Release date: 22 April 2016
- Country: India
- Language: Tamil

Ennul Aayiram (transl. A thousand inside me) is a 2016 Indian Tamil-language thriller drama film written and directed by Krishna Kumar. It stars newcomers Mahadevan and Marina Michael with Vincent Asokan, Swarupu, R.S Shivaji, Shruti Yugal and Krishnamoorthy in supporting roles. The film, which has music composed by Gopi Sundar, was released on 22 April 2016.

== Cast ==
- Mahadevan as Ashok
- Marina Michael as Suhasini
- Shruti Yugal
- Vincent Asokan
- R. S. Shivaji as Sadasivam
- Swarupu Alias Karthic Shankar as Suhasini's Brother
- Ravi Raj Krishna
- Krishnamoorthy
- Annamalai Palaniappan as Senthil

== Production ==
In early 2015, the actor Delhi Ganesh chose to convert his theatre company Om Ganesh Creations into a production studio and launched a film starring his son, Mahadevan Ganesh, in the lead role. Titled Ennul Aayiram, the film featured newcomers with the Malayalam actress Marina Michael signed to play the leading female role. The idea of making a film first emerged after Maha was told a storyline by Krishna Kumar, an erstwhile assistant to the director A. L. Vijay, and Maha subsequently took the project to his father. Vincent Asokan was also signed to work on the film, ending his sabbatical from signing Tamil films, while Gopi Sunder was composed the film's music. Shooting was completed in 50 days in Chennai and Pondicherry.

Delhi Ganesh asked R. Madhavan to release a single online to promote the project, while Ganesh also convinced Kamal Haasan to release the film's audio soundtrack during February 2016.

== Release and reception ==
Ennul Aayiram was originally scheduled to release on 1 April 2016, but got postponed to 22 April. The Hindu wrote that "Ennul Aayiram exists almost just as an advertisement of his repertoire of skills". Malini Mannath of The New Indian Express opined that "Though not completely satisfactory in its take, Ennul Aayiram is a commendable effort from a debutant maker". A critic from The Times of India said that "Ennul Aayiram barely succeeds in keeping us hooked as the story progresses".
