= Melvin G Babu =

Indian actor

- Born: Mavelikkara, Kerala, India
- Occupation: Actor
- Years active: 2017–present

Melvin G Babu is an Indian actor and content creator who appears in the Malayalam Cinema. He is best known for portraying Kuttan in Anugraheethan Antony (2021), Eby Kuruvilla in Jo and Jo (2022) and Joyal in Oh My Darling (2023). He is also known as a content creator in the name FT Guys (Fayankara Talented Guys).

== Career ==
In 2021, Melvin started his film career by playing the character of Kuttan in the movie Anugraheethan Antony. He was praised for the timely comedies and witty counter dialogues in that film. In 2021, Melvin played Eby Kuruvilla, lead role in the film Jo and Jo which was released in theatres and Amazon Prime. Later in the same year he did the hero role as Joyal (Joel) in the film Oh My Darling opposite to Anikha Surendran which was also released in theatres and Amazon Prime. The movie was in trending list in Amazon Prime .

== Filmography ==
Year	Title	Role	Ref.
2021	Anugraheethan Antony	Kuttan	
2022	Jo and Jo	Eby Kuruvilla	
2023	Oh My Darling	Joyal	
2024	Thekku Vadakku	Friend	
2025	Bromance	Yahiya	
