= Shahad Nilambur =

Malayalam film director

Shahad Nilambur

Shahad Nilambur is an Indian film director who works primarily in Malayalam cinema. He made his feature directorial debut with Prakashan Parakkatte (2022), followed by Anuragam (2023) and Pradhama Drishtiya Kuttakkar (2026).

== Early life and career ==
Shahad grew up in Nilambur, Kerala. He developed an interest in filmmaking during his teenage years and began making short films while still in school. While studying in Plus One, he made his first short film, Motta. He later directed several short films under the banner Village Shades. His short film Oppana was selected as the best film at the 2020 Chetana Fest.

Shahad later moved to Kochi to pursue a career in the Malayalam film industry. In an interview with Malayala Manorama, he recalled his early struggles in the industry, including working in a hotel while pursuing opportunities in filmmaking. He subsequently worked in assistant and associate directing roles before moving into feature-film direction.

== Assistant and associate director ==
Before becoming a feature-film director, Shahad worked as an assistant and associate director on several Malayalam films. His credited work includes Adi Kapyare Kootamani (2015), Popcorn (2016), Crossroad (2017), Pretham Undu Sookshikkuka (2017), Love Action Drama (2019) and Uriyadi (2020).

He was credited as an assistant director on Adi Kapyare Kootamani, Popcorn and Crossroad, as an associate director on Pretham Undu Sookshikkuka and Love Action Drama, and as chief associate director on Uriyadi.

According to Malayala Manorama, Shahad's experience working in these roles helped him develop professional relationships within the Malayalam film industry before he moved into feature-film direction.

== Filmography ==
=== As director ===
Year	Film	Role
2022	Prakashan Parakkatte	Director
2023	Anuragam	Director
2026	Pradhama Drishtiya Kuttakkar	Director

=== Assistant and associate director ===
Year	Film	Role
2015	Adi Kapyare Kootamani	Assistant director
2016	Popcorn	Assistant director / Second assistant director
2017	Crossroad	Assistant director
2017	Pretham Undu Sookshikkuka	Associate director
2019	Love Action Drama	Associate director
2020	Uriyadi	Chief associate director
