= Kala (2021 film) =

2021 film by Rohith V. S.

- Theatrical release poster
- Directed by: Rohith V. S.
- Written by: Yadhu Pushpakaran; Rohith V. S.
- Produced by: Siju Mathew; Navis Xaviour; Tovino Thomas; Rohith V. S.; Akhil George
- Starring: Tovino Thomas; Moor; Lal Paul; Divya Pillai; Pramod Velliyanad
- Cinematography: Akhil George
- Edited by: Chaman Chakko
- Music by: Dawn Vincent
- Production companies: Juvis Productions; Tovino Thomas Productions; Adventure Company
- Distributed by: Century Release
- Release dates: 25 March 2021; (India & GCC)
- Running time: 130 minutes
- Country: India
- Language: Malayalam
- Budget: ₹ 1.2 Crore
- Box office: ₹ 3 Crore

Kala (transl. Weed) is a 2021 Indian Malayalam-language action thriller film directed by Rohith V. S. and written by Yadhu Pushpakaran and Rohith V. S. It stars Tovino Thomas and Moor in the lead roles. and features Lal and Divya Pillai in supporting roles. Chaman Chakko is the film's editor while Akhil George handles the cinematography. Dawn Vincent composed the background score and did the audiography. The film is produced by Siju Mathew and Navis Xaviour under Juvis Productions and co-produced by Tovino Thomas, Rohith V. S., and Akhil George under Adventure Company and Tovino Thomas Productions.

== Plot ==
Shaji is living in an isolated farmhouse in Palakkad with his wife, Vidya Shaji, his young son, and his Cane Corso black dog. He is in debt, due to the failure of his farming. His wealthy father, Raveendran, who had entrusted him to take care of the farming, has lost hope in him, now considers him useless, and scolds him often. To manage the work in the farmland and to steal some of his father's peppercorns to clear his debt, Shaji hires a few Tamil workers through an acquaintance. Along with her brother, Vidya visits her parents' place to take a break from her routine life for a while. As the workers begin working, an eerie atmosphere creeps in.

Shaji spots one of the worker boys spying on him and catches him. He learns that in a previous encounter, he had killed the boy's beloved dog without his knowledge, and the boy has now returned to avenge his loss. It is also revealed that all of the Tamil workers were once owners of the farmland. The land was then forcefully taken over by Raveendran. Shaji requests the boy to forget the incident and offers to buy him a new dog. But the boy is determined to seek revenge and swears to kill Shaji's dog. Shaji loses his temper and a fearsome fight ensues between them fighting for survival and vengeance.

When it starts raining, Shaji realizes that he has to shift peppercorn. So, he locks the boy in a room and rushes dripping in blood. He unloads the peppercorn sacks outside the storage shed. When he returns to the room, he finds the boy missing. He gets furious when he sees the boy setting the peppercorn on fire. They continue fighting and the boy easily gets the upper hand, making Shaji run for his life. Finally, the boy makes Shaji feel the pain of his loss and is satisfied to have achieved his vengeance successfully. After this, the boy walks away with Shaji's dog happily.

== Cast ==
- Tovino Thomas as Shaji
- Moor as a Tamil migrant worker
- Divya Pillai as Vidya
- Lal as Raveendran
- Pramod Veliyanad as Mani Ashan
- Sreejith Ravi as Stephen, Shaji's friend
- Bibin Perumbillikunnel as Anil

== Production ==
On 11 July 2020, Tovino Thomas announced that his next project titled Kala. The pooja function of the film was done on 5 September 2020 and the principal photography began on September 7. On 7 October 2020, Tovino was hospitalized after getting injured while filming an action sequence at Kolenchery. The filming resumed on 18 December 2020 after he recovered from the injuries. The filming completed on 30 December 2020.

== Music ==
The title track of the film Vanyam, penned by Vinayak Sasikumar and composed by Dawn Vincent, was released on 27 March 2021 on Juvis Production's YouTube channel.

Track	Song	Lyricist	Composer	Singer(s)
1	Vanyam	Vinayak Sasikumar	Dawn Vincent	Amrita Jayakumar, Chathan Moopan, Kariyan Moopan

== Release ==
=== Theatrical ===
Kala was released theatrically on 25 March 2021.

=== Home media ===
Kala started streaming on Amazon Prime Video and Saina Play from 24 May 2021. The Tamil version of the film titled Kala started streaming on Aha Tamil platform on 4 June 2021.

== Reception ==
=== Critical response ===
On the review aggregator website Rotten Tomatoes, 100% of 5 critics' reviews are positive, with an average rating of 7.3/10.

Vaisakh Vamadevan from The Update rated film 3 out of 5 and stated that "Kala offers a new visual experience, where technical sides was at top notch" Baradwaj Rangan of Film Companion wrote "Kala is beautifully made. This is a very stylized film and the sound design by Dawn Vincent complements that beautifully. Action choreography is another major highlight as well as Akhil George's cinematography which alternates between stillness and action."
