= Samadhana Pusthakam =

2024 Indian Malayalam-language film

- Directed by: Raveesh Nath
- Written by: Raveesh Nath; Arun D. Jose; Sivan C.P.
- Produced by: Nissar Mangalasseri
- Starring: Siju Wilson; Mathew Thomas
- Cinematography: Satheesh Kurup
- Edited by: Chaman Chakko
- Music by: 4 Musics
- Production company: Sigma Stories
- Distributed by: Sigma Stories through Valluvanaadan Cinema Company
- Release date: 19 July 2024
- Country: India
- Language: Malayalam

Samadhana Pusthakam (transl. Book of Peace) is a 2024 Indian Malayalam film written and directed by Raveesh Nath featuring Siju Wilson, Leona Lishoy and Mathew Thomas

== Cast ==
- Siju Wilson as Alex Xavier
- Leona Lishoy as Principal Sheena Antony
- Mathew Thomas as Paranki Praveesh
- Veena Nair as Rema
- James Elias as Lakshmi mash
- Meghanadan as Poduval mash
- Jose P Raffel as Sanal mash
- Kalabhavan Haneef as Moidu
- V.K. Sreeraman as MLA Sreedharan
- Sreelakshmi Santhosh as Indhu
- Mahima Jiji as Indhu's friend
- Yohan as Abdu
- Dhanush as Appu
- Balu as Sudheesh
- Abhinand as Najas
- Nebish Benson
- Irfaan as Muthu
- Trinity Elsa Prakash as Riya
- Pramod Veliyanadu as Bookstall Chellappan
- Shailaja Ambu as Jalaja
- Drupath Krishna as Kunjunni
- Anagha as Smitha
- Manoranjan as Bakery owner
- Akhilanath as Mridula teacher

== Music ==
The music is arranged and composed by 4 Musics

Samadhana Pusthakam

Soundtrack album by 4 Musics
- Released: 19 July 2024
- Length: 14:36
- Language: Malayalam

Track listing
No.	Title	Music	Singer(s)	Length
1.	"Punya Pusthakame"	4 Musics	Anthony Daasan, Santhosh Varma	3:26
2.	"Pandoru Naattiloru"	4 Musics	Bhadra Rajin, Titto P. Thankachen	3:27
3.	"Ival Arike"	4 Musics	Karthik, Jis Joy	3:49
4.	"Uyir Udainthu Pokum"	4 Musics	Jim Jacob, Priyesh	3:49
Total length:				14:36
