= Mareena Michael Kurisingal =

Indian actress and model

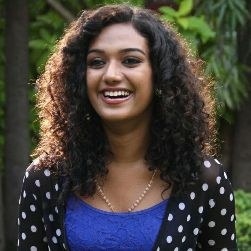
- Other name: Raksha
- Occupations: Actress; Model
- Years active: 2014 – present

Mareena Michael Kurisingal is an Indian actress and model who appears predominantly in Malayalam films.

== Career ==
She is best known for her role in the 2017 film Aby opposite Vineeth Sreenivasan. Earlier Mareena has appeared in films like Happy Wedding and Amar Akbar Anthony. She has played lead roles in Mumbai Taxi and Ennul Aayiram.

== Filmography ==
=== Films ===
- Note: all films are in Malayalam, unless otherwise noted.

Year	Title	Role	Notes
2014	Vaayai Moodi Pesavum	Sathish's love interest	Bilingual film Simultaneously shot in Tamil and Malayalam
2014	Samsaaram Aarogyathinu Haanikaram	Sathish's love interest	Bilingual film Simultaneously shot in Tamil and Malayalam
2015	Mumbai Taxi	Nandhita	
2015	Amar Akbar Anthony	Angel	
2015	Haram	Neeraja	
2015	Nellikka	Madhubandhi	
2016	Happy Wedding	Sophiya	
2016	Ennul Aayiram	Suhasini	Tamil film
2017	Chunkzz	Sherin	
2017	Aby	Anumol Xavier	
2018	Ennaalum Sarath..?	Malavika Sreekanth	
2018	Naam	Maya	
2018	Era	Kavya	
2018	Angarajyathe Gymmanmar	Maria	
2019	Kumbarees	Maria John	
2019	Vattamesha Sammelanam	Actress	
2019	Naan Petta Makan	Student Leader	
2019	Vikruthi	Bella	
2019	Oru Caribbean Udayippu	Meenakshi	
2020	Mariyam Vannu Vilakkoothi	Herself	Special appearance in the promo song
2021	Cheraathukal	Home Nurse	In the segment Veyil Veezhave
2021	Pidikittapulli	Christy	Direct OTT Release on Jio Cinemas
2022	Randu	Rubina	
2022	Member Rameshan 9aam Ward	Shiny	
2022	Twenty One Gms	ASI Abhirami	
2022	Padma	Nila	
2022	Shubhadhinam		
2022	Section 306 IPC		
2023	Kurukkan	Neenu	
2023	Thaal	Viswalakshmi	
2024	Vivekanandan Viralanu	Aisha	
2024	Njan Kandatha Sare		
2025	Koodal	Hima	
2025	Jagala	Kunjaathu	
2025	Behindd	Neena	
2025	Ambalamukkile Visheshangal	Priya	
2026	Revolver Rinko		
2026	Maduramee Jeevitham	TBA	

=== Short films ===
Year	Film	Role	Notes
2016	Unnale Unnale	Lover	Tamil Musical video
2016	Idam		Musical video
2016	Black Hole	Reena	Short film
2016	Athirukalkkum Appuram	Meera	Short film
2017	Bluemoon Day	Angel	Short film
2017	Break Up Party	Jazmine	Short film
2018	Jeevanum Nidhiyum	Dr. Nidhi	Short film
2018	Nirvedham	Dr. Sajitha	Short film
2020	A Live Story	Laya	Short film
2020	Maya	Maya	Short film
2020	Psycho in Love	Meera N Joseph	Short film
2021	DK	Rhea Menon	Short film
