= Thekku Vadakku =

Indian comedy drama film

- Theatrical release poster
- Directed by: Prem Shankar
- Screenplay by: S. Hareesh
- Story by: Ragesh Narayanan
- Produced by: Anjana Philip; Philip Zacharia; V. A. Shrikumar
- Starring: Suraj Venjaramoodu; Vinayakan
- Cinematography: Suresh Rajan
- Edited by: Kiran Das
- Music by: Sam C. S.
- Release date: 4 October 2024
- Country: India
- Language: Malayalam

Thekku Vadakku is a 2024 Indian Malayalam-language satirical comedy-drama film starring Suraj Venjaramoodu and Vinayakan in leading roles. The film is about a bitter rivalry between a retired KSEB overseer and a rice mill owner fighting for a land's ownership.

== Plot ==
Two senior citizens are involved in a long-running legal fight over a piece of land, but the feud attains bigger dimensions

== Cast ==
- Suraj Venjaramoodu as Shankunni
- Vinayakan as Madhavan
- Melvin G Babu as Friend
- Vineeth Vishwam as Shinoy
- Shameer Khan as Petti
- Kottayam Ramesh as Paul
- Varun Dhara as Shankunni's son-in-law
- Anishma Anilkumar as Devukutty
- Merin Jose
- Balan Palakkal
- James Parakkal
- Sudheer
- R. J. Murugan
- Nandini Gopalakrishnan
- Sneha Vijay
- Nidhinya
- Manjushri
- Sheetal Joseph
- Jayaraj
- Ashok Narayanan
- Jobish
- Sathyan
- Sathyan
- Shinil K Jayan
- Rakesh Ushar
- Ratheesh Venjaramoodu
- Nimisha Ashok

== Music ==
The music for the film was composed by Sam C. S. with lyrics written by Lakshmi Shrikumar and Rafeeq Ahamed.

Track listing
No.	Title	Writer(s)	Singer(s)	Length
1.	"Appi Appi (Vettum Kuthum Illa)"	Lakshmi Sreekumar	Jassie Gift	4:06
2.	"Kallaano Mannaano"	Rafeeq Ahamed	K. J. Jeemon	5:15
3.	"Kasa Kasa"	Lakshmi Sreekumar	Anthony Daasan, Sam C. S., K. Yadu Krishnan, Praseeda Kalarikkal	3:53
