= Aswin Jose =

Indian film actor

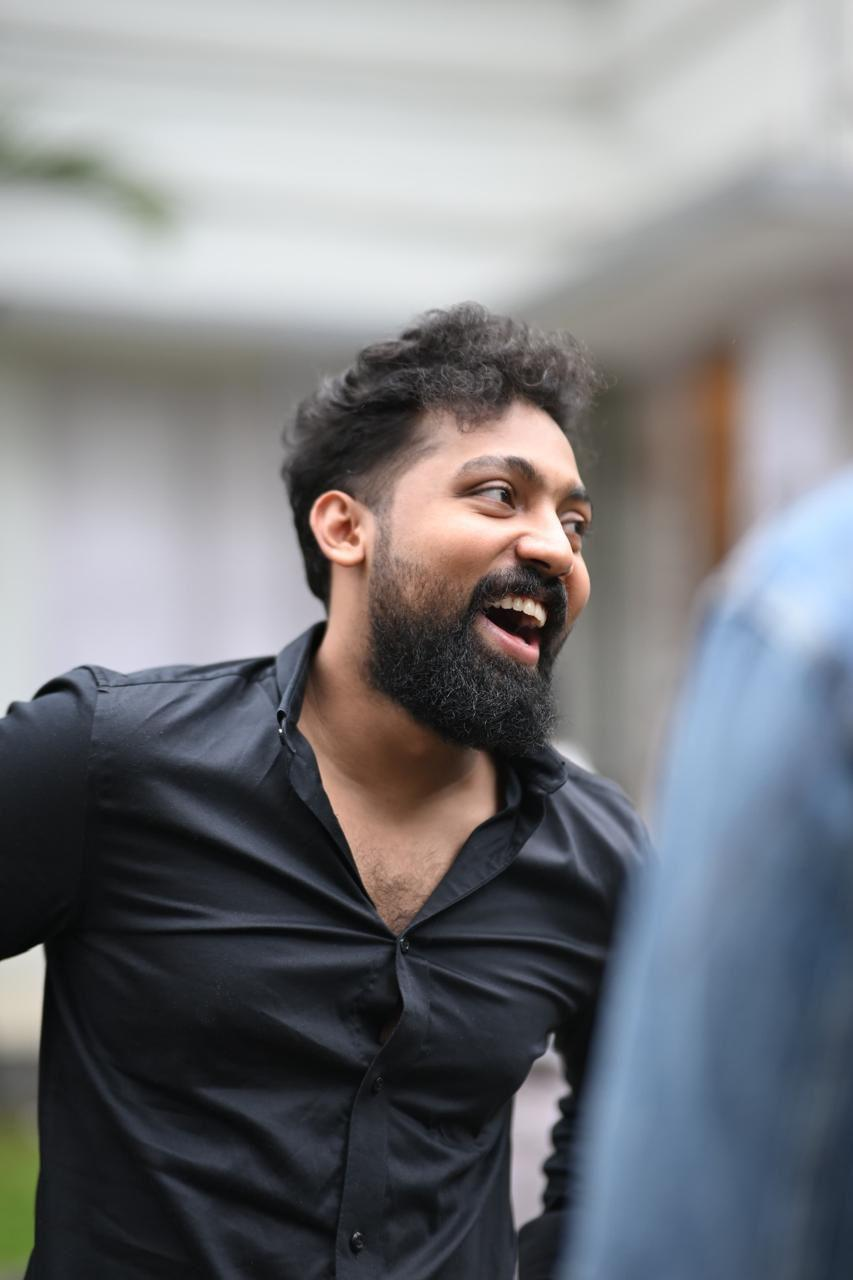
- Aswin Jose, Malayalam film actor in 2025.
- Occupation: Actor
- Years active: 2018-present

Aswin Jose is an Indian actor and filmmaker who works predominantly in the Malayalam film industry.

== Career ==
Aswin made his debut in acting through the Malayalam film Queen in 2018. He gained wider attention for his role in the same movie. The song "Nenjinakath Lalettan" and the performance of Aswin were noticeable in the movie.

After Queen, he acted in a lead role in Harisree Ashokan's debut directorial movie An International Local Story (2018). Kumbarees was his other movie released on 23 August 2019. He made his solo lead debut with Anuragam for which he worked as the story writer.

== Personal life ==
He married Feba Johnson on 17 May 2023.

== Filmography ==
Key
†	Denotes film or TV productions that have not yet been released

Year	Title	Role	Notes	Ref
2018	Queen	Muneer	Debut Movie	
2019	An International Local Story	Yadhu		
2019	Kumbarees	Shambhu		
2019	Adhyarathri	Young Satheesh		
2022	Prakashan Parakkatte	Sohaib		
2023	Anuragam	Aswin	Also story writer	
2024	Paalum Pazhavum	Sunil		
2025	Prince and Family	Musthaq		
2025	Oru Ronaldo Chithram			

=== Short film ===
Year	Title	Role	Ref.
2021	Colour Padam	Dileep	
