= Jo and Jo =

2022 Malayalam film by Arun D Jose

Jo & Jo
- Theatrical release poster
- Directed by: Arun D. Jose
- Written by: Arun D. Jose; Raveesh Nath
- Produced by: Harris Desom; Adarsh Narayan; P. B. Anish; Anumod Bose
- Starring: Nikhila Vimal; Naslen; Mathew Thomas
- Cinematography: Ansar Shah
- Edited by: Chaman Chakko
- Music by: Govind Vasantha
- Production companies: Imagin Cinemas; Signature Studios
- Distributed by: Icon Cinemas
- Release date: 13 May 2022
- Running time: 133 minutes
- Country: India
- Language: Malayalam
- Box office: ₹16 crores

Jo & Jo is a 2022 Indian Malayalam-language mystery comedy film directed by Arun D. Jose in his directorial debut. The film is co-produced by Imagine Cinemas and Signature Studios. It is co-written by Arun D. Jose and Raveesh Nath. The film stars Mathew Thomas and Nikhila Vimal in the title roles, with Naslen and Melvin G Babu in the other lead roles. The music is composed by Govind Vasantha. The plot revolves around the lives of a group of youngsters in a village during the COVID-19 pandemic.

The film was released on 13 May 2022 to positive reviews from critics and became a super hit at box office.

== Plot ==
Set during the COVID-19 lockdown in Kerala, the plot revolves around two siblings, Jomol and Jomon (the titular Jo and Jo). Jomol is the elder child of Baby and Lilly and Jomon is her younger brother. Both are attending their college classes online, due to the pandemic. Jomol also conducts a tuition class for students at home. They are constantly at odds with each other due to Jomol's view that Jomon is lazy and has it easier due to being male and the younger child in the family. Jomon spends most of his free time with his two close friends Manoj Sundaran and Eby Kuruvilla. They spend their time secretly smoking and fishing at a local canal. Sundaran has an unrequited crush on Jomol while Eby has a girlfriend Nimmy in another village. He constantly tries to meet her but find it difficult due to the lockdowns in place.

Jomol with her keen perceptive skills exposes Jomon's every little mischief to their parents. All of these create a rift between the siblings. One day, Jomon finds a love letter addressed to "Jo" in their mailbox. Assuming it was meant for Jomol, he makes it his goal to find out Jomol's secret lover and seeks help from Sundaran and Eby for this. Jomol also sees Jomon with the letter and assumes that the love letter was meant for him and resolves to similarly find who the writer was. She seeks help from her grandmother Annamma who lives with them.

Assuming that the author of the love letter drove a green motorcycle, Jomon and his friends attempt to find a similar vehicle. They eventually find two green motorcycles but realize that they were mistaken both times. They also track Jomol's phone so that they can find more evidence through her online chats. Jomol, similarly, is now keenly focused on Jomon's activities and finds and exposes his smoking to their parents. This results in an escalation of their conflict and Jomon angrily decides to leave home. Eventually it is discovered that the author of the note was one of Jomol's tuition students who wrote it for Jomon, unbeknownst to him. Realizing their mistaken assumptions about each other, the two siblings make up.

== Cast ==
- Nikhila Vimal as Jomol Palathara, Jomon's elder sister (Jo)
- Mathew Thomas as Jomon Palathara, Jomol's young brother (Jo)
- Naslen as Manoj Sundaran, Jomon's friend and Jomol's one side love interest
- Melvin G Babu as Eby Kuruvilla, Jomon's friend
- Sagar Surya as Tuttu (Parishkaari)
- Johny Antony as Baby Palathara, Jo & Jo's father
- Sminu Sijo as Lillykutty Palathara, Jo & Jo's mother
- Leena Antony as Annamma Palathara
- Hareesh Pengan as Ajith, Manoj's elder uncle
- Saniya Babu as Nimmy, Eby's girlfriend
- Santhosh Laxman as Kadakkaran
- Sameera Sabu as Indu (Captain Marvel), Jomon's girlfriend in WhatsApp
- Anjana Ashokan as Jomon's Wedding girl (Ellolam Thari song)
- Binu Adimali as Member Shibu
- Sreejith Ravi as SI Sudheer
- Kalabhavan Shajon as Saji, Indu's father (cameo appearance)

== Production ==
The film was announced in mid-September. Its first look poster was revealed by actor Prithviraj Sukumaran on 16 October, Mathew's birthday.

== Music ==
The music is composed by Govind Vasantha while the lyrics are co-written by Suhail Koya and Titto Thankachan.

== Release ==
=== Theatrical ===
The film was released in theatres on 13 May 2022.

=== Home media ===
The digital rights of the film were acquired by Amazon Prime Video and started streaming it on 10 June 2022.

== Reception ==
=== Critical reception ===
The film received positive response from critics. Sanjith Sidhardhan of OTTPlay gave the film 3/5 stars and wrote "The script is replete with references and incidents during the lockdown that most of the youth as well as parents could connect with. And these evoke plenty of laughter, especially when it comes in the form of banter between three college students, who are stuck home." Cris of The News Minute gave the film 2.5/5 stars and wrote "Film on sibling rivalry had promise, but failed to deliver."

Deepa Soman of Onmanorama wrote "All the actors, be it Naslen, Mathew, Nikhila, Johny Antony, Sminu or those doing the supporting characters, have given their all to the wonderfully relatable everyday characters making this movie a safe bet as a weekend watch." S. R. Praveen of The Hindu wrote "The entire movie gets a treatment similar to that of some light-hearted web series, but not all of the attempted jokes land effectively." Sajin Shrijith of The New Indian Express gave the film 4/5 stars.
