= Arun Muraleedharan =

Indian composer

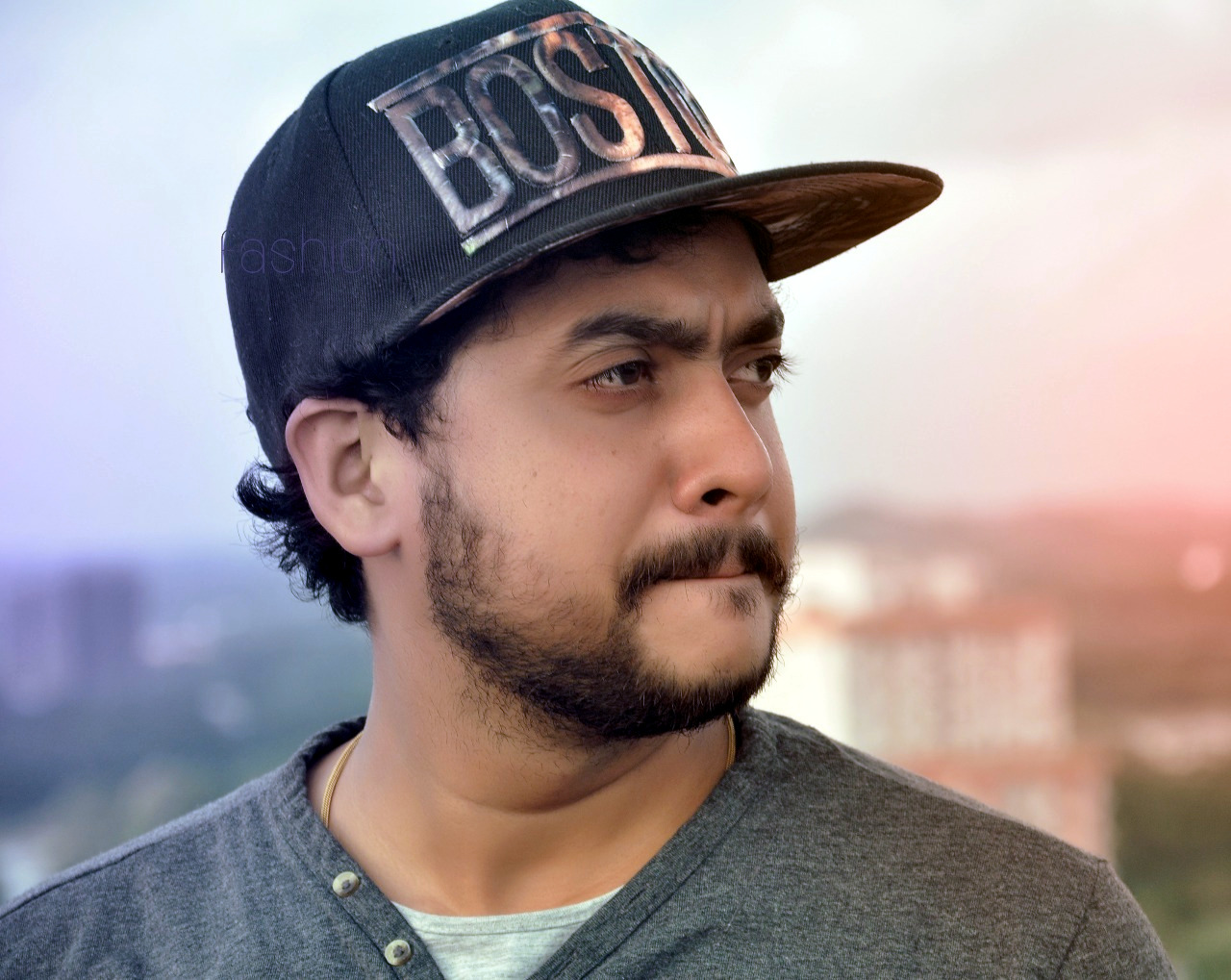
- Born: Arun Muraleedharan; 1989 (age 36–37); Angamali, India
- Other name: Arun

Arun Muraleedharan (born 1989) is an Indian composer who made his debut through the 2016 film Happy Wedding. His second film was the Adventures of Omanakuttan directed by Rohith V.S.

== Personal life ==
After completing his schooling at S. N. V. Sanskrit Higher Secondary School, Paravur, Arun joined Sreesankara University in Kalady, graduating in music.

== Career ==
Arun Muraleedharan started his career in music composing first for the album Neelambari, while studying at college. Happy Wedding is his debut as a Music director. Best known for his hit song Aval from Kakshi: Amminippilla (2019) and Kamini from Anugraheethan Antony (2021) sung by K. S. Harisankar.

== Discography ==
=== As Music Director ===
==== Films ====
Year	Title	Notes
2016	Happy Wedding	
2017	Adventures of Omanakuttan	
2018	Avaykatha	Kannada film
2019	Kakshi: Amminippilla	
2020	Anugraheethan Antony	
2023	Nadhikalil Sundari Yamuna	
2024	Andhakaara	
2024	Thrayam	

==== Short films ====
- Whyga
- RIM
- Maniyara
- Tale of Mathew Mannadan
- Who am I
- Engane Thudangum
- Kattapoka
