= Paalum Pazhavum =

- Theatrical release poster
- Directed by: V. K. Prakash
- Written by: Ashish Rajani Unnikrishnan
- Produced by: Sameer Sait; Vinoth Unnidan
- Starring: Meera Jasmine; Aswin Jose
- Cinematography: Rahul Deep
- Edited by: Praveen Prabhakar
- Music by: Songs: Sachin Balu; Joel Johns; Justin-Uday; Score: Gopi Sundar
- Production company: 2 Creative Minds
- Release date: 23 August 2024
- Running time: 145 minutes
- Country: India
- Language: Malayalam

Paalum Pazhavum (transl. Milk and banana) is a 2024 Indian Malayalam-language drama film directed by V. K. Prakash and written by Ashish Rajani Unnikrishnan. Produced under 2 Creative Minds, it stars Meera Jasmine and Aswin Jose. The film was theatrically released on 23 August 2024. Paalum Pazhavum started streaming on Saina Play on 20 December 2024.

== Cast ==
- Meera Jasmine as Sumi S.
- Aswin Jose as Sunil P. Tamarakshan
- Shanthi Krishna as Sumithra
- Rachana Narayanankutty as Revathi
- Ashokan as Raghavan
- Maniyanpilla Raju as Tamarakshan
- Nisha Sarang as Janani
- Mithun Ramesh as Sumesh
- Sumesh Chandran as Peethambaran
- Adil Ibrahim as Suku
- Shinu Shyamalan
- Thushara Pillai as Bindu
- Anjana Appukuttan as Bank customer
- Rajasenan as Devu
- Shameer Khan as Sharath PT
- Franco Francis
- Vineeth Ramachandran
- Ranjith Manambarakkat
- Sandhya Rajendran
- Atul Ram Kumar
- Pranav Yesudas
- R J Sooraj
- Babu Sebastian

== Production ==
The film was announced in February 2024. The filming took place in Kochi.

== Music ==
Palum Pazhavum

Soundtrack album by Sachin Balu, Joel Johns, Justin-Uday
- Released: 23 August 2024
- Genre: Feature film soundtrack
- Length: 24:21
- Language: Malayalam
- Label: Panorama Music South

Official audio
- Palum Pazhavum(Audio Jukebox) on YouTube

The music for the film's soundtrack album was composed by Sachin Balu, Joel Johns and Justin-Uday. The background score is composed by Gopi Sundar.

Track listing
No.	Title	Lyrics	Music	Singer(s)	Length
1.	"Kandu Njan"	Suhail Koya	Sachin Balu	Mubas	3:18
2.	"Ene Kone"	Titto P Thankachen	Joel Johns	Zia Ul Haq	3:33
3.	"Palum Pazhavum"	Nidheesh Naderi	Justin-Uday	Abin Thomas	2:06
4.	"Njan Ozhuki"	Vivek Muzhakkunnu	Sachin Balu	Kapil Kapilan, Bhadra Rajin	3:44
5.	"Kadu Chutti"	Nidheesh Naderi	Justin-Uday	Ashokan	3:10
6.	"Doorangal"	Suhail Koya	Sachin Balu	Sachin Balu, Bhadra Rajin	4:30
7.	"Kadavule"	Suhail Koya	Gopi Sundar	Pranavam Sasi	4:00
Total length:					24:21

== Reception ==
Vignesh Madhu of The New Indian Express gave the film 3/5 stars. A critic from The Times of India gave the film three stars out of five. Rohit Panikker of Times Now rated the film 3 1/2 stars out of 5 stars.
