= Oh My Darling (film) =

2023 Indian Malayalam romantic comedy film

- Theatrical release poster
- Directed by: Alfred D' Samuel
- Written by: Jineesh K. Joy
- Produced by: Manoj Sreekanta
- Starring: Anikha Surendran; Melvin G Babu
- Cinematography: Ansar Shah
- Edited by: Lijo Paul
- Music by: Shaan Rahman
- Production company: Ashtree Ventures
- Release date: 24 February 2023
- Running time: 144 minutes
- Country: India
- Language: Malayalam

Oh My Darling is a 2023 Indian Malayalam-language romantic comedy film directed by Alfred D' Samuel and produced by Manoj Sreekanta under the banner Ash Tree Ventures. The film stars Anikha Surendran and Melvin G Babu, along with Johny Antony, Manju Pillai, Vijayaraghavan, Nandu and Archana Menon.

The screenplay and dialogue are written by Jineesh K. Joy. The music is composed by Shaan Rahman, while Ansar Shah has been roped in as the cinematographer and Lijo Paul has done the editing. The film was released in theatres on 24 February 2023.

== Cast ==
- Anikha Surendran as Jenny / Jasmine (voice provided by Ajanya Sanju)
- Melvin G Babu as Joel
- Mukesh as Jacob
- Lena as Nancy, Jenny's and Jasmine's mother
- Johny Antony as Peter
- Manju Pillai as Mereetta
- Vijayaraghavan as Alex
- Nandu as Mathews
- Shaju Sreedhar as Father Sabumon
- Binu Adimali as Subhramanyan
- Archana Menon as Sicily
- Fukru as Jettish Kumar
- Dain Davis as Kripanand
- Ganapathi S. Poduval as Josemon, Jasmine's husband(Cameo)
- Pauly Valson as Mariyamma (Cameo)

== Production ==
The principal photography started on 17 August 2022. The film noted as debut for director and first film as a protagonist for Anikha Surendran. The first look of the film was released by Mammootty and second look was released on 16 October 2022. Later, Teaser released on 6 February 2023 and trailer released on 12 February 2023 with the film theatrical release date 24 February 2023. South Korean singer Linda Quero croons 'Darling’ song for the film.

== Reception ==
The film was released 24 February 2023 in theatres. A critic from OTTplay gave 2 stars out of 5 and stated that "If you were attracted by the K-drama vibes that Oh My Darling's trailer and teasers gave off, this movie will be a major letdown." Dhanya K Vilayil critic of Indian Express wrote that "Though 'Oh My Darling' tries to talk about a topic that Malayalam cinema has not talked about yet, even that twist fails to bring the film closer to the audience" and gave 2 out of 5. Critic from Mathrubhumi and ManoramaOnline gave a mixed review.
