= An International Local Story =

- Directed by: Harisree Ashokan
- Written by: Ranjith; Eban; Saneesh
- Produced by: M. Shijith
- Starring: Rahul Madhav; Aswin Jose; Deepak Parambol; Dharmajan Bolgatty; Bijukuttan
- Cinematography: Alby Antony
- Edited by: Ratheesh Raj
- Music by: Gopi Sunder; Nadirshah; Arunraj
- Production company: S – Square Cinemas
- Distributed by: Kalasangham Films
- Release date: 1 March 2019
- Country: India
- Language: Malayalam

An International Local Story is a 2019 Indian Malayalam-language comedy film directed by Harisree Ashokan. The film is about the friendship between five friends and features Rahul Madhav, Aswin Jose, Deepak Parambol, Dharmajan Bolgatty, Bijukuttan, Surabhi Santosh, Mamitha Baiju, Manoj K. Jayan and Tini Tom in substantial roles.

The music was composed by Gopi Sundar, Nadirshah and Arun Raj. Songs were written by Rajeev Alunkal, Hari Narayanan, and Dinu Mohan. The film was released on 1 March 2019.

== Cast ==
- Rahul Madhav as Rahul
- Aswin Jose as Yadhu
- Deepak Parambol as Mahesh
- Manoj K. Jayan as Shivan
- Tini Tom as Krishnan
  - Ijaaz Ebrahim as Young Krishnan
- Dharmajan Bolgatty as Kunjaro
- Bijukuttan as Sinthappan
- Harisree Ashokan as Ayyappan Nair
- Surabhi Santosh as Lachu
- Mamitha Baiju as Devika
- Suresh Krishna as Sketch Roni Kuttan
- Jubil Rajan P Dev as Mandan Gunda
- Nandu as Madhavan Nair
- Shobha Mohan as Vilasini
- Salim Kumar as MLA Joseph Manavalan
- Kalabhavan Shajon as Sugunan
- John Kaippallil as Arjun
- Parvathi T. as Nirmala
- Kunjan as Rahul's father
- Baiju as SI Mannavendran
- Innocent as Parameshwaran Panikkar
- Kulappulli Leela as Mannavendran's mother
- Kalabhavan Rahman
- Pauly Valsan as Kunjaro's mother
- Anjana Appukuttan
- Asha Nair as Radha
- Mafia Sasi as Vatti Sasi
- Abu Salim as ASI Hamsa
- Jaffar Idukki as Srikandan
- Manikuttan – Special appearance in song
- Remya Panicker
- Kalabhavan Haneef as Constable Moideen
- Eloor George as Antappan
- Binu Adimali as Jose
- Sasankan Mayyanad as assistant
- Kollam Sudhi as poovalan
- Arjun Ashokan as Photographer (cameo appearance)
- A. M. Ariff as himself
- Hariprashanth M G as Steve Carla

== Production ==
An International Local Story was the directorial debut of actor Harisree Ashokan. It was produced by M. Shijith under the banner of S – Square Cinemas. The principal photography began on 10 September 2018 in Ernakulam. The film is a combination of suspense, comedy, drama, friendship and love.

== Soundtrack ==
The soundtrack consists three songs composed by Arun Raj and Gopi Sunder.

Track listing
No.	Title	Lyrics	Music	Singer(s)	Length
1.	"Malayude Melekavil"	Rajeev Alunkal	Nadirshah	Afsal	3:31
2.	"Pattanam Mareettum"	Dinu Mohan	Arun Raj	Arjun Ashokan,	3:15
3.	"Kali Katta Local Aane"	Dinu Mohan	Arun Raj	Anwar Sadath, Antony Dhasan	3:49
4.	"Athmavil Peyyum"	Hari Narayanan	Gopi Sunder	Swetha Mohan, Hari Narayanan	4:41

== Reception ==
The Times of India wrote in its review "The comedy dialogues are quite tacky and unentertaining, that one can't believe the talented team behind it, who specialise in humour, couldn't foresee their impact on screen".

The New Indian Express reviewed that "Asokan somehow manages to keep things moving, and, if anything, he proves that he is a fairly skilled director. He has only begun, and one expects he'll get better with his next directorial" and went on to say "Though it's not the sort of film that sticks with you, an ample amount of fun can be had if you've got the patience for it."
