= Mumbai Taxi =

2015 Malayalam film

- Directed by: Fasil AB
- Produced by: Riyaz Fazzan
- Starring: Badusha Mohammed; Riyaz Fazzan; Mareena Micheal; Babu Jose; Shivaji Guruvayoor; Sreejith Ravi; Tini Tom
- Cinematography: Noorudheen Bava
- Release date: 7 August 2015
- Country: India
- Language: Malayalam

Mumbai Taxi is a 2015 Malayalam thriller film directed by Fasil AB , released on 7 August 2015 in theatres. The film stars Badusha Mohammed as the central character, with Riyaz Fazzan, Mareena Michael, Babu Jose, Shivaji Guruvayoor, Sreejith Ravi, Tini Tom.This movie was dubbed in Tamil, Telugu and Hindi as same title.

== Plot ==
The film is about how a set of officials try to deal with a bomb threat happens in a single day in the city of Mumbai. The movie revolves around a taxi driver in Mumbai. Badusha does the lead role of Bhagath, a taxi driver. Marina Michael Kurushingal does the female lead. She plays Nanditha, a passenger in the taxi driven by Bhagath. A thrilling story follows with the arrival of an anonymous message to the special office under Anti Terrorist Squad.

== Cast ==
- Badusha Mohammed as Bhagath
- Mareena Michael Kurisingal as Nanditha

== Production ==
This film marks the return of actor Badusha (nephew of Cochin Haneefa) who acted as a child in Pappayude Swantham Appoos (1992).

== Reception ==
A critic from The Times of India wrote that "There is hardly any notable performance from the actors simply because there is scarcely anything for them to work with. It's a shoddily made film with a shallow narrative in which nothing happens but characters stand together accompanied by irritable levels of background music".
