= Neymar (film) =

- Theatrical release poster
- Directed by: Sudhi Maddison
- Screenplay by: Adarsh Sukumaran; Paulson Skaria
- Produced by: Padma Uday
- Starring: Mathew Thomas; Naslen; Johny Antony; Shammi Thilakan; Vijayaraghavan
- Cinematography: Alby
- Edited by: Noufal Abdullah
- Music by: Shaan Rahman; Gopi Sundar (Background Score)
- Production company: V Cinemas International
- Release date: 12 May 2023
- Running time: 160 minutes
- Country: India
- Language: Malayalam
- Box office: est. ₹10 crore (US$1.0 million)

Neymar is a 2023 Indian Malayalam-language comedy film directed by Sudhi Maddison and produced by Padma Uday under the banner of V Cinemas International. The film stars Mathew Thomas, Naslen, Vijayaraghavan, Johny Antony and Shammi Thilakan. It was released in theatres on 12 May 2023.

== Plot ==
In order to impress the girl he has a crush on, Kunjava and his best friend Sinto buy a dog named Neymar, who becomes their friend however, Neymar's artifice and chaos are enough to drive Kunjava's father Sahadevan, who sells the dog to a Puducherry and Kunjava and Shinto to embark on a journey to find the dog after leaving homes and learns that Neymar enters dog contest.

== Cast ==
- Mathew Thomas as Akash Sahadevan (Kunjava)
- Naslen as Shinto Chackola
- Yog Japee as Gabriel
- Shammi Thilakan as Sahadevan, Kunjava's father
- Vijayaraghavan as Chackola, Shinto's father
- Johny Antony as Thomas, Shinto's uncle
- Sajin Gopu as Kannan
- Rishikanth as Venkat
- Gowri Krishna as Dona, Kunjava's love interest
- Keerthana Sreekumar as Amala
- Deva Nandha as Cloudin
- Reshmi Boban as Mary Thomas
- Manu Vasudev as Chikku Pandi
- Manoj Beeds as Kumar
- Thushara Pilla as Mini Sahadevan
- Amala Rose Kurian as Celin Thomas
- Aravind Padma Uday as Albin
- Ajitha Nambiar as Achamma

== Production ==
Parts of the film was filmed in Pondicherry. The motion poster of the film was released in January 2023.

== Reception ==
=== Critical reception ===
Anjana George of The Times of India gave 3 out of 5 stars and stated "On the whole, Neymar the dog steals the show. A family entertainer for the vacation."

A critic of Onmanorama wrote "he film's blend of comedy, entertainment, and emotion makes it a must-watch for those seeking a cinematic experience that delivers it all." Sanjith Sidhardhan of OTTplay gave 2/5 stars and wrote "The lacklustre writing make director Sudhi Maddison's Neymar an insipid watch." Anandu Suresh of The Indian Express gave 1.5/5 stars and wrote "In short, Neymar proves to be a squandered opportunity for Malayalam cinema, as it adds to the absence of any compelling pet-centric movies in the industry, and all that we have had till now are movies like Ring Master (2014)."

=== Box office ===
Neymar was a commercial success at the box office. On its third day, the film earned ₹1 crore (US$100,000) from Kerala. After two weeks of its release, it grossed ₹4 crore (US$420,000). The film earned ₹7 crore (US$730,000) globally on its 17th day, with ₹5.1 crore (US$530,000) accounting to the Kerala box office. The total worldwide box office collection is expected to be over ₹10 crore (US$1.0 million).
