= Arun D. Jose =

Malayalam filmmaker

Arun D. Jose is an Indian film director and screenwriter working in the Malayalam film industry. He has directed Jo and Jo (2022) and Journey of Love 18+ (2023).

== Career ==
In 2022, he directed his debut, Jo and Jo, on a script he co-wrote with Raveesh Nath. It stars Mathew Thomas and Nikhila Vimal in titular roles. According to India Today, Jo and Jo was a box office hit in India and earned a profit of 26 crore.

In 2023, he again collaborated with writer Raveesh Nath with Journey of Love 18+. It stars Naslen Gafoor, Mathew Thomas, and Nikhila Vimal in lead roles. The same year, he also collaborated with Nath on the latter's directorial debut, Samadhana Pusthakam.

== Filmography ==
Year	Title	Credited as		Notes
Year	Title	Director	Writer	Notes
2022	Jo and Jo	Yes	Yes	Directorial debut
2023	Journey of Love 18+	Yes	Yes	
2024	Samadhana Pusthakam	No	Yes	
2025	Bromance	Yes	Yes	

== Personal life ==
Arun Jose was born in Wayanad, Kerala.
