= RDX (film) =

2023 film directed by Nahas Hidayath

- Theatrical release poster
- Directed by: Nahas Hidhayath
- Screenplay by: Adarsh Sukumaran; Shabas Rasheed
- Story by: Nahas Hidhayath
- Produced by: Sophia Paul
- Starring: Shane Nigam; Antony Varghese; Neeraj Madhav
- Cinematography: Alex J. Pulickal
- Edited by: Chaman Chakko
- Music by: Sam C. S.
- Production company: Weekend Blockbusters
- Release date: 25 August 2023
- Running time: 151 minutes
- Country: India
- Language: Malayalam
- Box office: ₹85 crore

RDX: Robert Dony Xavier (also known as RDX) is a 2023 Indian Malayalam-language action thriller film directed by Nahas Hidhayath (in his directorial debut) and produced by Sophia Paul under Weekend Blockbusters. It stars Shane Nigam, Antony Varghese and Neeraj Madhav in the titular roles. alongside Babu Antony, Lal, Mahima Nambiar, Aima Rosmy Sebastian, Maala Parvathi and Baiju Santhosh. The film revolves around Robert, Dony and Xavier's crusade to exact vengeance against Paulson and his gang for assaulting their family.

The film was announced in August 2022. Principal photography commenced on 17 August 2022 and, after a short delay, resumed in December 2022. The filming wrapped up in April 2023. The music was composed by Sam C. S., while the cinematography and editing were handled by Alex J. Pulickal and Chaman Chakko respectively.

RDX was released on 25 August 2023, during Onam, to positive reviews from critics and grossed over ₹85 crore worldwide. The film collected ₹50 crore from Kerala state alone becoming the fourth Malayalam film to achieve this after Pulimurugan, Lucifer and 2018. The film became the third highest-grossing Malayalam film of the year and is currently one of the highest-grossing Malayalam films. In Kerala Film Critics Association Awards 2023, RDX was awarded as the Best Popular Film.

== Plot ==
1997-98: Robert, Xavier and Robert's elder brother Dony are best friends trained in karate and boxing under the supervision of Antony Aashaan, Xavier's father and a friend of Robert and Dony's father Philip. Robert, Dony and Xavier always get entangled in fights, which causes headaches for the families.

During the Cochin Carnival, Robert gets involved in a fight with Jaison, who is from his girlfriend Mini's colony, after he caused problems during Mini's dance performance. Robert, Dony and Xavier beat everyone and Robert breaks Jaison's leg. During the fight, Robert unknowingly causes a fire accident that puts an end to the carnival. Fearing for Robert's safety from Jaison, Philip sends Robert to Bangalore.

2005: During a yearly church festival in Kochi, Philip tries to stop a gang from creating trouble, but gets beaten by the gang. Seeing this, Dony thrashes them. Later, the same gang breaks into Philip's house and ambushes them, which leaves Dony, Dony's family and his wife Simi severely injured and rob things, including his daughter Sara's necklace that makes a deep cut on her neck. Robert, who is now a bartender, learns about the ambush and returns home. Robert joins Dony to exact revenge on the gang members.

Through one of the gang member Suni, Robert and Dony reach the colony to fight them, but they get outnumbered easily after the gang is informed about their arrival. Robert hides in one of the houses and meets Mini, who is now married to one of the gang member Ratheesh. Xavier arrives in time to save them and three of them escape from the colony.

Xavier reveals that the gang that ambushed the family was led by Jaison's brother Paulson, who wanted to exact revenge for thrashing him at the church festival. Paulson sends his men to attack Robert, Dony and Xavier at the hospital, but the trio, along with Philip, Simi and Antony escape from the hospital in an ambulance.

Paulson and the rest of the colony members chase after them. Ratheesh goes to help Paulson, but Mini stops him by tying him to a chair. Robert, Dony, Xavier and Antony finally defeat Paulson's men and Robert incapacitates Paulson by snapping his spinal cord. During the celebration of Sara's birthday, Robert, Dony and Xavier learn that Paulson's sidekick Davis has been released from prison, where they intercept Davis and thrash him.

== Cast ==
- Shane Nigam as Robert, Philip and Kunjumol's younger son
- Antony Varghese as Dony, Philip and Kunjumol's elder son
- Neeraj Madhav as Xavier, Antony's son and Robert and Dony's friend
- Lal as Philip, Robert and Dony's father
- Babu Antony as Antony, Xavier's father and a karate trainer
- Baiju Santhosh as CI Roy Sebastian, Philip's brother-in-law
- Maala Parvathi as Kunjumol, Robert and Dony's mother
- Mahima Nambiar as Mini, Robert's ex-girlfriend and Ratheesh's wife
- Aima Rosmy Sebastian as Simi, Dony's wife
- Nishanth Sagar as Davison, Paulson's and Jaison's elder brother
- Sujith Shankar as Jaison, Paulson's elder brother
- Vishnu Agasthya as Paulson, Jaison's younger brother
- Sruthy Suresh as Sruthy, Mini’s Best friend
- Arya Salim as Jancy, Jaison's wife
- Sreejith B. Nair as Peter
- Dineesh P. as Suni
- Sandeep Raj as Seban
- Midhun Venugopal as Faisal
- Siraj as Ratheesh, Mini's husband
- Harisankar Rajendran as Anas
- Nahas Hidhayath as an announcer at a cricket match

== Production ==
=== Development ===
In August 2022, Sophia Paul announced her next film based on martial arts featuring Shane Nigam, Antony Varghese and Neeraj Madhav titled Robert Dony Xavier, abbreviated as RDX. The film marked the directorial debut of Nahas Hidhayath, who was an assistant director in Godha (2017). The film produced by the banner Weekend Blockbusters was made on a budget of ₹8 crore. Rasheed Shabazz and Adarsh Sukumaran have written the script and dialogues for the film. Sam C. S. has been hired as the music director after his debut in Odiyan (2018) and Manu Manjith has written the lyrics for the songs. Richard Kevin of Vikram Vedha (2017) and Suzhal: The Vortex (2022) was signed in for editing, but was replaced by Chamman Chacko. Alex J. Pulickal was hired for the cinematography, while Anbariv were signed to design the action sequences.

=== Casting ===
Antony Varghese, Shane Nigam and Neeraj Madhav were cast in the lead roles to play the titular characters. Lal, Babu Antony, Baiju Santhosh, Shammi Thilakan, Maala Parvathi and Nishanth Sagar were cast to play supporting roles. Mahima Nambiar and Aima Rosmy Sebastian were finalised to play the female leads.

=== Filming ===
The Principal photography began on 17 August 2022, with a puja at Anchumana Temple in Ernakulam, Kerala. Sofia Paul's mother, Agnes Antony, gave the first clap. The shooting was discontinued, and a four-month delay due to Antony Varghese's injury and unsuitable weather pushed them to restart production in December 2022. The shooting resumed on 15 December 2022 in Kochi. The shooting wrapped up in four months, on 13 April 2023.

== Music ==
The soundtrack and background score were composed by Sam C. S, while the song lyrics were written by Manu Manjith. The audio rights were bagged by Saregama. The first single titled "Halaballoo" was released on 26 July 2023. The second single titled "Scene Mone" was released on 17 August 2023.

== Release ==
=== Theatrical ===
RDX: Robert Dony Xavier was theatrically released on 25 August 2023, coinciding with Onam. The film was censored with a U/A certificate by the CBFC before release.

=== Home media ===
The satellite rights of the film were sold to Asianet, while Netflix has acquired the post-theatrical digital rights and began streaming it on 24 September 2023 in Malayalam and in dubbed versions of Hindi, Kannada, Tamil and Telugu languages.

== Reception ==
=== Critical response ===
RDX received positive reviews from critics.

Anjana George of The Times of India gave 3.5/5 stars and wrote "Overall, there's nothing that surpasses the adrenaline rush of action cinema. Have a holidays filled with action-packed excitement." Sanjith Sidhardhan of OTTplay gave 3.5/5 stars and wrote "Each of these sequences is mounted on a big scale or at least has a novel aspect to it, keeping the audience hooked. The makers of RDX made no other claims other than it's an action-packed film and they deliver on that promise."

Anandu Suresh of The Indian Express gave 3.5/5 stars and wrote "RDX serves as the gift that Malayalam audiences have longed for — a theatrical entertainment that matches the electrifying experiences found in other languages." Vignesh Madhu of Cinema Express gave 3.5/5 stars and wrote "RDX relies on such familiar moments to create a rousing experience. The film also smartly overcomes the redundancy in the fights by placing the action sequences in different locations—open grounds, a massive carnival field, passenger boat and a thickly populated colony."

Princy Alexander of Onmanorama wrote "The stunts by Anbariv and Irfan Khan elevate the film's quality. Yet, it's the actors who deserve credit, having executed punches and kicks with finesse. In conclusion, the film will likely resonate more with audiences seeking a cinematic experience with high-octane and high-voltage fight sequences this Onam season." S. R. Praveen of The Hindu wrote "RDX certainly lacks the technical flair or finesse of these films, but it makes up for it in having a bare-minimum story, which gives the audience the emotional need to root for the three, and in having some pulsating action sequences courtesy the action choreographer duo Anbariv." Akilan Nagarajan of the Film Companion wrote "A generic action film that doesn't go beyond its self-imposed mass-entertainer image. RDX will still find its audience because this can seem like exactly what they need at the moment, but they sure deserve better."

=== Box office ===
RDX was a commercial success at the box office, earning over ₹80 crore (US$8.5 million) worldwide, with Kerala grossing over ₹50 crore (US$5.3 million).

The film grossed over ₹1 crore (US$110,000) on its first day. Within three days of its release, it had grossed ₹13.80 crore (US$1.5 million) worldwide, with ₹7.70 crore (US$820,000) coming from Kerala and ₹6.10 crore (US$650,000) coming from overseas. It earned around ₹30 crore (US$3.2 million) on its sixth day. The film grossed ₹50 crore (US$5.3 million) at the box office within nine days, making it one of the quickest in Malayalam cinema.

RDX grossed $33,672 in New Zealand, $76,332 in Australia and $1,685,175 in the United Arab Emirates, totaling $1,795,179 in international earnings.

== Controversies ==
Director Nahas Hidayath and producer Sophia Paul

The producers and director Nahas have been involved in a dispute over a breach of contract. The producers allege that Hidayath quit the project after receiving an advance payment of Rs 40 lakh and an agreement to work on a second film. Hidayath denies the allegations, claiming that he was considering other opportunities and that no formal contract was signed.

Ban of Shane Nigam

Nigam was banned by the Kerala Film Producers Association and FEFKA after complaints from the producers. The producers alleged that Nigam was indisciplined and caused financial loss by walking off set. Nigam wrote a letter to the Association of Malayalam Movie Artists (AMMA) denying the allegations, claiming that the producers misbehaved with his mother and provided him with a dirty caravan.

== Accolades ==
Year	Award	Category	Recipient	Ref.
2023	Kerala Film Critics Association Awards	Best Popular Film	Nahas Hidhayath	
2023	Kerala Film Critics Association Awards	Best Supporting Actor	Shane Nigam	
2024	Filmfare Awards South	Best Male Playback Singer – Malayalam	Kapil Kapilan – "Neela Nilave"	
2024	Filmfare Awards South	Best Music Director – Malayalam	Sam C. S.	
