= Prakashan Parakkatte =

Film directed by Shahad Nilambur

- Poster
- Directed by: Shahad Nilambur
- Written by: Dhyan Sreenivasan
- Produced by: Visakh Subramaniam; Tinu Thomas; Aju Varghese
- Starring: Mathew Thomas; Dileesh Pothan; Nisha Sarang
- Cinematography: Guruprasad M. G.
- Edited by: Rathin Radhakrishnan
- Music by: Shaan Rahman
- Production companies: Funtastic Films; Hit Makers Entertainments
- Distributed by: Funtastic Films
- Release date: 17 June 2022
- Running time: 124 minutes
- Country: India
- Language: Malayalam

Prakashan Parakkatte (transl. Let Prakashan fly) is a 2022 Indian Malayalam-language family drama film directed by Shahad Nilambur and written by Dhyan Sreenivasan. It stars Mathew Thomas, Dileesh Pothan, Nisha Sarang, Saiju Kurup, Aju Varghese, Dhyan Sreenivasan, Malavika Manoj and Sreejith Ravi. Rathin Radhakrishnan edits the film while Guruprasad handles the cinematography. Shaan Rahman composes the original songs and background score. The film is produced by Aju Varghese and Visakh Subramaniam under Funtasic Films in association with Tinu Thomas ' Hit Makers Entertainments. The film also marks the debut of 5 year old Ritunjay, son of actor Sreejith Ravi and grandson of actor T. G. Ravi.

The film was released in theatres on 17 June 2022 and it received positive to mixed reviews. The film collected ₹1.25 crore in 3 days of its release and performed average at the box office.

== Premise ==
Dasan son of Prakashan is a 12th standard student who is a habitual absentee at his school. Instead of going to classes he roams around town with his close friend Anwar. He feels disillusioned with his family when they celebrate his little brother Akhil's successes and birthday. Meanwhile, he falls in love with Neethu and pursues that relationship. Carelessness from Dasan causes his brother a near-fatal accident. This and his failure in final exam cause changes in the way he carried on with his life.

== Cast ==
- Mathew Thomas as Das Prakash, Prakashan's elder son
- Dileesh Pothan as Prakashan
- Nisha Sarang as Latha Prakashan, Prakashan's wife
- Malavika Manoj as Neethu
- Govind V Pai as Anwar
- Saiju Kurup as Kozhi Kuttan, Prakashan's brother-in-law
- Dhyan Sreenivasan as Suni Maash (aka Passion Suni inspired)
- Aju Varghese as Musthafa (Cameo appearance)
- Sreejith Ravi as Sakhavu Raghavan
- Ritunjay Sreejith as Akhil Prakash, Prakashan's younger son
- Aswin Jose as Sohaib
- Nithin Sabu as Vinu, Prakashan's nephew
- Stevin Biju as guest role

== Production ==
The film was announced on 14 November 2020 on children's day as the movie followed the dreams of a young boy. Principal photography of the film began on 18 January 2021 at Poovaranthode, Aanakkampoyil and Kozhikode city. The filming was completed on 16 February 2021.

== Release ==
The film released in theatres on 17 June 2022.

=== Home media ===
The post-theatrical streaming rights of the film was bought by ZEE5 and the satellite rights of the film was bought by Zee Keralam.
