= Mathew Thomas =

Indian actor (born 2002)

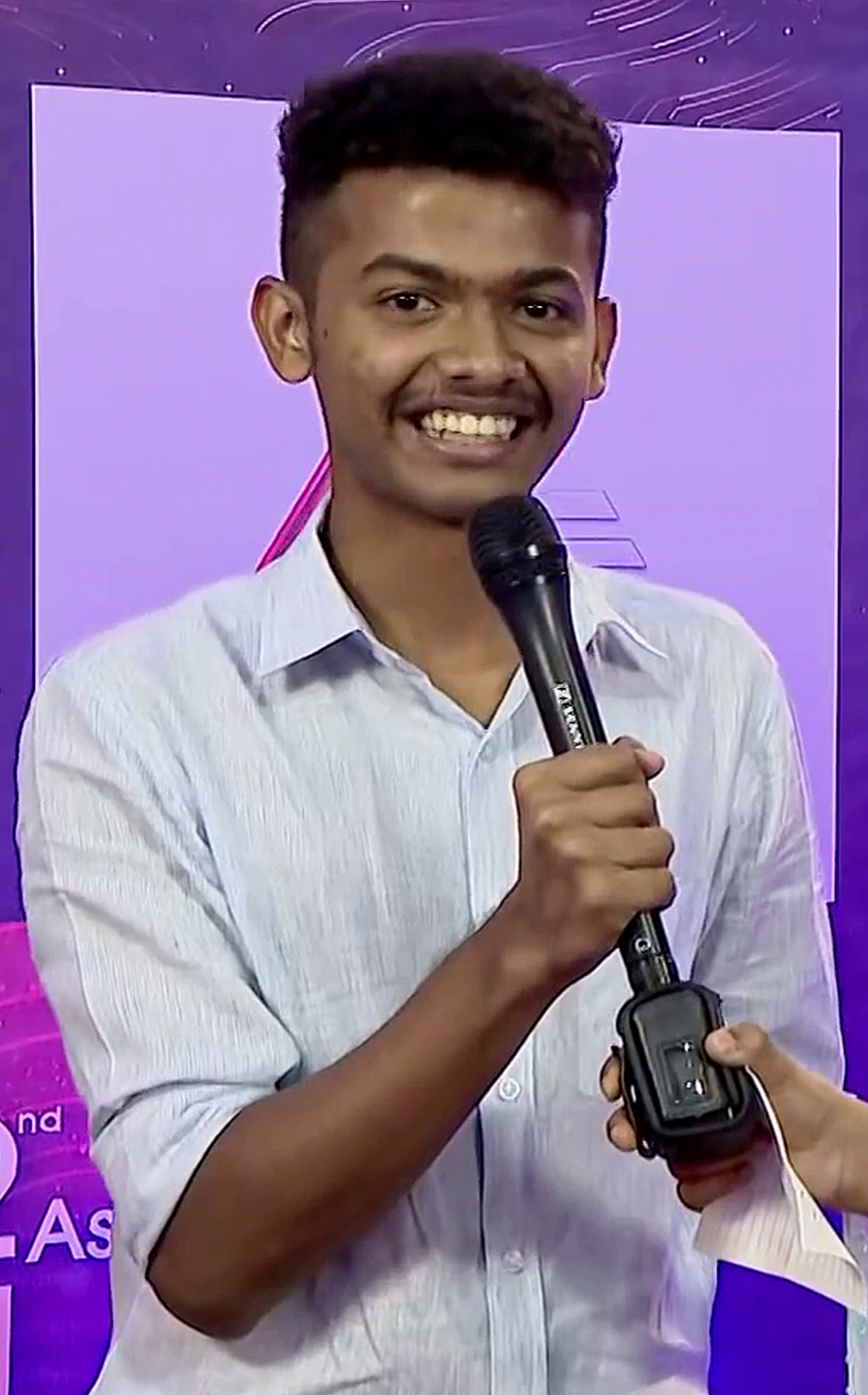
- Mathew at the 22nd Asianet Film Awards
- Born: 16 October 2002 (age 24); Thiruvankulam, Kerala, India
- Occupation: Actor
- Years active: 2019–present

Mathew Thomas (born 16 October 2002) is an Indian actor who predominantly works in Malayalam cinema and occasionally appeared in Tamil films. He is known for his debut movie Kumbalangi Nights and later releases Thanneer Mathan Dinangal, Jo and Jo and Leo.

== Career ==
He debuted through a role in the 2019 film Kumbalangi Nights, which he earned through an audition held at his school. The film was a critical and commercial success. It was followed by the lead role in Thanneer Mathan Dinangal (2019), a teenage romance film about a high-school student, Jaison. It received highly positive reviews from both critics and audience. He appeared as a young Benjamin Louis in the crime thriller Anjaam Pathiraa (2020), which was commercially successful. He also played a minor role in cyber crime thriller Operation Java. In 2021, he played a supporting role in the Mammootty starrer One, where his performance was well praised by critics and audience. In 2023, he made his Tamil film debut in Leo.

== Filmography ==
- All films are in Malayalam unless otherwise noted.

Year	Title	Role	Notes	Ref.
2019	Kumbalangi Nights	Franky Napoleon	Debut film	
2019	Thanneer Mathan Dinangal	Jaison		
2020	Anjaam Pathiraa	Young Benjamin Louis		
2021	Operation Java	Jerry		
2021	One	Sanal		
2022	Jo and Jo	Jomon		
2022	Prakashan Parakkatte	Das Prakashan		
2022	Visudha Mejo	Ambros		
2023	Christy	Roy		
2023	Neymar	Kunjava		
2023	Journey of Love 18+	Deepak		
2023	Leo	Siddharth "Siddhu"	Tamil film	
2023	Family	Nobi		
2024	Premalu	Thomas	Cameo Appearance	
2024	Samadhana Pusthakam	Paranki Praveesh	Cameo Appearance	
2024	Cup	Nidhin Babu "Kannan"		
2025	Bromance	Binto		
2025	Nilavuku En Mel Ennadi Kobam	Rajesh	Tamil film	
2025	Lovely	Boney		
2025	Nellikkampoyil Night Riders	Shyam		
2026	Sukhamano Sukhamann	Theo		
2026	Pradhama Drishtiya Kuttakkar	CPO Sreenath Iyappan		
2026	Udumbanchola Vision	Mithun		

== Awards ==
- 2020 – Asianet Film Awards for Best Star Pair of the Year – Thanneer Mathan Dinangal (shared with Anaswara Rajan)
- 2020 – Vanitha Film Awards for Best Newcomer Actor of the Year – Thanneer Mathan Dinangal and Kumbalangi Nights
