= Anuragam (film) =

2023 Malayalam romantic comedy film

- Theatrical release poster
- Directed by: Shahad Nilambur
- Written by: Aswin Jose
- Produced by: Premachandran AG; Sudhish N
- Starring: Aswin Jose; Gouri Kishan; Gautham Vasudev Menon; Lena; Johny Antony; Devayani
- Cinematography: Suresh Gopi
- Edited by: Lijo Paul
- Music by: Joel Johns
- Production companies: Lakshminath Creations; Satyam Cinemas
- Release date: 5 May 2023
- Country: India
- Language: Malayalam

Anuragam (transl. Love or passion) is a 2023 Indian Malayalam-language romantic comedy film directed by Shahad Nilambur and written by Aswin Jose. It is produced by Premachandran AG and Sudhish N under the banners of Lakshminath Creations and Satyam Cinemas. The film stars Aswin Jose, Gouri Kishan, Gautham Vasudev Menon, Lena, Johny Antony and Devayani, alongside Sheela, Sudheesh, Manikandan Pattambi, Durga Krishna and Jaffer Idukki in supporting roles. This film marks the comeback of Devayani after a gap of 6 years in Malayalam movies.

Anuragam was theatrically released on 5 May 2023.

== Cast ==
- Aswin Jose as Aswin
- Gouri G. Kishan as Janani
- Gautham Vasudev Menon as Shankar, Janani's father
- Lena as Devika, Janani's mother
- Johny Antony as Jose
- Devayani as Mercy, Aswin's mother
- Moozi as Moosi
- Sheela as Jose's mother
- Sudheesh as Father Stephen Antony
- Manikandan Pattambi as Ravi
- Durga Krishna as Neetha
- Jaffar Idukki as Moosi's father
- Balaji Sarma as Advocate

== Production ==
The filmmaker announced that Gautham Vasudev Menon and Ashwin Jose in lead role and earlier the production team announced the film will release in October 2022. The first look poster of the film was released in November 2022 by Dileesh Pothan. Later Gautham Vasudev Menon featuring song was released and Trailer was released in April 2023. Debutant Joel Jones has arranged the songs to the lyrics of Tito P Thangachan.

== Soundtrack ==
The music of the film is composed by Joel Johns. All Songs were written by Titto P Thankachen except "Chill Aane" and "Edhuvo Ondru". Chill Aane was written by Manu Manjith & AK# (Rap Lyrics) and Edhuvo Ondru (Tamil Song) was penned by Mohan Rajan

No.	Title	Lyrics	Artist(s)	Length
1.	"Anuraga Sundhari"	Titto P Thankachen	Kapil Kapilan	5:14
2.	"Midhunam Madhuram"	Titto P Thankachen	Vidhu Prathap, Mridula Warrier	4:14
3.	"Chill Aane"	Manu Manjith, AK# (Rap Lyrics)	Ranjith Govind, Anuj Sekhar & Joel Johns	4:28
4.	"Edhuvo Ondru"	Mohan Rajan	Joel Johns, Hanan Shaah	4:25
5.	"Oru Nooru Ninavukal"	Titto P Thankachen	Najim Arshad, Bhadra Rejin	4:58
6.	"Madhurithame"	Titto P Thankachen	Joel Johns, Manu Gopinath	1:47
Total length:				24:57

== Reception ==
Anjana George critic of Times of india gave 3.5 stars out of 5 and stated that "Anuragam is a vacation picture for those who love to laugh and come out with happy colours from the theatres.". Swathi P Ajith critic of Onmanorama stated that "Overall, the movie provides a light-hearted and enjoyable watch for those seeking a simple, uncomplicated storyline.". A critic of ManoramaOnline gave mixed review.
