= Nahas Hidhayath =

Indian director and scriptwriter

- Born: 27 July 1994 (age 32); Kanjirappally, Kerala, India
- Occupations: Film director; scriptwriter
- Years active: 2017–present
- Spouse: Shafna (m. 2024)

Nahas Hidhayath (Malayalam: നഹാസ് ഹിദായത്ത്, born 27 July 1994) is an Indian film director and screenwriter. He made his directorial debut with RDX (2023), an action thriller that became the third highest-grossing Malayalam film of the year. The film also won the Best Popular Film award at the Kerala Film Critics Association Awards.

== Career ==
Nahas Hidhayath began his career as an assistant director, working with Basil Joseph on the 2017 Malayalam film Godha. He also appeared in a minor role in Queen (2018), directed by Dijo Jose Antony. In 2021, he directed two short films, 14 Days of Love and Colour Padam, starring Mamitha Baiju, both of which gained popularity on YouTube. The success of Colour Padam brought him to the attention of Weekend Blockbusters, where he pitched a story idea to producer Sophia Paul and they agreed to collaborate on a large scale theatrical film. This eventually led to his directorial debut with RDX (2023), an action thriller for which he also co-wrote the script. Released on 25 August 2023, RDX received positive reviews from critics and became a major box office success, grossing over ₹100 crore worldwide. The film was the third highest-grossing Malayalam film of 2023 and remains one of the highest-grossing Malayalam films of all time. At the 2023 Kerala Film Critics Association Awards, RDX won the award for Best Popular Film. Nahas announced his next film, starring Dulquer Salmaan, on 1 March 2025. Titled I'm Game, the film commenced principal photography in May 2025. Touted to be a sports-based thriller, it is being produced by Wayfarer Films.

== Personal life ==
Nahas Hidhayath was born on 27 July 1994 in Kanjirappally, a town in the Kottayam district of Kerala. He married Shafna on 25 February 2024 and currently resides in Ernakulam.

== Filmography ==
Year	Title	Credited as		Notes
Year	Title	Director	Writer	Notes
2016	King Liar	No	No	Actor
2017	Godha	Assistant Director	No	
2018	Queen	No	No	Actor
2021	14 Days of Love	Yes	Story	Short film
2021	Colour Padam	Yes	Yes	Short film
2023	RDX	Yes	Story	Best Popular Film at the Kerala Film Critics Association Awards
2025	“Padakkalam”	No	No	Actor
2026	I'm Game	Yes	Story	
