= List of Malayalam films of 2023 =

This is a list of Malayalam films that released in 2023.

251 Malayalam films released in 2023, most of them in theatres and some directly on OTT platforms.

== Box office collection ==
The highest-grossing Malayalam cinema films released in 2023, by worldwide box office gross revenue, are as follows:

Highest worldwide gross of 2023
Rank	Title	Production company	Gross	Ref
1	2018	Kavya Film Company	₹177 crores	
2	Neru	Aashirvad Cinemas	₹86 crores	
3	RDX: Robert Dony Xavier	Weekend Blockbusters	₹84.55 crores	
4	Kannur Squad	Mammootty Kampany	₹82 crores	
5	Romancham	Guppy Cinemas	₹70 crores	
6	King of Kotha	Warfare films Zee Studios	₹38.33 crores	
7	Garudan	Magic Framce	₹27 crores	
8	Voice of Sathyanathan	Badhusha Cinemas & 2 production companies	₹23 crores	
9	Pachuvum Athbutha Vilakkum	Full moon cinemas	₹17.20 crores	
10	Falimy	Cheere Entertainment	₹17.10 crores	

== January – March ==
*	Film released directly on OTT platform(s).

Opening		Title	Director	Cast	Production company / Studio	Ref
J A N U A R Y	1	Choodu	Arun Kishore	Yamuna Chungapalli, Vijilesh Karayad	BG9 Film House	
J A N U A R Y	6	Djinn	Sidharth Bharathan	Soubin Shahir, Sharaf U Dheen, Shine Tom Chacko, Santhy Balachandran, Leona Lishoy, Jaffar Idukki	Straightline Cinemas	
J A N U A R Y	6	Ennalum Ente Aliya	Bash Mohammed	Suraj Venjaramoodu, Gayatri Arun, Siddique, Lenaa	Magic Frames	
J A N U A R Y	6	Theru	S. J. Sinu	Amith Chakalakkal, Kalabhavan Shajon, Baburaj, Sanju Sivram, Sminu Sijo	Blue Hill Nael Communications, Nile and Blue Hill Motion Pictures	
J A N U A R Y	6	Iru	Fr. Varghese Lal	Rajeev Rajan, Nayana Elza, Dain Davis, Renji Panicker	Shakesphere Pictures	
J A N U A R Y	6	Chasing Days	Paul Aantonn	Laison John, Raghunath, Sajeev Ashtami, Anjaly	Maipapa Productions	
J A N U A R Y	6	Sofi	Joby Vayalumkal	Swati Tyagi, Dhanuja Reddy, Dibin V, Aneesh Ravi, Khadeeja Shareef	Vayalumkal Films	
J A N U A R Y	19	Nanpakal Nerathu Mayakkam	Lijo Jose Pellissery	Mammootty, Ashokan, Ramya Pandian, Kainakary Thankaraj	Mammootty Kampany, Amen Movie Monastery	
J A N U A R Y	20	Ayisha	Aamir Pallikkal	Manju Warrier, Krishna Sankar, Raadhika	Feather Touch Movie Box, Cross Border Camera, Imagin Cinemas Last Exit	
J A N U A R Y	20	Poovan	Vineeth Vasudevan	Antony Varghese, Sajin Cherukayil, Vineeth Vasudevan, Vineeth Vishwam, Akhila Bhargavan, Anishma Anilkumar	Shebin Backer Productions Stuck Cows	
J A N U A R Y	20	Premika	Sajeev Kilikulam	Sajeev Kilikulam	Jayendranath Films	
J A N U A R Y	20	Thel	Shafi S. S.	Dayana Hameed, Nandu Anand, Sajan Palluruthy	Tanveer Creations	
J A N U A R Y	20	Vanitha	Rahim Khadder	Lena, Salim Kumar, Seema G. Nair, Navas Vallikunnu	Shutter Sound Entertainment	
J A N U A R Y	26	Alone	Shaji Kailas	Mohanlal	Aashirvad Cinemas	
J A N U A R Y	26	Thankam	Saheedh Arafath	Biju Menon, Vineeth Sreenivasan, Girish Kulkarni, Aparna Balamurali, Kalaiyarasan	Working Class Heros, Fahadh Fasil and Friends	
F E B R U A R Y	1	The Hope	Joy Kallukaran	Lena, Srikant Murali, Sijoy Varghese, Sunil Sukhada	Logos Films	
F E B R U A R Y	3	Iratta	Rohith M. G.	Joju George, Anjali, Meenakshi Dinesh, Arya Salim, Srinda, Pooja Mohanraj, Srikant Murali	Appu Paathu Pappu Productions, Martin Prakkat Films	
F E B R U A R Y	3	Romancham	Jithu Madhavan	Soubin Shahir, Arjun Ashokan, Chemban Vinod Jose, Sajin Gopu, Siju Sunny	Johnpaul George Productions, Guppy Productions	
F E B R U A R Y	3	Vasanthi	Shinos Rahman & Sajas Rahman	Swasika, Siju Wilson, Shabareesh Varma	Wilson Pictures	
F E B R U A R Y	3	Vedikettu	Vishnu Unnikrishnan andBibin George	Vishnu Unnikrishnan, Bibin George, Aishwarya Anil Kumar, Samad Sulaiman	Sree Gokulam Movies	
F E B R U A R Y	3	Momo In Dubai	Ameen Aslam	Anu Sithara, Johny Antony, Aju Varghese, Hareesh Kanaran, Aneesh G. Menon, Albert Gayo	Imagine Cinemas, Cross Border Camera	
F E B R U A R Y	3	IPC 302	Shaju R.	Aristo Suresh, Ramesh Valiyasala	Halfmoon Cinemas	
F E B R U A R Y	9	Christopher	B. Unnikrishnan	Mammootty, Vinay Rai, Sneha, Amala Paul, Aishwarya Lekshmi, Shine Tom Chacko	RD Illuminations	
F E B R U A R Y	10	Rekha	Jithin Issac Thomas	Vincy Aloshious, Unni Lalu	Stone Bench Films and Originals	
F E B R U A R Y	17	Enkilum Chandrike	Aadithyan Chandrashekaran	Suraj Venjaramoodu, Basil Joseph, Saiju Kurup, Niranjana Anoop, Tanvi Ram	Friday Film House	
F E B R U A R Y	17	Christy	Alvin Henry	Malavika Mohanan, Mathew Thomas	Rocky Mountain Cinemas	
F E B R U A R Y	17	Dear Vaappi	Shan Thulaseedharan	Lal, Niranj Maniyanpilla Raju, Anagha Narayanan	Crown Films	
F E B R U A R Y	17	Her Story	K. S. Karthik	Anuroop O. A., Anjali Devi, Ajayan Madakkal, Sujeesh	Moviola Studios, FN Entertainments	
F E B R U A R Y	22	Pathimoonnu	B. N. Shajeer Sha	Fariya Hussain, Gauri, Shabeer, Rajesh Nair, Sabu Thiruvalla, Deepu Chris	ShaBroz Entertainers	
F E B R U A R Y	22	Kadal Munambu	Prathap Joseph	Jeo Baby, Yamuna Chungappally, S Pradeep, Devaki Bhagi	New Wave Film School	
F E B R U A R Y	24	Pranaya Vilasam	Nikhil Murali	Arjun Ashokan, Manoj K. U., Anaswara Rajan, Mamitha Baiju, Miya	Green Room Productions	
F E B R U A R Y	24	Boomerang	Manu Sudhakaran	Samyuktha Menon, Shine Tom Chacko, Chemban Vinod Jose, Baiju Santhosh	Easy Fly Productions	
F E B R U A R Y	24	Dharani	B. Sreevallabhan	Ratheesh Ravi, M. R. Gopakumar	Parallax Film House	
F E B R U A R Y	24	Oh My Darling	Alfred D' Samuel	Anikha Surendran, Melvin G. Babu	Ash Tree Ventures	
F E B R U A R Y	24	Ekan	Netto Christopher	Aldrin, Anjali Krishna, Saji Sopanam	La Frames	
F E B R U A R Y	24	Ntikkakkakkoru Premandaarnnu	Adhil M. Asharaf	Bhavana, Sharaf U Dheen, Ashokan (actor), Anarkali Nazar	Bonhomie Entertainments, London Talkies	
F E B R U A R Y	24	Divorce	Mini I. G.	Shibala Farah, Akhila Naath, Priyamvatha, Aswathi	Kerala State Film Development Corporation	
F E B R U A R Y	24	Santhosham	Ajith V. Thomas	Anu Sithara, Mallika Sukumaran, Kalabhavan Shajohn, Amith Chakalakkal	Mise-En-Scene Entertainment	
F E B R U A R Y	24	Pallimani	Anil Kumbazha	Nithya Das, Kailash, Shwetha Menon	LA Menon Productions	
M A R C H	3	Pakalum Paathiravum	Ajai Vasudev	Kunchacko Boban, Rajisha Vijayan, Guru Somasundaram, Seetha	Sree Gokulam Movies	
M A R C H	3	Krithi	Suresh UPRS	Irshad, Meera Vasudev, Ajin Shaji	Rain Drops Cinemas	
M A R C H	3	Mariyam	Bibin Joy, Shiha Bibin	Mrinalini Susan George, Joseph Chilamban, Rekha Lakshmi	AMK Productions	
M A R C H	3	Pathirakattu	Najeeb Madavoor	Sriram Karthick, Aavani, Sharon, Saju Navodaya	Sana Niya Production House LLP	
M A R C H	3	Uru	E. M. Ashraf	Mamukkoya, Manju Pathrose	Zams Production House	
M A R C H	3	Lovefully Yours Veda	Praghesh Sukumaran	Rajisha Vijayan, Venkitesh V. P., Sreenath Bhasi	R2 Entertainments	
M A R C H	3	1921: Puzha Muthal Puzha Vare	Ramasimhan	Joy Mathew, Thalaivasal Vijay, Narayanan Nair, Santhosh, Agna Suresh	Mamadharma Productions	
M A R C H	10	Thuramukham	Rajeev Ravi	Nivin Pauly, Indrajith Sukumaran, Joju George, Arjun Ashokan, Darshana Rajendran, Nimisha Sajayan	Thekkepat Films, Pauly Jr. Pictures, Collective Phase One, Queen Mary Movies	
M A R C H	10	Aalankam	Shani Khader	Lukman Avaran, Jaffar Idukki, Sharanya R. Nair	Ziad India Entertainments	
M A R C H	10	Khali Purse of Billionaires	Maxwell Jose	Dhyan Sreenivasan, Tanvi Ram, Aju Varghese, Sarayu Mohan	Royal Banjas Entertainment	
M A R C H	10	Maheshum Marutiyum	Sethu	Asif Ali, Mamta Mohandas, Maniyanpilla Raju	VSL Film House	
M A R C H	12	3 Days	Zakir Ali	Mansoor Mohammad, Gafoor Koduvally, Zakir Ali, Kiran Raj, Raja Sahib, Neena Kurup, Kanakalatha, Vijayan Karanthoor, Prakash Payyanakkal, Unni Raja, Salim Marimayam	Wama Entertainment	
M A R C H	17	Chaana	Bheeman Raghu	Bheeman Raghu, Meenakshi Chandran, Raman Vishwanath	Sweety Productions	
M A R C H	17	Love Revenge	K Mehmood	Binu Adimali	Silver Sky Productions	
M A R C H	17	Puliyattam	Santhosh Kallat	Sudheer Karamana, Meera Nair	Seven Masters Productions	
M A R C H	17	90:00 Minutes	Nithin Thomas Kurisingal	Arya Babu, Arun Kumar, Santhosh Keezhattoor, Sunil Sugatha	Phoenix International	
M A R C H	19	Ennu Sakshal Daivam	S.S. Jishnu Dev	Anas J Rahim, Manasa Prabhu, KPAC Sujith, Jalatha Bhaskar, T Sunil Punnakkad, Sudarsanan Russelpuram,Abhishek Sreekumar, Saran Indokera	Varaha Films	
M A R C H	24	Purusha Pretham	Krishand R. K.	Alexander Prasanth, Darshana Rajendran, Jagadish, Jeo Baby, Devaki Rajendran	Mankind cinemas	
M A R C H	24	Experiment 5	Manoj Thanath	Melvin Thanath, Devi Nanda, Rishi Suresh, Sree Padma, Manoj Thanath, Sona Philip	Esthep Star Creations	
M A R C H	24	Granny	K. Kaladharan	Shobha Mohan, Master Nivin, Baby Parvathy, Jayakrishnan, Ranji Panicker	Katho Movie Makers	
M A R C H	24	Vellari Pattanam	Mahesh Vettiyar	Manju Warrier, Soubin Shahir, Salim Kumar, Shabareesh Varma	Fullon Studios	
M A R C H	31	Higuita	Hemanth G. Nair	Suraj Venjaramoodu, Dhyan Sreenivasan, Manoj K. Jayan	Second Half Productions	
M A R C H	31	Laika	Ashad Sivaraman	Biju Sopanam, Nisha Sarang	VPS & Sons media	
M A R C H	31	Jawanum Mullapoovum	Raghu Menon	Sumesh Chandran, Sshivada, Rahul Madhav	2 Creative Minds	
M A R C H	31	Thuruth	Suresh Gopal	Sudheesh, Keerthi Sreejith	YES BE Creative	
M A R C H	31	Ottayan	Nishad Kattoor	Ginu Vaikath, Anju Ginu, T. K. Balaram	AG Talkies	
M A R C H	31	Kallanum Bhagavathiyum	East Coast Vijayan	Vishnu Unnikrishnan, Mokksha, Anusree	East Coast Communication Pvt Ltd	

== April – June ==
Opening		Title	Director	Cast	Production company / Studio	Ref
A P R I L	6	Corona Papers	Priyadarshan	Shane Nigam, Siddique, Shine Tom Chacko, Gayathrie	Four Frames Sound Company	
A P R I L	6	B 32 Muthal 44 Vare	Shruthi Sharanyam	Remya Nambeesan, Anarkali Marikar, Aswathy Babu	Kerala State Film Development Corporation	
A P R I L	7	Kaipola	K. G. Shyju	Indrans, Kalabhavan Shajohn, Anju Krishna	VMR Films	
A P R I L	7	Nannayikoode	Janet J. Biju	Sooraj Thelakkad, Arathy Biju, Mejo Joseph, Priya Mariya	Daiwik Productions	
A P R I L	8	Enthada Saji	Godfy Xavier Babu	Nivetha Thomas, Kunchacko Boban, Jayasurya, Arya (actress)	Magic Frames	
A P R I L	8	Pookkaalam	Ganesh Raj	Vijayaraghavan, Vineeth Sreenivasan, Basil Joseph, K. P. A. C. Leela, Annu Antony	CNC Cinemas, Thomas Thiruvalla Films	
A P R I L	8	Section 306 IPC	Sreenath Shiva	Rahul Madhav, Renji Panicker, Shanthi Krishna	Sree Varma Productions	
A P R I L	14	Adi	Prashob Vijayan	Shine Tom Chacko, Ahaana Krishna, Dhruvan, Anu Joseph	Wayfarer Films	
A P R I L	14	Thaaram Theertha Koodaram	Gokul Ramakrishnan	Karthik Ramakrishnan, Nainita Maria, Parvathi T.	Two Friends Productions	
A P R I L	14	Uppumavu	Syam Shivarajan	Kailash, Sarayu Mohan, Shivaji Guruvayoor, Seema G. Nair	Kattoor films	
A P R I L	14	Uschool	P. M. Thomas Kutty	Abijith Ravi, Archana Vinod	Bodhi Movie Works	
A P R I L	14	Madanolsavam	Sudheesh Gopinath	Suraj Venjaramoodu, Rajesh Madhavan, Babu Antony, Bhama Arun	Saina Movies	
A P R I L	14	Made in Caravan	Jomy Kuriakose	Annu Antony, Anson Paul, Mithun Ramesh, Indrans	Cinema Cafe Productions	
A P R I L	20	Neelavelicham	Aashiq Abu	Tovino Thomas, Rima Kallingal, Roshan Mathew, Shine Tom Chacko	OPM Cinemas	
A P R I L	21	Ayalvaashi	Irshad Parari	Soubin Shahir, Binu Pappu, Nikhila Vimal, Lijomol Jose, Naslen K. Gafoor	Ashiq Usman Productions	
A P R I L	21	Kadina Kadoramee Andakadaham	Muhashin Nalakath	Basil Joseph, Fara Shiblah	Naisam Salam Productions	
A P R I L	21	Sulaikha Manzil	Ashraf Hamza	Lukman Avaran, Chemban Vinod Jose, Anarkali Marikar	Chembosky Motion Pictures	
A P R I L	24	Antharam	P. Abhijith	Kannan Nair, Negha, Nakshathra Manoj	Group Five Entertainments	
A P R I L	28	Makottan	Rajeev Naduvanad	Biju Kuttan, Prarthana Nair	Remyam Creation	
A P R I L	28	Pachuvum Athbutha Vilakkum	Akhil Sathyan	Fahadh Faasil, Anjana Jayaprakash, Mukesh, Innocent, Vineeth, Indrans, Ahaana Krishna	Fullmoon Cinemas, Akhil Sathyan Films	
M A Y	5	2018	Jude Anthany Joseph	Kunchako Boban, Tovino Thomas, Asif Ali, Vineeth Sreenivasan, Aparna Balamurali	Kavya Film Company, P. K. Prime Production	
M A Y	5	Anuragam	Shahad	Aswin Jose, Gouri G. Kishan, Gautham Vasudev Menon, Devayani	Lakshminath Creations; Satyam Cinemas	
M A Y	12	Neymar	Sudhi Maddison	Mathew Thomas, Naslen K. Gafoor, Johny Antony, Shammi Thilakan, Vijayaraghavan	V Cinemas International	
M A Y	12	Janaki Jaane	Aneesh Upasana	Saiju Kurup, Navya Nair, Johny Antony, Sharaf U Dheen, Sminu Sijo, Pramod Velliyanad, Anarkali Marikar	Grihalakshmi Productions, S Cube Films	
M A Y	12	Chathi	Sharathchandran Wayand	Jaffar Idukki, Akhil Prabhakarn, Akhil Nath, Abu Salim, Lal Jose	WM Movies	
M A Y	19	Charles Enterprises	Subhash Lalitha Subrahmanian	Urvashi, Balu Varghese, Guru Somasundaram	Joy Movie Productions	
M A Y	19	Jackson Bazaar Youth	Shamal Sulaiman	Lukman Avaran, Jaffar Idukki, Indrans, Chinnu Chandini, Fahim Safar	Cross Boarder Camera, Imagine Cinema	
M A Y	23	Paseena	Rajan Kuduvan	Shobi Thilakan, Rajesh Hebbar, Sini Abraham, Pannyan Raveendran, C. K. Janu	Chirakkal Movies	
M A Y	26	Binary	Jasik Ali	Joy Mathew, Sijoy Varghese	VOC Media	
M A Y	26	God`s Own Players	A. K. B. Kumar	A. K. B. Kumar	AKB Movies International	
M A Y	26	Live	V. K. Prakash	Mamta Mohandas, Priya Prakash Varrier, Soubin Shahir, Shine Tom Chacko	Films24	
M A Y	26	Missing Girl	Abdul Rasheed	Sanuja Somanath, Ashika Ashokan, Afsal Aziz	Fine Films	
M A Y	26	Picasso	Sunil Kariattukara	Siddharth Rajan, Krishna	Ayaana Films	
M A Y	26	The Great Escape	Sandeep J. L.	Babu Antony, Sandeep J. L., Simon Kuke, Arthur Babu Antony	South Indian US Films	
M A Y	26	Thrishanku	Achyuth Vinayak	Arjun Ashokan, Anna Ben	Matchbox Shots, Lacuna Pictures, Clocktower Pictures & Co.	
J U N E	2	Neeraja	Rajesh Raman	Guru Somasundaram, Shruti Ramachandran, Jinu Joseph, Govind Padmasoorya	Suraj Production	
J U N E	2	Chakkala	Jain Christopher	Pramod Veliyanadu, Shaji Mavelikkara	IDAM Theatre	
J U N E	2	Dark Shades of a Secret	Vidya Mukundan	Rajeevan Vellur, Nebula M. P., Vidya Mukundan	Zaga International	
J U N E	2	Nombarakkoodu	Joshy Mathew	Somu Mathew, Harshitha Pisharody, Devanandhini Krishna	Civilian X Productions	
J U N E	2	Within Seconds	Vijesh P. Vijayan	Indrans, Sarayu Mohan	Ball entertainment	
J U N E	2	Snehambaram	Johnson Mash Engandiyur	Neena Kurup	Pulikkottil films	
J U N E	2	Pappa	Shibu Andrews	Anil Anto, Sharol Sunny, Nyga Sanu	Vin WIn Entertainment	
J U N E	2	Scene Number 36 Malavika Veedu	Suresh Sopanam	Appani Sarath, Vamika Suresh	Manju Suresh Films	
J U N E	2	Mea Culpa	Navaz Ali	Appani Sarath, Kailash, Teena Sunil	AMA Group	
J U N E	9	Kolla	Suraj Varma	Rajisha Vijayan, Priya Prakash Varrier, Vinay Forrt	Ravi Mathew Productions	
J U N E	9	Azhaku Machan	J. Francis Raja	Kollam Siraj, Ancy Varghese	Sudev & Surya Entertainments	
J U N E	9	O.Baby	Ranjan Pramod	Dileesh Pothan, Raghunath Paleri	Turtle Vine Productions	
J U N E	16	Amala	Nishad Ebrahim	Srikanth, Rajisha Vijayan, Anarkali Marikar, Appani Sarath	Mascot Productions	
J U N E	16	Flush	Aisha Sulthana	Pranav Prasanth, Dimple Paul	Beena Kasim Productions	
J U N E	16	Madhura Manohara Moham	Stephy Zaviour	Sharaf U Dheen, Rajisha Vijayan, Aarsha Chandini Baiju, Saiju Kurup	B3M Creations	
J U N E	16	Pendulum	Rejin S. Babu	Vijay Babu, Indrans, Anumol, Ramesh Pisharody	Lights On Cinemas, BAT Bros International	
J U N E	23	Aadiyum Ammuvum	Wilson Thomas	Aadi S., Avani Anjali, Jaffar Idukki, Madhupal	Akhil Films	
J U N E	23	Dhoomam	Pawan Kumar	Fahadh Faasil, Aparna Balamurali, Roshan Mathew	Hombale Films	
J U N E	30	Nalla Nilavulla Rathri	Murphy Devasy	Baburaj, Chemban Vinod Jose, Jinu Joseph, Binu Pappu	Sandra Thomas Productions, Million Dreams	
J U N E	30	Njaanum Pinnoru Njaanum	Rajasenan	Rajasenan, Indrans, Meera Nair	Clapin Movie Makers	
J U N E	30	Salmon	Shalil Kalloor	Vijay Yesudas, Jonita Doda	MJS Media	

== July – September ==
Opening		Title	Director	Cast	Production company / Studio	Ref
J U L Y	7	Journey of Love 18+	Arun D. Jose	Naslen K. Gafoor, Meenakshi Dinesh, Nikhila Vimal, Mathew Thomas	Falooda Entertainments	
J U L Y	7	Honeymoon Trip	Sathyadas Kanjiramkulam	Jean Anto, Akshaya, Devika, Vismaya, Lijo Joseph	Matha Films	
J U L Y	10	Aavegam	Vaisakh Sivaraman	Naveen, Rajesh, Visakh	V A Motion Pictures	
J U L Y	14	Padmini	Senna Hegde	Kunchacko Boban, Madonna Sebastian, Aparna Balamurali, Vincy Aloshious, Malavika Menon, Anaswara Rajan	Little Big Films	
J U L Y	21	Abhyuham	Akhil Sreenivas	Ajmal Ameer, Rahul Madhav, Athmiya Rajan	Movie Wagon Productions	
J U L Y	21	Akasham Kadann	Sidhique Kodiyathur	Maqbool Salmaan, Bhuvansewari Biju, Priya Sreejith	Dawn Cinemas	
J U L Y	21	Bhagavan Dasante Ramarajyam	Rasheed Parambil	T. G. Ravi, Akshay Radhakrishnan, Nandana Rajan, Irshad	Robin Reels Productions	
J U L Y	21	Kirkkan	Josh Bal	Kani Kusruti, Anarkali Marikar, Maqbool Salmaan	Mampra Cinemas	
J U L Y	21	Valatty	Devan Jayakumar	Vijay Babu, Mahima Nambiar, Rohini	Friday Film House	
J U L Y	23	Njaan Karnan	Srichithra Pradeep	T. S. Raju, Tony, Srichithra Pradeep, Pradeep Raj	Sriya Creations	
J U L Y	27	Kurukkan	Jayalal Divakaran	Vineeth Sreenivasan, Sreenivasan, Shine Tom Chacko, Malavika Menon, Gowri Nandha	Varnachitra	
J U L Y	28	Article 21	Lenin Balakrishnan	Lena, Aju Varghese, Joju George, Nandan Rajesh	Walk With Cinema	
J U L Y	28	Njaan Ippo Enthaa Cheyya	Vijay Menon	Abhimanyu Gowtham, Deepa Thomas	Menon Stories	
J U L Y	28	Sheela	Balu Narayanan	Ragini Dwivedi. Riyaz Khan, Chitra Shenoy	Priya Lakshmi Media	
J U L Y	28	Voice of Sathyanathan	Rafi	Dileep, Veena Nandakumar, Joju George, Jagapathi Babu	Pen & Paper Creations, Badusha Cinemas	
A U G U S T	1	Laala	Sathish P. Babu	Pranav Mohan, Yamuna Chungappalli, Gargi Gangan	Reel Carnival entertainment	
A U G U S T	4	Anakku Enthinte Keda	Shameer Bharathanoor	Akhil Prabhakar, Sneha Ajith, Veena Nair	BMC Films	
A U G U S T	4	Corona Dhavan	Nithin C. C.	Lukman Avaran, Sreenath Bhasi, Sruthy Jayan	James and Jerome Productions	
A U G U S T	4	Kenkemam	Shamon B. Parelil	Bhagath Manuel, Salim Kumar	On Demands In	
A U G U S T	4	Nila	Indu Lakshmi	Shanthi Krishna, Mamukkoya, Vineeth	Kerala State Film Development Corporation	
A U G U S T	4	Olam	V. S. Abhilash	Arjun Ashokan, Lena	Punathil Productions	
A U G U S T	4	Purple Poppins	M. B. S. Shine	Nissa Sumai, M. B. S. Shine, Tapan Dev	Siyaram Productions	
A U G U S T	4	Pullu	Praveen Kelikkoden	Reina Maria	First Clap Film	
A U G U S T	4	Pappachan Olivilanu	Sinto Sunny	Saiju Kurup, Srinda, Vijayaraghavan, Aju Varghese, Darshana S. Nair	Thomas Thiruvalla Films	
A U G U S T	8	Kalliyankattu Mana	Unnikrishnan Maruthorvattom	Boban Alummoodan, Sariga Sreekumar	Hercules india services	
A U G U S T	11	Baakki Vannavar	Amal Prasi	Salmanul, Anekh Bozs, Mirshan Khan, Nithin Babu	Blue Collar Cinemas, Collective Phase One	
A U G U S T	11	Jaladhara Pumpset Since 1962	Ashish Chinnappa	Indrans, Urvashi, Sanusha, Jayan Cherthala, T. G. Ravi	Wonderframes Filmland	
A U G U S T	11	Kunjamminis Hospital	Sanal V. Devan	Indrajith, Nyla Usha, Sarayu Mohan, Baburaj	Wow Cinemas	
A U G U S T	11	Munna	Surendran Kallur	Jagadish, Indrans	Chandrothveettil Films	
A U G U S T	11	Samara	Charles Joseph	Rahman, Bharath	Peacock Art House	
A U G U S T	17	Avakashikal	N. Arun	Irshad Ali, T. G. Ravi, Anju Aravind, Kukku Parameswaran	Real View Creations	
A U G U S T	18	August 27	Ajit Ravi	Shiju Rasheed, Sushmitha Gopinadh, Jaseela Parveen	Pegasus Global Private Limited	
A U G U S T	18	Digital Village	Ulsav Rajeev	Rishikesh P, Amrith Sanath, Vyshnav Kunju	Yulin Productions	
A U G U S T	18	Jailer	Sakkir Madathil	Dhyan Sreenivasan, Manoj K. Jayan, Divya Pillai	Golden Village Production	
A U G U S T	18	Irattachanakan	Johny Asamsa	Varun Dev, Tomichan Mulakuppadam, N. Jayaraj, Job Maichil, Jince Joseph, Praveen Neelambaran	Himuchri Creations	
A U G U S T	18	Sasiyum Sakunthalayum	Bichal Muhammed	Shaheen Siddique, Aami, Siddique	Aami Films	
A U G U S T	18	Aayirathonnu Nunakal	Thamar K. V.	Vishnu Agastya, Ramya Suresh, Shamla Hamsa,	Allens Media	
A U G U S T	24	King of Kotha	Abhilash Joshiy	Dulquer Salmaan, Prasanna, Aishwarya Lekshmi	Wayfarer Films, Zee Studios	
A U G U S T	25	Ramachandra Boss & Co	Haneef Adeni	Nivin Pauly, Mamitha Baiju, Aarsha Chandini Baiju, Vinay Forrt	Magic Frames	
A U G U S T	25	RDX: Robert Dony Xavier	Nahas Hidhayath	Shane Nigam, Antony Varghese, Neeraj Madhav, Mahima Nambiar	Weekend Blockbusters	
A U G U S T	25	Onnam Sakshi Parethan	Arun Vanja Raju	Visakh, Harikrishnan Sanu, Nikhita, VInaya	AVR Productions	
A U G U S T	26	Achanoru Vazha Vechu	Saandeep	Niranj Maniyanpilla Raju, Athmiya Rajan, A. V. Anoop, Dhyan Sreenivasan, Appani Sarath, Johny Antony, Mukesh, Lena, Shanthi Krishna	AVA Productions	
S E P T E M B E R	8	Mukalparappu	Siby Padiyara	Sunil Surya, Aparna Janardhanan	Jyothis Vision	
S E P T E M B E R	8	Nerchappetty	Babu John	Athul Suresh, Naira Nihar	Sky Gate Movies	
S E P T E M B E R	15	Kasargold	Mridul Nair	Asif Ali, Sunny Wayne, Malavika Sreenath, Vinayakan, Anjana Mohan	Yoodlee Films, Mukhari Entertainment LLP	
S E P T E M B E R	15	Nadhikalil Sundari Yamuna	Vijesh Panathur, Unni Vellora	Dhyan Sreenivasan, Pragya Nagra, Aju Varghese	Cinematica Films	
S E P T E M B E R	15	Praavu	Navaz Ali	Amith Chakalakkal, Yami Sona, Jamsheena Jamal	CET Cinema Pvt. Ltd.	
S E P T E M B E R	20	Thottampatturayunna Malepothi	Firose	Manoj Guninness, Meenakshi Anoop, Saju Kodiyan	Single Bridge Films	
S E P T E M B E R	21	Athirayude Makal Anjali - Chapter 1	Santhosh Pandit	Santosh Pandit, Nimisha, Twinkle, Thejaswini	Sree Krishna Films	
S E P T E M B E R	21	Rani: The Real Story	Shanker Ramakrishnan	Niyathi Kadambi, Indrans, Urvashi, Guru Somasundaram, Bhavana, Honey Rose	Magictail Works	
S E P T E M B E R	22	Akkuvinte Padachon	Murukan Melery	Master Vinayak, Mamukkoya, Shivaji Guruvayoor	Vinayakananda Cinemas	
S E P T E M B E R	22	La Tomatina	Sajeevan Anthikkad	Joy Mathew, Maria Thompson, Sreejith Ravi	Freethought Cinema	
S E P T E M B E R	22	Mister Hacker	Harris Kallar	Harris Kallar, Anna Rajan, Almas Motiwala	CFC Films	
S E P T E M B E R	22	Oruvattam Koodi	Sabu James	Senthil Krishna, Manoj Nandam, Amala Rose, Urmila Mahanta	Three Bells International	
S E P T E M B E R	22	Theeppori Benny	Raajesh Joji	Arjun Ashokan, Femina George, Jagadish	Shebin Backer Productions	
S E P T E M B E R	22	Vaathil	Sarju Ramakanth	Vinay Forrt, Anu Sithara, Krishna Sankar	Spark Pictures	
S E P T E M B E R	22	Vallicheruppu	Sreebharathi	Bijoy Kumar, Finn Bijoy, Chinnusree Valsalan	Sreemuruka Movie Makers	
S E P T E M B E R	25	Janvi	Rajendran Thevassery	Rahul Radhakrishnan, Preethi Jino, Joy Mathew, Pradeep Kottayam, Devan		
S E P T E M B E R	28	Kannur Squad	Roby Varghese Raj	Mammootty, Rony David, Shabareesh Varma, Azees Nedumangad	Mammootty Kampany	
S E P T E M B E R	29	8	Roshin A Rahman	Irfan Imam, Aneesha Ummer, Lekshmi Devan, Aritha Babu	Violet Films	
S E P T E M B E R	29	Ennivar	Sidhartha Siva	Sarjano Khalid, Sudheesh	1:1.3 Entertainments	

== October – December ==
Opening		Title	Director	Cast	Production company / Studio	Ref
O C T O B E R	5	Chaaver	Tinu Pappachan	Kunchacko Boban, Antony Varghese, Arjun Ashokan	Arun Narayanan Productions, Kavya Films	
O C T O B E R	5	Acid	Gokul K.	Madhav Chandran, Nikhil Jayan, Sneha Treesa, Prabisha Prem	Moonglade Films	
O C T O B E R	6	Aaromalinde Adhyathe Pranayam	Mubeen Rauf	Siddique Zaman, Amana Sreeni, Salim Kumar	Frame 2 Frame Motion Pictures	
O C T O B E R	6	Innalekal Thalirkkumbol	Sadanandan M. V.	Stephy Leon, Joyson Jose, Sarath Krishnan, Pramod Veliyanad,	S & S Productions	
O C T O B E R	6	Kopam	K. Mahendran	Nedumudi Venu, Alif Sha, Anjali Krishna, Allen Bleseena	BMK Cinemas	
O C T O B E R	6	Somante Krithavu	Rohith Narayanan	Vinay Forrt, Fara Shibila, Sruthy Suresh	On Stage Cinemas	
O C T O B E R	13	14 February	Vijay Chambath	Harith Vijayakrishnan, Aishwarya Nambiar, Apoorva Sasikumar	Cloud 9 Film International	
O C T O B E R	13	Kondotty Pooram	Majeed Maranchery	Hashim Abbas, Savanthika, Neha saxena, Mamukkoya	Takeoff cinemas	
O C T O B E R	13	KL 58S 4330 Ottayan	Rejin Naravoor	Devan, Santhosh Keezhattoor, Anju Aravind, Nirmal Palazhi, Aristo Suresh	Ramyam Creations	
O C T O B E R	13	Little Miss Rawther	Vishnu Dev	Gouri G. Kishan, Jishnu Sreekumar, Shersha Sherief, Nandini Goplakrishnan	S Originals	
O C T O B E R	13	Rahel Makan Kora	Ubaini Ebrahim	Anson Paul, Sminu Sijo, Merin Philip, Althaf Salim, Vijayakumar	SKG Films	
O C T O B E R	13	Velutha Madhuram	Jiju Orappadi	Shwetha Menon, Sudheer Karamana, Santhosh Keezhattoor, Surya Kiran, Afsana Lakshmi, Navani Karthi, Devika S Dev, Sabitha Ramith	Vaikhari Creations	
O C T O B E R	19	Athirayude Makal Anjali - Chapter 2	Santhosh Pandit	Santosh Pandit, Nimisha, Twinkle, Thejaswini	Sree Krishna Films	
O C T O B E R	20	Oru Thulli Thaappa	Vivek Ramachandran	Lal Jose, Jamshi Kannur, Rohith Krishna, Ambili, Nakshathra, Anusree Pothan	Richness Productions	
O C T O B E R	26	Pulimada	A. K. Sajan	Joju George, Aishwarya Rajesh, Chemban Vinod Jose, Lijomol Jose	Einstin Media, Lant Cinemas	
O C T O B E R	27	Don Vasco	Jojo Cyriac George	Jojo Cyriac George, Ida Naja Becker, Jagadish	DV Films	
O C T O B E R	27	Imbam	Sreejith Chandran	Deepak Parambol, Meera Vasudevan, Lalu Alex, Darshana Sudarshan	Mampra Cinemas	
O C T O B E R	27	Otta	Resul Pookutty	Asif Ali, Arjun Ashokan, Indrajith Sukumaran	Children Reunited LLP, Resul Pookutty Productions	
O C T O B E R	27	Rani Chithira Marthanda	Pinku Peter	Josekutty Jacob, Keerthana Sreekumar, Kottayam Nazeer, Sini Abraham	Once Upon A Time Productions	
O C T O B E R	27	Thirayattam	Sajeev Kilikulam	Jijo Gopi, Sreelakshmi Aravindakshan, Nadam Murali	AR Mainland Productions	
N O V E M B E R	3	Garudan	Arun Varma K. P.	Suresh Gopi, Biju Menon, Abhirami, Divya Pillai	Magic Frames	
N O V E M B E R	3	Oru Srilankan Sundari in AUH	Krishna Priyadarshan	Anoop Menon, Krishna Priyadarshan, Padmaraj Ratheesh	Manhar Cinemas	
N O V E M B E R	3	Oru Sadhachara Premakadha	Jayaraj Vijay	Santhosh Keezhattoor, Manikandan Pattambi, Nayana, Jeeja Surendran, Thesni Khan	Silver Movies International	
N O V E M B E R	3	Tholvi F.C.	George Kora	Sharaf U Dheen, Johny Antony, Meenakshi Raveendran, Poonam Gurung	Nationwide Pictures	
N O V E M B E R	10	Artharaathri Panthrandu Muthal Aaru Vare	Anto Titus, Krishna Prasad	Robin Stephen, Reshma Maneesh, Gowri Krishna	Arangam Studios	
N O V E M B E R	10	Bandra	Arun Gopy	Dileep, Tamannaah Bhatia, Dino Morea	Ajith Vinayaka Films	
N O V E M B E R	10	Vela	Syam Sasi	Shane Nigam, Sunny Wayne	Cyn-Cyl Celluloid	
N O V E M B E R	17	Falimy	Nithish Sahadev	Basil Joseph. Jagadish, Manju Pillai	Cheers Entertainments, Sooper Dooper films	
N O V E M B E R	17	In the Rain	Aadhi Balakrishnan	Abeni Aadhi	Light f Films	
N O V E M B E R	17	Neethi	Dr. Jessy	Kunhikannan Cheruvathur, Binoj Kulathoor, Babu Athani, Aneesh Sreedhar	Alwin Creation	
N O V E M B E R	17	Ottamaram	Benoy Velloor	Babu Namboothiri, Neena Kurup, Anjana Appukuttan	Sooryaa Event Team	
N O V E M B E R	17	Phoenix	Vishnu Bharathan	Chandhunadh, Aju Varghese, Anoop Menon, Abhirami Bose, Aradhya Ann	Front Row Productions	
N O V E M B E R	17	Sesham Mike-il Fathima	Manu C. Kumar	Kalyani Priyadarshan, Shaheen Siddique, Femina George, Gautham Vasudev Menon	Passion Studios, The Route	
N O V E M B E R	17	The Face of the Faceless	Shaison P. Ouseph	Vincy Aloshious, Jeet Matharru, Sonali Mohanty, Anjali Sathyanath, Ajeesh Joseph	Tri Light Creations	
N O V E M B E R	23	Kaathal – The Core	Jeo Baby	Mammootty, Jyothika, Anagha Maya Ravi, Pooja Mohanraj, Sudhi Kozhikode	Mammootty Kampany	
N O V E M B E R	24	Adrishya Jalakangal	Dr. Biju	Tovino Thomas, Nimisha Sajayan, Indrans	Ellanar Films, Mythri Movie Makers, Tovino Thomas Production	
N O V E M B E R	24	Class by a Soldier	Chinmayi Nair	Vijay Yesudas, Meenakshi Anoop, Shwetha Menon, Kalabhavan Shajohn	Zaphenath Paneah International	
N O V E M B E R	24	Edwinte Namam	Arun Raj	Master Farhan, Jennifer Mathew, Suresh Chitrasala, Rishi Suresh, Manju Yohannan	Friends Film Production House	
N O V E M B E R	24	Maharani	G. Marthandan	Roshan Mathew, Shine Tom Chacko, Lizabeth Tomy, Sruthy Jayan	SB Films, Badusha Productions	
N O V E M B E R	24	Pazhanjan Pranayam	Bineesh Kalarikkal	Rony David Raj, Vincy Aloshious, Azees Nedumangad	Ithihasa Movies	
D E C E M B E R	1	Antony	Joshiy	Joju George, Kalyani Priyadarshan, Chemban Vinod Jose, Nyla Usha	Einstin Media, Nextel Studios, Ultra Media Entertainments	
D E C E M B E R	1	Asthra	Azaad Alavil	Amith Chakalakkal, Suhasini Kumaran, Senthil Krishna	Porus Cinemas	
D E C E M B E R	1	Dance Party	Sohan Seenulal	Shine Tom Chacko, Vishnu Unnikrishnan, Prayaga Martin, Shraddha Gokul	Olga Productions	
D E C E M B E R	1	Krishna Kripa Sagaram	Anish Vasudevan	Jayakrishnan, Athira Murali, Kalabhavan Navas, Aishwarya Sanjay	Devidasan Creations	
D E C E M B E R	1	Ochu	Sarjulan	Sudheer Karamana, Hima shankar, Kalabhavan Navas	Roofland Production	
D E C E M B E R	1	Philip's	Alfred Kurian Joseph	Mukesh, Noble Babu Thomas, Charle, Navani Devanand, Sreedhanya	Little Big Films	
D E C E M B E R	8	A Ranjith Cinema	Nishanth Sattu	Asif Ali, Namitha Pramod, Saiju Kurup, Jewel Mary	Luminous Film Factory	
D E C E M B E R	8	Cheena Trophy	Anil Lal	Dhyan Sreenivasan, Kendy Zirdo, Devika Ramesh, Jaffar Idukki	Presidential Movies Pvt Ltd	
D E C E M B E R	8	Kadhikan	Jayaraj	Unni Mukundan, Mukesh, Ketaki Narayan, Gopu Krishna	Wide Screen Media Productions	
D E C E M B E R	8	Nona	Rajesh Irulam	Indrans, Sisira Sebastian	Mystical Rose Productions	
D E C E M B E R	8	Ohh... Cinderella	Renolze Rehman	Anoop Menon, Dilsha Prasannan	Anoopmenon Storyz	
D E C E M B E R	8	Pulli	Jiju Ashokan	Dev Mohan, Meenakshi Dinesh, Indrans, Kalabhavan Shajohn	Kamalam Films	
D E C E M B E R	8	Rajni	Vinil Scariah Varghese	Kalidas Jayaram, Namitha Pramod	Navarasa Films	
D E C E M B E R	8	Rani	Nizamudeen Nazar	Biju Sopanam, Shivani Menon, Maqbool Salmaan	SMT Productions	
D E C E M B E R	8	Thaal	Raja saagar	Rahul Madhav, Anson Paul, Devi Ajith	Great American Films	
D E C E M B E R	11	Heart of A Dog	Sreekrishnan K. P.	Ramachandran Mokeri, Dhanya Ananya, Sanju Madhav		
D E C E M B E R	14	Aarodu Parayan Aaru Kelkkan	Sainu Chavakkadan	Saju Navodaya, Ranjini George	High Hopes Film Factory	
D E C E M B E R	15	Achuthante Avasana Swasam	Ajay Ravi	Joseph Chilaban, Pauly Valsan, Anil Shivram	Presto Movies	
D E C E M B E R	15	Bullet Diaries	Santhosh Mandoor	Dhyan Sreenivasan, Prayaga Martin, Renji Panicker	B3M Creations	
D E C E M B E R	15	Far	Praveen Peter	Irena Mihalkovich, Praveen Peter, Abhinav Manikantan, Nila Cheviri	Tioh Creative	
D E C E M B E R	15	Kaathu Kaathoru Kalyanam	Jain Christopher	Tony Sigimon, Christee Bennet	Cherukara Films	
D E C E M B E R	15	Mothathi Kozhappa	Sony P. Jose	Sony P. Jose, Sneha Unnikrishnan, Sunil Sukhada	Manmiyas Productions	
D E C E M B E R	15	Ora Para Kalyana Vishesham	Aneesh Puthenpura	Kailash, Bhagath Manuel, Ashkar Soudan	Screen View Productions	
D E C E M B E R	15	Vaasam	Charles M.	M. R. Gopakumar, Kailash	Sai Krishna Movies	
D E C E M B E R	16	Pachappu Thedi	Kavil Raj	Vinod Kovoor, Mikku Kavil	Cine Friends Creations	
D E C E M B E R	17	Viral Sebi	Vidhu Vincent	Sudeep Koshy, Mira Hamid, Namitha Pramod	Badusha Productions	
D E C E M B E R	21	Neru	Jeethu Joseph	Mohanlal, Anaswara Rajan, Priyamani, Santhi Mayadevi	Aashirvad Cinemas	
D E C E M B E R	29	Adiyanthiravasthakalathe Anuragam	Alleppey Ashraf	Nihal Ahmed, Gopika Girish, Krishna Praba	Olive Productions	
D E C E M B E R	29	Neela Rathri	Ashok Nair	Manikandan Pattambi, Hima Shankar, Jayaraj Warrier	WJ Productions	
D E C E M B E R	29	Queen Elizabeth	M. Padmakumar	Narain, Meera Jasmine, Ramesh Pisharody, Mallika Sukumaran, Shweta Menon	Blue Mount Productions	
