= Romancham =

2023 Indian film by Jithu Madhavan

- Directed by: Jithu Madhavan
- Written by: Jithu Madhavan
- Produced by: Johnpaul George; Girish Gangadharan; Joby George Thadathil
- Starring: Soubin Shahir; Arjun Ashokan; Sajin Gopu; Siju Sunny; Chemban Vinod Jose; Anantharaman Ajay; Afsal P. H.
- Cinematography: Sanu Thahir
- Edited by: Kiran Das
- Music by: Sushin Shyam
- Production companies: Guppy Cinemas; John Paul George Productions
- Distributed by: Central Pictures
- Release date: 3 February 2023
- Running time: 129 minutes
- Country: India
- Language: Malayalam
- Budget: est. ₹1.75−3 crore
- Box office: est. ₹70 crore

Romancham (transl. Goosebumps) is a 2023 Indian Malayalam-language horror comedy film written and directed by Jithu Madhavan in his directorial debut. Inspired from real-life experiences of Jithu and his friends during their college days, the film stars an ensemble cast led by Soubin Shahir, Arjun Ashokan, Sajin Gopu, Siju Sunny, Chemban Vinod Jose, Abin Bino, Anantharaman Ajay, and Afsal P. H. Set in a men's hostel in Bangalore, the plot revolves around seven bachelors who try to summon a spirit via Ouija board. The film's soundtrack was composed by Sushin Shyam.

Romancham was released on 3 February 2023. The film was a commercial success and was the fifth highest-grossing Malayalam film of 2023. The film was remade in Hindi as Kapkapiii.

== Plot ==
2007: Jibin wakes up in the ICU of a hospital in Bangalore when he is told that he has been suffering from meningitis for a week. He desperately tries to meet his roommates to tell them something but is not allowed to meet anyone. The nurse is curious to know the reason and Jibin narrates his story to her.

Jibin, Rivin, Niroop, Shijappan, Mukesh, Karikuttan, and Soman are roommates in a rented house. Only Rivin and Karikuttan have full-time jobs and Soman attempts various businesses while the rest are looking for jobs.

One day, while visiting a friend, Jibin sees a group conducting a séance using a Ouija board in the hope of finding a ghost they can talk to. Realizing this is something the group can do as a pastime, he uses a carrom board as Ouija Board and gets the group to participate. Rivin, due to his religious beliefs, refuses to be a part of this. As they begin their séance, Jibin realizes nothing is happening, and, to save face, he and Shijappan, start moving the glass to make the rest of them believe that the séance is working. They come up with the name Anamika for the spirit and start asking various questions.

Soon, their séances becomes popular among their friends. On one occasion, a friend asks a question about their pet cat. The glass moves, without any help from Jibin and Shijappan, and has the right answer leaving them dumbfounded. Anamika now starts answering questions correctly including the death of someone. More and more people come to their house to have their questions answered.

Strange and weird incidents start to occur in the house. Rivin is not able to find his way home from work. Eventually the group decide to stop the séances as they feel that they have unleashed something that they can't control.

A friend of Jibin called Sinu comes to live with them temporarily. Sinu starts exhibiting weird behavior like going into a catatonic state and speaking to someone in the middle of the night, eventually frustrating Jibin and Niroop, who decide to send him away. Anamika's spirit now starts wrecking their home and many unnatural incidents start occurring again. Rivin again starts forgetting the way back home, and Karikuttan ends up losing his job at the petrol pump because, absent-mindedly, he ends up filling a customer's petrol tank with diesel. All of them lose their minds and try to leave their home as soon as possible. Jibin, due to his fears, ends up with high fever, which develops into meningitis.

Jibin reveals that the last thing he saw before losing consciousness was the spirit of a woman getting into his bag. Sinu is then shown walking into the hospital with that same bag, and reveals that Anamika's reply that day was 'WE ARE COMING', possibly setting up for a sequel.

== Cast ==
- Soubin Shahir as Jibin Madhavan alias Jibi (Based on Jithu Madhavan)
- Arjun Ashokan as Sinu Solomon
- Sajin Gopu as Niroop P
- Siju Sunny as Mukesh Mohanan
- Abin Bino as Shijappan / Shiju C
- Afzal PH as Hareesh P Mohanan (Karikkuttan)
- Anantharaman Ajay as Rivin Varghese
- Jagadeesh Kumar as Nithin Narayanan (Soman)
- Joemon Jyothir as DJ Babu
- Sreejith Babu as Mathew "Matthie"
- Noble James as Brujo
- Adithya Bhaskar as Aadi
- Deepika Siva as Nurse Nayana
- Sneha Matthew as Pooja
- Deepak Narayan as Pooja's father
- Thankam Mohan as Jibi's mother
- Jolly Chirayath as Sinu's mother
- Pooja Mohanraj as Maala
- Premnath Krishnankutty as Maala's husband
- Assim Jamal as Benny (Cameo Appearance)
- Chemban Vinod Jose as Sayed (Cameo Appearance)

== Production ==
=== Development ===
Romancham was announced in May 2022 and will features the actors Soubin Shahir, Arjun Ashokan among a few others, produced by Johnpaul George, Girish Gangadharan and Joby George Thadathil under the banner of Guppy Films and Johnpaul George Productions. Jithu Madhavan who has previously worked as an assistant director in the films Utopiayile Rajavu, Guppy, Maradona and Ambili was chosen to direct the film that marked his directorial debut. He also wrote the script. He revealed that the film was based on his personal experience. The script was inspired by his time as an aeronautical engineering student in Bengaluru in the late 2000s and it was during the period from 2005 to 2007, when he was living with ten friends in Bengaluru and out of curiosity decided to play the Ouija board game. He said that it was not easy to depict real life moments and he had to ensure that there were enough filmy elements. As per Jithu, Sinu's character was a mix of many incidents that happened in his real life. The film's shooting was wrapped up in early 2022.

=== Casting ===
Soubin Shahir and Arjun Ashokan were part of the cast during its announcement in May 2022. Most of the actors in the film were not mainstream actors. They were chosen due to their popularity in other media such as Instagram reels, and web series, each of them was selected without any prior audition. Jithu Madhavan called Abin Bino, while Bino was working in Dubai after seeing him play the role of Naththu in the webseries Othalanga Thuruth. Sajin Gopu who rose to fame with the role of a Jeep driver in Churuli was chosen by John Paul George. Siju Sunny, who garnered an online following after uploads of his comic content on Reels during COVID lockdown, was noticed by Jithu Madhavan, which prompted him to pick him. Siju had brief appearances in Visudha Mejo and Vellari Pattanam earlier.

== Music ==
Romancham

Soundtrack album by Sushin Shyam
- Released: 2023
- Recorded: 2022–2023
- Genre: Feature film soundtrack
- Length: 20:10
- Language: Malayalam
- Label: Saregama
- Producer: Sushin Shyam

Sushin Shyam chronology
Ariyippu (2023)	Romancham (2023)	Kannur Squad (2023)

All lyrics are written by Vinayak Sasikumar; all music is composed by Sushin Shyam.

No.	Title	Artist(s)	Length
1.	"Aadharanjali"	Sushin Shyam; Madhuvanthi Narayan	2:29
2.	"Aathmave Poo"	Sushin Shyam	3:36
3.	"Manuja"	Rex Vijayan; Sushin Shyam	3:29
4.	"Thalatherichavar"	Zia Ul Haq; MC Couper; Sushin Shyam	4:21
5.	"Ottamuri Vakkumayi"	Pradeep Kumar; Sushin Shyam	3:28
6.	"Romancham Title Track"	Neha Nair; Sushin Shyam	2:45
Total length:			20:10

== Release ==
=== Theatrical ===
Romancham was slated for a release on 14 October 2022 but was postponed. It was released on 3 February 2023 across 144 theatres in Kerala.

=== Home media ===
Romancham was released on Disney+Hotstar on 7 April 2023, and it was available Malayalam, Hindi, Tamil, and Telugu from 17 April 2023.

== Reception ==
=== Critical response ===
Romancham received positive reviews from critics. On the review aggregator website Rotten Tomatoes, 88% of 8 critics' reviews are positive, with an average rating of 7.5/10.

Gopika I.S. of The Times of India gave 4 out of 5 stars and wrote "Romancham is the movie that gives us this wonderful formula. There is no exaggeration, no nonsensical humour, the movie is simply hilarious and interestingly, it's inspired from real life incidents." S. R. Praveen of The Hindu wrote "Along with some top-notch comic performances from the entire cast, everything works like a charm and evokes uproarious laughter in director Jithu Madhavan's debut film." Saikat Chakraborty of The Telegraph wrote,"Debutant director Jithu Madhavan blends situational comedy with eerie overtones, stringing together incidents from his real-life experiences."

Ann Jacob of The Week gave a rating of 4 out of 5 and wrote," Jithu Madhavan, the director-writer of the movie, ensures that the pace of the plot does not lag at any point and has succeeded in leaving the audience wanting for more." Cris of The News Minute gave 4 out of 5 stars and wrote, "With such a package, the horror and the comedy come off really well. But if you are not quite a fan of horror, chances are that you might have trouble with the viewing, despite the comedy accompanying it."

Sajin Shirjith of The New Indian Express gave 4 out of 5 stars and wrote "Romancham is at its funniest when it explores the idiosyncrasies of its well-sketched character."

=== Box Office ===
Romancham grossed ₹4.35 crore in its first four days. It grossed ₹25 crore in 11 days with ₹17 crore from Kerala box office. The film collected ₹50 crore in 23 days with ₹30 crore from Kerala, ₹17 crore from overseas and ₹3 crore from other parts of India. The film grossed ₹62 crore in 34 days collecting ₹38 crore from Kerala, ₹21.15 crore from overseas market and ₹3.6 crore from other parts of India. It grossed ₹64 crore in 38 days grossing ₹39.35 crore from Kerala, ₹3.8 crore from other parts of India and ₹22 crore from overseas.

Romancham grossed over ₹68 crore after 50 days of its theatrical run by collecting ₹41 crore from Kerala, ₹4.1 crore from other parts of India and ₹22.9 crore from overseas market. Romancham grossed ₹70 crore worldwide to emerge as the fifth highest-grossing Malayalam film of the year.

== Remake ==
Hindi remake of the film titled Kapkapiii directed by Sangeeth Sivan was released on 23 May 2025.

== Sequel ==
The film ends with a hint of a possible sequel in the future. The director has stated that a sequel will only be pursued if the script can match the quality of Romancham, and that they will not proceed with the sequel for the sake of it.
