= Remya Suresh =

Indian film actress (born 1982)

- Born: 12 October 1982 (age 44); Kottayam, Kerala, India
- Education: K.G. College of Nursing
- Occupation: Actress
- Years active: 2018–present
- Parents: Purushothaman Nair; Rajalakshmi

Remya Suresh is an Indian actress who works in the Malayalam film industry. She made her debut in 2018 and gained recognition for her performance in Kuttanpillayude Sivarathri. Remya has since portrayed notable characters in several Malayalam films, including the critically acclaimed Njan Prakashan (2018), Paapam Cheyyathavar Kalleriyatte (2020), Yuvam (2021), Nizhal (2021), Jan. E. Man (2021), and Archana 31 Not Out (2022).

== Education ==
Remya Suresh earned a nursing degree from K.G. College of Nursing.

She first gained public attention for her role as Raji Maami in the 2018 Malayalam film Kuttanpillayude Sivarathri.

== Personal life ==
Remya Suresh married Suresh S. Nair on 1 January 2004. The couple has two children: a son, Navaneeth, and a daughter, Nivedhya.

== Filmography ==
Key
†	Denotes films that have not yet been released

- All films are in Malayalam, unless otherwise noted.

List of Remya Suresh film credits
Year	Title	Role	Notes	Ref.
2018	Kuttanpillayude Sivarathri	Raji Maami	Debut film	
2018	Njan Prakashan	Salomi's mother		
2019	Paapam Cheyyathavar Kalleriyatte	Stella		
2021	Yuvam	Ramani		
2021	Nizhal	Bhanu		
2021	Jan. E. Man	Nancy		
2022	Archana 31 Not Out	Vanaja		
2022	Malayankunju	Head Nurse		
2022	Sabaash Chandra Bose	Prameela		
2022	Visudha Mejo	Mejo's mother		
2022	Padavettu	Pushpa		
2022	Saudi Vellakka	Kala		
2022	1001 Nunakal	Indu		
2023	Christopher	Annie's mother		
2023	Aalankam	Seethamma		
2023	Vellari Pattanam	Yashoda		
2023	Pachuvum Athbutha Vilakkum	Sulochana		
2024	Aanandhapuram Diaries	Malini Mother		
2024	Vayasethrayaayi? Muppathiee..!!	Sakhavu Vanaja		
2024	Kunddala Puranam	Leela		
2024	Vettaiyan	Saranya's mother	Tamil film	
2025	Retro	Lakshmi	Tamil film	
2025	Randam Yaamam	Naniyamma		
2025	A Pan Indian Story	Beena		
2025	Sarkeet			
2025	Sirai	Abdul's mother	Tamil film	
2026	Sathyameva †	TBA	ZEE5 series	

== Issues ==
Remya Suresh filed a complaint after a deepfake pornographic video of her was leaked on social media. In an emotional Facebook post, she tearfully addressed the incident, stating that she had lodged a complaint with the Alappuzha Police and Cyber Cell. She wrote: "I am Remya Suresh. I have nothing to do with the video that is spreading on the internet. Legal action has been taken regarding the same video. Please don't spread it."
