= Vyasanasametham Bandhumithradhikal =

Indian Malayalam-language black comedy film

- Theatrical Release Poster
- Directed by: S. Vipin
- Written by: S. Vipin
- Produced by: Vipin Das; Sahu Garapati
- Starring: Anaswara Rajan; Siju Sunny; Joemon Jyothir; Mallika Sukumaran
- Cinematography: Rahim Aboobacker
- Edited by: Johnkutty
- Music by: Ankit Menon
- Production companies: WBTS Productions; Shine Screen
- Release date: 13 June 2025
- Running time: 114 minutes
- Country: India
- Language: Malayalam

Vyasanasametham Bandhumithradhikal is a 2025 Indian Malayalam-language black comedy film written and directed by S. Vipin featuring Anaswara Rajan, Siju Sunny and Joemon Jyothir in lead roles.

== Plot ==
Murali, a mild-mannered, small-town shopkeeper lives in the house of his mother-in-law, Savithriyamma, alongside his wife and daughter, Anjali.

Anjali is on the verge of a marriage fixing ceremony to Akhil, a controlling and deeply insecure police officer from Pandalam. Akhil openly disdains Anjali's local Thiruvananthapuram dialect and constantly micromanages her life—demanding call log screenshots and boundary-checking her every move. Under intense pressure from her emotionally baiting parents, Anjali feels overwhelmed and begins to deeply question the impending marriage.

Adding to the tension is Venu, a casteist local leader whom Murali highly respects. Venu alerts Murali that a Muslim youth named Suhail has been posting photos of Anjali on his WhatsApp statuses. Though Anjali clarifies that Suhail is simply a persistent college senior who has been tracking her, Murali's suspicions spiral.

Just days before the official engagement rituals can take place, Savithriyamma unexpectedly dies of a sudden heart attack.

The house filled with people who cared very little about Savithriyamma, and very much about themselves. Distant relatives arrived, putting on exaggerated, fake displays of weeping for the crowd before sneaking off to drink alcohol, gossip, and argue over the funeral logistics. A petty neighbor threw a tantrum, strictly forbidding the family from setting up the cremation pyre anywhere near their shared boundary line. Local politicians marched in, shamelessly trying to hijack the funeral arrangements to score points for their upcoming election campaigns.

The absurdity peaked when the villagers mistook Suhail’s friend, Shakthi, for a migrant laborer and forced him into doing hard funeral labor. To top it all off, a local music troupe next door began loudly blasting fast Tamil kuthu dance tracks for a rehearsal, completely drowning out the funeral chants. Through all of this madness, Anjali’s fiancé Akhil kept calling her phone—not to offer comfort, but to bitterly complain and control her from afar.

Watching her grandmother's body lie in the middle of a self-serving carnival was a massive wake-up call for Anjali. She saw the absolute hypocrisy of the villagers, her parents' crippling fear of "what society thinks," and Akhil's complete lack of empathy.

During a confrontation involving attending family members, neighbors, and guests during the funeral, Anjali confronted her family and canceled her planned marriage to Akhil, asserting her independence.

== Cast ==
- Anaswara Rajan as Anjali
- Siju Sunny as Suhail
- Joemon Jyothir as Shakthi
- Baiju Santhosh as Venu
- Azees Nedumangad as Murali
- Noby Marcose as Rajendran
- Mallika Sukumaran as Savithri Amma

== Production ==
The filming began on 15 November 2024 and wrapped on 28 December 2024. The film is written and directed by debutant S. Vipin. It is produced by Vipin Das and Sahu Garapati under the banners WBTS Productions Pvt Ltd and Shine Screen Cinema. The latter, Shine Screen Cinema, is a Telugu-based production house known for films like Bhagavanth Kesari and Majili. The cast features Anaswara Rajan, Siju Sunny, and Joemon Jyothir in lead roles, with supporting performances from Baiju Santhosh, Azees Nedumangad, Mallika Sukumaran, and Noby Marcose. The film's first look poster was unveiled on 12 March 2025, and it was released theatrically on 13 June 2025.

== Music ==
Vysana Sametham Bandhu Mithradhikal

Soundtrack album by Ankit Menon
- Released: July, 2025
- Genre: Feature film soundtrack
- Length: 6m 20s
- Label: Sony Music

The music is composed and arranged by Ankit Menon and the lyrics are penned by Vinayak Sasikumar. The promotional song "Majja Mood" is produced by Arcado and Abin Thomas and the lyrics is written by Black.

=== Track listing ===
No.	Title	Lyrics	Singer(s)	Length
1.	"Orma Thoppil"	Vinayak Sasikumar	Madhu Balakrishnan	4:40
2.	"Sambrani Penthiri"	Vinayak Sasikumar	Adheef Muhammad, Ankit Menon	3:20
Total length:				9:20

== Reception ==
The film received positive reviews from critics.

Gopika I. S. of The Times of India praised it as a "refreshing break" with "freshness and maturity" in direction, highlighting Anaswara Rajan's "brilliant" and "natural" performance and strong supporting cast.

Anandu Suresh of The Indian Express noted that Anaswara Rajan's dark comedy "mostly works," appreciating its "good humour," engaging plot, and effective emotional transitions, carried well by Anaswara Rajan.

Princy Alexander of Onmanorama highlighted its skilful handling of emotions during a funeral, blending comedy and social commentary, with Anaswara Rajan delivering a "commendable performance."

Nainu Oomen of The Hindu described it as a "well-executed satire on a funeral," praising its "quirky and unusual treatment," Vipin's humor without slapstick, and Anaswara Rajan's "subtle and nuanced portrayal."

== Controversy ==
In June 2025, a controversy arose around the film Vyasanasametham Bandhumithradhikal when its co-producer Vipin Das filed a police complaint against YouTube reviewer Bijith, the owner of YouTube channel Cinephile. The complaint, submitted to the Palarivattom police, alleged that Bijith had demanded money in exchange for providing a positive review of the film. Vipin claimed that when they declined the offer stating that the film was a low-budget production and had not allocated funds for paid promotions, the reviewer retaliated by publishing a negative review.

Vipin also handed over phone call details to the police as part of the evidence. He further stated in a press conference that complaints were submitted to FEFKA and the Producers’ Association, both of which expressed support for the filmmakers. The incident sparked a broader discussion on social media about ethics in online film reviewing and the pressure faced by small-budget films.
