= Noby Marcose =

Indian comedian and actor

- Born: Thiruvanthapuram, Kerala, India
- Occupations: Actor; comedian
- Spouse: Arya Noby (m. 2014)
- Children: 1

Noby Marcose is an Indian actor and comedian who works in Malayalam films and television. He is known for his roles in Pulimurugan (2016) and Madhura Raja (2019). He was a contestant in the third season of Bigg Boss Malayalam.

== Personal life ==
Noby Marcose was born in Thiruvananthapuram, Kerala, India. He married Arya Noby in 2014. The couple have one son, Dhyan born in 2016.

== Career ==
He began working as a comedian on stage shows, working with several ensemble groups performing comedy skits. He was paid ₹25 for his first show. Noby attained recognition after appearing in the TV reality show Comedy Stars on Asianet, his team emerged as the winners in the show. He was a contestant on the third season of Bigg Boss Malayalam.

== Filmography ==
=== Films ===
Year	Title	Role	Notes
2010	College Days	Parangandi	
2012	Husbands in Goa	Himself	
2013	Annum Innum Ennum	Pauly	
2014	Garbhasreeman	Pushpangathan	
2014	Ithihasa	Suresh	
2014	Njangalude Veettile Athidhikal	Lalu	
2014	Angry Babies in Love	Kochu Kunju	
2015	Life of Josutty	Geevarghese	
2015	She Taxi	Umesh Pisharadi	
2015	Ayal Njanalla	Sabu	
2015	Utopiayile Rajavu	Kattappuram Kuttappan	
2015	One Day		
2015	Ariyathe Ishtamayi		
2016	Smart Boys		
2016	Maalgudi Days	Security Guard	
2016	Dum		
2016	Pachakkallam		
2016	Pulimurugan	Benny	
2016	Ore Mukham	Sasi	
2016	Guppy	Onachan	
2016	Shikhamani		
2017	Neeranjanapookkal		
2017	Basheerinte Premalekhanam		
2017	Bobby	Shiju	
2017	Oru Visheshapetta Biriyani Kissa	Kunji Mrukan	
2017	Sherlock Toms	Madan Thulasi	
2017	Aadu 2	Police Constable	
2018	Sughamano Daveede		
2018	Naam	Kunjacko	
2018	Kuttanadan Marpappa	Brittas	
2018	Nervareenu Immani Cherinjoo Taa		
2018	Ennaalum Sarath..?	Dharman	
2019	Chila NewGen Nattuvisheshangal		
2019	Madhura Raja	Pothan	
2019	March Ramdam Vyzham		
2019	Mohabbathin Kunjabdulla		
2019	Oru Kadath Naadan Kaatha	Jabbar	
2019	Vattamesha Sammelanam		
2020	Uriyadi		
2022	Kenkemam	George	
2023	Kallanum Bhagavathiyum	Police Kumaran	
2023	Laika		
2023	Thaal		
2024	Vaazha – Biopic of a Billion Boys	Ebrahim	
2025	L Jagadamma Ezham Class B		
2025	916 Kunjoottan		
2025	Vyasanasametham Bandhumithradhikal	Rajendran	
2025	Behindd	Jiyo	
2025	Odum Kuthira Chaadum Kuthira	Principal	
2025	Innocent		
2025	Ambalamukkile Visheshangal		
2026	Ee Thani Niram		
2026	Sukhamano Sukhamann		
2026	Aadu 3	Policeman	
2026	Kalyanamaram		

=== Television ===
Year	Title	Role	Channel
2011–2014	Comedy Stars	Contestant	Asianet
2014	Cinema Chirima	Contestant	Mazhavil Manorama
2014	Kudumbapuranam		Jaihind TV
2016–2017	Laughing Villa	Mr.X	Surya TV
2016	Comedy Utsavam	Himself	Flowers
2017	Komedy Circus	Kukkumol	Mazhavil Manorama
2017–2019	Tamar Padar	Participant	Flowers TV
2018-2020	Comedy Stars	Various roles	Asianet
2018	Kumara Sambhavam	Chandran	Kaumudy TV
2018–2019	Comedy Masala	Mentor	Amrita TV
2019–2021	Star Magic	Participant	Flowers TV
2019-2020	Onam Uperi	Various roles	Asianet
2019	Nalla Best Family	Noby	Flowers TV
2020	Lockdown please	President	Flowers TV
2020	Quarantine Apparatus	Bombay Kishan	Kaumudy TV
2021	Bigg Boss Malayalam (Season 3)	Contestant	Asianet
2021	Onavillu	Himself	Asianet
2021	Minnum Tharam	Mentor	Asianet
2021-2022	Comedy Stars	Mentor	Asianet
2023	Star night with Maveli	Maveli	Asianet
2025-2026	Bumper Chiri Unlimited Chiri	Judge	Mazhavil Manorama
