= Painkili =

2025 film by Sreejith Babu

- Theatrical release poster
- Directed by: Sreejith Babu
- Written by: Jithu Madhavan
- Produced by: Fahadh Faasil; Jithu Madhavan
- Starring: Sajin Gopu; Anaswara Rajan
- Cinematography: Arjun Sethu
- Edited by: Kiran Das
- Music by: Justin Varghese
- Production companies: Urban Animal; Fahadh Faasil and Friends
- Distributed by: Bhavana Studios
- Release date: 14 February 2025
- Country: India
- Language: Malayalam
- Budget: ₹5 crore

Painkili (transl. Parrot) is a 2025 Indian absurdist romantic comedy film, written by Jithu Madhavan and directed by Sreejith Babu in his directorial debut. The film stars Sajin Gopu and Anaswara Rajan in lead roles. The film is jointly produced by actor Fahadh Faasil and director Jithu Madhavan.

It was released on 14 February 2025 (Valentine's Day). The film received mixed reviews from critics with praise for its music and story but criticism for its comedy and lack of good script.

== Plot ==
Sheeba, a young girl, tries desperately to escape her home in order to evade her marriage, which is fixed against her wishes by her parents. She attempts to elope and woo a local goon named Peter, hoping to use him to stand against her father, Baby, but all the plans backfire, and she is left without any option other than to return home.

Suku is a local graphic design shop owner. He is a hopeless romantic and despises his father, Sujithkumar, for giving him an old-fashioned name. Suku's best friends are Paachan, who looks up to him and Aneesh alias Kunjaayi, who runs an electric repair shop. His neighbour Suma, a nurse, has feelings for him, but he doesn't reciprocate, citing that she's like a sister to him, much to her dismay. One day, he sets out to Coimbatore with Paachan to purchase a new digital printer. While they're at a Lodge for the night, a thief tries to steal Suku's motorcycle bullet. The friends pursue the thief, and Suku ends up accidentally killing him. Suku and Paachan escape from Coimbatore that night back to their village. Suku is completely shaken and doesn't want to go to jail, so Paachan introduces him to his uncle Thanku, a petty criminal well-versed in criminal law and police procedure. Thanku scares him that he'll surely be caught in no time and advises him to fake insanity as a plea. For that, he refers him to a mental health institution in order to forge a certificate to present in court. Suku is forced to get admitted to the institution for 10 days to get the certificate, and in the meantime, his mother and her friends go on a leisure trip and pass by the institution and see Suku there as a patient. Soon, gossip spreads throughout the village that Suku has gone insane. 10 days later, he is released, and Paachan informs him that the case has been closed by the police as a hit-and-run incident, and they've escaped capture. When Suku returns, everyone, including his family, starts treating him as a mentally ill man despite his growing frustration.

Meanwhile, Sheeba woos Kunjaayi, and he decides to visit her house at night, where her pre-wedding celebrations are being held. He convinces a reluctant Suku to come along with him but things take a hilarious turn when Sheeba uses it as an opportunity to elope again, and Suku is forced to take her to his house to evade her angry parents and relatives. He believes Kunjaayi orchestrated the eloping, but to his shock, he gets to know that Kunjaayi had no intentions for any of this, and this was Sheeba's idea all along. He is now forced to let Sheeba stay at his house for the night, but hilarity ensues as she is found out by his family in the morning, and Sheeba tells them that she's Suku's girlfriend and has eloped with him, which his family happily accepts.

Suku, Paachan, Kunjaayi, and Suma start coming up with plans to get rid of Sheeba, but everything fails. They get to know that she is an orphan and her parents are actually her step-parents who desire to snatch away her inheritance by forcibly marrying her off. She wishes to complete her education and live freely, which doesn't sit well with them, and she's only playing this game won't go back to them. Forever a hopeless romantic, Suku falls for Sheeba and comes up with some cringeworthy attempts to impress her. A disgusted Sheeba ridicules Suku, who ends up having a mental breakdown. Meanwhile, Baby approaches Suku's house with a couple of goons with the intention of taking her away, but is forced to run away as a heartbroken Suku attacks them violently like an insane psycho. In the end, Suku discloses the truth to his family and swears that he will enrol Sheeba in a women's hostel and will take care of her education.

Now enrolled in a hostel, Sheeba gets to live the life that she's always desired and wishes to live off her inheritance, for which she'll be moving legally. She thanks Suku for his help and apologises to him for all the troubles he suffered because of her. Suku uses this opportunity to secretively confess his love for her again, only to get rejected once more. On the way back home, Suku, for the first time, acknowledges Suma's love for him and proposes to her, which she happily accepts.

== Cast ==
- Sajin Gopu as Suku Sujithkumar
- Anaswara Rajan as Sheeba Baby
- Jisma Vimal as Suma, a nurse
- Chandu Salim Kumar as Aneesh a.k.a. Kunjayi, Suku's friend
- Roshan Shanavas as Paachan, Suku's friend
- Abu Salim as Sujithkumar, Suku's father
- Lijo Jose Pellissery as Thanku, in a cameo appearance
- Riyaz Khan as Peter, Sheeba's ex-lover
- Aswathy B as Suku's sister
- Ambili Ayappan
- Pramod Kumar as Suku's Brother-in-law

== Soundtrack ==
Painkili

Soundtrack album by Justin Varghese
- Released: February 14, 2025
- Genre: Feature Film Soundtrack
- Length: 27m 40s
- Language: Malayalam
- Label: Think Music

=== Track listing ===
No.	Title	Singer(s)	Length
1.	"Baby Baby"	Lalitha Vijayakumar, Himna Hilari, Hinitha Hilary	4:03
2.	"Lola"	George Peter	4:51
3.	"Mama Meenakshi"	Neeraj Ramesh	2:06
4.	"Vazhkai"	Dhivyaraja Mazan	2:23
5.	"Haydole"	Himna Hilari, Hinitha Hilary	2:30
6.	"Lock Song"	George Peter, Sublahshni	4:01
7.	"Thetti"	Neeraj Ramesh	1:55
8.	"Heart Attack"	FEJO	3:18
9.	"Mad Suku"	Neeraj Ramesh	2:33
Total length:			27:40

== Marketing ==
The first look poster with the title of the film was released on 1 December 2024 with actor Sreejith Babu making his directorial debut. The second look poster was released on 20 January 2025.

The first single of the film, titled "Heart Attack", was released on 29 January 2025, with the tagline "A Justin Varghese Angioplasty". The song was written by Vinayak Sasikumar and sung by Fejo.

== Release ==
The film was released on 14 February 2025 in theatres. It started streaming on manoramaMAX on 11 April 2025.

== Reception ==
=== Critical reception ===
The film received mixed reviews from critics. Anna Mathews of The Times of India has rated the film 3 out of 5 stars, praising the soundtracks and camerawork but criticising about the character script and wrote: "Basically, the film seems to have woven together a bunch of crazy incidents - such as an early hospital scene that had audiences almost rofl-ing - which leads from one step to the next of the narrative, but throughout the film, you don't quite get the grip of what the film is about."

Princy Alexander of Onmanorama noted that Anaswara "does not seem too comfortable in the character as it requires her to be a little too loud" and the overdependence of friendship "sometimes affects the smooth flow of the film, making it less organic. The makers are too focused on ensuring that our lead guy has enough challenges in his way — giving him one heartache after another — that they forget to provide clarity on what is happening around him or to the characters who become part of his life."

Vignesh Madhu of The New Indian Express praised the actors' performance and the film's soundtracks, but stated that the film "lacks a strong emotional core" and "a lack of support from strong writing" and felt that "there isn't enough meat in [Ananswara's] character apart from some scattered hints about her desire to be independent." He wrote: "Painkili has a crazy energy which it maintains till the final 30 minutes when it pants hard to make it to the finishing point. A more nuanced approach to sketching the two primary characters and their inner turmoils could have benefited this otherwise entertaining film."

S.R. Praveen of The Hindu noted that the first single of the film, "Heart Attack", which became a hit and ensured audience's attraction in the film, but the film "gives the impression of something that was quickly cobbled up without much homework" and wrote: "The entire film gives the impression of something that was quickly cobbled up without much homework. ... Painkili is filled with lazily written characters with abrupt arcs and dead-end situations that do not evoke any excitement or anticipation. Even the lowbrow, cheesy pulp fiction of yesteryear that earned the catch-all branding of ‘Painkili’ had more heft than this film.

Anandu Suresh of The Indian Express rated the film 2.5/5 stars and praised the actors performance but criticised the script, felt "the characters and situations feel as though they have been inserted into preset jokes rather than emerging organically" and wrote: "Despite its flaws, the film remains watchable largely due to Sajin Gopu’s performance. Anaswara Rajan also does her best and delivers well in moments requiring restraint."
