= Joemon Jyothir =

Indian actor

- Occupation: Actor
- Years active: 2020–present

Joemon Jyothir is an Indian actor who works in the Malayalam film industry. He is known for his roles in Guruvayoor Ambalanadayil (2024) and Vaazha - Biopic of a Billion Boys (2024).

== Career ==
Joemon began his acting career making short YouTube sketches. He later got cast in a role in the comedy Gauthamante Radham (2020) and made his film debut in Romancham (2023).

== Filmography ==
Year	Title	Role	Notes	Ref.
2020	Gauthamante Radham			
2023	Romancham	DJ Babu	Debut film	
2023	Tholvi F.C.	Wannabe filmmaker		
2023	Falimy	Robin		
2024	Guruvayoor Ambalanadayil	Dr. George		
2024	Vaazha: Biopic of a Billion Boys	Muhammad Al Bin Salim Ibrahim (Musa)		
2024	Hello Mummy	Bichu		
2024	Parakramam	Vinod		
2025	Bazooka			
2025	Maranamass	Baby		
2025	Lovely			
2025	Vyasanasametham Bandhumithradhikal	Shakthi		
2025	Pet Detective	Sanoop		
2025	Innocent	Vaishakan		
2026	Aashaan	Anantharaman		
2026	Vaazha II: Biopic of a Billion Bros	Muhammad Al Bin Salim Ibrahim (Musa)	Cameo	
2026	Prempaatta †	Shahbaz		
