= Innocent (2025 film) =

2025 Indian-Malayalam language film

- Theatrical release poster
- Directed by: Satheesh Thanvi
- Screenplay by: Sarji Vijayan; Shihab Karunagappally; Satheesh Thanvi
- Story by: Shihab Karunagappally
- Produced by: M. Sreeraj AKD
- Starring: Althaf Salim; Joemon Jyothir; Anarkali Marikar
- Cinematography: Nikhil S. Praveen
- Edited by: Riyas K. Badhar
- Music by: Jay Stellar
- Production company: Elements of Cinema Entertainments
- Distributed by: Century Films
- Release date: 7 November 2025
- Running time: 124 minutes
- Country: India
- Language: Malayalam

Innocent is an Indian Malayalam-language comedy film directed by Satheesh Thanvi. The screenplay was co-written by Sarji Vijayan, Shihab Karunagappally, Satheesh Thanvi based on a story by Shihab. The film stars Althaf Salim, Joemon Jyothir, Anarkali Marikar, Kili Paul, Azees Nedumangad and Anna Prasad. It is produced by M. Sreeraj AKD under Elements of Cinema Entertainments. Nikhil S. Praveen handles the cinematography and Riyas K. Badhar edits the film. Jay Stellar composes the songs and background score.

The film was released worldwide on 7 November 2025.

== Cast ==
- Althaf Salim as Vinod Prashanthan
- Anarkali Marikar as Kavya Rajendran
- Joemon Jyothir as Vaishakan
- Kili Paul as African Vlogger
- Azees Nedumangad as Sreeraj Prashanthan
- Anna Prasad
- Mithun Ramesh as Bineesh
- Lakshmi Sanju as Sreeraj's Wife
- Sethu Lakshmi
- Poojappura Radhakrishnan as Basheer
- Noby Marcose as Ksrtc,Conducter
- Aswin Vijayan as Ratheesh
- Vineeth Thattil David Si Stephan Koshi
- Unni Lalu as Akbar
- Viji Thambi as Ramachandran
- Riyas Narmakala as Manoharan
- Adinadu Sasi as Prashanthan
- Dixon Poduthas as Opposition Leader Sudhakaran ValanjaVazhi
- Sujith Bhakthan as Transport Minister KY Anil
- Sanju Madhu
- Shylaja P Ambu as House Keeper
- Unnikannan Mangalamdam as Bus Passenger

== Music ==
Innocent

Soundtrack album by Jay Stellar
- Released: September 26, 2025
- Genre: Feature film soundtrack
- Length: 4:16

All music is composed by Jay Stellar.

No.	Title	Lyrics	Music	Singer(s)	Length
1.	"Summava"	Vinayak Sasikumar	Jay Stellar	Jassie Gift, Anarkali Marikar, Kili Paul	4:16
2.	"Anjanamani"	Traditional Song	Jay Stellar	Vaikom Vijayalakshmi	3:54

== Production ==
The film was launched on 26 May 2025 and soon principal photography began at Ernakulam and Thiruvananthapuram. Innocent is the second collaboration of Althaf Salim and Anarkali Marikar together after Mandakini along with Vineeth Thattil David.

== Release ==
The first look poster of the film was released online on 27 May 2025 after its title launch on previous day. The second look poster was released on 6 July 2025. The trailer of the film was released on 28 August 2025.

Innocent was released theatrically worldwide on 7 November 2025 by Century Films and Phars Film.

== Reception ==
=== Critical reception ===
Aiswarya Sudha of The Times of India rated the film 2.5/5 stars and wrote, "The film’s approach of pairing social issues with everyday humour and a subtle, non-preachy message sounds good. But on screen, it rarely catches fire. The writing is the weakest link. Many situations feel real, but the twists are predictable and the fixes are too easy. The film wants to show everyday pressures and how the system fails ordinary people, but it leans on coincidences and thin reasons. So, the 'social message' feels stuck on, not grown naturally from the story."
