= Parakramam (2024 Malayalam film) =

Malayalam language Indian film

- Directed by: Arjun Ramesh
- Written by: Arjun Ramesh
- Produced by: Harris Desom
- Starring: Dev Mohan; Sangita Madhavan Nair; Siju Sunny; Renji Panicker; Joemon Jyothir
- Cinematography: Salu K. Thomas
- Edited by: Kiran Das
- Music by: Anoop Nirichan
- Production company: Millennial Films
- Release date: 2024
- Country: India
- Language: Malayalam

Parakramam (transl. Struggle) is a 2024 Indian Malayalam language film written and directed by Arjun Ramesh featuring Dev Mohan, Sangita Madhavan Nair, Siju Sunny, Renji Panicker and Joemon Jyothir in lead roles.

== Plot ==
Vishakh grapples with self-doubt and bullying while navigating a strained relationship with his mother while he totally adores his father, Col. Sukumaran. Throughout his journey, he finds solace in the unwavering support of his friends and the blossoming of a sweet romance that helps him build confidence. However, certain turn of events in his life break him down before he turns into an army commando with a mission.

== Cast ==
- Dev Mohan as Vaishakh Sukumaran (Vichu)
- Siju Sunny as Balu
- Sangita Madhavan Nair as Savithri
- Sona Oliackal as Anupama
- Amith Mohan Rajeshwari as Manjesh
- Renji Panicker as Lt. Col. Sukumaran Nair
- Joemon Jyothir as Vinod
- Jeo Baby as Soman Pillai

== Soundtrack ==
Parakramam

Soundtrack album by Anoop Nirichan
- Released: November, 2024
- Genre: Feature film soundtrack
- Length: 23m 16s
- Language: Malayalam
- Label: 123Musix

The soundtrack is composed by Anoop Nirichan and lyrics are written by Suhail Koya, Renjith R. Nair and Arjun.

No.	Title	Singer(s)	Length
1.	"Kanmaniye"	Kapil Kapilan	3:59
2.	"Neeyan"	Jasim Jamal	3:37
3.	"Saaga Saptha"	Athira Janakan, Christakala, Kapil Kapilan, Jasim Jamal	4:09
4.	"En Uyire"	Lal Krishna, Amal, Athira Janakan, Christakala, Anoop Nirichan	3:09
5.	"Fearless Knight"	Anand Sreeraj	2:36
6.	"Isa Massiya"	Anoop Nirichan	3:04
7.	"Oh Makane"	Nevin C. Delson	1:58
Total length:			23:16
