= Prempaatta =

2026 Indian film

- Theatrical release poster
- Directed by: Aamir Pallikkal
- Written by: Lijeesh Kumar
- Produced by: Aamir Pallikkal; Ankit Menon
- Starring: Joemon Jyothir; Siddique; Saiju Kurup; Anusree
- Cinematography: Renadive
- Edited by: Akash Joseph Varghese
- Music by: Ankit Menon
- Production company: Studio Outsiders
- Distributed by: Central Pictures
- Release date: 27 November 2026
- Running time: 120 minutes
- Country: India
- Language: Malayalam

Prempaatta (transl. Love Bug)) is an upcoming Indian Malayalam-language romantic comedy film directed by Aamir Pallikkal and written by Lijeesh Kumar. Produced by Aamir Pallikkal and Ankit Menon under the banner Studio Outsiders, the film stars Joemon Jyothir with an ensemble supporting cast including VP Junaiz, Saafboi, Saiju Kurup, Siddique, Anusree, Rajesh Madhavan, and Sanju Sivaram.

The film is set against the backdrop of a college National Service Scheme (NSS) camp. The soundtrack and original score are composed by Ankit Menon.

== Plot ==
Set against the backdrop of a college National Service Scheme (NSS) camp, the film follows fifty students who travel to a remote village along the Kerala–Karnataka border. What begins as a routine campus outing filled with humor, friendship, and youth culture quickly takes a turn when a sweet romance blossoms between two campers, Shahbaz and Aliya. However, the lighthearted atmosphere is upended as the unique dynamics of the border village entangle the group in a series of unexpected twists, turning their camp experience into an unpredictable romantic comedy.

== Cast ==
- Joemon Jyothir as Shahbaz
- Saiju Kurup as Akash Vellathooval
- Anusree as Nandini Miss
- Rajesh Madhavan as VKP
- Sanju Sivram as Akbar
- Siddique as Ex-Military Thomas
- Saafboi as Tinu Thampi
- Junaiz V P as Sainu
- Nayana Elsa as Aishwarya
- Shamla Hamza as Aliya's Mother
- Tiss Thomas as TT
- Irshad Ali as Principal
- Thesni Khan as Shahbaz's Mother
- Aneesh Gopal as Staff Secretary
- Bibin Perumbillikunnel as Karate Sunny
- Sanesh Guinness as Anand Master

== Production ==
=== Development ===
The project was officially announced in 2026 as a youth-centric romantic entertainer directed by Aamir Pallikkal, following his previous directorial ventures Ayisha (2023) and ED - Extra Decent. The story, screenplay, and dialogues were written by author Lijeesh Kumar. The film marks one of the debut productions under the banner Studio Outsiders, jointly produced by Pallikkal and music composer Ankit Menon.

=== Filming ===
Principal photography for the film officially commenced on 27 March 2026 in Kozhikode following a traditional pooja and switch-on ceremony. Actress Mamta Mohandas attended the launch event as a special guest alongside the primary cast and crew members. The production team planned a 45-day principal photography schedule, with major filming schedules set across various locations in Kozhikode and Thrissur.

The technical team involved during filming includes cinematographer Renadive, editor Akash Joseph Varghese, production designer Anees Nadodi, and costume designer Sameera Saneesh. Action sequences were choreographed by stunt master Kalai Kingson, while dance sequences were directed by Prasanna Master. Sound design during production was handled by Vishnu Sujathan.

== Music ==
The original background score and songs are composed by Ankit Menon. Lyrics for the songs are penned by Suhail M. Koya, and Muthu.

== Release ==
Prempaatta was initially scheduled for a theatrical release in October 2026. However, the release was rescheduled, and the film is set to release in theatres on 27 November 2026. The theatrical distribution rights for Kerala were acquired by Central Pictures.
