= Pooja Mohanraj =

Indian film and theatre actress

- Born: Pondicherry, India
- Education: Lady Shri Ram College for Women; School of Drama, College of Fine Arts, Thrissur; Intercultural Theatre Institute, Singapore
- Occupations: Actress; theatre director; theatre educator
- Years active: 2021–present
- Known for: Malayalam cinema and theatre
- Notable work: Aavesham, Sookshmadarshini, Romancham, Neelavelicham, Kaathal – The Core

Pooja Mohanraj is an Indian film and theatre actress, director, and educator who works primarily in Malayalam cinema. She began her theatre career at the age of ten as a member of Lokadharmi, the theatre group led by Prof. Chandradasan, and went on to train extensively in both Eastern traditional performance forms and contemporary Western acting techniques. She made her film debut with the Malayalam film One (2021) and gained wider recognition for her performances in films such as Romancham, Neelavelicham, Kaathal – The Core, Aavesham, and Sookshmadarshini.

== Early life and education ==
Pooja Mohanraj was born in Pondicherry, India, to Usha Mohanraj and K. Mohanraj, a mechanical engineer. She spent her early childhood in Pondicherry and Muscat, before her family relocated to Kerala. She completed her schooling at Bhavan's Adarsha Vidyalaya, Ernakulam.

Her introduction to theatre came at the age of ten, when her mother enrolled her in the children's theatre wing of Lokadharmi, a theatre group founded by Prof. Chandradasan in Kochi.

Pooja graduated with a degree in Economics (Honours) from Lady Shri Ram College for Women, University of Delhi. She subsequently obtained a Master's degree in Theatre Arts from the School of Drama and Fine Arts, University of Calicut (at the College of Fine Arts, Thrissur). She also holds a Professional Diploma in Intercultural Theatre (Acting) from the Intercultural Theatre Institute (ITI) in Singapore, a three-year full-time acting programme where she trained in Eastern traditional performance forms and contemporary Western acting techniques. She graduated from ITI in 2018 as a recipient of the ITI International Scholarship.

== Career ==
=== Theatre ===
Prior to her formal training at ITI, Pooja trained under theatre practitioners including G. Venu, David Zinder, and Chandradasan, and attended workshops conducted by Richard Schechner and Alex Pinder. She has worked with directors such as Aarne Neeme, Sankar Venkateswaran, Chandradasan, Kumara Varma, Neel Chaudhuri, and Sasidharan Naduvil.

Her notable theatre productions include Egle and Cleopatra (a solo play written and directed by Chandradasan, based on Lithuanian myth and Shakespeare's Antony and Cleopatra), When We Dead Awaken, Andorra, and Balcony. These productions were staged at festivals including the Bharat Rang Mahotsav, International Theatre Festival of Kerala, Ekaharya Theatre Festival, META Festival, Old World Theatre Festival, and Surya Festival.

She directed her first play, Sorry Dad but I Have To, for the Collegiate Theatre Festival for New German Writing organised by the Goethe-Institut/Max Mueller Bhavan in New Delhi. Her solo performance Straitjacket was presented at the Singapore Writers Festival in 2018. While in Singapore, she also performed in Pathey Nimidam, a Tamil theatre festival organised by the Ravindran Drama Group.

She has undertaken international collaborative projects, including The Bowl Project with multidisciplinary artists from South Korea and The Eleven Project with French artists. She was awarded the Scholarship for Young Artistes by the Ministry of Culture, Government of India, for training in theatre.

Beyond performing, Pooja has been involved in organising several editions of the International Theatre Festival of Kerala in various capacities. She also founded Talir, an arts and cultural organisation aimed at using theatre as a tool for social change. She facilitates theatre-in-education programmes in schools and colleges across Kerala and developed Attune, a training module adapted for virtual spaces, designed for both actors and non-actors.

=== Film ===
Pooja made her film debut in 2021 with One, directed by Santhosh Viswanath, in which she played a civil police officer. The same year, she appeared in the thriller Cold Case.

In 2023, she appeared in several films, including Romancham directed by Jithu Madhavan, Neelavelicham directed by Aashiq Abu, and Kaathal – The Core directed by Jeo Baby.

In 2024, she appeared in Aavesham, also directed by Jithu Madhavan and starring Fahadh Faasil, in which she played the role of Beauty. The film was a major commercial success. She was also part of Sookshmadarshini, starring Basil Joseph and Nazriya Nazim.

In 2025, she appeared in Oru Jaathi Jathakam, Maranamass, and Padakkalam, further establishing herself as a consistent presence in Malayalam cinema. She also spoke at the Summit of Future 2025 hosted by Jain University in Kochi on the topic of stereotypes in Malayalam cinema.

== Filmography ==
Key
†	Denotes films that have not yet been released

=== Films ===
Year	Title	Role	Notes	Ref.
2021	One	Civil Police Officer		
2021	Cold Case	Neela Maruthan		
2022	Freedom Fight	Sajna	Segment: "Asangadithar"	
2022	Naradan	Shafeena		
2023	Romancham	Maala		
2023	Iratta	SCPO Amrutha		
2023	Purusha Pretham	Home Nurse		
2023	Neelavelicham	Suma		
2023	Kaathal – The Core	Thankan's sister		
2024	Manjummel Boys	Studio girl		
2024	Aavesham	Beauty	Nominated for Best Actor in Supporting Role (Female) Filmfare South	
2024	Gangs of Sukumarakurup			
2024	Sookshmadarshini	Asma		
2025	Oru Jaathi Jathakam	Latha		
2025	Maranamass	Annie		
2025	Padakkalam	Shobha		
2025	Paathirathri	Beat Forest Officer		
2026	Magic Mushrooms	Anitha		

=== Web series ===
Year	Title	Role	Platform	Notes	Ref.
2023	Masterpeace	Rashmitha	Disney+ Hotstar		
2026	Akka	Deju	Netflix		

== See also ==
- Malayalam cinema
- Lokadharmi
- Intercultural Theatre Institute
