= Maranamass =

- Theatrical release poster
- Directed by: Sivaprasad
- Screenplay by: Siju Sunny; Sivaprasad
- Story by: Siju Sunny
- Produced by: Tovino Thomas; Tingston Thomas; Rapheal Pozholiparambil; Thanzeer Salam
- Starring: Basil Joseph; Anishma Anilkumar; Siju Sunny; Suresh Krishna; Babu Antony; Rajesh Madhavan
- Cinematography: Neeraj Revi
- Edited by: Chaman Chakko
- Music by: JK
- Production companies: Tovino Thomas Productions; Rapheal Productions; World Wide Films
- Release date: 10 April 2025
- Running time: 141 minutes
- Country: India
- Language: Malayalam
- Box office: ₹19.50 crore

Maranamass is a 2025 Indian Malayalam language psychological black comedy film written and directed by Sivaprasad in his directorial debut. The film stars Basil Joseph, Siju Sunny, Rajesh Madhavan, Suresh Krishna, Anishma Anilkumar and Babu Antony. It is jointly produced by actor Tovino Thomas and his brother Tingston Thomas under his banner Tovino Thomas Productions along with Raphael Pozholiparambil of Raphael Productions and Thanzeer Salam of Worldwide Films.

It was released on 10 April 2025, coinciding with Vishu to mixed reviews from critics.

== Plot ==
Kerala is gripped in fear as a serial killer starts kidnapping old men, hammering them to death and dumping their dead bodies with a banana stuffed in their mouths. Nicknamed the 'Banana Killer', he becomes the subject of a statewide manhunt spearheaded by top cop Ajay Ramachandran who is distraught about the disappearance of his beloved dog, Pakru. The police zero in on a suspect, a young man named Luke P.P who is considered a dreaded menace to society by the people of Vallikkunnu, his village. Suspicions of the police about Luke being the killer is cleared off by the people who are crowdfunding a trip for him to Czech Republic in order to get rid of him. Luke's penchant to troublemaking and him being suspected of being the killer leads to him getting dumped by his girlfriend Jessy, a kickboxer.

Keshava Kuruppu, a perverted old man is dropped off at an old age home by his son after he misbehaves with his son's wife. Incidentally, Kuruppu is also the last target of the serial killer who is revealed as Sreekumar alias SK, a government official who is hell-bent on revenge fuelled by some past deed of his victims. He frantically searches for Kuruppu to no avail but to his luck, Kuruppu after freshly escaping the old age home ends up right in front of him in a bar where he has been drinking. SK takes him along with him and boards a bus which Jessy also happens to be in. As night falls, all the passengers are dropped off except Jessy, SK and Kuruppu who remain along with the crew of the bus including the driver Jithin Kumar alias Jikku, a soon-to-be groom and the conductor Aravindan alias Aruvi, whose father went missing 20 years ago. Kuruppu harasses Jessy who sprays pepper on him but the old man dies instantly of as an asthma attack ensues, triggered by it. SK is disappointed as his opportunity for revenge is lost but offers to claim responsibility for a meager amount of money and dispose off the body which everyone agrees to. While all this is happening, the police work out that the victims have all been working together as insurance agents in the past and Kuruppu will be the next target. They find out that Kuruppu has escaped the old age home and initiates a search for him. In the CCTV footage of the old age home while determining how Kuruppu was kidnapped, Ramachandran spots Pakru with Kuruppu.

Meanwhile, Luke, who had been tailing Jessy to confront her about the break-up intercepts and boards the bus, only to realise that he has landed in deep trouble but decides to help out Jessy. He expresses suspicions about SK and his offer to dispose the body without any serious incentive. Luke comes up with a plan to barge in to the local cemetery and lay the body inside the tomb of a young swimmer whose funeral had happened just that day. Luke smokes a joint on Kuruppu's person and gets high. As they lay the body to rest, Aruvi notices a tattoo on its chest and realises that it was a rare tattoo only he and father had concluding that Kuruppu is his long lost father who had left him when he was a child. Overcome by emotion, Aruvi demands the corpse be cremated properly in accordance to funerary rites. The group obliges hesitantly, drops the plan and boards the bus with the body which irks SK who reveals his true identity as the Banana Killer. He threatens to kill them all and when the police stops the vehicle on the road, he escapes with the corpse. Luke discloses that when he was high, he clothed the body using his jacket which has his picture on it and once the body is discovered the next day, the police are surely going to come after him suspecting him to be the killer. Angrily, Jikku slaps Luke and Jessy inadvertently hurts him by saying that he is disturbing her after the villagers and he created all the problems. A heartbroken Luke says that he was only trying to help the villagers, but they thought that he has a bully and Jessy is now doing the same.

The police comes to know that Kuruppu was seen travelling alongside Luke from a child who had boarded the bus earlier and confirms him to be the Banana Killer, declaring a bounty of ten lakhs for his capture. Luke gets to know of this and decides to take the blame on himself and save Jessy while allowing the others to escape. Jessy apologises to him and bids an emotional and tearful goodbye to him. Luke encounters Pakru coincidentally and realizes he is a missing dog. He rings up Ramachandran and lets him know that he has found Pakru, not realizing that he was a cop in charge of the Banana Killer investigation. He waits for the police to find and arrest him but deduces that SK took the body to a nearby junkyard by viewing drone footage from a couple dressed as a ghost and vampire who happened across his path to film their save-the-date video. Despite everyone trailing him to catch him and collect the bounty, he successfully evades them by taking Pakru hostage and reaches the junkyard and fights of SK who takes the upper hand. He is saved when Jessy, Jikku and Aruvi arrive on time and in the resulting clash, SK ends up getting pepper sprayed by Jessy and Luke overpowering him. After getting the killer under control, the couples reunite and they help Aruvi perform the last rites and cremation of his father in the junkyard itself. SK frees himself from his restraints and drags out the burning body from the pyre and sets the junkyard on fire in the process but this is witnessed by the townsfolk and the police. SK is arrested by the police as the Banana Killer, thereby clearing Luke's name. Luke's reputation also changes for the better thanks to everything and he decides to stay in India, resuming his relationship with Jessy. Later while visiting a temple, Aruvi spots the exact same tattoo he has on his chest on many people and realizes that it is not a rare tattoo that only him and his father shared, clearly hinting that Kuruppu was not his father. He however decides to believe Kuruppu was his long lost father.

Meanwhile, SK's motives are revealed to the public by the media. His father used to be the coworker of the victims long back and they all used to live together. Once while he was away, due to the rat infestation in the house they set up bananas filled with rat poison. When he came back, he consumed one of these bananas unknowingly and died as a result. After his death, his wife - SK's mother committed suicide as well triggering him to swear revenge on the men responsible for his loss.

== Cast ==
- Basil Joseph as Luke P P
- Anishma Anilkumar as Jessy
- Siju Sunny as Aravindan K. "Aruvi"
- Babu Antony as DySP Ajay Ramachandran
- Suresh Krishna as Jithin Kumar C. "Jikku"
- Rajesh Madhavan as Sreekumar "SK", a serial killer
- Joemon Jyothir as Baby
- Pooja Mohanraj as Annie
- Puliyanam Poulose as Keshava Kurup
- Dheeraj Denny as Sumesh Kurup
- Alexander Prasanth as SI "Tiger" Sam K D
- Sunil Sukhada as Kochuvava
- Jeo Baby as Jessy's dad
- Vijay Ajith as Journalist
- Kudassanad Kanakam as Jessy's grandmother
- Nadira Mehrin as Anganwadi teacher
- M. R. Gopakumar as Doctor
- Santhosh Keezhattoor as Death man, killed by Sreekumar
- Naga Sairandhri as Lalitha, Jikku's fiancee (voice and photo appearance)
- Tovino Thomas as Puthanthottil Umesh, dead swimmer (cameo)
- Guru Somasundaram as a Tattoo artist in Rameshwaram (cameo)

== Production ==
The film was announced on 9 April 2024 by actor Tovino Thomas, who co-produced the film. The film has a tagline as 'Not a mass padam'. The first look poster of the film was released on Valentine's Day, 14 February 2025 with lead actor Basil Joseph appearing as a funky haired sigma male. Actor Siju Sunny, apart from writing the story, has also written the dialogues along with the film's director Shivaprasad. Neeraj Revi was roped in as cameraman while Jay Unnithan was assigned for music. The makers also signed veteran actor Babu Antony as DYSP Ajay Ramachandran, who takes over the investigation of serial killings that form the crux of the story. After playing the female lead in I Am Kathalan, Anshima Anilkumar plays the female lead with Basil Joseph. The promo video of the film with Basil pokes fun at a popular news anchor in Kerala was released on 13 March 2025. The trailer of the film was released on 2 April 2025. In an interview, screenwriter Siju Sunny said, "It is exhilarating to see the characters one has created, coming alive on screen", concluding it as a, "priceless feeling".

== Release ==
=== Theatrical ===
The film was theatrically released on 10 April 2025.

=== Home media ===
The film will begin streaming on SonyLIV from 15 May 2025 in Malayalam and dubbed versions of Hindi, Tamil, Telugu and Kannada languages.

== Reception ==
Marana Mass received mixed reviews from critics. Writing for Onmanorama, Princy Alexander wrote,"Most films on serial killers often take the dark route. But in 'Maranamass', directed by debutant Shivaprasad and headlined by Basil Joseph, there is no space for such fear even when an entire village knows that a serial killer is out on the loose. Instead, the makers weave in trunk loads of confusion and chaos, giving you a story that has plenty to laugh about." Rating the film 3/5, Avinash Ramachandran of The Indian Express wrote, "The crowning moment of Maranamass is the way things are finally given a closure, and it doesn’t make us go all gaga over it, but just give it a cursory nod as if we understand why SK did what he did. The film pulls us in right from the first frame, and even when there are moments when the grip loosens, it gets a hold at just the right times. And, in a film as grey, over-the-top, and blasphemous as Maranamass, the laughs keep on coming, and it just makes you wish they had just gone crazier with the premise in hand. Now, that would have been a kola mass too." Janani K of India Today rated the film 3/5 mentioning,"Maranamass is yet another great attempt at dark comedy from Malayalam cinema. While there are drawbacks, the performances and the quirky characters make it an enjoyable affair." In her review for The News Minute, Sukanya Shaji praised the performances of the cast whilst criticising the screenplay in the second half for being disjointed. Sanjith Sidhardhan of OTTPlay rated the film 3/5 mentioning,"Basil Joseph's dark comedy, though packed with laughs, works only in parts. However, the film is a breezy watch if you want to enjoy the Vishu weekend, leaving all the care behind."
