= Guruvayoor Ambalanadayil =

2024 Indian film

- Theatrical release poster
- Directed by: Vipin Das
- Written by: Deepu Pradeep
- Produced by: Supriya Menon; Mukesh R. Mehta; C. V. Sarathi
- Starring: Prithviraj Sukumaran; Basil Joseph; Nikhila Vimal; Anaswara Rajan
- Cinematography: Neeraj Revi
- Edited by: Johnkutty
- Music by: Ankit Menon
- Production companies: Prithviraj Productions; E4 Entertainment
- Distributed by: AP International
- Release date: 16 May 2024
- Running time: 135 minutes
- Country: India
- Language: Malayalam
- Budget: est.₹40 crore
- Box office: est.₹90.25 crore

Guruvayoor Ambalanadayil (transl. In front of Guruvayoor Temple) is a 2024 Indian Malayalam-language comedy film directed by Vipin Das, written by Deepu Pradeep and jointly produced by Prithviraj Productions and E4 Entertainment. The film stars Prithviraj Sukumaran, Basil Joseph, Nikhila Vimal and Anaswara Rajan. The story revolves around a marriage happening at Guruvayur Temple and a friendly bonding between Anandan and Vinu, two soon-to-be brothers-in-law.

The film was released on 16 May 2024, and received positive reviews from critics, praising the cast performances (especially Prithviraj Sukumaran, Basil Joseph, Nikhila Vimal and Anaswara Rajan), humour, music, story, visuals, and climax and emerged as a commercial success at the box office, becoming as one of the highest-grossing Malayalam films of all time and 7th highest grossing Malayalam film of 2024.

== Plot ==
Vinu Ramachandran is a young executive working in Dubai. He is engaged to Anjali and forms a close acquaintance with her brother, Anandan, who works as a plant manager at a factory in Jamshedpur. It has been five years since Vinu's breakup with his ex-girlfriend, Parvathy but he still hasn't been able to move on. Anandan coaches Vinu in overcoming his feelings of betrayal. However, Anandan is also not leading a perfectly happy life, as he is temporarily separated from his wife who is also named Parvathy, after an anonymous letter slandering her had arrived to Anandan. Vinu, who now considers Anandan as the brother he never had, takes it upon himself to ensure happiness in Anandan's life and helps him reunite with Parvathy.

However, things go haywire when Vinu and Anandan meet in-person for the first time as it turns out that the Parvathy in both of their lives is the same person. Initially, Vinu tries to stop the wedding due to the awkward situation with the help of his friends, his brother and his colleague Kunjunni. However, Kunjunni backs out since Anandan is his friend from school, and he doesn't want to get involved. Later Vinu, after talking with Anjali, realizes their happiness is what matters, and decides to proceed with the wedding. Meanwhile, Anandan learns that Vinu's ex-girlfriend is his own wife. Thinking that the love letter sent to Parvathy was sent by Vinu, he immediately sets out to stop the wedding.

Kunjunni meanwhile decides to help Vinu and tries to ruin the wedding, but an angry Vinu slaps him, leading to Kunjunni joining Anandan's side to try to stop the wedding. Anandan tries to stop the wedding with the help of his uncles, who turns out are in a direct fight with Anandan's father Sudevan and have their own agenda to create problems. Meanwhile, Vinu's old friend turned enemy, Saravanan, whose marriage he had ruined unintentionally, as well as a stalker, George, who used to follow Anjali, try to stop the wedding by themselves.

Finally, on the day of the wedding, Anandan gets closure after talking with Parvathy and her father as well as his own parents and realises that they had known about Parvathy and Vinu long ago, but they hid the truth from him, to protect him. He also realises that the anonymous love letter sent to Parvathy was sent by his own uncles to create a rift in the family. After learning the truth and realising his mistake, Anandan trashes up Saravanan, George and Kunjunni as well as his uncles and their goons and proceeds to prevent any disruption to the wedding. Finally, Vinu marries Anjali amidst all the chaos and makes peace with Parvathy. The story ends happily with Vinu and Anjali, as well as Anandan and Parvathy, happy together.

== Cast ==
- Prithviraj Sukumaran as Anandan Sudevan, Vinu's brother-in-law and Anjali's brother
- Basil Joseph as Kaitholaparambil Vinu Ramachandran, Anandan's brother-in-law
- Nikhila Vimal as Parvathy, Anandan's wife and Vinu's ex-girlfriend
- Anaswara Rajan as Anjali Sudevan, Anandan's sister, Parvathy's sister-in-law and Vinu's fiancée later wife
- Yogi Babu as Saravanan, Vinu's friend
- Siju Sunny as Shamsudheen, Vinu's friend
- Saaf as Kaitholaparambil Anirudhan "Ani" Ramachandran, Vinu's younger brother
- Jagadish as Sudevan, Anandan's and Anjali's father and Vinu's and Parvathy's father-in-law
- Rekha as Raji Sudevan, Sudevan's wife, Anandan's and Anjali's mother and Vinu's and Parvathy's mother-in-law
- P.P. Kunhikrishnan as Kaitholapparambil Ramachandran, Vinu's and Ani's father and later Anjali's father-in-law
- Usha Chandrababu as Latha Ramachandran, Vinu's and Ani's mother and Anjali's later mother-in-law
- Baiju Santhosh as Dr. Purushothaman, Parvathy's father and Anandan's father-in-law
- Priya Sreejith as Nandini, Purushothaman's wife, Parvathy's mother and Anandan's mother-in-law
- Kottayam Ramesh as Sreedharan (Valiyammavan), Raji's elder brother
- Irshad as Murali (Cheriyammavan), Raji's younger brother
- Kudassanad Kanakam as Ramani
- Joemon Jyothir as Dr. George, Anjali's stalker
- Akhil Kavaliyoor as Kunjunni, Vinu's colleague and Anandan's friend
- Aswin Vijayan as Mayinkutty V, Vinu's friend
- Noah Nishin as Appoos, Anandan's and Parvathy's son
- Aju Varghese as singer at Guruvayur Temple (cameo appearance)
- Aravind Akash as Unnikrishnan (special appearance)

== Production ==
=== Development ===
The story was narrated to Prithviraj Sukumaran by screenwriter Deepu Pradeep. Initially, Prithviraj was supposed to portray the role of Vinu. Initially, another director was supposed to direct the film before being replaced by Vipin Das. Announcement of the film came on January 1, 2023, by Prithviraj Sukumaran revealing that this was a story that he heard it over a year ago. Collaborating with Basil Joseph, the film would be directed by Vipin Das after the success of Jaya Jaya Jaya Jaya Hey, and is written by Deepu Pradeep associating with E4 Entertainment. The film will feature Ankit Menon as the music director, Neeraj Revi as the cinematographer and John Kutty as editor. In March 2023, in an interview Baiju Santosh said that Prithviraj Sukumaran will be playing an antagonistic character in the film.

=== Casting ===
The film marks the first collaboration of Prithviraj Sukumaran and Basil Joseph. Comedian Yogi Babu, was cast to play a role making his Malayalam cinema debut with the film. He joined the cast on April 9, 2023. Female leads were Nikhila Vimal and Anaswara Rajan; both of them joining the set on April 15, 2023. Billed as a fun entertainer revolving around the events surrounding a wedding, the film would also have Siju Sunny, Saaf, Joemon Jyothir, Jagadish, Rekha, Priya Sreejith, Irshad and P. P. Kunhikrishnan in other roles.

=== Filming ===
Principal photography began on 12 May 2023 with a puja and switch on ceremony taking place at the Guruvayoor Temple. A set replicating the Guruvayur Temple was constructed at Karattupallikkara in Perumbavoor municipality. The second schedule of filming underwent in Dubai and concluded in early July. Prithviraj was supposed to join the filming during the third schedule, but it was delayed due to an injury sustained on the sets of Vilayath Buddha. He eventually joined the film in the last week of November in Guruvayur. The fourth schedule was concluded in Kochi by early January 2024. The entire filming was wrapped up on 4 April 2024.

== Music ==
The music and background score was composed by Ankit Menon with lyrics written by Vinayak Sasikumar, Suhail Koya, Asal Kolaar and Dabzee. The album was released on 30 May 2024 under the Saregama label.

== Release ==
=== Theatrical ===
The film was released in theatres on 16 May 2024.

=== Home media ===
The post-theatrical streaming rights of the film were bought by Disney+ Hotstar and started streaming from 27 June 2024, and the satellite rights by Asianet.

== Reception ==
=== Critical reception ===
On the review aggregator website Rotten Tomatoes, 60% of 5 critics' reviews are positive, with an average rating of 5/10.

Arjun Menon of Rediff.com rated 3.5/5 stars and observed, "Guruvayoorambala Nadayil is a no-holds-barred, silly comedy that will keep you glued to the screen even when the going gets tough towards the end but the smile on your face will not leave."

S. R. Praveen of The Hindu wrote, "Guruvayoor Ambalanadayil, which initially rides high on the novelty of the bromance and their humorous exchanges, finally ends up as quite average fare."

Anandu Suresh of The Indian Express wrote, " The most impressive aspect of the Vipin Das directorial is the on-screen chemistry between Prithviraj Sukumaran and Basil Joseph, who set the screen ablaze whenever they appear together with their remarkable handling of humour." Janani K of India Today rated 2.5/5 and wrote, " Guruvayoor Ambalanadayil' is a passable entertainer that has several moments that will have you laughing along with some shortcomings.

Gopika Is of The Times of India rated 3/5 and wrote, " The Nandanam shoutout was cool but somehow the impact was lacking as it progressed. When Aravind Akash shows up on screen, the nostalgia element shoots up but when we reach the part where Anandan does an Unnimaya, it falls flat not because it was done poorly but by then the climax had already stretched on for too long. Ankit Menon's music boosts the energy of the film up, adding to the drama.

Vishal Menon of Film Companion wrote, "A Fun Modern-Day Priyadarshan Comedy About A Flawed Modern Mallu Family".

Latha Srinivasan of Hindustan Times wrote, " Guruvayoor Ambalanadayil is a complete laugh riot, coupled with splendid performances, that families will thoroughly enjoy. Prithviraj Sukumaran has another winner on his hands.

Swathi P. Ajith of Onmanorama wrote, "Guruvayoor Ambalanadayil' is a delightful family entertainer that guarantees laughter. For a delightful experience with family or friends, this movie is the perfect choice. "

=== Box office ===
The film grossed over ₹50 crore at the box office within a week of its release. It concluded its run with worldwide gross estimated to be ₹90.25 crore.
