= Uru (2023 film) =

2023 Malayalam film by E. M. Ashraf

- Theatrical release poster
- Directed by: E. M. Ashraf
- Written by: E. M. Ashraf
- Produced by: Mansoor Palloor
- Starring: Mamukkoya; Manju Pathrose
- Cinematography: Sreekumar Permbadavam
- Edited by: Hari G. Nair
- Music by: Kamal Prashanth
- Production company: Zams Production House
- Distributed by: 72 Film Company
- Release date: 3 March 2023
- Running time: 97 minutes
- Country: India
- Language: Malayalam

Uru (transl. Dhow) is a 2023 Indian Malayalam-language drama film written and directed by E. M. Ashraf. It features Mamukkoya, Manju Pathrose and Manoj K. U. in the lead roles. The film follows the story of an expatriate who was assigned to the supervision of Uru construction in Beypore and the challenges he meets during its manufacturing.

The principal photography took place in Beypore and Mahe. Uru was released in theatres on 3 March 2023.

== Plot ==
Rashid is an expat who has spent several years working in the Gulf. He and his wife Ayisha have two children: the eldest son, Fatah, and the youngest daughter, Fasna. Rashid's Arbab has assigned him the construction of two Uru. He wants his son to join him in the construction of Uru, but Fatah is more interested in music. After returning from the Gulf, Rashid visits the Uru construction site and meets the head carpenter, Sreedharan Aashari, and other carpenters. Rashid's friend Assainar approaches him one day with a desire to make him a partner in Uru construction. But Rashid tells him that Arbab will not consent to this.

Meanwhile, Fatah's friend Alwyn is hospitalized due to drug addiction, and an inspector from the Beypore police station visits Fatah's house and questions his friends about him. Rashid is concerned about the delay in receiving money for the Uru construction. The police inspector visits the construction site and informs Rashid that Fatah should appear at the police station the next day. Rashid comes home upset, gets angry with Fatah, and beats him. Sreedharan, on the other hand, is struggling to properly pay the carpenters. The carpenters decide to stop Uru's construction since they have not received their wages on time. Sreedharan tells his problems to Achuthan, the assistant head carpenter.

Rashid learns of Arbab's death over the phone one day, which worsens his health problems. Sreedharan meets Rashid at home and takes him to Uru yard. Rashid tells Sreedharan about his struggles and financial problems. Sreedharan informs Fatah about Rashid's financial problems and that his house is going to be confiscated. Bhaskaran, the owner of the timber mill, comes to Rashid's house and asks him to return the amount of timber bought for the construction of Uru. Rashid tells Ayisha that he returned the money to Bhaskaran by pledging the house. Rashid approaches Assainar and requests financial assistance, but he refuses. Rashid also meets his friend Sakkir but does not receive the expected financial assistance.

Rashid meets with the bank manager to talk about the loan he took. But the manager informs him that the amount has increased significantly, including the interest, and the next day Rashid's house will be confiscated. At night, Rashid left the house without telling anyone and attempted suicide by jumping from the bridge into the Kallayi river. But, at the time, a few people passing by saved Rashid and brought him home.

When Rashid and his family begin to leave their home, Sreedharan arrives with Fatah and Ansar Ahmed, the secretary sent by Arbab's son. Arbab's son informs Rashid through a video message that there has been some delay due to his father's death. He also says that the construction of Uru should be completed soon and that the money for it will be given shortly. Sreedharan tells Rashid that Fatah is the reason for solving all the problems and that he should end his separation with his son.

== Cast ==
- Mamukkoya as Sreedharan Aashari
- Manju Pathrose as Ayisha
- Manoj K. U. as Rashid
- Rajendran Thayatt as Achuthan
- Ajay Kallai as Ajayan, Achuthan's son and carpenter
- Albert Alex as Bhaskaran
- Arjun S. Kulathingal as Fatah
- Ubaid Muhsin as Police inspector

== Production ==
=== Development ===
Uru is produced by Mansoor Palloor, a former expat of Qatar, under the banner of Zams Production House. The first-look poster for the film was released in September 2021 by writer K. P. Ramanunni.

=== Filming ===
The shooting of the film took place in Beypore and Mahe.

== Soundtrack ==
Uru

Soundtrack album by Kamal Prashanth
- Released: 2023
- Genre: Feature film soundtrack
- Length: 7:53
- Language: Malayalam
- Label: Millennium Audios

Kamal Prashanth composed the film's music. Deepankuran Kaithapram composed the background score. Gireesh Ambra wrote, composed, and sang the folk song "Hailesa Hailesa".

Track listing
| No. | Title | Lyrics | Music | Singer(s) | Length |
|---|---|---|---|---|---|
| 1. | "Kannerkadalin Thirayil" | Prabha Varma | Kamal Prashanth | Sai Balan | 4:37 |
| 2. | "Hailesa Hailesa" (Folk song) | Gireesh Ambra | Gireesh Ambra | Gireesh Ambra | 3:16 |

== Release ==
=== Theatrical ===
The film was theatrically released in Kerala on 3 March 2023.

=== Home media ===
Highrich OTT obtained the digital rights of the film and began streaming it on 4 September 2023.

== Reception ==
=== Critical reception ===
Jithin of Manoramaonline wrote, "The film has a simple storyline. It tells about the hunger of the human mind for luxurious life, the trouble of the misunderstood new generation and the depth of family ties." Subhash K. Jha of Times Now gave 2.5 out of 5 stars and wrote "In spite of its tendency to lapse into over-sentimentality, Uru is a fine attempt to serve up a heartwarming homily on the wages of sudden insolvency."

== Accolades ==
Uru bagged three awards when the 4th Prem Nazir Film Awards were announced in 2022. The film also received four awards from the Escol Malabar Film Fest Awards held in 2023.

| Year | Award | Category | Recipient | Result | Ref. |
|---|---|---|---|---|---|
| 2022 | 4th Prem Nazir Film Awards | Special Jury Award | E.M. Ashraf | Won | |
| 2022 | 4th Prem Nazir Film Awards | Best Social Responsibility Film | Mansoor Palloor | Won | |
| 2022 | 4th Prem Nazir Film Awards | Best Lyricist | Prabha Varma | Won | |
| 2023 | Escol Malabar Film Fest Awards | Best Actress | Manju Pathrose | Won | |
| 2023 | Escol Malabar Film Fest Awards | Best Lyricist | Prabha Varma | Won | |
| 2023 | Escol Malabar Film Fest Awards | Best Background Score | Deepankuran | Won | |
| 2023 | Escol Malabar Film Fest Awards | Best Colourist | Hari G. Nair | Won | |
