= Visudha Mejo =

2022 Malayalam film

- Theatrical release poster
- Directed by: Kiran Antony
- Written by: Dinoy Poulose
- Produced by: Vinod Shornur; Jomon T John; Shameer Muhammed
- Starring: Dinoy Paulose; Mathew Thomas; Lijomol Jose; Anaswara Rajan
- Music by: Justin Varghese
- Production companies: CNC Cinemaas; Plan J Studios.
- Release date: 16 September 2022
- Country: India
- Language: Malayalam

Visudha Mejo (English: Pure Mejo) is a 2022 Indian Malayalam-language romantic drama film written and directed by Kiran Antony. The film stars Dinoy Paulose, Mathew Thomas, Lijomol Jose and Anaswara Rajan. The film was produced by Jomon T. John, Vinod Shornur, and Shameer Muhammed under the banner of CNC Cinemaas and Plan J Studios. The film's music was composed by Justin Varghese and the cinematography was handled by Jomon T. John.

== Cast ==
- Dinoy Paulose as Mejo Thomas
- Mathew Thomas as Ambrose
- Lijomol Jose as Jeena Francis
- Anaswara Rajan as Maria
- Abhiram Radhakrishnan as Paily
- Hakim Shahjahan as Rahul
- Baiju Ezhupunna as Chacko
- RJ Murukan as Thomas
- Remya Suresh
- Shainy Sara as Moly
- Siju Sunny as James

== Production ==
The film was scheduled to release on 5 August 2022 and film postponed to 16 September 2022 due to heavy rainfall.

== Reception ==
V Vinod Nair of Times of india gave 2.5 stars out of 5 and wrote that "This romance fails to appeal as it lacks a convincing script and acting." Onmanorama critic noted that "Lijo Mol proves yet again in this amateur ‘stalking’ drama". Sanjith Sidhardhan of OTTplay gave 2.5 out of 5 and wrote that "Visudha Mejo also serves as a companion piece to Pathrosinte Padappukal, in the sense that it gets off to a promising start but ends up all over the place in the latter half. The lack of chemistry between its lead characters also contribute to making this film a less engaging affair."
