= Baakki Vannavar =

2022 Malayalam film by Amal Prasi

- Directed by: Amal Prasi
- Written by: Amal Prasi, Salmanul Faris
- Produced by: Salmanul Faris
- Cinematography: Rahim Ibn Rasheed
- Edited by: Thamjeedh Thaha
- Production companies: Blue Collar Cinemas; Collective Phase One
- Release date: 2022
- Running time: 88 minutes
- Country: India
- Language: Malayalam

Baakki Vannavar (English: The Leftovers) is a 2022 Malayalam film directed by Amal Prasi and starring Salmanul in the lead role. The film was premiered at the International Film Festival of Kerala (IFFK) in Thiruvananthapuram in December 2022. The film through the main character, represents a replica of an average Malayali Man, fresh out of college without a proper job. The movie also stars Anekh Bose, Lejeesh Mani, Faeez Muhammed, Ansu Sabu, Rehas Muhammed, Anandhu Madhu, Nithin Babu, and Mirshan Khan. Baakki Vannavar was also selected for the Indian Film festival of Melbourne. The film is backed by Filmmaker Rajeev Ravi, backed by his Collective Phase One team members.

== Synopsis ==
The film presents a though provoking narrative exploring social themes and human nature. The film is a timely exploration of the social and economical degradation of Kerala's development prospects and how the youth have to sit back and wait endlessly for state-sponsored jobs. The movie follows the hero and his interaction with the like minded misfits around him, who are yet to find their voices to fight the unfair job market.

== Cast ==
- Salmanul Faris as the delivery partner
- Anekh Bose as Anekhan
- Lejeesh Mani as Leju
- Faeez Muhammed as the last customer
- Ansu Sabu as the girl in the agency
- Rehas Muhammed as the interviewer
- Anandhu Madhu as Madhu
- Mirshan Khan as the arguer
- Nithin Babu as the beat boy

== Soundtrack ==
The background score for the film is composed by Faisal Razi.

== Release and reception ==
The film had its world premiere at the International Film Festival of Kerala (IFFK) in Thiruvananthapuram in December 2022. Being one of the most well received films at the 27th edition of the IFFK, Baakki Vannavar received its independent screening in selected theaters the month of August 2023, in Kochi.
