= Siju Sunny =

Indian actor and writer

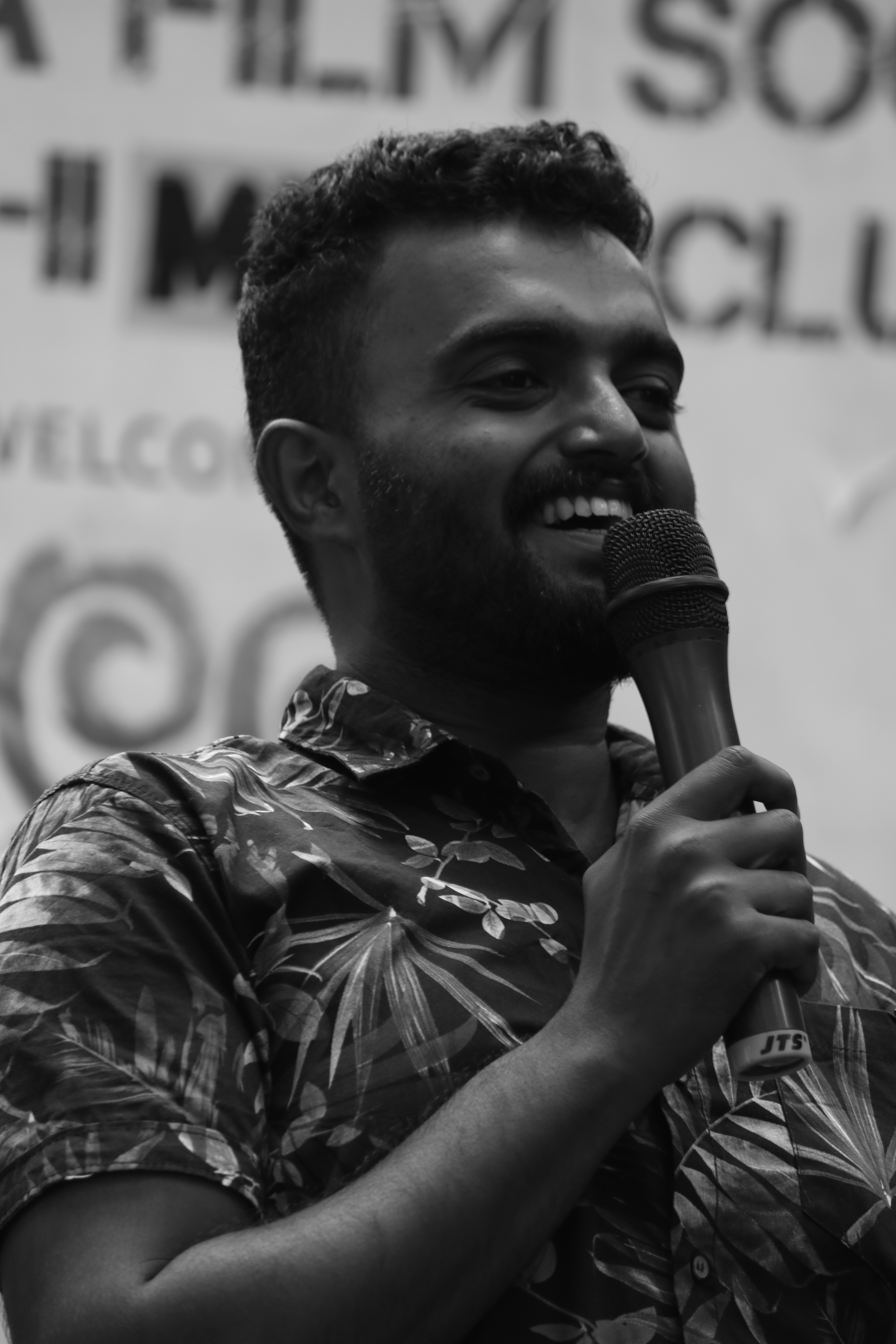
- Citizenship: Indian
- Occupations: Actor; writer
- Years active: 2023 - present

Siju Sunny is an Indian actor and writer who primarily works in the Malayalam film industry. He is best known for his roles in Guruvayoor Ambalanadayil, Romancham and Vaazha – Biopic of a Billion Boys.

== Career ==
Siju Sunny began his career during the COVID-19 lockdown by creating comedic content on Instagram Reels, which brought him online recognition. A mechanical engineer by qualification and a former Gulf expatriate, Siju was actively involved in school and college-level dramatics.

He made his film debut with a small role in Visudha Mejo (2022), followed by a brief appearance in Vellari Pattanam (2023). His breakthrough came with the horror-comedy film Romancham (2023), where he played the eccentric character Mukesh. The film was a commercial success, and Siju’s performance received widespread acclaim, earning him the SIIMA Award for Best Debutant Actor in Malayalam. Sunny also made a cameo appearance in the Parimal Shais track "Ayyayyo".

In 2024, Siju appeared in notable films such as Guruvayoor Ambalanadayil, Vaazha – Biopic of a Billion Boys, and Parakramam. In 2025, he co-wrote and starred in Maranamass, a dark comedy directed by Sivaprasad and produced by Tovino Thomas. He portrayed Aravindan, a bus conductor, and the story was based on a real-life incident that he had personally witnessed.

He is also part of the ensemble cast in the upcoming film Vysanasametham Bandhumithradhikal, produced by Vipin Das.

== Filmography ==
=== As actor ===
Year	Title	Role	Notes	Ref.
2022	Visudha Mejo	James		
2023	Vellari Pattanam	Moscow Sunny		
2023	Romancham	Mukesh	Won–SIIMA Awards for Best Debutant Actor	
2024	Guruvayoor Ambalanadayil	Shamsudheen (Shamsu)		
2024	Vaazha: Biopic of a Billion Boys	Ajo Thomas		
2024	Parakramam	Balu		
2025	Maranamass	Aravindan K alias Aruvi	Also writer	
2025	Vyasanasametham Bandhumithradhikal	Suhail Muhammad		
2026	Vaazha II: Biopic of a Billion Bros	Ajo Thomas	Cameo	

=== As Writer ===
Year	Title	Co-writers	Notes	Ref.
2021	Just Married Things	Princy Denny, Visakh Nandu, Shyam Sasidhar	Behindwoods Ice YouTube series	
2025	Maranamass	Sivaprasad	Debut film as a co-script writer	

== Accolades ==
Year	Award	Category	Film	Result	Ref.
2024	SIIMA Awards	Best Debutant Actor	Romancham	Won	
