= Aalankam =

2023 Indian Malayalam film

- Aalankam Poster
- Directed by: Shani Khader
- Written by: Shani Khader
- Produced by: Shaji Ambalath, Betty Sathish Raval
- Starring: Lukman Avran; Jaffer Idukki; Sharanya R; Gokulan M S; Sudhi Koppa
- Cinematography: Sameer Haq
- Edited by: Nishadh Yusuf
- Music by: Kiran Jose
- Production company: Ziad India Entertainments Pvt Ltd.
- Release date: 10 March 2023 (Kerala)

Aalankam is an Indian Malayalam-language film directed by Shani Khader starring Lukman Avaran, Jaffer Idukki, Sharanya R and Gokulan MS. The film was released on 10 March 2023.

== Plot ==
Aalankam, according to the film's creators, it's a mystery thriller and the actors are portraying a grey shade characters and the movie is said to be a 'Garish Macabre'.

== Cast ==
- Jaffar Idukki
- Lukman Avaran as Pookkal
- Gokulan
- Sudhi Koppa
- Mamukkoya
- Balu Varghese
- Kalabhavan Haneef
- Kabir Kadir
- Remya Suresh
- Geethi Sangeetha
- Deepak Parambol
- Sharanya R
- Sajesh Nambiar

== Production ==
The film is produced by Shaji Amabalath and Betty Sathish Raval under the banner Ziad India Entertainments Pvt Ltd.

== Development ==
The title of the film, Aalankam, was announced on 25 October 2021 by the makers of the film. The first-look poster, featuring Lukman Avaran, Jaffer Idukki and Gokulan MS was released on 25 October 2021. A suspense thriller that dwells through the life of gangsters.

== Release ==
The trailer was released on 25 December 2022 and the film released on March 10, 2023.
