= Dev Mohan =

Indian actor

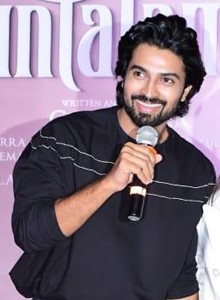
- Dev Mohan in 2023
- Born: 18 September 1992 (age 34); Thrissur, Kerala, India
- Education: Vidya Academy of Science and Technology
- Occupations: Actor; model; mechanical engineer
- Years active: 2020–present
- Spouse: Rajina

Dev Mohan is an Indian actor and model who works in Malayalam and Telugu films. After making his debut in the Malayalam film Sufiyum Sujatayum (2020), he expanded to Telugu cinema with Shaakuntalam (2023). He won Filmfare Award for Best Male Debut for the former film.

== Early and personal life ==
Dev Mohan was born on 18 September 1992 in Thrissur, Kerala. He did his schooling from Technical High School, Thrissur. After studying Mechanical Engineering from Vidya Academy of Science and Technology, Thrissur, he started his modelling career.

In 2016, he participated in the Peter England Mr. India 2016 pageant conducted in Mumbai and was a finalist in it.

In 2020 he married his long time girlfriend Rajina.

== Career ==
In 2020 Dev Mohan appeared in the title role Sufi, in the film Sufiyum Sujatayum which was released on Amazon Prime Video. He was selected for the role through an audition conducted by the crew. After the audition he went on two year preparation for the role learning Arabic and Sufi dance. It took about nine months to perfect the Sufi whirling. He was praised for his performance in the film. Lohesh Balachandran of India Today wrote that, "Credit of the film goes to both the director and the lead actors, Dev Mohan and Aditi Rao Hydari, who slip into their roles with elan." He got recognition from this film.

After that he did another Malayalam film Pulli. In 2021, he was selected to play Dushyanta in the Telugu film Shaakuntalam opposite Samantha. In 2022, he appeared in the Malayalam film Panthrandu which was his first movie to have a theatrical release. Regarding his role, a critic noted that "Dev Mohan, looks good in this action thriller, but doesn't strike the chord he did in his debut romantic role in Sufiyum Sujathayum".

== Filmography ==
=== Films ===
Year	Title	Role	Language	Notes	Ref.
2020	Sufiyum Sujatayum	Sufi	Malayalam		
2021	Home	Film star	Malayalam	Cameo appearance	
2021	Dive	Film Aspirant	Malayalam	Short film	
2022	Panthrandu	Immanuel	Malayalam		
2023	Shaakuntalam	Dushyanta	Telugu		
2023	Valatty	Anand	Malayalam	Cameo appearance	
2023	Pulli	Stephen	Malayalam		
2024	Parakramam	Vaishak Sukumaran (Vichu)	Malayalam		
2026	Sathi Leelavathi	Ram Sethu	Telugu		
2026	Ananthan Kaadu	Murali	Malayalam; Tamil	Bilingual film	
2026	Disco	Ousu	Malayalam		

== Awards and nominations ==
Year	Award	Category	Film	Result	Ref.
2022	10th South Indian International Movie Awards	Best Male Debut – Malayalam	Sufiyum Sujatayum	Won	
2022	67th Filmfare Awards South	Best Male Debut	Sufiyum Sujatayum	Won	
