= E. M. Ashraf =

Malayalam writer, film critic and journalist

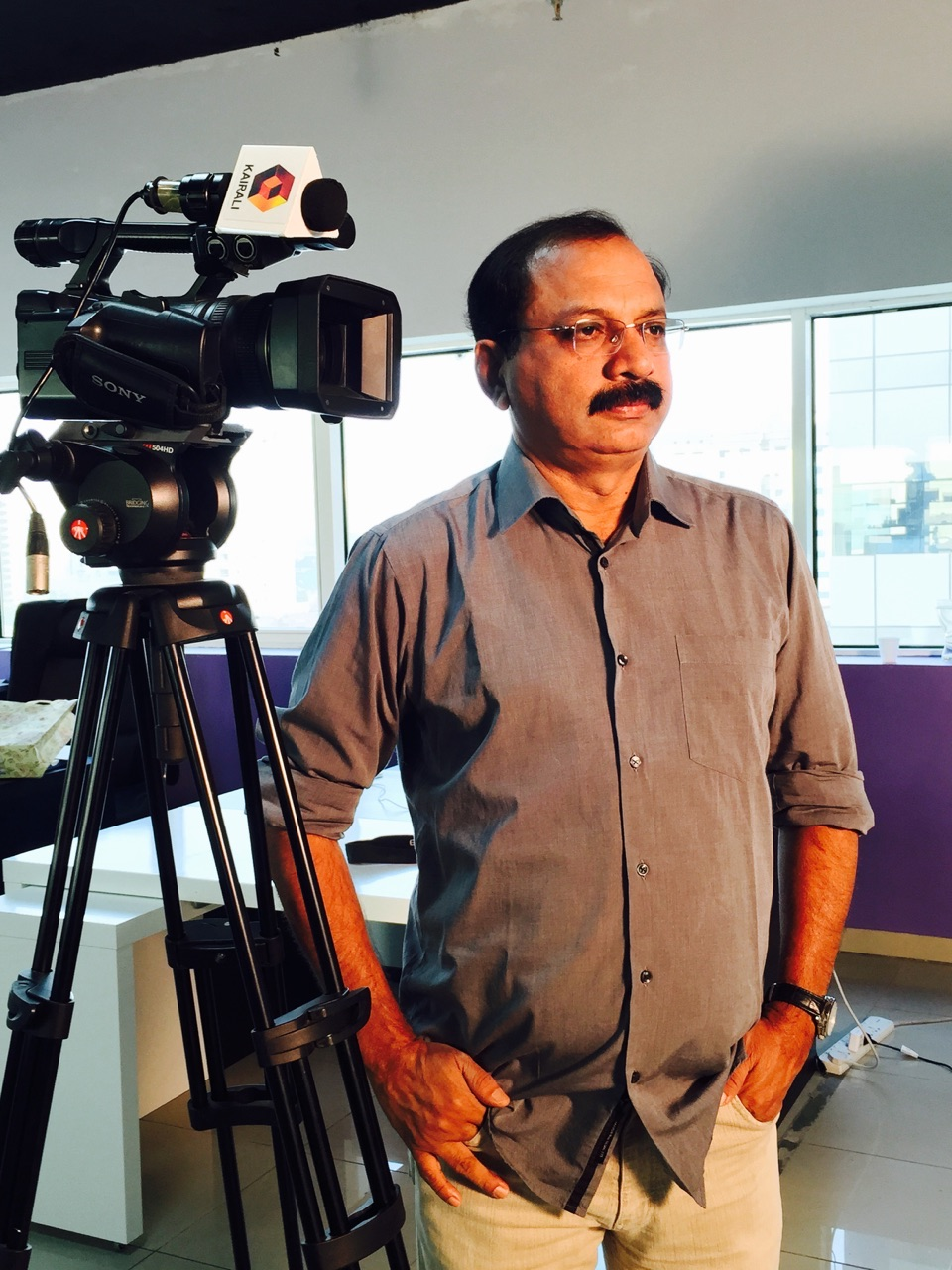
- E. M. Ashraf in Kairali Studio
- Born: Kannur, Kerala
- Occupations: Writer; journalist; film critic
- Spouse: Jabeena Ashraf
- Children: 2

E. M. Ashraf is a Malayalam writer, film critic and Journalist. He is currently the director of Middle East (News and Programmes), Kairali TV (Malayalam Communications Ltd). He has written numerous books and articles in Malayalam language, most notably the biographies of veteran Malayalam writers Vaikom Muhammad Basheer and Sukumar Azhikode. His interview with late Indian painter M. F. Husain was published in Malayalam and later translated into Arabic and English.

Currently he is settled in Dubai, UAE and appears in a weekly program in Kairali TV called 'Gulf Focus' which addresses the concerns of Malayali diaspora living in Gulf countries. He had received numerous awards for his contribution towards Malayalam literature and media.

== Early life, education and career ==
E.M. Ashraf (Edappakath Muhammed Ashraf) was born in Adikadalayi, Kannur in a Muslim family to late K. P. Moidu and E. Ayshabi. He took post graduation in literature (MA Malayalam) and master's degree in journalism (MJ). He started his career in a regional magazine called Kala Kaumudi and later worked at Kerala Kaumudi before joining Kairali TV.

During his career, he held numerous positions as President of Indian Media Forum, Kannur district president of Kerala working journalist union, Advisory committee member to Dooradarshan, Advisory committee member to Police Press relation committee to the Chief Minister of Kerala etc.

== Notable works ==
During his career he has interviewed numerous people and written many books in Malayalam. His notable works includes:

- Directed a short film called ‘Bonjour Mayyazhi' in Malayalam language acted by Malayalam writer M. Mukundan as himself.
- Vaikom Muhammad Basheer: Ezhuthum Jeevithavum (Biography of Vaikom Muhammad Basheer )
- Azheekkodinte Yathrakal (Biography of Sukumar Azhikode)
- Journey of Indian 'barefoot' master (Interview excerpts with MF Hussain)
- Ore Oru Jeevitham Swami Ananda Theertharude Jeevithavum Charithravum.
- Mayyazhi Kathakal (Compilation)
- Yamunayude Theerangalil (Travel experience with M. Mukundan)
- History of Malayalam cinema
- P.K.Adhava Punathil Kunhabdulla (A book about Malayalam writer Punathil Kunhabdulla)

== Awards and recognitions ==
He received numerous awards for his contributions to Malayalam Cinema, Journalism and other human rights activities via Gulf Focus. Some of them are:

- Kerala Press Academy ( Kerala Government award )- Best Crime report.
- Kerala Government Chalachithra academy award – Best article on Malayalam Film history
- Best film article award from Kerala Film Critics association
- Junior fellowship from Government of India Human resources department for research on Vaikkom Mohammed Basheer in English.
- UGMA award for best Pravasi journalist
- Kerala state awards for Best Telefilm and Best Director of 2015 (Bonjour Mayyazhi)
