= Vellari Pattanam =

2023 Indian Malayalam film

Vellaripattanam
- Theatrical release poster
- Directed by: Mahesh Vettiyar
- Written by: Sarath Krishna; Mahesh Vettiyar
- Produced by: Full on Studios
- Starring: Manju Warrier; Soubin Shahir; Salim Kumar; Suresh Krishna; Shabareesh Varma
- Narrated by: Biju Menon
- Cinematography: Alex J Pulickal
- Edited by: Appu N. Bhattathiri
- Music by: Sachin Sankor Mannath
- Production company: Full on Studios
- Release date: 24 March 2023
- Running time: 140 minutes
- Country: India
- Language: Malayalam

Vellari Pattanam (transl. Cucumber town) is a 2023 Indian Malayalam-language political-satire film directed by Mahesh Vettiyar and produced by Full On Studios. The film stars Soubin Shahir, Salim Kumar, Manju Warrier, and Shabareesh Varma.

== Plot ==
The story takes place in a fictional village called Chakkarakudam. Kalarykkal family, consisting of K.P Sunanda and K.P Suresh aka Leader and their father, Peethambaran, a Gandhian and a former panchayat president of UDP. Sunanda is a ward member of Panchayat and Suresh is a youth wing leader of the party.

Both are in two groups in same party. Even though there is a fight between them, they are having good bond and mocking along with the fight. Leader Suresh has an eye on Sunanda's member seat. Sunanda gained immense popularity by selling organic vegetables and doing other beneficial public services for the village and the locals. Suresh is jealous of Sunanda's influence and popularity over the ward.

Yashodha, a poor village woman, pleads Sunanda for medical help for her daughter. Then Sunanda requests about it, but president Pushkaran refuses. Suresh's crooked plans to get behind Sunandha for to gain popularity and fame fall apart due to stupidity.

Suresh remembers the past that during college days, Radhan runs to escape from the opposing party rush to attack him as he tries to tie the party flag. while running, he threw a packet with the flag, Suresh got it, he picked it up and tied it. Baburaj stops his partymen from attacking him and Radhan and saves them. But they hit Suresh's leg. His father, Sunanda and his college friends come to the hospital to see him. Sunanda knows that Alina and Suresh were in love. Knowing this, her father Alex, who doesn't like him, exiles his daughter to another place.

As a part of group fight, Alex's goons threw bombs at house. In that attack sunanda and suresh lost their mother. As a Gandhian, Peethan forgave the culprits. he became the president breaking LDP's strong hold. Then Alex again began to work against him, along with Gunapal and Pushkaran trapped in a vigilance case. Then they didn't accept suresh in place of his father, they strategically placed Sunanda who was not much interest in politics. Suresh misunderstands that She is with those who are opposed him without giving him a party seat. Harilal Choudhary, the national leader of UDP, is coming to visit Chakkarakudam and Suresh thinks that he can meet and impress him to get a seat for himself. But, by welcoming Choudhary and translates his speech, Sunanda impressed than the others.

Alex deliberately doesn't give a chance to Suresh to participate in election for the panchayath member seat. KP meets BRP workers and they invite him to the party. But, Suresh and Radhan join LDP from UDP. Baburaj and LC member send them to the party village to learn party tactics under Kunjikrishnan Mash, an ideologue of the party.

Thus, the election preparations began. Sasi asked the LC member to give a seat in the election under LDP, but the LC member refused. Then Sunanda advised and helped Sasi to contest as an independent candidate. And Suresh got a seat in LDP through Kumar's recommendation.

BRP leader Sathyasheelan and PPDP member Sulaiman plans a communal riot. His wife, Fathima informs Sunanda of this information and so their plan goes awry.

Finally, Aleena and Suresh get married. Then, the high command appointed Sunanda as a candidate for the next by-election. She cunningly move forwarded by sidelined her party enemies. In the end reveals that Keluji's drunken son broke the arm of his father's statue because he did not value family over the welfare of the people.

== Cast ==
- Soubin Shahir as K. P. Suresh
- Manju Warrier as K. P. Sunanda
- Ramesh Kottayam as Kalarykkal Peethambaran
- Salim Kumar as Kunjikannan Mash
- Suresh Krishna as Alex Vettukala aka Alexji
- Krishna Shankar as Radhan
- Shabareesh Varma as Baburaj
- Abhirami Bhargavan as Aleena
- Veena Nair as Neena Koshi
- Remya Suresh as Yashoda
- Pramod Veliyanad as Comrade Chenthamarakshan, LC Member
- Kumar as C. M. Pushkaran
- Harish Pengan as Sasi
- Maala Parvathi as Minister
- Mahesh Vettiyar as Suleiman
- Siju Sunny as Moscow Sunny
- Sreekanth Vettiyar as Sathyasheelan

=== Family Tree of Kalarykkal family ===
Kalarykkal Peethambaran	Sreedevi
K. P. Sunanda	K. P. Suresh	Aleena Alex

== Production ==
=== Filming ===
The principal photography of the movie Vellaripattanam started with a pooja which was held on 6 November 2021, at Palliyarakkavu Temple in Vettiyar near Mavelikkara. Manju Warrier lit the lamp and M. S. Arun Kumar performed the switch-on ceremony and Abhirami Bhargavan gave the first clap for the film.

Vellaripattanam is the directorial debut of Mahesh Vettiyar. He also co-wrote the screenplay with journalist Sarath Krishna. The film was produced by Sajai Sebastian and Kannan Satheesan through the production company Full On Studios. Alex J. Pulickal was the cinematographer, Appu N. Bhattathiri edited the movie. Sameera Saneesh was the costume designer and Sachin Sankor Mannath composed the soundtrack. The film was shot in the rustic beauty of Kallyathra junction Sharngakavu Temple in Venmony, Vettiyar Mavelikkara.

== Soundtrack ==
The music of the film was composed by Sachin Shankor Mannath. The soundtrack is released and distributed by Manorama Music Songs.

Song	Singer	Lyrics
"Enthu Naada"	Gana Bala, Yadhu Krishnan (Rap)	Vinayak Sasikumar
"Arikeyonnu Kandoru "	Harishankar, Nithya Mammen	Vinayak Sasikumar
"Oru Nadiyayi"	Pooja Venkataraman, Sachin Shankor Mannath,	Vinayak Sasikumar
"Ayyada Maname"	Pushpavathi	Madhu Vasudevan

== Release ==
=== Theatrical ===
The poster of the film was released on 30 April 2022 by actor Mammootty. The teaser was released on 10 June 2022. The trailer was released on 19 March 2023. The film was "U" censored. It was released in theatres on 24 March 2023.

=== Home media ===
The digital rights of the film is acquired by Amazon Prime Video and started streaming from 21 April 2023. The satellite rights of the film is acquired by Amrita TV and will premiere on the occasion of Onam 2025.

== Title ==
The film title was initially titled Vellarikka Pattanam, but Maneesh Kurup registered and secured the censor certificate with that title. The production company changed the name to Vellari Pattanam.

== Reception ==
=== Critical reception ===
The Times of India gave the film 3 stars out of 5 and stated "Manju Warrier has done a brilliant job as Sunanda and Soubin was excellent as Suresh. But he definitely didn't need that wig." S. R. Praveen of The Hindu wrote "is a stale political satire that doesn't try to do anything new, ending up as a pale imitation of some past hits". A critic from Mathrubhumi gave a mixed review.
