= Jithu Madhavan =

Indian filmmaker and screenwriter

- Occupations: Film director; Writer
- Years active: 2016–present
- Spouse: Shifina Babin Pakker

Jithu Madhavan is an Indian film director who works in Malayalam film industry. He is known for his debut horror comedy film Romancham (2023) and his action comedy film Aavesham (2024), and the Tamil dark comedy film Scene (2026). He is the writer of the films Painkili and Balan: The Boy.

== Filmography ==
Key
†	Denotes films that have not yet been released

=== As director and writer ===
Year	Title	Credited as		Language	Notes
Year	Title	Director	Writer	Language	Notes
2016	Guppy	Assistant	No	Malayalam	
2023	Romancham	Yes	Yes	Malayalam	Directorial debut
2024	Aavesham	Yes	Yes	Malayalam	
2025	Painkili	No	Yes	Malayalam	
2026	Balan: The Boy	No	Yes	Malayalam	
2026	Scene	Yes	Yes	Tamil	Debut in Tamil cinema
