= Vaazha: Biopic of a Billion Boys (soundtrack) =

2024 Malayalam-language soundtrack album

Soundtrack album by Rajat Prakash, Nomadic Voice, Parvatish Pradeep, Electronic Kili, Jay Stellar and Rakz Radiant
- Released: 15 August 2024
- Recorded: 2024
- Studios: VTP Studios, Kochi; Pop Media House, Kochi; Audiogene Sound Studios, Kochi; Deepak SR Productions, Thiruvananthapuram; MLounge Studio, Kochi; Labyrinth Studio, Thiruvananthapuram; Junglebeam Studio, Dublin
- Genre: Feature film soundtrack
- Length: 21:10
- Language: Malayalam
- Label: Think Music

Singles from Vaazha: Biopic of a Billion Boys
- 1. "Athimanoharam" Released: 19 July 2024; 2. "Vaazha Anthem" Released: 7 August 2024

Vaazha: Biopic of a Billion Boys is the soundtrack album to the 2024 Malayalam-language comedy drama film of the same name directed by Anand Menen and written and co-produced by Vipin Das. The soundtrack featured six songs composed by Rajat Prakash, Nomadic Voice, Parvatish Pradeep, Electronic Kili, Jay Stellar and Rakz Radiant with lyrics written by Vinayak Sasikumar, B. K. Harinarayanan, Prakash, Nomadic Voice and Rakz Radiant. The album was released through Think Music on 15 August 2024.

== Background ==
The soundtrack for Vaazha: Biopic of a Billion Boys featured six songs composed by Rajat Prakash, Nomadic Voice, Parvatish Pradeep, Electronic Kili, Jay Stellar and Rakz Radiant. Pradeep contributed two songs, and the latter two jointly composed and sung one song, while the remainder of them had contributed one song each. Ankit Menon served as the music supervisor, having previously associated with Anand Menen in Gauthamante Radham (2020) and Vipin Das in Antakshari, Jaya Jaya Jaya Jaya Hey (both 2022) and Guruvayoor Ambalanadayil (2024). According to Anand, the "Vaazha Anthem" and "Swaha" were composed earlier even before Das had wrote the script. Parvatish Pradeep, who composed "Makane" said that he watched the visuals before conceptualizing the song which had to depict the father-son bonding.

== Release ==
The soundtrack was preceded with the first single "Athimanoharam" which released on 19 July 2024. The second song "Vaazha Anthem" was released on 7 August. The remaining songs were released along with the soundtrack through Think Music on 15 August, the same day as the film's release.

== Track listing ==
No.	Title	Lyrics	Music	Singer(s)	Length
1.	"Athimanoharam"	Rajat Prakash	Rajat Prakash	Hatsmyth, Rajat Prakash	3:02
2.	"Vaazha Anthem"	Nomadic Voice	Nomadic Voice	Nomadic Voice	2:48
3.	"Thottavadi"	Vinayak Sasikumar	Parvatish Pradeep	Parvatish Pradeep, Pranavam Sasi	3:32
4.	"Makane"	B.K. Harinarayanan	Parvatish Pradeep	Sooraj Santhosh	4:32
5.	"Eyy Banane"	Vinayak Sasikumar	Electronic Kili	Electronic Kili	4:30
6.	"Swaha"	Rakz Radiant	Rakz Radiant, Jay Stellar	Rakz Radiant, Jay Stellar	2:46
Total length:					21:10

== Background Score ==
Vaazha: Biopic of a Billion Boys

Soundtrack album by A Team
- Released: 6 November 2024
- Recorded: 2024
- Studios: Multiple Prominent Studios, Kochi, Kerala
- Genre: Feature film score
- Length: 27:41
- Label: Think Music

No.	Title	Length
1.	"Title Theme"	1:11
2.	"Vaazha Grows"	1:17
3.	"Junior Horlicks"	1:24
4.	"Daisy Oh Baby"	1:56
5.	"Bro Connection 101"	0:23
6.	"Malgova"	1:55
7.	"Daisy Trapped Vishwam Snapped"	2:20
8.	"Boys Separation"	1:24
9.	"Exam Failed Game Over"	1:22
10.	"No Change"	1:14
11.	"College Fight"	1:14
12.	"Moosa's Dad"	0:50
13.	"Maya Bike Ride"	1:16
14.	"Ajo Vs Maya"	1:21
15.	"Three Mistakes Of My Life"	0:36
16.	"Hashirey"	0:51
17.	"Rockets In Station"	1:02
18.	"Left Alone At Police Station"	0:50
19.	"Search Of Vishnu"	0:48
20.	"Convince Vishnu"	0:56
21.	"Boys Reunited"	1:12
22.	"Run Up The Stairs"	0:24
23.	"Hospital"	0:39
24.	"Fathers And The Sons"	1:14
Total length:		27:41

== Reception ==
Ajay U. K. of The News Minute said, "The music, which Vaazha is heavily reliant on, shows the delicateness of male vulnerability." Vignesh Madhu of The New Indian Express considered the music to be "overpowering". Gayathri Krishna of OTTPlay wrote "Vaazha's entertaining factor is further amplified by the music, making it more appealing to younger audiences." Anandu Suresh of The Indian Express complimented the music of the film, which aids among the other technical aspects.

== Controversy ==
Renowned film music critic T. P. Sasthamangalam was critical of the lyrics in the song "Eyy Banane" as he found it nonsensical and an insult to legendary lyricists such as P. Bhaskaran. He also criticised the song "Vaazha Anthem" as he found the lyrics to be "distorted".

== Use in sequel ==
Composer Parvatish Pradeep had created a mashup of "Makane" with the song "Koodappirannor" from the sequel Vaazha II: Biopic of a Billion Bros (2026).

== Personnel ==
Credits adapted from Think Music India:

- Music composers: Rajat Prakash, Nomadic Voice, Parvatish Pradeep, Electronic Kili, Jay Stellar, Rakz Radiant
- Music producers: Rajat Prakash, Arcado, Enxofreeze, Uppan, Parvatish Pradeep, Electronic Kili, Jay Stellar
- Music supervisor: Ankit Menon
- Session engineer: Abhiraman
- Music coordinator: KD Vincent
- Studios: VTP Studios, Kochi; Pop Media House, Kochi; Audiogene Sound Studios, Kochi; Deepak SR Productions, Trivandrum; Labyrinth Studios, Trivandrum; Junglebeam Studio, Dublin
- Studio managers: Febin George, Sanjay CK (VTP Studios)
- Recording engineers: Vivek Thomas, Sibin Wilson, Jisto George, Adwin, Amal Raj, Shyam, Deepak SR, Akshay Raj, Simba
- Mixing: Vivek Thomas, Sibin Wilson, Arcado, Abin Paul, Ashbin Paulson
- Mastering: Vivek Thomas, Sibin Wilson, Shatarchi Hundet, Abin Paul, Jay Stellar
- Chorus: Ayaan Nishad, Ankit Menon, Anand Menon, Abhiraman, Sharan Rajamohanan, Rajat Prakash, Aditya Arjun, Kili, Parvatish Pradeep, Arcado, Amrita Jayakumar, Jay Stellar, Arora
- Flute: Shyam Adat, Amaljeeth
- Guitar: Tjus, Cee Vee, Sandeep Mohan
- Bass: Cee Vee, Sandeep Mohan
- Percussions, tabla and thavil: Sandeep PN
- Nadaswaram: OK Gopi
- One-man string quartet: Sravan Krishnakumar
