= Nithish Sahadev =

Indian film director (born 1991)

- Born: Nithish Sahadev; 1 March 1991 (age 35); Thiruvananthapuram, Kerala
- Education: Mohandas College of Engineering & Technology, Thiruvananthapuram
- Occupation: Film director
- Years active: 2016 - present
- Notable work: Falimy

Nithish Sahadev (born 1 March 1991) is an Indian film director who primarily works in the Malayalam film industry. He is well known for his directorial debut Falimy (2023).

== Early life ==
He was born in Thiruvananthapuram, Kerala. He pursued a degree in Electronics and Communication Engineering at Mohandas College of Engineering and Technology, Nedumangad, Thiruvananthapuram. Later, he attended Chennai Film Industrial School.

== Career ==
He started his career in the film industry as an assistant director. His debut as an assistant director was in Mudhugauv (2016), the directorial debut of Vipin Das, who is known for films such as Antakshari and Jaya Jaya Jaya Jaya Hey. He also worked with director Jude Anthany Joseph, serving as an assistant director on Oru Muthassi Gadha (2016). In 2019, Sahadev directed the short film Magneto starring Anand Menen. In 2020, he worked as the creative director for the film Antakshari, starring Saiju Kurup and Priyanka Nair. The following year, he produced the short web series Kalyana Kacheri.

In 2023, Sahadev made his directorial debut with the Malayalam-language comedy-drama Falimy. The film, starring Basil Joseph, Jagadish, and Manju Pillai, follows the journey of a dysfunctional middle-class family on a trip to Varanasi, exploring the personal growth and realizations they experience along the way. Following the success of Falimy, Sahadev announced his upcoming directorial project, which will star the renowned Malayalam actor Mammootty. For his Tamil debut, Nithish Sahadev directed the political film, Thalaivar Thambi Thalaimaiyil (2026) where Jiiva is introduced as the panchayat president.

== Filmography ==
=== As director ===
Year	Title	Language	Notes
2019	Magneto	Malayalam	Short film
2023	Falimy	Malayalam	
2026	Thalaivar Thambi Thalaimaiyil	Tamil	

=== Other roles ===
Year	Title	Role	Notes
2016	Mudhugauv	Assistant Director	
2016	Oru Muthassi Gadha	Assistant Director	
2020	Antakshari	Creative Director	
2020	Kalyana Kacheri	Creative Director	TV series
