= Guruvayoor Ambalanadayil (soundtrack) =

Soundtrack album by Ankit Menon
- Released: 30 May 2024
- Recorded: 2023–2024
- Studios: Voice & Vision Studios, Chennai; Pop Media House, Kochi; SKR Studios, Kochi; Space Cat Studio, Mumbai; M Lounge, Kochi; Audiogene Studios, Kochi; K7 Studios, Kochi; 20db Studios, Chennai; GTR Studios, Dubai
- Genre: Feature film soundtrack
- Length: 15:51
- Languages: Malayalam; Tamil
- Label: Saregama
- Producers: Ankit Menon; Arcado; Sreerag Suresh; Abin Thomas; Parvatish Pradeep; Electronic Kili

Ankit Menon chronology
Voice of Sathyanathan (2023)	Guruvayoor Ambalanadayil (2024)	Nadanna Sambhavam (2024)

Singles from Guruvayoor Ambalanadayil
- 1. "K for Krishna" Released: 5 May 2024; 2. "K For Kalyanam" Released: 14 May 2024; 3. "K for Krishna 1.5x" Released: 23 May 2024; 4. "K For Kabaradakkam" Released: 25 May 2024

Guruvayoor Ambalanadayil is the soundtrack album to the 2024 Malayalam-language comedy film of the same name directed by Vipin Das and produced by Prithviraj Productions and E4 Entertainment, starring Prithviraj Sukumaran, Basil Joseph, Nikhila Vimal and Anaswara Rajan. The music was composed by Ankit Menon featuring five songs with lyrics written by Vinayak Sasikumar, Suhail Koya, Asal Kolaar and Dabzee. All the songs were released as singles prior to the album on 30 May 2024.

== Development ==
The soundtrack and background score to the film is composed by Ankit Menon who had previously associated with Vipin on Antakshari and Jaya Jaya Jaya Jaya Hey (both 2022). Vinayak Sasikumar wrote the lyrics for three of the songs, while Suhail Koya wrote one song and rap versions written by Asal Kolaar and Dabzee, the latter of whom served as the co-composer. Most of the songs were composed after the film was shot so that it would align with the visuals and the actor's performances.

The song "K for Krishna" was not planned in the script and was an experimental track. But with his and Das' perusal, the song was included after they planned for a commentary-style song in the marriage sequence. Actor Aju Varghese made his playback singing debut on the track "K for Krishna". Varghese noted that Das had approached him to act as a singer in that song sequence, but his decision for playback singing came because of having liked the tune and lyrics. Sasikumar noted that in the song, the character is a common, struggling man yearning for the prayers of Lord Krishna and this reflects on his desperation.

Menon ensured the score and songs should be seamless, resulting in him supervising the soundscape. The climax piece fused Western classical and Carnatic music while also featuring a string quartet to ensure the narrative being soulful. All the songs in the film start with the title "K". The song "Azhagiya Laila" sung by Mano from the film Ullathai Allitha (1996) and a small portion of "Kannaam Thumpee" sung by K. S. Chithra from the film Kakkothikkavile Appooppan Thaadikal (1988) was reused in the film.

== Release ==
The album was preceded by the first single "K for Krishna" which released on 5 May 2024. The second single "K For Kalyanam" was released on 14 May 2024. The third single "K for Krishna 1.5x" was released on 23 May 2024. The fourth single "K For Kabaradakkam" was released on 25 May 2024 after the film's release. The last single "K For Kurukku" was released on 30 May 2024, along with the album.

== Reception ==
Gopika Is of The Times of India wrote "Ankit Menon's music boosts the energy of the film up, adding to the drama." Anandu Suresh of The Indian Express wrote "Ankit Menon deserves immense praise for his work in the music department, particularly for his skilful crafting of the BGM." Latha Srinivasan of Hindustan Times noted that "[Ankit] has combined some new age beats along with traditional music, like the wedding song". Times Now wrote "Ankit Menon's music adds to the tone without being intrusive, and we would love to see more of his work as we go forward". However, Janani K of India Today wrote "The two songs, composed by Ankit Menon, act as a speed breaker in an already crisp movie." Vignesh Madhu of Cinema Express wrote "Ankit Menon's background score is needlessly present throughout the film and yet not productive."

== Track listing ==
No.	Title	Lyrics	Music	Singer(s)	Length
1.	"K For Krishna"	Vinayak Sasikumar	Ankit Menon	Aju Varghese	3:03
2.	"K For Kalyanam"	Suhail Koya	Ankit Menon	Ankit Menon, Milan Joy, Himna Hilary, Aruna Mary George, Indu Deepu, Sharath, Aravind Nair, Neelima P. Aryan, Parvatish Pradeep	3:46
3.	"K For Krishna 1.5x"	Vinayak Sasikumar	Ankit Menon	Milan Joy, Aravind Nair, Amal C Ajith, Unni Elayaraja	3:05
4.	"K For Kabaradakkam"	Asal Kolaar, Vinayak Sasikumar	Ankit Menon	Asal Kolaar	2:25
5.	"K For Kurukku"	Dabzee, Vinayak Sasikumar	Ankit Menon, Dabzee	Dabzee, Rish NK	3:30
Total length:					15:51

== Personnel ==
Credits adapted from Saregama:

- Music composer and arranger: Ankit Menon
- Music production: Ankit Menon, Arcado, Sreerag Suresh, Abin Thomas, Parvatish Pradeep, Electronic Kili
- Chorus: Milan Joy, Aravind Nair, Amal C Ajith, Unni Elayaraja, Ashwin Aryan, Sony Mohan, Avani Malhar, Gayathri Rajiv
- Guitars: Ashwin Aryan
- Bass guitar: Sumesh Parameshwar
- Mandolin and charango: Amar Sangam
- Shehnai: Gopi
- Flute: Subin Jerson
- Percussions: Jagan Mohan, Jayaprakash, Lakshmi Kanth, Saikiran, Shruti Raj
- French horn: Francis George
- Trombone: Shibu Thomas
- Trumpet: Joshy Thomas
- Ganjira: Suresh Krishnan
- Mridangam: Balu
- Studios: Voice & Vision Studios (Chennai), Pop Media House (Kochi), SKR Studios (Kochi), Space Cat Studio (Mumbai), M Lounge (Kochi), Audiogene Studios (Kochi), K7 Studios (Kochi), 20db Studios (Chennai), Mix Magic Studios (Chennai), GTR Studios (Dubai)
- Recording: Lijesh, Nikhil Mathew, Sreerag Suresh, Tamzid Rahman, Amal Mithu, Amalraj, Jisto George, Ashwin, Shiju
- Mixing and mastering: Balu Thankachan, Rupendar Venkatesh, Shatarchi Hundet
- Music coordinators: KD Vincent, R Babu
- Music assistant: Sachin Sivadas
