= Vaazha =

Vaazha (lit. 'Banana' in Indian languages) may refer to:

== Films ==
- Vaazha: Biopic of a Billion Boys, a 2024 Indian Malayalam-language film by Anand Menen
- Vaazha II: Biopic of a Billion Bros, a 2026 Indian Malayalam-language film by Savin S A
- Vaazhai, a 2024 Indian Tamil-language children's drama film by Mari Selvaraj

== See also ==
- Vaazha Ninaithaal Vaazhalaam, a 1978 Indian Tamil-language film romantic drama film by Devaraj–Mohan
- Vaazha Vaitha Deivam, a 1959 Indian Tamil-language romantic drama film by M. A. Thirumugam
- Vaazhl, 2021 Indian Tamil-language drama film by Arun Prabu Purushothaman
- Vaazhthugal, 2008 Indian Tamil-language romantic drama film by Seeman
- Vazhve Mayam, a 1970 Indian Malayalam-language film directed by K. S. Sethumadhavan
- Vaazhvey Maayam, a 1982 Indian Tamil-language romantic drama film directed by R. Krishnamoorthy
- Vaazhkai (1949 film), a 1949 Indian Tamil-language social guidance film by A. V. Meiyappan
