= Vinayak Sasikumar =

Indian lyricist (born 1994)

- Born: 13 June 1994 (age 32); Thiruvananthapuram, Kerala, India
- Occupation: Lyricist
- Years active: 2011–present

Vinayak Sasikumar (born 13 June 1994) is an Indian lyricist, who works in Malayalam cinema.

== Personal life ==
He was born in Thiruvananthapuram, Kerala to S. Sasikumar and Asha Sasikumar. At the age of 12, he started writing poetry. Later, he moved to Chennai and completed his graduation in Economics from Loyola College, Chennai. He completed his post-graduation from Madras School of Economics. After a span wherein he worked for Ford Motors as a data scientist, he moved to Kochi as a full-time lyricist.

== Career ==
He made his debut as a lyricist in the movie Kutteem Kolum directed by Guinness Pakru. Later in the year 2013, he wrote songs for the movie Neelakasham Pachakadal Chuvanna Bhoomi directed by Sameer Thahir. The songs composed by Rex Vijayan, went on to become top hits. In 2013, he worked for the movie North 24 Kaatham, directed by Anil Radhakrishnan Menon. In 2014, he wrote songs for the movie 7th Day, directed by Syamdhar. His next movie was Sapthamashree Thaskaraha. Vinayak wrote the themes of central characters in the Amal Neerad film Iyobinte Pusthakam later in 2014. However, his big break came in 2016 with the films Guppy and Karinkunnam 6's. The songs of Guppy were critically acclaimed and went on to become top hits. His major 2017 releases include Ezra(1 Song:irulu neelum), Godha, The Great Father, Parava, Pullikkaran Staraa and Mayaanadhi(2 Songs: Kaattil and Uyirin Nadiye).

He later had a breakout year in 2019 with the hits "Aaradhike", "Njan Jackson Allada" from the Soubin Shahir starrer Ambili, "Pavizha Mazha" from the Fahadh Faasil starrer Athiran and "Minni Minni" from the film June. He was also a part of critically acclaimed films like Kumbalangi Nights, Helen and Kettiyolaanu Ente Malagha. The same year, he wrote and directed a musical short 'Hi Hello Kaadhal' starring Sarjano Khalid and Gouri Kishan, in which he penned a Tamil language song titled "Vellai Poove" that became a hit. In 2020 & 2021, he wrote songs for notable films like Drishyam 2, Nayattu, Kappela, Thinkalazhcha Nishchayam, Trance etc.

In the Mammootty-starrer film Bheeshma Parvam, he wrote the acclaimed "Parudeesa" and "Rathipushpam" that were sensational hits overnight. Later that year, he turned an English lyricist for the Jeethu Joseph film 12th Man. Vinayak was also the lyricist of A.R. Rahman's comeback Malayalam film - the Fahadh Faasil starrer survival drama Malayankunju. The subsequent months gave him more success with the songs of Jaya Jaya Jaya Jaya Hey and Romancham going viral. "Santhe Soumye" from Jaya Jaya Jaya Jaya Hey and "Aadharanjali" from Romancham became social media trendsetters.

In 2024, he penned 8 tracks for the blockbuster film Aavesham starring Fahadh Faasil. Most of the tracks, went viral across South India and even made into select official global viral charts. Illuminati - one of the tracks from the film became an instant sensation and was widely appreciated for the lyrics. He also continued the success stories for the other hit films of the year like Manjummel Boys, Guruvayoorambala Nadayil and Turbo.

== Discography ==
List of Songs

Year	Title	Notes
2013	Kutteem Kolum	1 Song (Karalil Ozhukum) Debut Movie
2013	Neelakasham Pachakadal Chuvanna Bhoomi	3 Songs (Doore Doore, Thaazhvaram, Neerpalunkukal)
2013	North 24 Kaatham	1 Song: Thaarangal Ee Yathrayil
2014	7th Day	2 Songs (Oru Kadha, Ithu Jeevitham)
2014	Sapthamashree Thaskaraha	2 Songs: Kayyethum Doorathunde and Sapthamashree Thaskaraha
2014	Iyobinte Pusthakam	Lyrics to Character Theme Music only
2015	Haram	2 Songs (Ningalkkee Lokam, Theeyaay)
2015	Lord Livingstone 7000 Kandi	2 Songs (Aayiram Naalamay, Kanmunakalil)
2016	Maalgudi Days	1 Song
2016	Aakashvani	1 Song (Mayum Sandhye)
2016	Karinkunnam 6'S	All Songs
2016	Guppy	4 Songs (Thaniye, Gabrielinte, Virinja Poonkurunne, Thira Thira)
2017	Ezra	1 Song: Irulu Neelum Raave
2017	Godha	1 Song: Oh Rabba
2017	The Great Father	1 Song: Minnum Thaarangal
2017	Himalayathile Kashmalan	1 Song: Akkidi
2017	E	All Songs
2017	Pullikkaran Staraa	1 Song: Maathalathen
2017	Parava	All Songs
2017	Mayaanadhi	2 Songs: Uyirin Nadhiye and Kaattil
2018	Rosapoo	1 Song: Muttappaattu
2018	Hey Jude	1 Song: Hey Don't Worry Jude
2018	Kuttanadan Marpappa	3 Songs
2018	B Tech	1 Song: Peda glass
2018	Orange Valley	1 Song
2018	Maradona	4 Songs (Nilapakshikal, Kathale, Varum Varum, Nilapakshikal Sad)
2018	Kidu	1 Song (Imayil)
2018	Nonsense	2 Songs (Pularnila, Chirakukal Njan Tharam)
2018	Jallianwala Bagh	1 Song (Thaa naa naa)
2018	Varathan	All Songs
2018	Mandhaaram	3 Songs (Kadalazham, Nooru Vattam, Pulari Mazhakal)
2019	Kumbalangi Nights	1 Song: Ezhutha Katha
2019	June	5 Songs: Minni Minni, Aadyam Thammil, Maane, Then Kiliye and Koodu Vittu
2019	Athiran	2 Songs: Pavizha Mazhaye and Aattuthottil
2019	Pathinettam Padi	2 Songs: Beemapalli, Kattalakal
2019	The Gambler	All Songs
2019	Luca	1 Song: Kaattum
2019	Saaho (Dubbed Film)	All Songs
2019	Ambili	All Songs
2019	Helen	2 Songs: Pon Thaarame and Kaanaatheeram
2019	Kettyolaanu Ente Malakha	1 Song: Pathivo Maarum
2019	Sullu	Song: Maariville
2019	Happy Sardar	1 Song: Meri Mary Dilruba / Hey Hello
2019	Arike Vaa (Karikku)	
2020	Gauthamante Radham	4 Songs (Uyire Kavarum, Theerakadha, Bang Bang, Moham)
2020	Trance	All Songs
2020	Mariyam Vannu Vilakkoothi	Promo Song
2020	Kappela	1 Song: Dooram Theerum Neram
2020	Kozhipporu	All Songs
2020	Kilometers and Kilometers	3 Songs (Paarake, Thane Mounam, You and Me)
2021	Saajan Bakery Since 1962	3 Songs (Once Upon a Time in Ranni, Eeran Kannil, Kaalamere)
2021	Drishyam 2	Song: Ore Pakal
2021	Nayattu	1 Song: Marukara Thedum
2021	Chiri	2 Songs: Madhura Pathinezhukari, Naanam Thookum Pennu
2021	Kala	Title Song: Vanyam
2021	Thirike	1 Song: Ormakkalame
2021	Kho-Kho	5 Songs
2021	Kaanekkaane	Song: Palnilavin Poykayil
2021	Thinkalazhcha Nishchayam	1 Song: Keda Naalame
2021	Sumesh and Ramesh	All Songs
2021	Djibouti	4 Songs (Hey Vaaname, Ore Manam, Ellam Nerayo, Neeyo Njano)
2022	Madhuram	All Songs
2022	Meppadiyan	1 Song: Ayyappa Song
2022	Bro Daddy	2 Songs: Kaana Kuyile and Theme of Bro Daddy
2022	Veyil	2 Songs: The Hey Song, Maname
2022	Bheeshma Parvam	2 Songs : Parudeesa, Rathipushpam
2022	21 Grams	1 Song: Vijanamaam Thazhvaram
2022	John Luther	All Songs
2022	Patham Valavu	1 Song: Elamalakadinullil
2022	12th Man	2 Songs: Find, Freebird
2022	Keedam	2 Songs: Kattu Thee, Subah
2022	Vaashi	All Songs
2022	Priyan Ottathilanu	1 Song: Neram Poi
2022	Pyali	1 Song: Pyali
2022	Malayankunju	All Songs
2022	Solamante Theneechakal	3 Songs: Aanandamo, Viral Thodathe, Vaanam Para Para
2022	Bermuda	2 Songs: Chodyachinnam Pole, Nee Orindrajalame
2022	Peace	1 Song: Nagaram Nagarame
2022	Mike	1 Song: Move Your Body
2022	Simon Daniel	1 Song: Ithale Ithale
2022	Ottu	All Songs
2022	Ini Utharam	All Songs
2022	My Name is Azhagan	2 Songs
2022	Appan	1 Song: Keda Kanalukal
2022	Jaya Jaya Jaya Jaya Hey	3 Songs: Jaya Jaya, Ingaatt Nokkanda, Penne Penne
2022	Sita Ramam (Malayalam)	3 Songs: Aaromal, Ariyum Thorum, Thirike Vaa
2022	Chathuram	All Songs
2022	Kooman	All Songs
2022	The Teacher	1 Song: Oruval
2022	Roy	All Songs
2022	Kaapa	1 Song: Yaamam Veendum Vinnile
2022	Oh Meri Laila	2 Songs: Raaman Thedum, Paathira Manjum
2023	Romancham	5 Songs: Aadharanjali, Athmave Po, Thalatherichavar, Manuja, Ottamuri
2023	Enkilum Chandrike	All Songs
2023	Christy	3 Songs: Paalmanam, Poovar, Maali Pattu
2023	Pranaya Vilasam	1 Song: Naruchiriyude Minnayam
2023	Ntikkakkakkoru Premandaarnn	All Songs
2023	Oh My Darling	2 Songs: Nayanthara, Vidhooramam
2023	Vellari Pattanam	3 Songs: Enthu Naada, Oru Nadhiyaay, Arike Onnu
2023	Kaipola	1 Song: Ariya Shalabhame
2023	Pookkalam	3 Songs
2023	Uschool	1 Song: Orey Mugham
2023	Valatty	1 Song: Shwanare
2023	Kunjamminis Hospital	1 Song: Ormakalee
2023	Tholvi F.C.	1 Song: Hey Nin Punchiri
2023	Kasargold	1 Song: I'm a Gold
2023	Theeppori Benny	All Songs
2023	Vaathil	1 Song: Kanive
2023	Kannur Squad	All Songs
2023	Imbam	All Songs
2023	Rani Chithra Marthanda	3 Songs: Aarum Kaana, Maariville, Ekantha Life
2023	Bandra	2 Songs: Rakka Rakka, Praanan Pol
2023	Vela	1 Song: Usha Kiraname
2023	Falimy	1 Song: Hey Bhagwan
2023	Phoenix	All Songs
2023	Rajni	1 Song: Kannuneer Thullikal
2023	Far	All Songs
2023	Neru	Only Song: Roohe
2024	Jerry	1 Song: Nee Pinangalle
2024	Thundu	All Songs
2024	Manjummel Boys	1 song: Thaai Manam
2024	Aavesham	All Songs
2024	Pavi Caretaker	1 Song: Vennila Kanyake
2024	Nadikar	2 Songs: Omal Kanave, Love Jawan
2024	Marivillin Gopurangal	4 Songs: Pokathe, Manam Manam, Mouna Sundari, Roro & Joy
2024	Guruvayoor Ambalanadayil	3 Songs: K for Krishna, K for Kurukku, K for Kabaradakkam
2024	Turbo	1 Song: Maayika Maname
2024	Little Hearts	3 Songs: Eden Poove, Oru Saayahnam, Karthave
2024	Golam	All Songs
2024	Level Cross	All Songs
2024	Checkmate	1 Song
2024	Adios Amigo	All Songs
2024	Nunakkuzhi	All Songs
2024	Vaazha - Biopic of a Billion Boys	2 Songs: Thottaavadi, Eyy Banane (jointly penned with Electronic Kili)
2024	Kondal	2 Songs: Choolamadikkeda, Aaredi Nee
2024	Bad Boyz	1 Song
2024	Kadha Innuvare	1 Song: Eravithilai
2024	Bougainvillea	1 Song: Sthuthi
2024	Pani	1 Song: Chillukale
2024	Oshana	1 Song: Azhakerum Kathal Poove
2024	Mura	1 Song: Noolilla Karakkam
2024	Sookshmadarsini	1 Song: Priyalokame
2024	Turkish Tharkam	3 Songs: Ullamarinjavale, Yatra, Erivenal
2024	Sthanarthi Sreekuttan	1 Song: Kansoochi Thumbal
2024	Rifle Club	2 Songs: "Gandharva Ganam" , "Nayattu Prarthana"
2024	Marco	4 Songs: Blood, Asuran, Marpapa, Brother
2024	Lucky Baskhar (D)	1 Song: "Lucky Baskhar Title Track"
2024	ED	1 Song: Narabhoji
2024	Barroz	1 Song: Isabella
2025	Ennu Swantham Punyalan	4 Songs: Kannadi Poove, Nasrani Penkutty, Kinavin Vari, Kaalame
2025	Pravinkoodu Shaapu	1 Song: Cheth Song
2025	Dominic and the Ladies' Purse	All Songs
2025	Painkili	All Songs
2025	Officer on Duty	1 Song: Vinnathiru Sakshi
2025	Get-Set Baby	4 Songs: Manam Peyyum, Athishayam, Rocket Science, Get Set Baby
2025	L2: Empuraan	2 Songs: Empuraane, Sancharame
2025	Maranamass	All Songs
2025	The Cake Story	2 Songs
2025	Padakkuthira	2 Songs
2025	Thudarum	1 Song: Kondattam
2025	Padakkalam	1 Song: Chathuranga Poru
2025	Lokah Chapter 1: Chandra	1 Song: Shoka Mookam
2025	Bha Bha Ba	1 Song: Azhinjattam
2025	Vrusshabha	2 Songs: Appa, Om Namah Shivaya
2025	Sarvam Maya	1 Song: Sarvam Maya Teaser Theme
2026	Patriot	2 songs: Innalekal, Manushyan
2026	Kattalan	1 song: 'Majako Mallika' composed by B Ajaneesh Loknath
2026	Bachelor Party D'eux	

== Awards and recognitions ==
1. Best Lyricist 2019 - Mazhavil Music Awards
2. Best Malayalam Lyricist 2018 - SIIMA (South Indian International Movie Awards)
3. Best Malayalam Lyricist 2019 - SIIMA (South Indian International Movie Awards)
4. Best Lyricist of the Year 2019 - Asianet Film Awards
5. Best Lyricist 2021 - Mazhavil Music Awards
6. Best Lyricist 2022 - 46th Kerala Film Critics Award 2023
7. Best Malayalam Lyricist 2023 - SIIMA (South Indian International Movie Awards)
8. Best Lyricist 2024 - Mazhavil Music Awards
