= Thalaivar Thambi Thalaimaiyil =

Indian Tamil-language political satire film

- Theatrical release poster
- Directed by: Nithish Sahadev
- Written by: Sanjo Joseph; Nithish Sahadev; Anuraj O. B.
- Produced by: Kannan Ravi
- Starring: Jiiva; Thambi Ramaiah; Ilavarasu; Prathana Nathan
- Cinematography: Bablu Aju
- Edited by: Arjune Babu
- Music by: Vishnu Vijay
- Production company: Kannan Ravi Productions
- Release date: 15 January 2026
- Running time: 115 minutes
- Country: India
- Language: Tamil
- Budget: ₹10 crore
- Box office: ₹40 crore

Thalaivar Thambi Thalaimaiyil (stylised as TTT; transl. Under the leadership of our brotherly leader) is a 2026 Indian Tamil-language political satire film directed by Nithish Sahadev and co-written by him along with Sanjo Joseph and Anuraj O. B. The film stars Jiiva alongside Thambi Ramaiah, Ilavarasu and Prathana Nathan. In the film, a village council president must maintain order after an unexpected death occurs on the eve of a wedding.

The film was announced in May 2025 under the tentative title Jiiva45. Principal photography began the same month and wrapped that July, with the official title announced only in October. The film was released in theatres on 15 January 2026 and was a critical and commercial success.

== Plot ==
Jeevarathnam is a president in the village panchayat and is respected by all the villagers. He is entrusted with ensuring that the wedding festivities of Sowmya, the daughter of Ilavarasu, proceed smoothly. Everything goes according to plan until Chellappan, the father of Ilavarasu's neighbour, Mani, dies at the neighbouring house. Mani demands Jeeva to ensure that Chellappan's funeral takes place at 10:30 am in front of his house on the next day, clashing with Sowmya's wedding which is going to take place at Ilavarasu's house. Jeeva tries to talk to Ilavarasu and Mani separately to convince one of them to agree on a different time for the intended ritual. However, both are unwilling to compromise, mainly because of the hatred that exists between them.

As elections are approaching, Jeeva's rival, Thavidu sides with Mani and even sets up a billboard about Chellappan's funeral that is bigger than the billboard for Sowmya's wedding. Unable to find a solution, Jeeva talks to Ilavarasu and Mani's wives who are on good terms with each other and succeeds in convincing Mani to conduct the funeral at 12:30 pm.

Suddenly, Chellappan's spirit apparently possesses Mani, demanding his funeral to be held at 10:30 am no matter what. Thavidu even calls Chellappan's younger brother, Nanji, a former rowdy, to Mani's house. Ilavarasu and Mani start bickering, and Ilavarasu mocks Mani's late daughter Poorni, who Mani intends to bury Chellappan's body along with. Sowmya, deeply infuriated, intervenes and ends the bicker.

Jeeva decides to divide the houses so that both rituals can take place at 10:30 am. It is revealed that Ilavarasu once saw Poorni with a guy, and created a ruckus at Mani's house, causing the word to spread. It became the word of gossip, until some even said she was pregnant within a week. Deeply embarrassed, Poorni drowned herself in the water tank, fuelling hatred between Mani and Ilavarasu. Kanniyappan "Kannis", Sowmya's fiancé, calls her shortly after to romance, but she yells at him as she is annoyed. Her one sided lover then comes and asks her to elope with him, enraging Sowmya even more, causing her to chase him with an aruval into the jungle.

A drunken Murali sees them and misunderstands that they are eloping and informs Jeeva. Thavidu informs Kannis and brings his male family members to search for Sowmya along with the other villagers. Jeeva spots the lover and questions him, and it is shown that Sowmya fell into a garbage pit while chasing him. Kannis finds Sowmya due to his dog and they reconcile.

As they are getting rescued from the pit, Ilavarasu, suspecting that Mani kidnapped Sowmya to embarrass him, brings a gun to his house. Jeeva and Sowmya rush to Mani's house but Sowmya's voice startles Ilavarasu, causing him to pull the trigger. The bullet deflects onto Chellappan's body, causing him to groan and die. It is then understood that Chellappan never died, but it was all a plan from Mani's side to sabotage Sowmya's wedding.

A fight breaks out, with Nanji's men throwing bombs, while Thavidu alerts the police and flees. At the water tank, the bag of bombs drops to the ground, causing an explosion which causes the water tank to fall and flood the two houses. Jeeva then insults Ilavarasu and Mani, then tells Sowmya to get married and leave as soon as possible. Kannis brings Sowmya to get married at a temple on the way to his village as the police arrest Mani and Ilavarasu.

The film ends on a comedic note as Jeeva is unable to freshen up to meet a prospective bride due to the mishap of the water tank, causing the disruption of the water supply.

== Cast ==
- Jiiva as Jeevarathnam
- Thambi Ramaiah as Mani
- Ilavarasu as Ilavarasu
- Prathana Nathan as Sowmya
- Sai Vignesh as Benny
- Subash Kannan as Kanniyappan "Kannis"
- Jenson Dhivakar as Thavidu alias Murthy
- Jaiwanth as Thiyagu
- Rajesh Pandian as Akhilan
- Sarjin Kumar as Balu
- Amith Mohan Rajeshwari as Rasu
- Anuraj OB as Paalraasu
- Sharath as Sanjay
- Shajeer P. Basheer as Pandi
- Sasti Pranesh as Kasi
- Surjith Gopinath as Nanji
- Savithri as Kalyani
- Manimegalai as Pushpa
- Mohan as Chellappan (Note: The character is named in the film but listed in the end credits as Mani's father.)
- Maala Parvathi as Jeevarathnam's mother
- Padmanabhan as Thavidu's assistant

Cameo appearances

- Shabana Shajahan Aryan as Divya
- Meenakshi Dinesh (in the song "Kalakalappa")

== Production ==
After the success of his directorial debut Falimy (2023), Nithish Sahadev was announced to collaborate on his next with Mammootty, in early-February 2025. With no information about that project, in mid-May 2025, a new announcement regarding Nithish's collaboration with Jiiva for his 45th film in the lead role was released, with a tentative title Jiiva45. The film is produced by Kannan Ravi under his Kannan Ravi Productions, and the cast includes Prathana Nathan as another lead in her maiden collaboration with Jiiva and Thambi Ramaiah in an important role. Principal photography began on 9 May 2025, and wrapped in mid-July 2025. On 1 October, Ayudha Puja, through a first-look poster, the film's title was revealed to be Thalaivar Thambi Thalaimaiyil. The film was in the post-production stage by the time of its teaser release in mid-October.

== Soundtrack ==
The music was composed by Vishnu Vijay.

1. "TTT" – Arivu, Vishnu Vijay
2. "Kalakalappa" – Vishnu Vijay
3. "Apaayam" – Anthony Daasan, Vishnu Vijay
4. "Kaarkoonthal Azhake" – Karthika Vaidyanathan, Vishnu Vijay
5. "Adchu Vidu" – K. S. Harisankar, Vishnu Vijay
6. "Rosave" – Kapil Kapilan, Vishnu Vijay
7. "Poyi Vaadi" – Shakthisree Gopalan, Vishnu Vijay

== Release ==
=== Theatrical ===
Due to Jana Nayagan getting postponed from its scheduled 9 January 2026 date, Thalaivar Thambi Thalaimayil was released in theatres on 15 January 2026 during Pongal, advanced from its earlier release date, 30 January 2026.

=== Home media ===
The digital rights were acquired by Netflix and began streaming from 12 February 2026.

== Reception ==
Abhinav Subramanian of The Times of India gave 3 out of 5 stars and wrote "The laughs come through texture rather than big setups: a reaction held just long enough, [...] You likely won't recall much of the film in a few days, but it is a good festival watch. There's craft in knowing your lane and staying in it." Akshay Kumar of Cinema Express gave 3 out of 5 stars and wrote "Thalaivar Thambi Thalaimaiyil is zany, crazy, farcical, and a largely entertaining fare. [...] Despite the bumps, Nithish Sahadev, in his Tamil debut, is off to a pretty good start. In a runtime under two hours, he manages to commit mistakes, dust them all off, and keeps the damage control graceful everytime throughout this fun and compact ride." Anusha Sundar of OTTPlay gave 3 out of 5 stars and wrote "Thalaivar Thambi Thalaimaiyil is an honest film that delivers fun, laughter, and gentle commentary on ego and unity. With relatable characters and situations, it becomes a refreshing watch, backed by rooted writing, effective comedy, and solid performances."

Janani K of India Today gave 3 out of 5 stars and wrote "Thalaivar Thambi Thalaimayil is an earnest attempt at a simple satire that revolves around human emotions and complexities. With harmless comedy, rooted performances and honest depiction of emotions, Nithish Sahadev's work presents a beautiful take on life in villages." Bhuvanesh Chandar of The Hindu wrote "Thalaivar Thambi Thalaimaiyil is precisely the kind of grounded dramedy that Tamil cinema fans who watch Malayalam films have yearned for. Now let's hope that more actors and producers see value in pursuing such gems, and perhaps this might be the start of a healthy trend of Malayalam-esque Tamil films — that is never a wrong thing to aspire for."
