= Om Shanti Shanti Shantihi =

2026 film by A. R. Sajeev

- Theatrical release poster
- Directed by: A. R. Sajeev
- Screenplay by: A. R. Sajeev; Nanda Kishore Emani (dialogue)
- Based on: Jaya Jaya Jaya Jaya Hey by Vipin Das
- Produced by: Srujan Yarabolu; Aditya Pittie; Vivek Krishnani; Anup Chandrasekharan; Sadhik Shaik; Naveen Sanivarapu
- Starring: Tharun Bhascker; Eesha Rebba
- Cinematography: Deepak Yaragera
- Edited by: A. R. Sajeev
- Music by: Jay Krish
- Production companies: S Originals; Movie Verse Studios
- Release date: 30 January 2026
- Running time: 130 minutes
- Country: India
- Language: Telugu

Om Shanti Shanti Shantihi (Shanti Mantra; lit. 'Om, Peace, Peace, Peace') is a 2026 Indian Telugu-language comedy drama film directed by A. R. Sajeev. It is a remake of the 2022 Malayalam-language film Jaya Jaya Jaya Jaya Hey. The film stars Tharun Bhascker and Eesha Rebba. The plot follows Prashanthi (Rebba), who unwillingly marries Omkar Naidu (Bhascker), a short-tempered male chauvinist. Upon receiving no support while suffering domestic violence, Prashanthi decides to resist.

Principal photography of the film began in April 2024 and wrapped up in December 2025, with majority of the filming taking place in Rajamahendravaram. The film was theatrically released on 30 January 2026.

== Plot ==
Prashanthi gives up her dreams for love, only to fall into abusive relationships first with her lecturer and later with her husband, Omkar, who pretends to support her but turns violent and manipulative. After enduring trauma, betrayal, and a heartbreaking miscarriage, she secretly strengthens herself, escapes his control, and rebuilds her life by starting a successful business. When Omkar's abuse becomes public and reaches court, she refuses divorce, not out of love, but to ensure no other woman suffers the same fate.

== Cast ==
- Eesha Rebba as Kondaveeti Prashanthi
- Tharun Bhascker as Ambati Omkar Naidu
- Brahmaji as Pulasa Ramarao, Omkar's uncle
- Brahmanandam as Judge
- Sivannarayana Naripeddi as Prashanthi's father
- Bindu Chandramouli as Prashanthi's mother
- Dheeraj Athreya as Prashanth, Prashanthi's brother
- Goparaju Vijay as Prakasam, Prashanthi's uncle
- Surabhi Prabhavathi as Omkar's mother
- Anashvi Reddy as Karuna, Omkar's sister
- Rohini Reddy as Divorce Lawyer

== Production ==
In April 2024, actor-filmmaker Tharun Bhascker was signed to play the lead in the Telugu remake of the Malayalam film Jaya Jaya Jaya Jaya Hey. Actress Eesha Rebba was also signed for the film, and Rebba joined principal photography which commenced in Rajamahendravaram, Andhra Pradesh. Majority of the film was shot in Rajamahendravaram, and was wrapped up in December 2025. The film's title was announced in July 2025.

== Release ==
Om Shanti Shanti Shantihi was theatrically released on 30 January 2026. It was previously scheduled to release on 1 August 2025 but was postponed.

== Reception ==
Reviewing the film for The Hindu, Sangeetha Devi called "partly fun, partly simmering emotional drama" with "compelling performances" from Rebba and Bhascker. Moneycontrol's Bhawana Tanmayi stated it was a "faithful remake", which worked in parts, while Suresh Kavirayani of Cinema Express felt that the remake lacked the original's intensity. On technical aspects, Kavirayani added "the cinematography beautifully captures the Godavari landscape, adding visual appeal. The music, however, remains average and doesn’t elevate the emotional moments."

BVS Prakash of Deccan Chronicle, who rated the film 1 1/2 stars out of 5, criticized the film, saying, "the Telugu adaptation lacks the novelty, sharpness and emotional depth required to keep the audience engaged."
