= Sandeep Pradeep =

Indian actor

- Sandeep Pradeep in 2026
- Born: 2 May 1997 (age 29); Vaikom, Kerala, India
- Citizenship: Indian
- Occupation: Actor
- Years active: 2019–present

Sandeep Pradeep is an Indian actor who primarily works in the Malayalam film industry. He is best known for his roles in Falimy (2023), Alappuzha Gymkhana (2025), Padakkalam (2025), and ekō (2025). He was nominated for Best Comedian at the SIIMA Awards 2024.

== Early life ==
Sandeep completed his schooling at Lisieux English School, Vaikom. After completing his 12th Grade, he pursued a diploma in Advanced Visual Effects in Bangalore. During the COVID-19 pandemic, he worked as a VFX artist at a multinational company while actively continuing his involvement in independent short-film production.

== Career ==
Sandeep began his creative journey in 2013 through short films with a group of his friends under the alias Lumiere Broz, marking his early presence in the Malayalam indie film space. One of his initial short-film projects, Shanthi Muhurtham received recognition. He subsequently acted in Magneto, portraying a villainous role and VFX artist. He acted in the mini web series Kalyana Kacheri, directed by Anand Menen. He was also a notable cast member of the YouTube channel "Sub Originals".

In 2019, he made his feature film debut in Pathinettam Padi. Followed by Ek Din, a film that received recognition from the Kerala Critics Awards and several critics, although it was not officially released or made available to the public through theatrical or other distribution channels. He later appeared in Antakshari (2022) and Falimy (2023). His performance in Falimy earned critical acclaim and led to a nomination for Best Actor in a Comedy Role at the SIIMA Awards in 2024.

In 2025, he portrayed the character of a boxer in Alappuzha Gymkhana, and appeared in Padakkalam. Later that year, he played a prominent lead role in ekō. The film marked the third and final instalment of Bahul Ramesh's Animal Trilogy, following Kishkindha Kaandam (2024) and Kerala Crime Files 2 (2025). ekō was a major commercial success at the box office, grossing more than 50 crore.

== Filmography ==
=== Films ===
Year	Title	Role	Notes	Ref.
2019	Pathinettam Padi	Puthren	Debut film	
2022	Antakshari	Karthik		
2023	Falimy	Abhijith Chandran	Nominated–SIIMA Award for Best Comedian	
2025	Alappuzha Gymkhana	Shifas Ahmed		
2025	Padakkalam	Jithin		
2025	Eko	Peyoos		
2026	Cosmic Samson †	TBA	Filming	
2027	Picnic †	TBA		

=== Other work ===
Year	Title	Role	Notes	Ref.
2013	Story Screenplay Dialogue	Mohan	Short film	
2016	Shanthi Muhurtham	Karthik	Short film; also VFX and DI artist	
2019	Magneto		Short film; also VFX artist	
2021	Kalyana Kacheri	Diljith	Web series	
2023	Sana – Aaro Nee	Himself	Think Music India music video; also director and VFX artist	
