= Magneto (2019 film) =

Indian Malayalam fantasy thriller short film

- Promotional poster
- Directed by: Nithish Sahadev
- Written by: Nithish Sahadev
- Produced by: Al Jaseem Abdul Jabbar; Al Jassam Abdul Jabbar; Al Sajam Abdul Jabbar
- Starring: Anand Menen; Sandeep Pradeep
- Cinematography: Aswin Nandakumar
- Edited by: Anand Menon
- Music by: Ankit Menon
- Production company: Sulthan Brothers
- Release date: 24 May 2019
- Running time: 13 minutes
- Country: India
- Language: Malayalam

Magneto is a 2019 Indian Malayalam fantasy thriller short film written and directed by Nithish Sahadev. The short film stars Anand Menen, who also worked as the editor, alongside Sandeep Pradeep.

== Plot ==
Magneto is a mutant, who stands up against the X-Men with his power to create and control magnetic fields. He has been Alex’s childhood hero since the third grade and once Alex grows up, his attachment to the character enables himself to gain the power to levitate objects. However, he is caught by the police on charges of robbery and uses his powers to escape. He leaves behind a cloth that says "It's just a Beginning".

== Cast ==
- Anand Menen as Alex, who later embodies Magneto
- Nisthar
- Murali Chand
- Sandeep Pradeep
- Vipindas
- Laksmi Karat
- Rakesh Kumar
- Ashuthosh
- Jibin Nair

== Production ==
Nithish Sahadev was first introduced to Magneto by his friend Aswin Nandakumar on Facebook, who ended up being the cinematographer of this short film. In the post, a guy claimed to be Magneto and was arrested on drug charges, which formed the basis of the short film. Sahadev's friend, Al Jaseem Abdul Jabbar, co-produced the short film along with his brothers after hearing the idea but not the story and told Sahadev not to compromise on the quality. Actor Sandeep Pradeep did the VFX work for the short film.

== Music ==
The music was composed by Ankit Menon.

Track listing
No.	Title	Length
1.	"Nizhala En Kude"	1:08

== Release and reception ==
The short film upon release received 89,000 views on YouTube upon release and his since received 166,000 views. The short film was shared by actors Soubin Shahir, Aishwarya Lekshmi, Vijay Babu and singer Benny Dayal.

Gokul m.g of Deccan Chronicle wrote, "The VFX and the background music of the film are really great. They back the narration and some wonderful acting, absolutely well and keep the audience excited".
