= Aabhyanthara Kuttavaali =

2025 film by Sethunath Padmakumar

Aabhyanthara Kuttavali
- Theatrical release poster
- Directed by: Sethunath Padmakumar
- Written by: Sethunath Padmakumar
- Produced by: Naisam Salam
- Starring: Asif Ali; Thulasi; Jagadish; Harisree Ashokan
- Cinematography: Ajay David Kachappilly
- Edited by: Sobin K Soman
- Music by: Songs: Bijibal; Muthu; Christy Joby; Score: Rahul Raj
- Production company: Naisam Salam Productions
- Distributed by: Dream Big Films (India); Phars Films (International)
- Release date: 6 June 2025
- Running time: 121 minutes
- Country: India
- Language: Malayalam

Aabhyanthara Kuttavaali (Malayalam: അഭ്യന്തര കുറ്റവാളി; transl. Domestic Criminal) is a 2025 Indian Malayalam-language comedy-drama film written and directed by debutant Sethunath Padmakumar. The film stars Asif Ali alongside newcomer actress Thulasi, Jagadish, and Harisree Ashokan in lead roles.

The film received mixed-to-negative reviews.

== Plot ==
Sahadevan, a civil engineer employed in a temporary government position, is overjoyed to marry Nayana (Thulasi), the woman of his dreams, in a grand wedding. However, his life takes a drastic turn when Nayana files a complaint accusing him and his family of domestic violence and dowry harassment under Section 498A. The allegations lead to Sahadevan's arrest and public humiliation, severely impacting his personal and professional life.

As Sahadevan navigates the legal and social repercussions of the false accusations, he encounters Advocate Anila (Shreya Rukmini), who becomes his legal counsel. Throughout the trial, Sahadevan's character and integrity are questioned, and he faces emotional and psychological challenges. The film delves into the complexities of legal systems, societal perceptions, and the impact of false allegations on individuals and families.

In the courtroom, Advocate Vishwanathan (Jagadish) represents Nayana. The narrative unfolds through various legal proceedings, highlighting the adversities faced by Sahadevan and his struggle to clear his name. The film culminates in a poignant resolution, addressing themes of justice, truth, and the consequences of misusing legal provisions.

== Cast ==
- Asif Ali as Sahadevan
- Thulasi as Nayana
- Shreya Rukmini as Advocate Anila
- Jagadish as Advocate Vishwanathan
- Joji Mundakayam as CI Prathapan
- Vijayakumar as Advocate Rex Arackal
- Harisree Ashokan as Makkar
- Rini Udayakumar as Chithootha
- Athira Sreekumar as Suhana
- Azees Nedumangad as Deshavasi
- Anand Manmadhan as Judas
- Prem Kumar as Anirudhan
- Sidharth Bharathan as Peter
- Sukesh Roy as Judge
- Gopu Kesav as Nayana's father
- Usha Chandrababu as Nayana's mother
- Balachandran Chullikkad as Sahadevan's father
- Neeraja Rajendran as Padmavathiyamma
- Kalesh Kannattu as Postman Lonappan
- Greeshma as Councillor Dr.Ayisha

== Production ==
=== Development and pre-production ===
The film is directed by Sethunath Padmakumar in his directorial debut. The story is said to be a comedy-drama tackling issues related to patriarchy.

=== Filming ===
Principal photography started in August 2024 in Thriprayar, Kerala. The shoot was completed by early October 2024.

== Music ==
The songs were composed by Bijibal, Muthu, and Christy Joby, while Rahul Raj composed the background score.

== Release ==
=== Theatrical ===
Aabhyanthara Kuttavaali was released on 6 June 2025. The film was initially scheduled to release on 3 April 2025, however, the release was postponed due to financial disputes and other issues.

=== Legal and financial issues ===
Producer Naisam Salam confirmed financial difficulties that have delayed the release. The financier has also approached the Kerala Film Chamber of Commerce regarding disputes.

== Reception ==
=== Critical reception ===
Aabhyanthara Kuttavaali received mixed reviews from critics.

S. R. Praveen of The Hindu wrote, "Aabhyanthara Kuttavaali falters when it generalises a few instances of women misusing Section 498A, while closing its eyes to the numerous cases of domestic abuse and dowry harassment and deaths of women which necessitated the framing of such a law."

Anandu Suresh of The Indian Express rated the film 1.5/5 stars and wrote, "Although the Asif Ali-starrer mentions at the start that it is a 'work of fiction', the movie leaves no opportunity to generalise things and give good conduct certificates to men."

Vignesh Madhu of The New Indian Express wrote, "The Asif Ali-starrer aims to highlight men's issues but stumbles into regressive territory and oversimplifying a sensitive subject with preachy writing and poor character depth."

Latha Srinivasan of Hindustan Times rated the film 1.5/5 stars and wrote, "Aabhyanthara Kuttavaali has the right idea of talking about men’s rights, but the director and the story are truly misguided."
