= Mazhavil Entertainment Awards =

Indian award ceremony

- Awarded for: Excellence in film achievement for Malayalam cinema
- Country: India
- Presented by: Mazhavil Manorama
- First award: 2021

The Mazhavil Entertainment Awards is an award ceremony for films presented by Mazhavil Manorama, a Malayalam-language television network from the state of Kerala.

The most recent was award show is being held on 7 and 8 September 2024,

== Awards categories ==
- Entertainment Actor of the Year
- Best Choreographer
- Stunt
- Special Awards
- Entertainer of the Year

== Awards for actor and actress ==
=== Entertainment Actor of the Year – Male ===
The Mazhavil Manorama Film Award for Best Entertainment actor of the year has been awarded.

| Year | Winner | Film(s) |
|---|---|---|
| 2019-2020 | Biju Menon | Ayyappanum Koshiyum |
| 2020-21 | Jayasurya | Vellam |
| 2022 | Dulquer Salmaan | Kurup |
| 2022 | Tovino Thomas | Minnal Murali |
| 2023 | Tovino Thomas | Various films |
| 2023 | Kunchacko Boban | Nna Thaan Case Kodu |
| 2024 | Mammootty | Bramayugam, Kaathal – The Core |
| 2025 | Mohanlal | Thudarum |

=== Entertainment Actor of the Year – Female ===
The Mazhavil Manorama Film Award for Best Entertainment actor-Female of the year has been awarded.

| Year | Winner | Film(s) |
|---|---|---|
| 2019-2020 | Manju Warrier | Prathi Poovankozhi |
| 2020-21 | Anaswara Rajan | Vaanku |
| 2022 | Navya Nair | Oruthee |
| 2023 | Darshana Rajendran | Jaya Jaya Jaya Jaya Hey |
| 2024 | Anaswara Rajan | Neru |
| 2025 | Lijomol Jose | Ponman, Samshayam |

== Technical Awards ==
=== Best Choreographer ===
The Mazhavil Manorama Film Award for Best Choreographer has been awarded.

| Year | Winner | Film(s) |
|---|---|---|
| 2024 | Sandy | RDX |

=== Stunt ===
The Mazhavil Manorama Film Award for Stunt has been awarded.

| Year | Winner | Film(s) |
|---|---|---|
| 2024 | Phoenix Prabhu | Turbo |

== Special awards ==
The Mazhavil Manorama Film Award for Special Awards has been awarded.

| Year | Winner | Achievement |
|---|---|---|
| 2024 | Urvashi | Master of Entertainment Actor |
| 2024 | Sheela | Best Evergreen Actor |
| 2025 | Jayaram | Master or Entertainer Actor |

== Other Awards ==
=== Best Entertainer of the Year ===
| Year | Award | Winner | Film(s) |
|---|---|---|---|
| 2025 | Debut | Jithin Laal | ARM |
| 2025 | Upcoming Project | Dinjith Ayyathan | Kishkindha Kaandam |
| 2025 | Upcoming Actor | Siju Sunny | Various films |

== See also ==
- Asianet Film Awards
