= Devi Ajith =

Indian actress, dancer

- Born: Thiruvananthapuram, Kerala, India
- Occupation: Actor
- Spouse: Ajith Kumar (m. 1992; died 1997)
- Children: Nandana Ajith
- Parents: V. Ramachandran Nair; S. Lalithambika Devi

Devi Ajith is an Indian actress, dancer and a television personality in the Malayalam film industry. She is known for her roles in Trivandrum Lodge and Immanuel. She also appeared in the short film, Virgin Road. She has been running a boutique in Thiruvananthapuram named Scarlet since 20 years.

== Personal life ==
Born and brought up in Thiruvananthapuram, Kerala, Devi started her career with Asianet as the anchor of Pattupetty. She is the daughter of professors V. Ramachandran Nair and S. Lalithambika Devi.

At the age of 19, Devi married Ajith Kumar, producer of The Car (1997). He died in a car accident in 1997 during the production of the film.

Their daughter, Nandana Ajith (b. 1993), works as a digital analyst in Fashionobi, Milan, Italy. Nandana got married in 2021.

== Filmography ==
Key
| † | Denotes films that have not yet been released |

| Year | Title | Role(s) | Notes |
|---|---|---|---|
| 2000 | Mazha | Gayathri | debut |
| 2002 | Uthara | Vishalam | |
| 2003 | Ivar | Reetha | |
| 2009 | Seetha Kalyanam | Devi | |
| | Arikil Oral Koode | Hema | Telefilm |
| | Sthree Parvam Navam | - | Telefilm |
| 2012 | Trivandrum Lodge | Zarina | Comeback film |
| 2012 | Cupid | Vijayalakshmi | Short film |
| 2013 | Zachariayude Garbhinikal | Zaira's Mother | |
| 2013 | Kaanchi | Rugmini | |
| 2013 | Immanuel | Sandy Wilson | |
| 2013 | Virgin Road | Arundhati | |
| 2014 | Onnum Mindathe | Lizzy Jose | |
| 2014 | Peruchazhi | Francis Kunjappan's lady friend | |
| 2014 | Sooraiyadal | - | Tamil film |
| 2014 | Ankuram | Amma | Short film |
| 2015 | Adi Kapyare Kootamani | Adhishta Lakshmi's Mother | |
| 2015 | Ennu Ninte Moideen | Moideen's aunt | |
| 2015 | TP 51 Vettu | Rema | |
| 2015 | Kanal | Jalaja, Raghu's wife | |
| 2015 | Nirnayakam | Collector | |
| 2015 | Bhaskar the Rascal | x | Edited scene |
| 2015 | Appavum Veenjum | Bride's mom | |
| 2015 | Mili | Hostel Warden | |
| 2015 | Mariyam Mukku | Kathreena | |
| 2015 | Yennai Arindhaal | Sathyadev's family friend | Tamil film |
| 2016 | Ore Mukham | Mary/Ann Maria | |
| 2016 | Kolumittayi | Unnikrishnan's mother | |
| 2016 | Guppy | Aamina's grandmother | |
| 2016 | Hallelooya | Susy | |
| 2016 | Mudhugauv | External examiner | |
| 2016 | Action Hero Biju | Rizwan's mother | |
| 2017 | Varnyathil Aashanka | Shivan's neighbour | |
| 2017 | Dance Dance | Revathy | |
| 2017 | Take Off | Dr. Soosanne | |
| 2017 | Devayanam | - | |
| 2017 | Neethee-be the flame | Deeptha | Short film |
| 2017 | Omanathinkal | Amma | Album |
| 2018 | Ente Sathyanweshana Pareekshakal | —N/a | Voice only |
| 2018 | Ennaalum Sarath..? | Navas Sherif's mother | |
| 2018 | Kaithola Chathan | Ponnamma | |
| 2018 | Keni; Kinar | Female Magazine Head | Tamil; Malayalam (Bilingual; uncredited) |
| 2018 | Idiyappam | Umma | Short film |
| 2019 | Rakthasakshyam | Ayisha | |
| 2019 | Marconi Mathai | Luca's wife | |
| 2019 | Luca | Forensic surgeon | |
| 2019 | Lotus Eye Hospital | Herself | Corporate film |
| 2020 | Forensic | Divya's mother | |
| 2020 | Gauthamante Radham | Sreelekha | |
| 2020 | Thallum Pidiyum | Sheeja | |
| 2021 | Tsunami | Jolly | |
| 2021 | 18 Hours | Geetha | Direct to Television |
| 2022 | Lal Jose | Nandu's mother | |
| 2022 | Perfume | Margaret | |
| 2022 | Autorickshawkarante Bharya | Srella Louis | |
| 2022 | Heaven | Public Prosecutor | |
| 2022 | Shalabha Mazha | Amma | Music video |
| 2022 | Sayanna Varthakal | Usha | |
| 2022 | Meri Awas Suno | Dr. Shyni | |
| 2023 | Thaal | | |
| 2023 | Jawanum Mullapoovum | | |
| 2024 | Madithattu | Shobhana | Short film |
| 2025 | Nancy Rani | Dr. Arundhati | |
| TBA | Vakku † | TBA | post production |
| TBA | Lust 69 | | Filming; Webseries |
| TBA | Lillith | | Filming |
| TBA | Naja | | Filming |
| TBA | Aaram Thirukalpana | Lawyer | Filming |
| TBA | Ethire | Nun | Filming |
| TBA | Chila Nerangalil Chilar | | Filming |
| TBA | Oru Wayanadan Katha | | Filming |
| TBA | Jallianwala Bagh | College Principal | Filming |

== Other works ==
=== As costume designer (film) ===
- The Car (1997)

=== As producer (film) ===
- Panchara Paalu Mittayi (Pre-production)
- The Car (1997)

== Television ==
=== TV serials ===
- Manal Nagaram (DD Malayalam)
- Nakshatrangal Ariyate (DD Malayalam)
- Eeran Nilavu (Flowers TV)
- Kshanaprabhachanchalam (Amrita TV)
- Chackoyum Maryyum (Mazhavil Manorama)
- Varnappakittu (Surya TV)
- Aanpirannol (Amrita TV)
- Ammayariyathe (Asianet)

=== TV shows as a host ===
- Pattupetty (Asianet)
- Kalyan Cine Show (Asianet)
- Heartbeats (Asianet)
- Tele Quiz (Asianet)
- Super Hitukalude Katha (Asianet)
- Comedy Times (Surya TV)
- Where To?
- Devamrutham (Kaumudy TV)
- Onam Payasamela (Flowers TV)
- Ponnonanaalile Payasamela (Kaumudy TV)

=== TV shows as a guest ===
- Comedy Stars (Asianet)
- Annie's Kitchen (Amrita TV)
- I Personally (Kappa TV)
- Star Jam (Kappa TV)
- Run Baby Run (Asianet)
- Onnum Onnum Moonu (Mazhavil Manorama)
- Dream Drive (Kaumudy TV)
- On the Spot (One TV)
- Ivide Ingananu Bhai (Mazhavil Manorama)
- Comedy Super Nite (Flowers TV)
- Malayali Darbar (Amrita TV) - Panelist
- Smart Show (Flowers TV) - Participant
- Bold and Beautiful (DD Malayalam)
- Day with a Star (Kaumudy TV)
- Parayam Nedam (Amrita TV) - Participant
