= Nunakkuzhi =

Indian crime comedy film

- Theatrical release poster
- Directed by: Jeethu Joseph
- Written by: K. R. Krishna Kumar
- Produced by: Siddharth Anand Kumar; Vikram Mehra; Rohandeep Singh
- Starring: Basil Joseph; Grace Antony; Nikhila Vimal; Siddique
- Cinematography: Satheesh Kurup
- Edited by: V. S. Vinayak
- Music by: Songs: Jay Unnithan; Vishnu Shyam; Score: Vishnu Shyam
- Production companies: Yoodlee Films; Saregama
- Distributed by: Saregama; Vintage Films
- Release date: 15 August 2024 (India)
- Country: India
- Language: Malayalam
- Box office: ₹23 crore

Nunakkuzhi (transl. Dimple or pit of lies) is a 2024 Indian Malayalam-language crime comedy film directed by Jeethu Joseph. The film stars Basil Joseph, Grace Antony, and Nikhila Vimal in the lead roles alongside Siddique, Manoj K. Jayan, Baiju Santhosh, Binu Pappu, Saiju Kurup, Aju Varghese and Althaf Salim in supporting roles.

The film received generally positive reviews from critics and audiences alike and was a commercial success at the box-office.

== Plot ==
A young, rich businessman's life is going well till his company becomes the target of a high-profile IT raid. The raid by government officials exposes a web of tax evasion and illegal activities within his organization.

== Cast ==
- Basil Joseph as Eby Zachariah Poozhikunnel
- Grace Antony as Rashmitha Ranjith
- Nikhila Vimal as Rimi, Eby's wife
- Siddique as Income Tax Assistant Commissioner Balakrishnan
- Manoj K. Jayan as Actor Sundar Nath
- Baiju Santhosh as CI Abraham Tharakan
- Binu Pappu as Producer Sajan Chamakkala
- Aju Varghese as Ranjith, Rashmitha's husband
- Althaf Salim as Naveen, Balakrishnan's nephew
- Shyam Mohan as Vineeth
- Azees Nedumangad as CPO Santhosh
- Saiju Kurup as Jayadevan
- Swasika as Maya, Sundar's wife and Jayadevan's girlfriend
- Lena as Nancy, Eby's mother
- Selvaraj as CPO Sadanandan
- Mathew Varghese as Zachariah Poozhikunnel, Eby's father (photo archive)
- Dinesh Prabhakar as Gunda Shaji
- Jayakumar Parameswaran Pillai as Magistrate
- Rajesh Paravoor as Adv. James
- Riyas Narmakala as Doctor
- Harisree Yousuf as Krishnamoorthy
- Sundarapandiyan as Gunda Anil
- Kalabhavan Jinto as a flat resident
- Soumya as Abraham's wife
- Bhasi Vaikkom as Kuriakose
- Sanaji as Kuriakose's helper
- Eldho as Rashmitha's Advocate
- Elizabeth as Nurse
- Ratheesh as Sanal, Eby's driver

== Release ==
=== Theatrical ===
Nunakkuzhi released in theatres on 15 August 2024.

=== Home media ===
Following its theatrical performance, the film is premiered on ZEE5 on 13 September 2024.

== Soundtrack ==
The film's music was composed by Jay Unnithan and Vishnu Shyam. The lyrics were written by Vinayak Sasikumar.

Nunakkuzhi

Soundtrack album by Jay Unnithan, Vishnu Shyam
- Released: January 8, 2026
- Genre: Feature film soundtrack
- Length: 42:56
- Label: Saregama

All tracks are written by Vinayak Sasikumar.

No.	Title	Music	Singer(s)	Length
1.	"Hallelujah"	Jay Unnithan	Rajat Prakash, Sanu PS	3:42
2.	"Nunakkuzhi Title Track"	Vishnu Shyam	Vaishnav Girish	2:37
3.	"Nunakkuzhi Trailer Theme"	Vishnu Shyam	Vaishnav Girish	2:24

== Reception ==
Nunakuzhi received positive reviews from critics on release. Rohit Panicker of Times Now rated the film 3.5/5 and wrote: "A Fun, Entertaining Film That Delivers As Promised" S. R. Praveen wrote, "On the whole, Nunakuzhi is a briskly-paced fun ride, which proves that Jeethu Joseph is adept at more than just thrillers." Anandu Suresh of The Indian Express wrote, "For those who prefer only subtle situational comedy, Nunakuzhi may seem loud, over-the-top and even grating. But for those who enjoy comedy that unfolds through a chain reaction of events, eventually spiralling into complete chaos, this Jeethu Joseph film could be just what you need this week." Princy Alexander of Onmanorama wrote:"An eccentric Basil Joseph stars in a fun Jeethu Joseph film"
