= Anand Menen =

Indian film director

- Born: 7 November 1994 (age 31); Vaikom, Kottayam, Kerala, India
- Education: Bachelor of Arts (English); Diploma in Filmmaking
- Occupations: Film director; Film writer
- Years active: 2013–present
- Notable work: Vaazha – Biopic of a Billion Boys (2024)

Anand Menen is an Indian film director who primarily works in the Malayalam film industry. He is well known for his works in Gauthamante Radham (2020) Vaazha – Biopic of a Billion Boys (2024).

== Career ==
Anand was born in Vaikom, Kerala. He began creating short films in 2013. Anand pursued a diploma in movie production.

He started his career directing and producing short films along with Lumiere Broz, a team started by Anand and his friends. He directed and edited short films like Kutty Rashtriyam, Psycho, Shanti Muhurtham, and Magneto.

In 2020, he directed and edited a short series titled Kalyana Kacheri for a YouTube channel SUB Originals.

The same year, he directed the film Gauthamante Radham starring Neeraj Madhav, Valsala Menon, Renji Panicker and Hareesh Kanaran. He was also the screenplay and script writer of the movie.

In 2024, he directed the film Vaazha – Biopic of a Billion Boys, starring Jagadish, Kottayam Nazeer, Azees Nedumangad. The film grossed ₹1.5 crores worldwide on the first day of the release.

== Filmography ==
=== As director ===
Year	Title	Credited as			Notes	Ref
Year	Title	Director	Writer	Editor	Notes	Ref
2016	Shanti Muhurtham	Yes	Yes	Yes	Short film	
2020	Gauthamante Radham	Yes	Yes	No		
2020	Kalyana Kacheri	Yes	No	Yes	Web series	
2024	Vaazha – Biopic of a Billion Boys	Yes	No	No		
	Happiloop †	Yes	No	No	In pre-production	

=== As actor ===
Year	Title	Role	Notes	Ref
2019	Magneto	Alex	Short film; also editor	
2022	Antakshari	Niranjan		
2023	Falimy	Abhi's friend		
