= Vaazha II: Biopic of a Billion Bros =

2026 Indian film

- Theatrical release poster
- Directed by: Savin SA
- Written by: Vipin Das
- Produced by: Vipin Das; Harris Desom; Sahu Garapati; P. B. Anish; Adarsh Narayan; Icon Studios
- Starring: Hashir H; Alan Siraj; Ajin Joy; Vinayak
- Cinematography: Akhil Lailasuran
- Edited by: Kannan Mohan
- Music by: Songs: Malayali Monkeys; Rajat Prakash; Parvatish Pradeep; Rzee; Muthu; Arcado; Jazir Muhammed; Ashwin Aryan; Electronic Kili; Background score: A Team
- Production companies: Imagin Cinemas; WBTS Productions; Shine Screens; Signature Studios; Icon Studios
- Distributed by: AP International; Home Screen Entertainment; Berkshire Dream House; Icon Cinemas
- Release date: 2 April 2026
- Running time: 165 minutes
- Country: India
- Language: Malayalam
- Budget: ₹10–12 crore
- Box office: ₹234–235 crore

Vaazha II: Biopic of a Billion Bros (lit. 'Plantain II: Biopic of a Billion Bros') is a 2026 Indian Malayalam-language coming-of-age comedy-drama film directed by Savin SA (in his directorial debut) and written by Vipin Das. It is a spiritual sequel to Vaazha: Biopic of a Billion Boys (2024). The film stars Hashir H., Alan Bin Siraj, Ajin Joy and Vinayak V alongside Devaraj, Vijay Babu, Bijukuttan, Alphonse Puthren, and Sudheesh in supporting roles.

Principal photography took place from April to November 2025, shot in Ernakulam, the United Arab Emirates, and Georgia. Vaazha II: Biopic of a Billion Bros was released on 2 April 2026. The film received positive reviews from critics. It was a commercial success and has emerged as the highest-grossing film of all time in Kerala, where it has grossed over ₹124 crore, as well as the third highest-grossing Malayalam film of 2026, fifth highest-grossing Malayalam film of all time, and fourth highest-grossing Indian film of 2026.

== Plot ==
Hashir, Alan, Ajin and Vinayak are close friends whose behavior and relationships with classmates often place them at odds with their teachers. Tensions escalate after Alan's sister Ashna is caught at a theatre, skipping class, and a teacher named Mujeeb publicly humiliates her before her parents, prompting Alan and Hashir to assault him. The four friends later face further trouble after being caught abusing drugs obtained from a shopkeeper near their school, leading to a violent altercation in which Manoj Sir is accidentally injured. DySP Xavier Alexander later attributes the incident to both parental negligence and Mujeeb's misconduct, and the boys are ultimately allowed to sit for their examinations. Over time, the friends drift apart. Hashir fails his higher secondary examinations and remains in India, Ajin moves to Dubai to work with his brother Sajin, and Alan and Vinayak leave for the United Kingdom, where they struggle to adapt to life abroad.

Despite the distance, they continue to miss one another deeply. Sajin convinces Ajin that he didn't want him to suffer like him and they had a worthless father who always claims to be looking after their family only by giving orders and spending leisure at home, whereas their mother is the one who makes the ends meet. Hashir discovers that his younger brother uses drugs and confronts him, explaining the harmful consequences of drug use and warning him against continuing down that path. Vinayak falls seriously ill, prompting Alan to try to obtain medicine for him and travel to be by his side.

In the climax, the four friends each face major personal turning points. While trying to obtain medicine for the seriously ill Vinayak, Alan, who finally got medicine from another friend, speaks to his younger sister on the phone and, during the conversation, decides to take responsibility for her future by helping finance her higher education. Hashir takes responsibility for his younger brother's accusation of drug use, protecting him from the consequences, and later ends his relationship with Shyna, telling her that she deserves a better man than him. Meanwhile, Ajin and his brother Sajin discuss their difficult working conditions and devise a plan to escape them: Sajin will return to India, complete his education and secure a proper job, after which he will help Ajin return to India and complete his own education. Vinayak, meanwhile, remains seriously ill and waits on a bench outside a clinic. As he struggles with his condition and loneliness following his father's death, he imagines his father appearing before him and falls asleep with his head resting on his father's lap. The sequence highlights the friends' transition from their carefree youth toward taking responsibility for themselves and their families.

He leaves a flashback revealing that Hashir, aided by his friends Ajo, Moosa, Vivek, Abdul and Vishnu had retaliated against Ameen and his friends after having earlier been assaulted by them at Ajo's lover Maya's wedding.

== Cast ==
- Hashir H. as Hashir
  - Athrey Baiju Raj as teen Hashir
    - Abhimanyu as young Hashir
- Alan Bin Siraj as Alan Shiyaas
  - Anandhu as young Alan
- Ajin Joy as Ajin
- Vinayak V. as Vinayak Rajan
  - Diyan Dinu as Young Vinayak
- Angel Maria as Shyna, Ameen's sister and Hashir's love interest
- Veda Shankar as Ashna, Alan's sister
  - Sasha Isla as young Ashna
- Devaraj Sajin as Sajin, Ajin's elder brother
- Bijukuttan as Rajan, Vinayak's father
- Kannan Sagar as Rajan's elder brother
- Sabari as Nashir, Hashir's younger brother
- Aju Varghese as Manoj sir
- Alphonse Puthren as DySP Xavier Alexander
- Sudheesh as Shiyaas, Alan's father
- Vijay Babu as Mujeeb Sir
- Vinod Kedamangalam as Joy, Sajin and Ajin's father
- Aswathy Chandra Kishor as Hashir's mother
- Reena Indrayani as Headmistress
- Arun Kumar as Manu P. Sadashivan aka Kuttettan
- Al Ameen as Ameen, Shyna's brother
- Nihal Nizam as Nihal
- Krishna Prasad as police inspector at the theatre
- Nibraz Noushad as Nibraz
- Shahubas as Shahubas
- Aaradhya Sai as Aaradhya, Alan's love interest
- Kudassanad Kanakam as Alan and Ashna's grandmother
- Sreekutti K Nair as Lekha teacher
- Manjusree Nair as Teacher
- Sreenath P. S. as Johnny, Alan's Friend In Georgia
- Adarsh Narayan as Binu
- Raveendran as Benny
- Lakshmi Dhanya Saju as Lakshmi , Hashir's and Alan's classmate
- Nidhinya as Alan's mother
- Letha Das as Sajin and Ajin's mother

=== Cameos ===
- Joemon Jyothir as Muhammad Al Bin Salim "Moosa" Ibrahim
- Siju Sunny as Ajo Thomas
- Amith Mohan Rajeshwari as Vishnu Radhakrishnan
- Anshid Anu as Vivek Anand
- Anuraj O. B. as Abdul Kalam
- Saaf as B. C. Vishwam
- Jai Krishnan Sreekumar as Kannan
- Meenakshi Unnikrishnan as Maya
- P. B. Anish as Maya's father
- Kottayam Nazeer as Radhakrishnan
- Azees Nedumangad as Thomachan
- Noby Marcose as Ibrahim
- Gibin Gopinath as Vivek's father
- Arunsol as Kalam's father
- Savin SA as Construction Worker (uncredited)
- Puliyanam Poulose (uncredited)

== Production ==
The film was officially announced in August 2024 as a sequel to Vaazha: Biopic of a Billion Boys (2024). The project marks the directorial debut of Savin S. A., with Vipin Das returning as writer and producer.

Filming began in April 2025 in Thrikkakkara, then shifted to the United Arab Emirates and concluded in Georgia. The 115 day shoot was completely by mid November 2025.

== Soundtrack ==
The background score was composed by A Team, while the 10 songs were composed by nine composers: Malayali Monkeys, Rajat Prakash, Parvatish Pradeep, Rzee, Muthu, Arcado, Jazir Muhammed, Ashwin Aryan and Electronic Kili. The audio rights were acquired by Think Music. The first single, "Vanilla Chediye", composed by Rajat Prakash, was released on 26 February 2026. The last single, "Kochu Keralam", was composed by Malayali Monkeys on 18 March 2026.

== Release ==
Vaazha II: Biopic of a Billion Bros was released in theatres worldwide on 2 April 2026. The film was distributed by Icon Cinemas in Kerala. The overseas distribution rights were acquired by AP International, Home Screen Entertainment, and Berkshire Dream House.

=== Home media ===
The post-theatrical digital streaming rights of Vaazha II were acquired by JioHotstar. The film began streaming on the platform from 8 May 2026.

== Reception ==
=== Box office ===
The film grossed ₹5.20 crore in Kerala on its first day. It earned ₹26.50 crore from Kerala in its first weekend (4 days), with a worldwide total around ₹65 crore. In 7 days, the film surpassed ₹100 crore worldwide. In 16 days, it crossed ₹100 crore in Kerala alone, becoming the third and the fastest film to do so. In 18 days, it surpassed ₹200 crore globally, becoming the fifth Malayalam film to do so. In 24 days, it grossed ₹121 crore in Kerala, surpassing Lokah Chapter 1: Chandra to become the highest grossing film of all time in Kerala..

=== Critical response ===
Vaazha II: Biopic of a Billion Bros received positive reviews from critics. Sreeju Sudhakaran of Rediff gave 4 out of 5 stars and wrote, "Vaazha 2 grows beyond the shadow of its predecessor by refining its tone, strengthening its themes, and delivering more assured emotional beats and performances". Sanjay Ponnappa of India Today gave 4 out of 5 stars and wrote that the film is "more than just a nostalgic trip – it's a heartfelt coming-of-age tale that blends humour, chaos, and emotion with impressive craft.

Gopika I. S. of The Times of India gave 3.5 out of 5 stars and wrote that the film is "funnier, quirkier and slick. The theme, the emotions and the ideas resemble Vaazha 1, and at the same time it feels fresh, relatable and compelling in its narrative choices".

Vivek Santhosh of The New Indian Express gave 3 out of 5 stars and wrote, "In the end, Vaazha II feels very much like an Instagram reel expanded into a feature film, filled with humour, life lessons and a fair bit of chaos. It does not quite capture the emotional depth of its predecessor, but thanks to its engaging central performances and consistently amusing moments, it remains a fairly enjoyable watch". Anandu Suresh of The Indian Express gave 3 out of 5 stars and wrote, "While Hashir, Alan, Ajin, and Vinayak (playing characters named after themselves) are perfect in their roles — with Alan being particularly impressive — it's almost impossible to assess their acting potential from this one movie, since they largely portray their public personas, which carry many elements of their real selves".

== Sequel ==
On 13 April 2026, writer Vipin Das shared a social media post hinting at a third installment in the series. On 14 April 2026, a sequel titled Vaazha 3: Biopic of a Billion Girls was announced, to be directed by debutant Viswan Sreejith who was the assistant director of Vaazha II.
