= Gauthamante Radham =

2020 Malayalam comedy-drama film

- Theatrical release poster
- Directed by: Anand Menen
- Written by: Anand Menen
- Produced by: KG Anil Kumar
- Starring: Neeraj Madhav; Valsala Menon; Punya Elizabeth Bose; Renji Panicker; Hareesh Kanaran
- Cinematography: Vishnu Sarma
- Edited by: Appu N. Bhattathiri
- Music by: Ankit Menon; Anuraj O. B.
- Production company: Funtastic films
- Distributed by: Funtastic Films
- Release date: 31 January 2020
- Running time: 128 minutes
- Country: India
- Language: Malayalam

Gauthamante Radham (transl. Gautham's Chariot) is a 2020 Indian Malayalam-language comedy-drama film written and directed by Anand Menen. The film stars Neeraj Madhav, Valsala Menon, Punya Elizabeth Bose, Renji Panicker and Hareesh Kanaran. Neeraj Madhav plays the main role named as Gauthaman, a young man who is highly interested in driving.

== Plot ==
Gouthamante radham narrates his story of learning driving and how he handled the difficulties that came across his life.

The movie starts with young Gauthaman rotating the wheel of a bicycle as he is very much interested in vehicles. Gauthaman's grandmother whom he lovingly calls Muthassi saw him most of the time spending with the toy cars and his father's cycle. Gauthaman's father Ramachandran is a very kind and compassionate person who is ready to fulfil all the wishes of his son. But Muthassi is the only one who encourages Gauthaman to take initiative to drive vehicles. As a result, his confidence level raise. They move from their village to Cochin City.

Years passed. On Gauthaman's 18th birthday, he spends most of the time arguing with his grandmother on simple issues but both share a strong bond. Muthassi took classes for neighbouring children based on stories from the Puranas (Sanatana Dharma). Gauthaman is always against her old beliefs. Ramachandran compels him to take a driving license and hearing this Gauthaman gets excited at the top level as it was his dream for years. Shibu Ashaan is assigned to teach him driving. He is a strict as well as a funny teacher. Gauthaman finds a great personality on him on the first day of learning. Gauthaman drives well as a result without any issues. But one time hits a car while taking reverse. However his determination and courage resulted him a driving license. His family is extremely happy and his father decides to buy a car as he feels his cycle cannot always fulfil their family needs. Gauthaman selected Mitsubishi Lancer and his family agrees to it. Muthassi gives Gauthaman some money in advance.

Gauthaman is now waiting anxiously for a car to arrive in his house. However, on the day the car arrived, Gauthaman was as expected not happy, but instead gloomy as he got a Tata Nano and not the one he selected. He argues with the whole family to take back the car. But Ramachandran consoles him that Shibu Ashaan suggested the small car. Gauthaman came to know that Shibu Ashaan cheated him forgetting the credit he gave his teacher in the day of getting license. Muthassi takes care of the vehicle and names it 'Nanappan'. However Gauthaman is still not satisfied. His family shows the pride of it in the society. All plans to go for a long ride on Kunjoottan after spoiling his personal activities. Gauthaman's relatives tease him of buying a small low rated car. Gauthaman is angry on his family now. Soon, Gauthaman and his friends take the car to Munnar where they decide to trash and destroy it. However, this changes as Gauthaman tells them to stop. Once he returns home the next day, his father asks him to run a small errand. In the process of it, a biker Kalyani breaks the mirror. Venki gets mad and they crash the car into her. Kalyani complains to the police and they decide to compromise. Gauthaman has to deal with Kalyani's hospital expenses. One day Gauthaman's neighbor falls fits and Gauthaman uses his small car to take him to the hospital on time. Kalyani gets angry on Gauthaman as he did not pick her call but on knowing the truth she falls for him. They both fall in love and Gauthaman's family accepts the relationship but Kalyani's father rejects him because he has no job yet.

After this incident Gautham and Kalyani decide to break up their relationship. While discussing this thing with his friends, Venki reveals that he has been forced to go to gulf for work. Finally Gautham decides to take his grandmother to Rameswaram to fulfil her last wish and she dies in her car. After some time Venki departed Gautham and flies to Gulf. Gautham finally receives a letter offering a job and decides to sell Nanappan. The family then have a sad farewell to Nanappan. After some time Gautham has a job with a salary of ₹ 80000. He brings back Nanappan and Goes to Kalyani house and takes her from the house with her permission and they lived happily ever after

== Cast ==
- Neeraj Madhav as Gauthaman
  - Vasudev Sajeesh Marar as 10 year old Gautaman
  - Suryadev Sajeesh Marar as 6 year old Gautaman
- Valsala Menon as Muthassi
- Punya Elizabeth Bose as Kalyani, Gautaman's love interest
- Renji Panicker as Ramachandran
- Devi Ajith as Sreelekha
- Hareesh Kanaran as Basheer
- Biju Sopanam as Shibu Ashan
- Basil Joseph as Venkidi Iyer
- Nadiya as Nimmy
- Krishnandhu as Kichu
- Anand Menon as Nimmy's Boyfriend
- Vishnu Govindan as Sambath Annan
- Hareesh Pengan as Anirudhan
- Kalabhavan Prajod as Dhuthu Francis
- Liji Sivaprakash as Venkidi's Mother

== Soundtrack ==
Gauthamante Radham

Soundtrack album by Ankit Menon and O. B. Anuraj
- Released: January 28, 2020
- Genre: Film soundtrack
- Length: 24:23 minutes
- Label: Muzik247

Track	Song	Lyricist	Composer	Singer(s)
1	"Theythaka Thaaram"	O. B. Anuraj	O. B. Anuraj	Sooraj Santhosh
2	"Moham Ennorunthuvandi"	Vinayak Sasikumar	Ankit Menon	Gowry Lekshmi
3	"Uyire"	Vinayak Sasikumar	Ankit Menon	Sid Sriram
4	"Theeraa Kadha"	Vinayak Sasikumar	Ankit Menon	Ankit Menon, Preetha Madhu Menon, Ashwin Aryan
5	"Bang Bang"	Vinayak Sasikumar	Ankit Menon	Neeraj Madhav, Sayanora Philip
6	"Ud Chala"	Sushant Sudhakaran	Ankit Menon	Ankit Menon
7	"Uyire"	Vinayak Sasikumar	Ankit Menon	Ankit Menon

== Reception ==
Deepika Jayaram of The Times of India rated the film 2.5/5 stars and wrote, "Though it is an earnest effort, based on the significance of fostering values, a more heart-warming storyline could have given a few more good moments of takeaway." Nikhil of Onmanorama wrote, "Gauthamante Radham is a small movie that doesn’t have a complex story line or major plot twists. [...] This is a perfect family entertainer that gives prominence to not just the hero and the heroine but their families and friends as well."
