= Padakkalam =

2025 Indian film by Manu Swaraj

- Theatrical release poster
- Directed by: Manu Swaraj
- Written by: Manu Swaraj; Nithin C Babu
- Produced by: Vijay Babu; Vijay Subramaniam
- Starring: Suraj Venjaramoodu; Sharaf U Dheen; Sandeep Pradeep
- Cinematography: Anu Moothedath
- Edited by: Nidhin Raj Arol
- Music by: Rajesh Murugesan
- Production companies: Friday Film House; 29SeptemberWorks; KRG Studios
- Release date: 8 May 2025
- Running time: 123 minutes
- Country: India
- Language: Malayalam
- Box office: ₹17 crore

Padakkalam (transl. Battlefield) is a 2025 Indian Malayalam-language comedy fantasy film written and directed by Manu Swaraj, starring Suraj Venjaramoodu, Sharaf U Dheen and Sandeep Pradeep.

Padakkalam was released in theatres on 8 May 2025. The film became a commercial success at box office.

== Plot ==
Jithin, Ramzad, Nakul, and Kannan are four students pursuing their bachelor's degrees at Shri Kartika Thirunal College of Engineering. Before one of Prof. Shaji's classes, Jithin's girlfriend Jeevika confronts him about their relationship, prompting Jithin to write down his feelings on a piece of paper. The class is suddenly interrupted by a student strike questioning the credentials of the current Head of Department (HoD). In the confusion, Prof. Shaji unknowingly takes Jithin's note with him to the staff room.

Prof. Renjith, a popular and charismatic faculty member, intervenes in the strike and publicly supports the idea of appointing Shaji as the new HoD. However, Renjith secretly possesses an ancient artifact, which he uses to control Shaji and manipulate him into getting into a public altercation. This leads to Shaji losing his candidacy, and Renjith becoming the new HoD.

Jithin accidentally witnesses Renjith using the artifact while trying to find the note Shaji took, and reveals the truth to his friends. While researching about the artifact, they learn that a person can control anyone using it, just by applying their opponent's blood to the dice used for the game. They hatch a plan to steal the artifact to stop Renjith. The boys successfully steal the artifact, but Renjith discovers the theft. As revenge, he begins to possess Jithin, whose blood was accidentally left on a die which Renjith recovered. Renjith begins to torment him, ruining his reputation as well as his studies. Kannan learns that the only way to free Jithin from Renjith's possession is to complete a game using the artifact, which requires a special lock currently in Renjith's possession.

The group attempts to 3D-print the lock in their college's CAD lab, but the printed version fails to open the artifact. Ramzad attempts to retrieve the original locket but fails, as Shaji gets to it first, but he ends up convincing Shaji to team up against Renjith. Jithin and Shaji begin playing the game, but Renjith interrupts them. In the chaos that follows, a three-way body swap occurs between Jithin, Shaji, and Renjith. Jithin ends up in Shaji's body, Shaji ends up in Renjith's body and Renjith ends up in Jithin's body.

It is revealed that Renjith, while trying to possess Jithin, had also been unknowingly controlling Shaji's body as well and gets him into trouble, which leads to his wife Shobha leaving him, pushing him into a suicidal state. However, after the body swap, Shaji begins to enjoy Renjith's life and refuses to return the dice needed to reverse the body swap. Meanwhile, Renjith (in Jithin's body) continuously gets Jithin into trouble as a form of blackmail. Jithin (in Shaji's body) discovers that drinking alcohol affects Shaji (now in Renjith's body), giving them a small leverage. Things take a turn when Shobha, unaware of the body swap, reveals her pregnancy to Jithin (in Shaji's body). This emotional revelation causes a change of heart in Shaji, who agrees to end the game. But Jithin learns that Renjith has a medical condition with low count on RBC that could be fatal, and that he intends to stay in Jithin's body. This leads to an altercation as Jithin and Shaji try to finish the game while Renjith tries to stop them. Shaji subdues Renjith by drinking alcohol, which affects Renjith (in Jithin's body), and allows Jithin to escape with the artifact. He and Shaji then try to finish the game, but Renjith tries to once again stop them. Jithin manages to finish the game, returning everyone to their own bodies, and Shaji (in Renjith's body) jumps out of a high window at the last moment to ensure Renjith is stopped once and for all.

Jithin, now with a better life view, talks to Jeevika and they amicably part ways, while Shaji reconciles with Shobha and his unborn child. Renjith is left injured and unconscious due to the fall and the doctor reveals it is unclear when or whether he will wake up. The boys destroy the artifact and finally return to their normal college life after an adventure of a lifetime. During the credits, the doctor suddenly calls the boys and tells them that Renjith has gone missing from the hospital.

== Cast ==
- Suraj Venjaramoodu as Professor Shaji KK/Jithin(After Body Swap)
- Sharaf U Dheen as Professor Renjith/Professor Shaji KK(After Body Swap)
- Sandeep Pradeep as Jithin, ECE student/Professor Renjith(After Body Swap)
- Saaf as Kannan, Jithin's friend
- Arun Ajikumar as Nakul, Jithin's friend
- Arun Pradeep as Ramzad, Jithin's friend
- Niranjana Anoop as Jeevika, Jithin's love interest
- Pooja Mohanraj as Shobha, Shaji's wife
- Ishan Shoukath as Lijo, Jithin's rival
- Shaju Sreedhar as Professor
- Luckgith Saini as Praveen
- Nahas Hidhayath as Shaji's brother in law
- Vijay Babu as Doctor
- Indrajith Sukumaran as Narrator

== Release ==
=== Theatrical ===
Padakkalam released theatrically in India on 8 May

It released in Oman and Bahrain on 15 May 2025. It was also released in the United Kingdom and Ireland on 23 May 2025.

=== Home media ===
The film began streaming on JioHotstar from 10 June 2025. The satellite rights of the film is acquired by Asianet and will premiere on 4 September 2025 on the occasion of Onam.

== Reception ==
=== Critical response ===
Latha Srinivasan of Hindustan Times rated 2/5 stars and wrote "Padakkalam is a decent attempt by director Manu Swaraj to give the audiences a clean campus supernatural fantasy comedy but it is the poor writing that lets down the film." Anandu Suresh of The Indian Express rated 1.5/5 stars and wrote "Despite having a fascinating plot, the Suraj Venjaramoodu and Sharaf U Dheen-starrer is let down completely by aimless writing." Vishal Menon of The Hollywood Reporter India wrote "'Padakkalam' takes a few outrageous steps to give us a plot that goes beyond the basic setup-payoff pattern of most body-swap comedies."
