= Mudhugauv =

- Theatrical release poster
- Directed by: Vipin Das
- Written by: Vipin Das
- Produced by: Vijay Babu; Sandra Thomas
- Starring: Gokul Suresh; Arthana; Vijay Babu; Soubin Shahir; Hareesh Perumanna; Baiju; Indrans; Prem Kumar
- Narrated by: Dulquer Salmaan
- Cinematography: Kugan S. Palani
- Edited by: Lijo Paul
- Music by: Rahul Raj
- Production companies: Friday Film House; Carnival Motion Pictures
- Distributed by: Carnival Motion Pictures
- Release date: 13 May 2016
- Running time: 121 minutes
- Country: India
- Language: Malayalam

Mudhugauv (transl. Kiss) is a 2016 Malayalam-language caper-comedy film written and directed by Vipin Das (in his directional debut). It is produced by Vijay Babu and Sandra Thomas under the banner, Friday Film House. It marks the acting debut of Gokul Suresh, son of Malayalam actor Suresh Gopi, and Arthana, daughter of Malayalam actor Vijayakumar. It also stars Vijay Babu, Baiju, Indrans, Soubin Shahir, Hareesh Perumanna, and Disney James along with Prem Kumar, Abu Salim, Sunil Sukhada, Anil Murali, Sharu, and Anand in supporting roles. The film's title is derived from the popular catchphrase from the 1994 cult classic Thenmavin Kombath. The original score and songs are composed, arranged, and produced by Rahul Raj.

== Plot ==
In 1994, a businessman is shown to be betrayed and murdered by his friend Ramakrishnan Bonacaud, who then goes on to call himself Rambo after the iconic character.

Back in present 2016, the story shifts to Bharath, a technical student, has a habit of kissing people nearby when he is stressed and happy, disregarding social situations. He even gets into trouble after kissing a matronly lady external examiner when he is told to relieve his stress during a viva-voce. He, from his first sight of Ganga, falls in love with her and tries wooing her, even managing to plant a kiss on her nape in the pretext of a friendly hug. Somewhere in Trivandrum city, Rambo, who has now grown into an infamous gangster, has a face-to-face confrontation with CI Padmanabhan alias Padayappa. Grumpy Rambo becomes annoyed and plans to kill Padayappa soon before leaving Kerala.

Meanwhile, Bharath is able to requite love from Ganga. Rambo sketches Padayappa through two bumbling goons Kumari and Putheri, but the moment he is about to shoot Padayappa on the road is exactly when Bharath, walking along, gets confirmation on love from Ganga sitting in a passing bus. An ecstatic Bharath, looking for someone to kiss, chances upon none other than Rambo pulling his suppressed gun, and the unexpected action fumbles Rambo who ends up shooting his own crotch. Rambo, who after the accident has urinary incontinence due to the bullet rupturing his urinary bladder and is attached to a urine drainage bag permanently, is enraged and asks his gang to round up everyone involved. The gang has a hard time doing this, as no one knows any whereabout s of the random passerby who came up and kissed Rambo, and all sorts of random dudes are brought up to kiss Rambo as an identification test. All this while the police plan to trap Rambo once and for all, understanding him to be not just a business man but a don. Meanwhile, Bharath happens to stay with Ganga in her bedroom at her own home one night, during which they kiss but then fall asleep. After this incident, Ganga starts to react paranoid assuming they had sex, suspecting she is pregnant with Bharath's child, and preoccupiedly behaves in the gravity of the same.

Padayappa's father-in-law ends up hostage with Rambo's team, and the police then set up a meeting with Rambo through Kumari and Putheri on Rambo's hotel terrace. Rambo calls Bharath's number (which Putheri has obtained) and it keeps ringing. Unexpectedly, Bharath comes to the hotel's terrace to discuss with Ganga their problem of confirming whether she is pregnant through a pregnancy test kit and switches off his phone. Everyone on the terrace is frozen and unsure of how to respond. Knowing Ganga isn't pregnant, Bharath looks to kiss someone, sees Rambo and runs towards him to kiss; they both fall. Immediately, a shootout starts between the Police and Rambo's gang. Bharath and Ganga escape through the staircase. Rambo follows and corners them near a balcony. Padayappa fires his gun; which distracts Rambo, he slips on his urine from his detached catheter and falls from the balcony to the sea. Police round up Rambo's gang and try to find Rambo's body but are unable to find it. The policemen involved are promised promotions from political leaders. Bharath, back at home after legal proceedings, promises (at his mother's insistence) before his late father's photo to not kiss anyone whom he doesn't know. It is revealed that his father, Chandran, happens to be the same man whom Rambo was shown murdering in his early days at the beginning of the film.

In the credits, it is shown that Rambo is washed up on a beach and a couple of cannibals are surrounding him. The scene cuts to blank as Rambo awakens right in time to see one of their women about to kiss him.

== Cast ==
- Gokul Suresh as Bharath Chandran
- Arthana as Ganga, Bharath's love interest
- Vijay Babu as Ramakrishnan Bonacaud (Rambo), a notorious Gangster
- Soubin Shahir as Gun Alexander aka Kumari
- Hareesh Perumanna as Murugan Putheri
- Baiju as CI Padmanabhan aka Padayappa
- Abu Salim as Please, Rambo's right-hand man
- Arun Kumar as Tony
- Sharu Varghese as Nova, Rambo's right-hand woman
- Indrans as Jayarajan, Padmanabhan's alcoholic uncle
- Prem Kumar as Chief Minister Thomman Chacko
- Subhash Nair as Sub Inspector Manoj
- Santhosh Keezhattoor as Chandran, Bharath's father (cameo)
- Neena Kurup as Lakshmi, Bharath's mother
- Aparna P Nair as nurse (cameo)
- Sunil Sukhada as Sunil Shah, a Marwadi moneylender
- Disney James as Disney the carjacker
- Devi Ajith as external examiner (cameo)
- Tony Alex Valluvassery
- Aju Varghese as Bruno (cameo)
- Anil Murali as Thampi
- Pradeep Kottayam as doctor
- Anand Kumar as Commissioner
- KPAC Leelamani as vegetable seller
- Vineeth Mohan as Koshy (cameo)
- Vaisakh Velayudhan as Bharath's friend
- Dhyan Sreenivasan as tribal gang member (Cameo)
- Aswin Jose as a youngster kidnapped by Rambo (uncredited role)

== Music ==
All the songs are composed, arranged, and programmed by Rahul Raj. The official soundtrack which contains three original songs and one violin reprise was met with positive reviews upon release. Rahul Raj's background score, which includes an unreleased remix version of "Rambo", too received unanimous praise in the film's reviews.

=== Track listing ===
No.	Title	Performer(s)	Length
1.	"Halli Sreehalli"	Chinmayi, Rahul Raj
2.	"Rambo"	Vijay Yesudas
3.	"Thoominnal"	Haricharan
4.	"Rambo (Violin Reprise)"	Instrumental
