= Basil Joseph =

Indian film director and actor

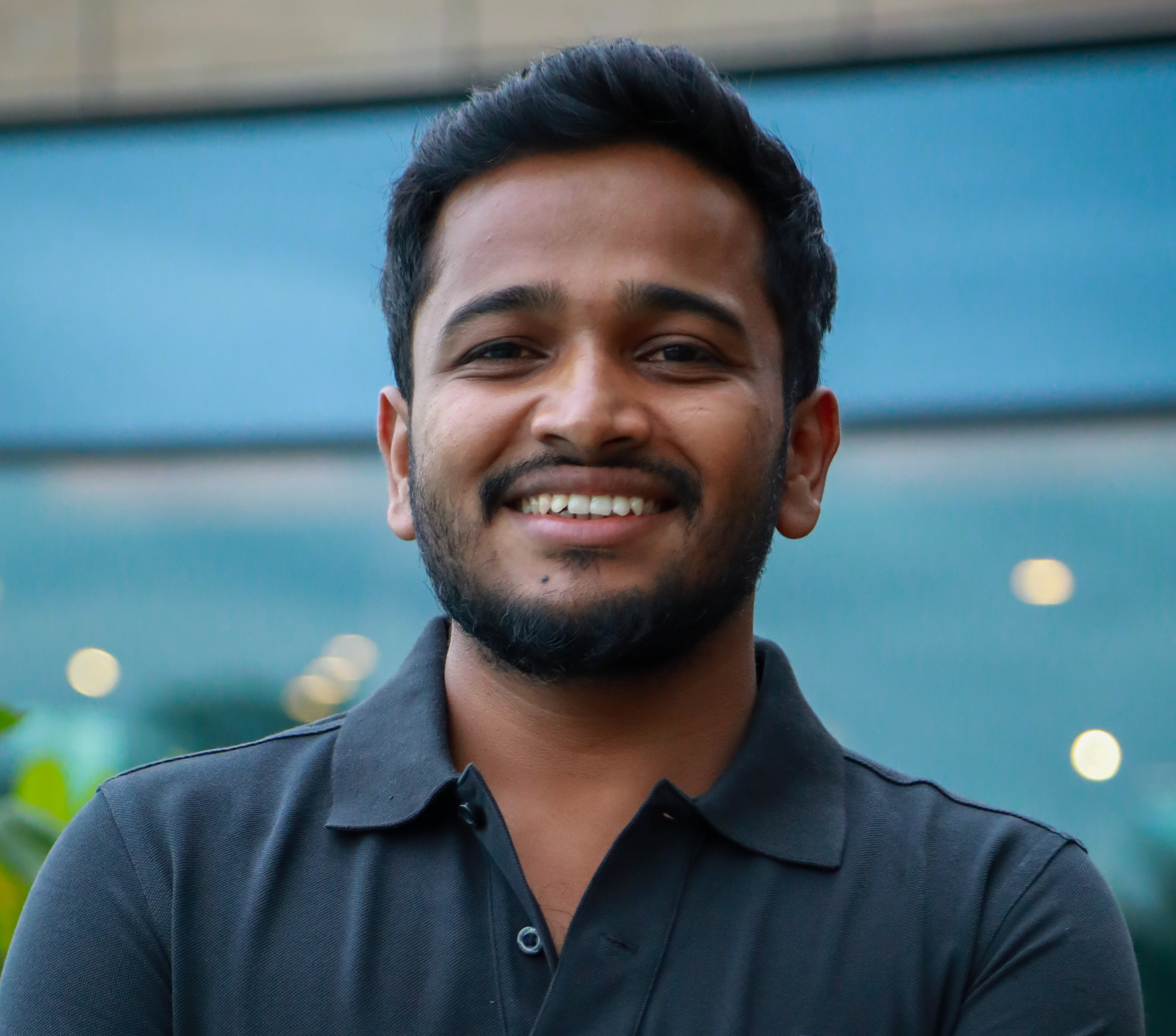
- Basil in 2023
- Born: Sulthan Bathery, Wayanad district, Kerala
- Education: College of Engineering, Thiruvananthapuram (B.Tech.)
- Occupations: Actor; Director; Producer
- Years active: 2013–present
- Spouse: Elizabeth Samuel (m. 2017)
- Children: 1

Basil Joseph is an Indian film actor and director who works in the Malayalam film industry. He started his film career as an assistant director of Vineeth Sreenivasan in the 2013 film Thira. He has directed three films till date, Kunjiramayanam (2015), Godha (2017) and Minnal Murali (2021).

Basil made his acting debut in the 2013 film Up & Down: Mukalil Oralundu. Basil has played supporting roles in numerous Malayalam films and is well appreciated for his role in Joji (2021). He has since received praise for his lead roles in films such as Jan. E. Man (2021), Jaya Jaya Jaya Jaya Hey (2022), Palthu Janwar (2022), Falimy (2023), Nunakkuzhi (2024), Sookshmadarshini (2024), and Ponman (2025).

== Early life ==
Basil Joseph was born at Sultan Bathery in the Wayanad district of Kerala. He is the son of Fr. Joseph Pallippatt, a Jacobite priest. He studied at St. Joseph's School, Sulthan Bathery, and at SKMJ Higher Secondary School in Kalpetta. He then did his B.Tech. degree from the College of Engineering, Trivandrum. He worked at Infosys in Technopark, Trivandrum for two years before starting his career in movies.

== Career ==
Basil Joseph acted in the short film CET Life whilst attending College of Engineering, Trivandrum. He also scripted and directed the short films, Oru Thundu Padam and Priyamvadha Katharayano during his stint at Infosys as a systems engineer in Thiruvananthapuram.

Basil assisted Vineeth Sreenivasan in his third directional venture, Thira in 2013. He made his directorial debut in 2015 with Kunjiramayanam which featured brothers Vineeth Sreenivasan and Dhyan Sreenivasan. His second directorial venture was the sports comedy Godha starring Tovino Thomas. The film was a commercial success and went on to become the highest-grossing film of Tovino Thomas during that period. His third film Minnal Murali starring Tovino Thomas was released on Netflix in 2021 and had a simultaneous release in Malayalam, Tamil, Telugu, Kannada and Hindi.

== Personal life ==
On 17 August 2017, he married Elizabeth, with whom he was in a relationship for over seven years. They have one daughter.

== Filmography ==
Key
†	Denotes films that have not yet been released

=== As director ===
Year	Title	Writer	Notes	Ref.
2015	Kunjiramayanam	Deepu Pradeep	Debut film	
2017	Godha	Rakesh Mantodi		
2021	Minnal Murali	Arun Anirudhan, Justin Mathew	Netflix film	

==== As assistant director ====
- Thira (2013)

=== As actor ===
Year	Title	Role	Notes	Ref.
2013	Up & Down: Mukalil Oralundu	Lift Technician		
2013	Silence	John		
2014	Homely Meals	Editor Basil		
2015	Kunjiramayanam	Vellakkundil Dinesan		
2017	Mayanadhi	Director Jinu	Cameo appearance	
2017	Godha	Villager		
2018	Rosapoo	Bhanu		
2018	Padayottam	Pinku		
2018	Nithyaharitha Nayakan	Joby		
2019	Virus	Dr. Mithun		
2019	Kakshi: Amminippilla	Adv. Pilakul Shamsu		
2019	Love Action Drama	DJ Brijesh		
2019	Ormayil Oru Shishiram	Sanju		
2019	Manoharam	Prabhu		
2019	Kettyolannu Ente Malakha	Kunjaambi		
2019	Mariyam Vannu Vilakkoothi	Pizza Delivery Boy		
2020	Gauthamante Radham	Venkidi Iyer		
2020	Kilometers and Kilometers	Kuttan		
2021	Joji	Fr. Kevin		
2021	Aanum Pennum	Thug Sabu		
2021	Jan.E.Man	Joymon		
2021	Minnal Murali	Young Politician	Special appearance	
2022	Dear Friend	Sajith		
2022	Nna Thaan Case Kodu	Judge	Special appearance	
2022	Palthu Janwar	Prasoon Krishnakumar		
2022	Jack and Jill	Ravi		
2022	Ullasam	Asi		
2022	Jaya Jaya Jaya Jaya Hey	Rajesh		
2022	No Way Out			
2022	Mukundan Unni Associates	Himself	Voiceover	
2023	Enkilum Chandrike	Kiran		
2023	Pookkaalam	Advocate Jikkumon		
2023	Kadina Kadoramee Andakadaham	Bashiruddeen (Bachu)		
2023	Falimy	Anoop Chandran		
2024	Varshangalkku Shesham	Pradeep		
2024	Guruvayoor Ambalanadayil	Kaitholapparambil Vinu Ramachandran		
2024	Nunakkuzhi	Eby Zachariah Poozhikunnel		
2024	Vaazha: Biopic of a Billion Boys	Police officer	Cameo appearance	
2024	Ajayante Randam Moshanam	K.P. Suresh		
2024	Cup	Raneesh		
2024	Sookshmadarshini	Manuel		
2025	Pravinkoodu Shappu	SI Santhosh C J		
2025	Ponman	PP Ajesh		
2025	Maranamass	Luke P P		
2025	Hridayapoorvam	Dr. Manu Rameshan	Cameo appearance	
2025	Madhuram Jeevamrutha Bindu	Ilyas	Anthology film	
2026	Parasakthi	Major Oomen Chacko	Tamil film; Cameo appearance	
2026	Athiradi	Samkutty	Also producer	
2026	Mollywood Times	Superstar Swaroop	Cameo appearance	

=== Short films ===
Year	Title	Role	Language	Director	Notes	Ref.
2012	CET Life	Actor	Malayalam	Arun & Sarath		
2012	Shhh...	Script writer	Malayalam	Basil Joseph		
2012	Priyamvadha Katharayano	Actor	Malayalam	Basil Joseph		
2013	Pakalukalude Rani	Actor	Malayalam	Ritwik Baiju		
2013	Oru Thundu Padam	Writer	Malayalam	Basil Joseph		
2014	Happy Onam	Writer	Malayalam	Basil Joseph		

== Awards and nominations ==
Year	Award	Category	Film	Result	Ref.
2019	SIIMA Award	Best Actor in a Comedy Role (Malayalam)	Kettyolaanu Ente Malakha	Won	
2022	Mazhavil Manorama Entertainment Award	Special Mention	Minnal Murali	Won	
2022	SIIMA Award	Best Director (Malayalam)	Minnal Murali	Nominated	
2022	Asian Academy Creative Awards	Best Director (Fiction)	Minnal Murali	Won	
2023	SIIMA Award	Special Jury Appreciation	Jaya Jaya Jaya Jaya Hey	Won	
2024	Mazhavil Entertainment Awards	The Entertainer of the Year (Special Mention)	Falimy, Guruvayoor Ambalanadayil, Varshangalkku Shesham	Won	
