= Falimy =

2023 Malayalam film by Nithish Sahadev

- Theatrical release poster
- Directed by: Nithish Sahadev
- Screenplay by: Nithish Sahadev; Sanjo Joseph
- Story by: Nithish Sahadev
- Produced by: Lakshmi Warrier; Ganesh Menon; Amal Paulson; Ramshi ahamed
- Starring: Basil Joseph; Jagadish; Sandeep Pradeep; Manju Pillai
- Cinematography: Bablu Aju
- Edited by: Nidhin Raj Arol
- Music by: Vishnu Vijay
- Production companies: Cheers Entertainments; Sooper Dooper Films
- Distributed by: Icon Cinemas
- Release date: 17 November 2023
- Running time: 127 minutes
- Country: India
- Language: Malayalam

Falimy (Note: The title is a play on the word family and alludes to the film's dysfunctional family.) is a 2023 Indian Malayalam-language comedy-drama film co-written and directed by Nithish Sahadev in his directorial debut. The film stars Basil Joseph, Jagadish, Sandeep Pradeep and Manju Pillai. It narrates the journey of a dysfunctional middle-class family to Varanasi and the realisations they gain from it.

The film was officially announced in December 2019. Principal photography began in November 2022 and was wrapped up in May 2023. The music was composed by Vishnu Vijay, while Bablu Aju and Nidhin Raj Arol handled the cinematography and editing.

Falimy was released in theatres on 10 November 2023 during Diwali week and received positive reviews from critics and was a commercial success at box office.

== Plot ==
Anoop is a dubbing artist who lives in Thiruvananthapuram with his father Chandran, mother Rema, younger brother Abhijith and grandfather Janardhanan. Chandran, who is an unemployed person, earlier owned a printing press but now spends his days watching TV and drinking with his friend Chacko. Rema works in a digital press and Abhijith intends to migrate to the United Kingdom for his higher studies. Janardhanan wishes to visit Varanasi and is caught by his family members whenever he attempts to go alone. Anoop and Chandran are in a feud and communicate only through insults.

Anoop's family arranges a marriage proposal for him with Anagha, a teacher. On their engagement day, the marriage proposal is called off when Robin, a guy who used to stalk Anagha, disrupts the ceremony. Abhijith trashes Robin and Chandran makes a complaint at the police station. After the incident, the engagement is called off and Anoop takes a two-week leave and decides to take Janardhanan to Varanasi. As Robin's friends are after him, Abhijith decides to accompany Anoop. Chandran, who is having issues with Anoop and initially showed no interest, later decides to join the journey and Rema also joins them.

On the way to Varanasi, Chandran is tricked by a tea-selling boy at a railway station and Rema, Anoop and Abhijith get off the train. The station master helps them get off Janardhanan and the luggage at Tikaria Railway Station. The next day, they reach the railway station in Tikaria and take Janardhanan with them. They catch a bus heading for Varanasi and get off in a remote place when Rema begins vomiting.

Pappu Panday, an animal trafficker, offers them a ride and on the way at a checkpoint, a police officer asks him for the vehicle's documents. Pappu Panday escapes by breaking the checkpoint and leaves Chandran and his family in a desolate place. They somehow reach a bus stop from where they are able to take another bus to Varanasi. They get a call from Chacko that their aged neighbour, who was a friend of Janardhanan's, died and Janardhanan is heartbroken. They manage to reach Varanasi at night and take a room in a lodge.

The next morning, they learn from the receptionist that Janardhanan left with a group of monks at midnight. While searching for Janardhanan, Chandran, Rema, Anoop and Abhijith are taken to the police station by the police officer who was at the checkpoint. Rema shows their family photo when SI Sakshi Yadav asks them for ID proof. A public announcement is made by Anoop about Janardhanan's missing case in Malayalam. Pramod, a Malayali settled in Varanasi who is familiar with Anoop's voice, meets them and assures to help find Janardhanan. They spend many days in the city trying to find Janardhanan and meanwhile, Anoop and Chandran slowly restore their relationship. Anoop later learns from two people that Janardhanan is dead and that his body was cremated on the banks of the Ganges. Chandran performs Janardhanan's death rituals. In between the rituals, Chacko calls Anoop to inform that Janardhanan is back home at Thiruvananthapuram and is upset about his friend's death.

When Chandran and his family return home, they learn from their neighbour that Janardhanan has departed for the railway station with his friend's cremains. They meet Janardhanan on the train, and the whole family happily reconcile, deciding to join Janardhanan on his journey to Varanasi. However, the ticket checker kicks Chandran, Rema, Anoop and Abhijith off the train as they are travelling without tickets and they decide to let Janardhanan continue the journey alone, believing he is the most sensible among them.

== Cast ==
- Basil Joseph as Anoop Chandran "Anu"
- Jagadish as Chandran
- Sandeep Pradeep as Abhijith Chandran "Abhi"
- Manju Pillai as Rema Chandran
- Abhiram Radhakrishnan as Pramod
- Boloram Das as Pappu Panday
- Meenaraj Palluruthy as Janardhanan
- Raina Radhakrishnan as Anagha
- Amith Mohan Rajeshwari as Kichu
- Joemon Jyothir as Robin
- Anilraj Thiruvananthapuram as Chacko
- Kuttappan as Ravindran
- Arunsol as Ravindran's son
- Aryan Kathuria as Dev

== Production ==
In December 2019, it was announced that Antony Varghese would be playing the lead role in the film, with Jude Anthany Joseph and Aravind Kurup as producers. Later, Antony Varghese withdrew from the project, and Basil Joseph came in to play the lead role. The production studio was replaced with Cheers Entertainments. Falimy marks the third collaboration of Basil Joseph with Cheers Entertainments, following Jaya Jaya Jaya Jaya Hey (2022) and Jan. E. Man (2021). Principal photography began on 5 November 2022 and was wrapped up on 6 May 2023. The film was shot in Thiruvananthapuram, Chamarajanagar, Rajasthan and Varanasi.

== Music ==
The film has music composed by Vishnu Vijay. The first single titled "Manjeera Shinjitham," written by Muhsin Parari and sung by Vishnu Vijay and Anthony Daasan, was released on 21 October 2023. The second song "Mazhavillile" was released on 15 November 2023, sung by Vishnu Vijay and written by Muhsin Parari.

== Release ==
Falimy was released in theatres on 17 November 2023. Disney+ Hotstar acquired the digital rights and initially scheduled to start streaming on 15 December 2023. The release date was later postponed and the film began streaming on the platform on 18 December 2023 in Malayalam, Tamil, Kannada, Telugu, and Hindi.

== Reception ==
=== Critical response ===
Falimy received positive reviews from critics.

Subhash K. Jha of Times Now gave 4 out of 5 stars and wrote, "There's the drama of the dysfunctional family; quite the cliché in Hindi and Malayalam cinema. Then there is the 'Dis' functional family in Falimy, always dissing one another irrespective of who gets hurt." Cris of The News Minute gave 4 out of 5 stars and wrote, "Performances of the newer actors are as raw as the experienced Jagadish and the easily-funny Basil." Gopika Is of The Times of India gave 3.5 out of 5 stars and wrote, "Basil Joseph starrer Falimy turned out to be a pleasant surprise with an apt picturisation of middle-class life with a touch of natural humour."

Vignesh Madhu of The New Indian Express gave 3.5 out of 5 stars and wrote, "Despite Falimy's subject having the potential for a lot of emotionally charged drama, Nithish opts for a light-hearted approach relying more on fun moments." Sanjith Sidhardhan of OTTPlay gave 3 out of 5 stars and wrote, "Falimy works mostly because of its humour - derived from relatable situations in middle-class households - where a journey with a family isn't often a priority for everyone who is part of the trip." Snigdha Nalini Oreya of Outlook gave 3 out of 5 stars and wrote, "Falimy has its moments of comedy and emotion, but it is not something that has not been done before. The underlying emotion with which the characters take certain steps is something that we might all be familiar with."

Anandu Suresh of The Indian Express gave 2 out of 5 stars and wrote, "Despite having the potential to be significantly better, Falimy falls short of hitting top gear due to unimpressive writing." S. R. Praveen of The Hindu wrote, "In getting the mix between humour and emotion right, Nithish Sahadev's debut directorial elevates itself above the average comedy-drama and turns into a heartwarming tale." Swathi P. Ajith of Onmanorama wrote, "The movie's strength lies in its simplicity; it avoids being overly ambitious. It maintains a straightforward storyline with compelling characters, and the actors seamlessly bring their roles to life, adding to the film's overall strength."

== Accolades ==
Award	Category	Recipient	Result	Ref.
12th South Indian International Movie Awards	Best Actor	Basil Joseph	Nominated	
12th South Indian International Movie Awards	Best Actor in a Supporting Role	Jagadish	Nominated	
12th South Indian International Movie Awards	Best Actress in a Supporting Role	Manju Pillai	Won	
12th South Indian International Movie Awards	Best Comedian	Sandeep Pradeep	Nominated	
