= Azees Nedumangad =

Indian actor

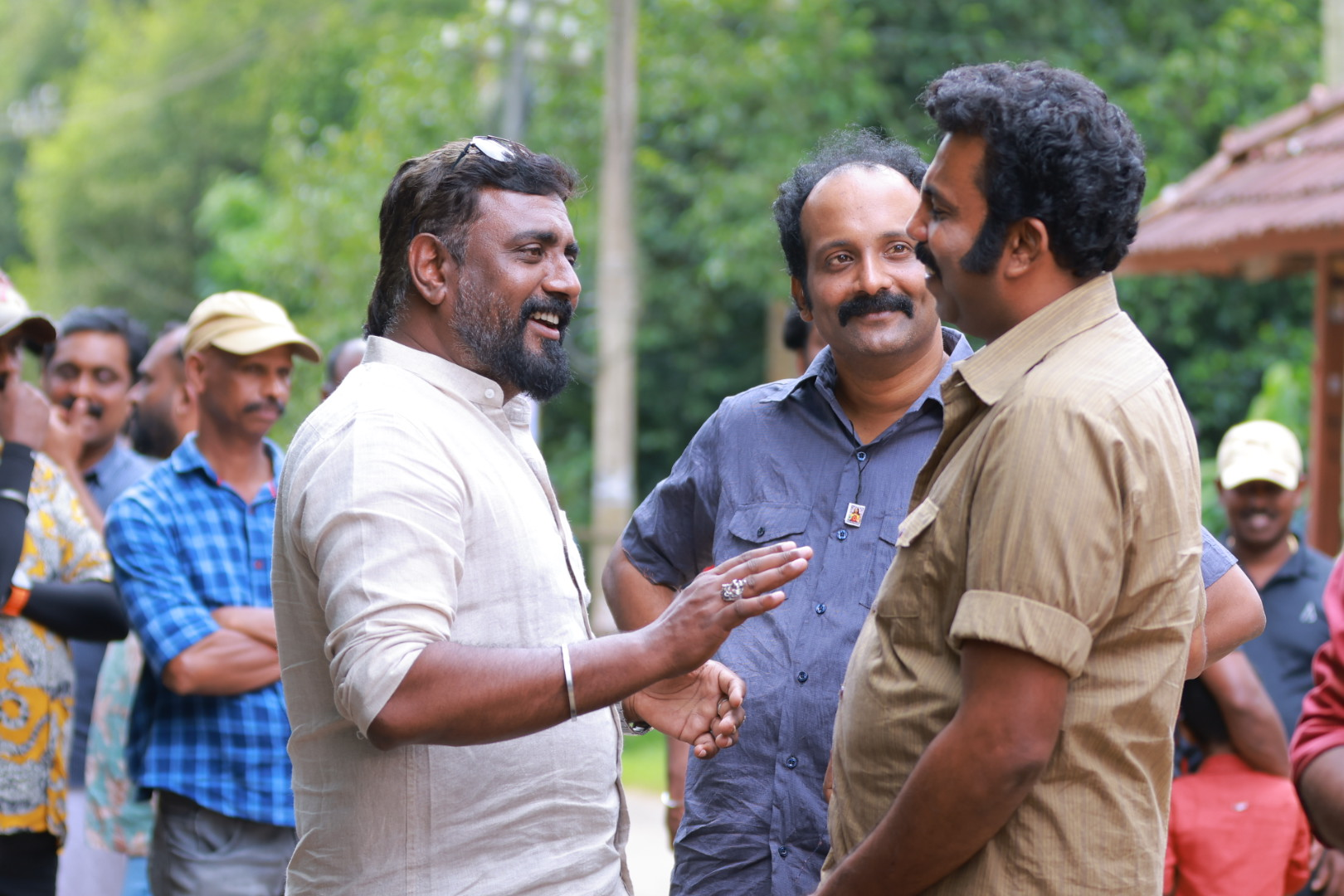
- Born: Azees Haneefa; Nedumangad, Kerala, India
- Occupations: Actor; comedian
- Years active: 2012–present

Azees Haneefa, professionally known as Azees Nedumangad, is an Indian actor and comedian who works in the Malayalam film industry. He is known for his roles in the films Action Hero Biju (2016), CBI 5: The Brain (2021), Minnal Murali (2021), Jaya Jaya Jaya Jaya Hey (2022), and Kannur Squad (2023).

== Filmography ==
Key
†	Denotes films that have not yet been released

Year	Title	Role	Notes
2012	Kunjaliyan	Member	
2012	Thalsamayam Oru Penkutty	Man at Ayyappan's shop	
2013	Rebecca Uthup Kizhakkemala	Tomichan	
2013	Kaanchi	Lottery Suku	
2014	Monayi Angane Aanayi	Sarangadharan	
2016	Action Hero Biju	Card Player	
2016	Aakashvani	Pester	
2016	Angane Thanne Nethave Anjettennam Pinnale	Kakka Madhu	
2017	Aby	Benny	
2018	Parole	Kottaram Vasu	
2018	Premasoothram	Toddy Tapper	
2018	Johny Johny Yes Appa	Raghavan	
2018	Vallikudilile Vellakkaran	Tea Seller	
2019	Gramavasees	Gopalan	
2019	Puzhikkadakan	Josekutty	
2020	Uriyadi	Uthaman	
2020	Kozhipporu	Thomas	
2021	One	Auto Driver	
2021	Cold Case	Kunjeriya	
2021	Minnal Murali	Chandran	
2021	Oru Thathvika Avalokanam	Kili Darmodaran	
2022	Thirimali	Advocate	
2022	Archana 31 Not Out	Jignesh	
2022	CBI 5: The Brain	Head Constable Boban	
2022	Kochaal	Cleetus	
2022	Vazhakku	Reghu	
2022	Jaya Jaya Jaya Hey	Ani	
2022	Shefeekkinte Santhosham	Adv. Suresh Mathai	
2023	Kurukkan	Driver Manaf	
2023	Kannur Squad	CPO Jose Skaria	
2023	Pazhanjan Pranayam	Maniyan	
2024	Anweshippin Kandethum	CI Simon	
2024	All We Imagine as Light	Dr. Manoj	
2024	Thankamani	Thankachan	
2024	Vaazha – Biopic of a Billion Boys	Thomachan	
2024	Nunakkuzhi	CPO Santhosh	
2024	Gumasthan	Sura	
2024	Anand Sreebala	Antony	
2025	Aabhyanthara Kuttavaali	Deshavasi	
2025	Vyasanasametham Bandhumithradhikal	Murali	
2025	Raveendra Nee Evide?	Balan	
2025	Innocent	Sreeraj Prashanthan	
2025	Aaro — Someone	Auto Driver	Short film
2026	Baby Girl	Akbar	
2026	Prakambanam	Sidhu's uncle	
2026	Shukran		
2026	Madhuvidhu	Ambareesh	
2026	Varavu	Sethu	
2026	Pradhama Drishtiya Kuttakkar	SI Xavier	

== Controversy ==
In April 2017, Nedumangad was assaulted by a group of people for coming late to a stage program, which resulted in 70% hearing loss due to a perforated eardrum, as well as other injuries. (Note: Attributed to multiple sources on hearing loss.)
