= Vaazha: Biopic of a Billion Boys =

2024 Indian Malayalam-language film

- Theatrical release poster
- Directed by: Anand Menen
- Written by: Vipin Das
- Produced by: Vipin Das; Harris Desom; P. B. Anish; Adarsh Narayan; Icon Studios
- Starring: Siju Sunny; Amith Mohan Rajeswari; Joemon Jyothir; Anshid Anu; Anuraj O. B. Azees Nedumangad; Kottayam Nazeer; Noby Marcose; Gibin Gopinath; Arunsol
- Cinematography: Aravind Puthussery
- Edited by: Kannan Mohan
- Music by: Songs: Rajat Prakash; Nomadic Voice; Rakz Radiant; Parvatish Pradeep; Electronic Kili; Jay Stellar; Background Score: A Team
- Production companies: WBTS Productions; Imagin Cinemas; Signature Studios; Icon Studios
- Distributed by: Icon Cinemas
- Release date: 15 August 2024
- Running time: 125 minutes
- Country: India
- Language: Malayalam
- Box office: ₹38.25 crores

Vaazha: Biopic of a Billion Boys (transl. Plantain) is a 2024 Indian Malayalam-language coming-of-age comedy-drama film directed by Anand Menen and written by Vipin Das. The film stars Siju Sunny, Amith Mohan Rajeswari, Joemon Jyothir, Anshid Anu, Anuraj O. B. and Saaf.

It was released in theatres on 15 August 2024 to positive reviews from critics and was a commercial success. A spiritual sequel titled Vaazha II: Biopic of a Billion Bros was released on 2 April 2026.

== Plot ==
In a quiet town in Kerala, five teenage boys—Ajo, Vishnu, Moosa, Vivek, and Kalam—grow up constantly being told they're failures. Growing Up Under Pressure is a coming-of-age drama that follows a group of friends as they navigate the challenging transition from adolescence to adulthood. The film explores their struggles with societal and familial expectations to pursue traditional career paths like engineering or medicine, while grappling with their own dreams and uncertainties. Labeled as "underachievers" in their 20s, they face societal stigma and familial disappointment, which adds to their internal conflicts.

As the story unfolds, the focus shifts from achieving conventional success to embracing self-acceptance and finding their own paths in life. At its heart, the film delves into the complex relationships between fathers and sons, portraying emotional conflicts, generational gaps, and the eventual journey toward mutual understanding and reconciliation. Rather than offering a neatly wrapped conclusion, the film presents a realistic portrayal of growing up under pressure, emphasizing personal growth and the messy, beautiful complexities of adulthood.

== Cast ==
- Siju Sunny as Ajo Thomas
- Amith Mohan Rajeshwari as Vishnu Radhakrishnan
- Joemon Jyothir as Muhammad Al Bin Salim Ibrahim (Moosa)
- Anshid Anu as Vivek Anand
- Anuraj O. B. as Abdul Kalam
- Saaf as B. C. Vishwam
- Basil Joseph as police officer (cameo)
- Jagadish as Vishwam's father
- Azees Nedumangad as Thomachan
- Kottayam Nazeer as Radhakrishnan
- Noby Marcose as Ibrahim
- Gibin Gopinath as Vivek's father
- Arunsol as Kalam's father
- Meenakshi Unnikrishnan as Maya
- Sruthi Manikandan as Daisy
- Sminu Sijo as Vishnu's mother
- Priya Sreejith as Vishwam's mother
- Gouri Sankar as Astrologer
- Ziya Vincent as Reetha
- Hashir H. as Hashir
- Alan Bin Siraj as Alan
- Vinayak V. as Vinayak
- Ajin Joy as Ajin

== Production ==
The film was produced by Vipin Das under the banner of WBTS Productions, in association with Imagin Cinemas, headed by Harris Desom, P. B. Anish and Adarsh Narayan.

== Soundtrack ==
The soundtrack for the 2024 film Vaazha was released by Think Music. The soundtrack includes compositions by Rajat Prakash, Nomadic Voice, Parvatish Pradeep, Electronic Kili, and Jay Stellar. The album was released under the Think Music label.

== Release ==
Vazha - Biopic of a Billion Boys was theatrically released on 15 August 2024. A promotional event was held at the St. Teresa's College on 8 August 2024. The film released to JioHotstar on 23 September 2024.

== Reception ==
=== Box office ===
On the opening day of its release, the film grossed ₹1.5 crores worldwide. As of 18 August 2024, the film collected ₹5.50 crores worldwide. As of 21 August, the film grossed ₹16.60 crore. As of 2 September 2024, the film grossed ₹35 crores worldwide. As of 6 September 2024, film collected ₹40 crore worldwide.

=== Critical response ===
Saraswathy Nagarajan of The Hindu said that "some smart one-liner — some crude, some crackling — bring on the laughs" and wrote: "What works for this movie most is the relatability factor; director Anand Menen ensures that the narrative does not become maudlin, although the second half has plenty of scenes where it could have turned into a typical tear-jerker."

OTT Play called it "an impressive portrayal of the struggles and aspirations of boyhood". Vignesh Madhu of The New Indian Express rated the film 3 out of 5 and wrote: "The film works thanks largely to the smart casting choices and its effective emotional turn in the latter half."

Ajay U. K. of The News Minute rated the film 2 out of 5 stars and wrote: "Instead of attempting to call out the toxicity among male friendships, Anand Menen’s ‘Vaazha’ takes the reductionist approach of 'boys will be boys' and settles itself into locker-room talk."

== Sequels ==
The film ends with the title Vaazha 2 in the mid credits scene. On 21 August 2024, the makers announced the sequel, titled Vaazha II: Biopic of a Billion Bros, the main cast including Hashir, Alan, Ajin and Vinayak. The sequel was released on the second of April 2026, directed by debutant Savin SA and cinematographed by Akhil Lailasuran.

On 13 April 2026, writer Vipin Das shared a social media post hinting a third installment of the series. On 14 April 2026, the sequel titled Vaazha 3: Biopic of a Billion Girls was announced, to be directed by debutant Viswan Sreejith.
