= Vipin Das =

Indian film director and screenwriter

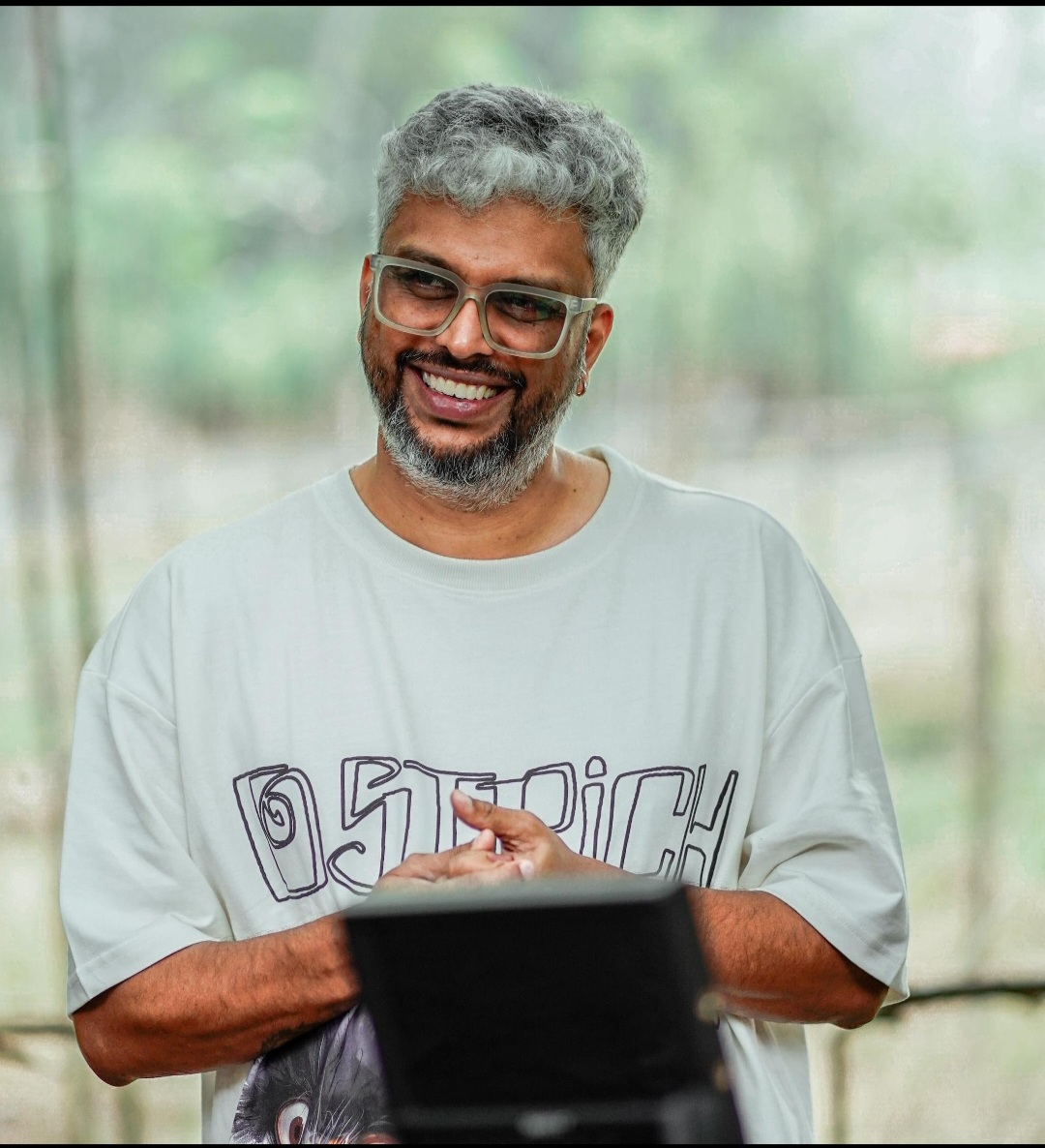
- Occupations: Director; screenwriter; producer
- Years active: 2016–present

Vipin Das is an Indian film director and screenwriter who works in Malayalam cinema. He is best known for directing the films Jaya Jaya Jaya Jaya Hey (2022) and Guruvayoor Ambalanadayil (2024). He also wrote and co-produced the films Vaazha: Biopic of a Billion Boys (2024) and Vaazha II: Biopic of a Billion Bros (2026); the latter being one of the highest-grossing Malayalam films of all-time.

== Career ==
Das had his directorial debut with the Malayalam film Mudhugauv in 2016. His second film, Antakshari was directly released to SonyLIV in April 2022. His third film, Jaya Jaya Jaya Jaya Hey, released on the 15th of November, 2022, became one of the biggest box office successes of the year.

== Filmography ==
=== As film director ===
Year	Title	Notes	Ref.
2016	Mudhugauv	Debut film	
2022	Antakshari		
2022	Jaya Jaya Jaya Jaya Hey		
2024	Guruvayoor Ambalanadayil		

=== As writer and producer ===
Year	Title	Credited as		Notes	Ref.
Year	Title	Writer	Producer	Notes	Ref.
2024	Vaazha: Biopic of a Billion Boys	Yes	Yes		
2025	Vyasanasametham Bandhumithradhikal	No	Yes		
2026	Vaazha II: Biopic of a Billion Bros	Yes	Yes		
