= Antakshari (film) =

- Directed by: Vipin Das
- Written by: Vipin Das; Renjit Varma
- Produced by: Abdul Jabbar; Al Jassam
- Starring: Saiju Kurup; Priyanka Nair; Sudhi Koppa; Kottayam Ramesh; Binu Pappu; Sandeep Pradeep; Sruthy Suresh
- Cinematography: Bablu Aju
- Edited by: Johnkutty
- Music by: Ankit Menon
- Production company: Sulthan Brothers Entertainment
- Distributed by: SonyLIV
- Release date: 22 April 2022
- Country: India
- Language: Malayalam

Antakshari is a 2022 Indian Malayalam-language thriller film directed by Vipin Das. The film stars Saiju Kurup, Priyanka Nair, Sudhi Koppa, Sandeep Pradeep, Kottayam Ramesh, Binu Pappu, Sruthy Suresh and others. It was released on 22 April 2022, on SonyLIV platform to mixed reviews from critics.

== Plot ==
The story follows Circle Inspector Das (Saiju Kurup), stationed in the town of Kedaram, known for his penchant for the game Antakshari. Unexpectedly, Das receives an anonymous phone call challenging him to participate in an Antakshari. When he refuses, his daughter becomes the target of an attack. Determined to unravel the mystery, he launches an investigation into the identity of the attacker, connecting past cases with similar patterns. The film explores Das's journey as he unravels the truth behind the escalating events.

== Cast ==
- Saiju Kurup as CI Das
- Priyanka Nair as Nurse Chithra
- Sudhi Koppa as SI Sreenivas
- Binu Pappu as DYSP Jayachandran Nair
- Vijay Babu as Vasudevan
- Sabareesh Varma as Ananthan
- Kottayam Ramesh as SCPO Hariharan
- Sreejith Kaiveli as Kishore
- Boban Samuel as Unni
- Sandeep Pradeep as Karthik
- Sruthy Suresh as CPO Sujatha

== Reception ==
Sajin Shrijith of Cinema Express rated the film 4/5 stars and wrote "Antakshari is a long, scary sequence that has Das in the woods at night, armed with just a torchlight, in the hope of confronting the killer." Vishnu Muraleedharan of Onmanorama wrote "A nostalgic game gets a terrific makeover. S.R. Praveen of The Hindu wrote "The path to the killer is strewn with so many red herrings and parallel tracks, that the scriptwriter even forgets to bring closure to some of these in the end." Suyog Zore of Cinestaan gave 2 stars out of 5 and wrote "Despite the excellent cinematography, production design and background score, the film's underwhelming climax lessens its overall impact." A review for The News Minute rated the film 2.5/5 stars and wrote "The film manages to maintain the suspense, but it tries to tell too much and fails to do it properly."
