= Jaya Jaya Jaya Jaya Hey =

- Directed by: Vipin Das
- Written by: Vipin Das; Nashid Mohamed Famy
- Produced by: Lakshmi Warrier; Ganesh Menon
- Starring: Basil Joseph; Darshana Rajendran
- Cinematography: Bablu Aju
- Edited by: Johnkutty
- Music by: Ankit Menon
- Production company: Cheers Entertainments
- Distributed by: Icon Cinemas Release
- Release date: 28 October 2022
- Running time: 140 minutes
- Country: India
- Language: Malayalam
- Box office: est.₹43–50 crore

Jaya Jaya Jaya Jaya Hey is a 2022 Indian Malayalam-language black comedy film directed by Vipin Das. The film stars Darshana Rajendran and Basil Joseph. Jaya Jaya Jaya Jaya Hey was released theatrically on 28 October 2022. A satire on gender stereotypes, the film received highly positive reviews from both critics and audiences and was a blockbuster at the box office. The film was remade in Telugu as Om Shanti Shanti Shantihi in 2026.

== Plot ==
Jayabharathi alias Jaya, is a middle-class woman. Her family, under the guise of protecting Jaya, take every decision for her. Her parents take an active interest in her brother's future and enroll him in a college, despite it being very expensive. But, when it is Jaya's turn, they do not care about her interests and enroll her in a cheaper college nearby. Despite all this, Jaya tries to take control of her life and rebels against her parents occasionally. After one such rebellion, involving a romance with an outwardly progressive and feminist college lecturer who is actually an insecure and possessive chauvinist, her parents decide to marry Jaya off before she gets to complete her education.

A poultry farm owner Rajesh is deemed the perfect groom for Jaya, despite his lack of education and knowledge of anything outside poultry business, especially after he agrees to let Jaya continue her studies. After their marriage, Jaya learns that Rajesh is aggressive and short tempered and has little regard for others. He also postpones Jaya's education, as he is lazy and has problems in his farm. He is set in his ways and is adamant that everything be as he desires. Rajesh eventually starts abusing Jaya by slapping and shouting at her. Jaya tries to get the support of her parents, who tell her to "adjust" and continue being the ideal wife.

Jaya starts secretly learning the martial arts Kalaripayattu and Karate via YouTube. Eventually, Jaya beats up Rajesh when he attempts to snatch her phone. Feeling humiliated, Rajesh talks to his cousin Ani on how to deal with this. He starts learning Karate as well to take revenge. He sets up his phone on record and provokes Jaya into beating him up so he can black mail her. This plan fails when she kicks him into the phone.

This is witnessed by Rajesh's mother and Jaya's parents are called over. The issue is settled with Jaya and Rajesh being forced to apologise to each other. Ani and Rajesh conspire to make Jaya believe Rajesh changed for good so he can impregnate her and confine her to a family life. Jaya eventually becomes pregnant, believing Rajesh has changed. She gets suspicious, however, when, at a doctor's visit, Rajesh shows signs of having been secretly trying to get her pregnant. She confronts Rajesh, who confesses. This shocks her, following which her blood pressure spikes and leads her into a miscarriage.

Both Jaya's and Rajesh's family blame Jaya for the miscarriage. She walks out on them and starts living in a women's hostel with her brother's help. She attempts to open a tailoring unit but has trouble securing a loan as she did not complete her degree. Meanwhile, the video of Jaya's and Rajesh's fight goes viral after the phone repairmen uploads it online. Humiliated, Rajesh attempts for a divorce. His business also starts losing customers to his rival whom he refused to help earlier.

In the family court, the presiding judge initially berates Jaya for assaulting Rajesh, believing him to be innocent. But the truth comes to light when Jaya says that the divorce case reached the court only because Jaya was unaware of it as Rajesh did not consult her. Rajesh reveals his chauvinistic nature in the courtroom, in front of the judge, who is a woman. She calls out Rajesh on his lack of knowledge of a woman's needs and role in a family and says that a woman requires equality, liberty and justice in a healthy family. She then tells the duo to sort everything out. Jaya signs the divorce papers. She then says that she sells her chicken at a lower price than him, revealing that she took over Rajesh's rival's poultry farm after Rajesh had refused to buy it. Her business decisions led to her company getting higher profits. Jaya beats up Rajesh's goons who had come to intimidate the previous owner to increase his prices.

== Cast ==
- Darshana Rajendran as Jayabharathi (Jaya)
  - Agni Mithra as Young Jaya
- Basil Joseph as Rajesh, Jaya's husband
- Aju Varghese as Karthikeyan, the college professor who romances Jaya
- Azees Nedumangad as Ani, Rajesh's cousin
- Anand Manmadhan as Jayan, Jaya's brother
- Sheethal Zackaria as Raji, Rajesh's sister
- Manju Pillai as the family court magistrate
- Noby Marcose as Kannappan, Rajesh's advocate
- Sudheer Paravoor as Mani, Jaya's maternal uncle
- Harish Pengan as Narayanan, Poultry businessman
- Sarath Sabha as Santhosh, Rajesh's poultry worker
- Kudassanad Kanakam as Lakshmi, Rajesh’s mother
- Biju Kalavedi as Jaya's father
- Usha Chandrababu as Latha, Jaya's mother
- Arunsol as Pastor

== Production ==
The director, Vipin Das, announced the film on 26 January 2022 by releasing its poster. The shooting of the movie began in Kollam on 12 May 2022 after the pooja ceremony. The shooting lasted for about 42 days. The filming of the movie was completed on 21 June 2022. The film was censored with a U-certificate one week prior to its release.

== Soundtrack ==
Jaya Jaya Jaya Jaya Hey

Soundtrack album by Ankit Menon
- Recorded: 2022
- Studios: Audiogene Sound Studios, Ernakulam; Pop Media House, Ernakulam
- Genre: Feature film soundtrack
- Length: 16:43
- Language: Malayalam
- Label: Saina Music
- Producers: Ankit Menon, Electronic Kili, Parvatish Pradeep

Ankit Menon chronology
| Thirike (2021) | Jaya Jaya Jaya Jaya Hey (2022) | Thala (2022) |

Jaya Jaya Jaya Jaya Hey
| No. | Title | Length |
|---|---|---|
| 1. | "Enthanithu Engottithu" | 3:06 |
| 2. | "Jaya Jaya Jaya Jaya Hey Theme Song" | 2:17 |
| 3. | "Jhalakraani Song" | 4:13 |
| 4. | "Ingaatt Nokanda" | 3:49 |
| 5. | "Kaatti Tharaam" | 3:18 |
| Total length: | | 16:43 |

== Release ==
=== Theatrical ===
Initially the film was planned to be released on 21 October 2022. Then the makers postponed it by a week and was released in theatres on 28 October 2022.

=== Home media ===
The digital rights of the film is acquired by Disney+ Hotstar. The satellite rights of the film is owned by Asianet.

== Reception ==
=== Critical response ===
On the review aggregator website Rotten Tomatoes, 83% of 6 critics' reviews are positive, with an average rating of 5.8/10.

In a mixed review for Firstpost, Anna M. M. Vetticad stated that “The film's overall blend is off balance, but in one key area it remains unfailingly on message: its tone consistently mocks abuse and abusers, never the abused.” Rating the film 2.75/5, she wrote that it was “a film that is purportedly about a survivor of domestic violence but does not give (the protagonist) the interiority her husband gets.” Padmakumar K of Onmanorama reviewed the film as subtly told in the light of humour, the narrative drives home the point with a punch and thereby breaks several romantic conventions, both in cinema and in society.

=== Box office ===
The film was made on a budget of ₹5 crores. It grossed over ₹45 crores in 25 days from box office.
