= Santhy Balachandran =

Indian actress

- Born: Kottayam, Kerala, India
- Education: Post-graduation in Anthropology, Wolfson College, University of Oxford
- Occupation: Actress
- Years active: 2017–present

Santhy Balachandran is an Indian actress who works predominantly in Malayalam cinema. Initially a theatre actress, she made her feature film debut as the heroine in the 2017 Malayalam comedy thriller film Tharangam.

== Career ==
=== Theatre ===
Santhy played the lead role in Harold Pinter's play The Lover directed by Sanal Aman. After the play was staged in Kochi she was approached by director Dominic Arun with an offer of a role in his film Tharangam. She has also acted in plays including A Very Normal Family directed by Roshan Mathew where she played Sweety. She was approached to play the role after her performance in The Lover.

=== Feature films ===
Santhy made her feature film debut in Dominic Arun's fantasy black comedy film Tharangam (2017), opposite Tovino Thomas. Her role was that of a contemporary girl, Malini, who is in a relationship with Pappan, played by Tovino. Santhy described her character as a "bold, independent guest lecturer who is quite a bossy and serious type but ends up being funny". Reviewer Anjana George of The Times of India wrote that Santhy "deserves a special mention as she has given life to Malu, the otherwise loving girlfriend with an interesting psychological disorder, pretty well". She played the lead role in Randu per which went on to be included in the International competition section of International Film Festival of Kerala in 2017. She played a young lady on the verge of break-up in the film. The film was released in 2021 through OTT platforms.

She enacted the only female character in Lijo Jose Pellissery's Jallikkattu (2018) where she played Sophie, "somebody with her own agenda and who is no pushover", according to Santhy. She also added that "it was interesting to be cast as a character who was very unlike her and that she had to run up against the idea that she was too urban and cannot be cast in a role that is rooted in the local space". In the 2020 film Paapam Cheyyathavar Kalleriyatte she played Linda who according to her takes "actions that are abnormal by others’ standards, but is doing what comes naturally to her“. She admitted that "it was a challenge to be impulsive without being over-the-top". Sajin Shrijith of The New Indian Express wrote: "Santhy Balachandran shines in a role that evokes the yesteryear performances of Revathi and Urvashi". In 2021, she featured in Bibin Paul Samuel's film Aaha, co-starring Indrajith Sukumaran. Arun George of OnManorama labelled her performance as Mary "powerful and graceful".

Santhy starred opposite Soubin Shahir in the fantasy drama film Djinn, directed by Siddharth Bharathan. She also appeared in Siddharth Bharathan's Chathuram opposite Swasika, Alencier Ley Lopez and Roshan Mathew.

== Filmography ==
=== Films ===
Key
†	Denotes films that have not yet been released

Year	Film	Role	Notes	Ref.
2017	Tharangam	Malini		
2019	Jallikkattu	Sophie		
2020	Paapam Cheyyathavar Kalleriyatte	Linda		
2021	Randuper	Ria	OTT release	
2021	Aaha	Mary		
2022	Chathuram	Jijimol		
2023	Djinn	Safa		
2023	Gulmohar	Reshma Saeed	Hindi film; released on Disney+ Hotstar	
2023	Ennennum	Devi		
2025	Ariku			
2025	Lokah Chapter 1: Chandra	Unnamed	Additional screenplay and dramaturgist; cameo appearance	
2026	Masthishka Maranam	Veda		
2026	Ananthan Kaadu	Karthi	Bilingual film	
2026	Baththa	Selvi	Tamil film	

=== Web series ===
Year	Series	Role	Notes	Ref.
2019	Meen Aviyal	—N/a	Assistant director & Dubbing artist	
2023	Sweet Kaaram Coffee	Niveditha	Tamil debut	
2025	The Chronicles of the 4.5 Gang	Kingini		

=== Music videos ===
Year	Film	Role	Director	Notes	Ref.
2021	Oblivion	—N/a	Dominic Arun	Writer & Executive Producer	

== Personal life ==
Santhy hails from Kottayam district of Kerala. She has lived in different parts of India because of her parents' transferable jobs. She holds a postgraduate degree in visual anthropology from Oxford University. She is also an artist who has conducted six solo exhibitions in various cities and has been part of various group exhibitions.
