= Lokah Chapter 1: Chandra =

2025 Indian film by Dominic Arun

- Theatrical release poster
- Directed by: Dominic Arun
- Written by: Dominic Arun
- Produced by: Dulquer Salmaan
- Starring: Kalyani Priyadarshan; Naslen; Sandy; Chandu Salim Kumar; Arun Kurian; Dulquer Salmaan
- Cinematography: Nimish Ravi
- Edited by: Chaman Chakko
- Music by: Jakes Bejoy
- Production company: Wayfarer Films
- Distributed by: Wayfarer Films
- Release date: 28 August 2025
- Running time: 150 minutes
- Country: India
- Language: Malayalam
- Budget: est. ₹30−40 crore
- Box office: est. ₹302–304 crore (Note: Lokah Chapter 1: Chandra's reported worldwide gross is from ₹301.98 crore (The Telegraph) to ₹302.5 crore (ThePrint) to ₹303.2 crore (The Week) to ₹304 crore (The Hollywood Reporter))

Lokah Chapter 1: Chandra is a 2025 Indian Malayalam-language superhero film written and directed by Dominic Arun and produced by Dulquer Salmaan for Wayfarer Films. It stars Kalyani Priyadarshan (in the title role) and Naslen, with Sandy, Chandu Salim Kumar and Arun Kurian in other significant roles and a cameo from Tovino Thomas and a vocal of Mammooty. In the film, Chandra , a mysterious woman, comes to Bengaluru to fight the evil. Her life changes after she meets young Sunny and his friends, and gets entangled with a corrupt cop Nachiyappa and an organ-trafficking ring associated with him.

Pre-production began on 12 September 2024, with principal photography commencing under the working title Production No: 7, and was completed by 30 January 2025, lasting 94 days. The title was unveiled on 8 June 2025. Nimish Ravi, Chaman Chakko, and Jakes Bejoy formed the technical crew as the cinematographer, editor and music director respectively. Actress Santhy Balachandran is credited for additional screenplay.

Lokah Chapter 1: Chandra was released theatrically on 28 August 2025. Upon its release, the film received widespread critical acclaim. The film was a box office success, becoming the first Malayalam film to cross the ₹300 crore mark globally, and emerged the highest-grossing Malayalam film of all time until it was surpassed by Bethlehem Kudumba Unit (2026). Lokah Chapter 1: Chandra was among the highest-grossing Indian films of 2025, as well as one of the highest-grossing female-led Indian films of all-time.

== Plot ==
In a war-torn city, Chandra fights a female assassin sent by Ishtar and escapes from a ruined building.

In the present, Chandra is summoned from Sweden to Bangalore (Bengaluru) by Prakash and learns that the summons came from Moothon ("the Elder"). She obtains a fake passport & learns about They Live Among Us, a book credited to the pen name Joseph Dominic that describes detailed chronicles of supernatural beings, similar to the legendary Aithihyamala.

In Bangalore, Chandra lives quietly, working night shifts and is visiting the Holy Grail Café, owned by her ally Johny. Across the street lives Sunny and his friends Venu, a MBBS dropout student and Naijil. Sunny develops feelings for Chandra, though she remains distant.

Her powers are revealed when she intervenes to protect a co-worker from Sundar, a member of an organ trafficking ring led by crime boss/politician Gajendran and supported by Inspector Nachiyappa, a corrupt cop. Nachiyappa becomes suspicious of Chandra after learning that she had attacked Sundar violently. Chandra also saves Sunny from an accident and is subsequently invited to Naijil's birthday party. Their cat is scared of her presence and Chandra is visibly uncomfortable with the sight of blood.

Sunny begins to suspect her after seeing Kumar, a known criminal associate, regularly deliver sealed containers to her. His doubts increase when Naijil briefly disappears (though it is later explained he was detained by police). Chandra is later abducted by Sundar and his men, but she manages to kill them and escape. Sunny, attempting to rescue her, witnesses her powers. She confirms to him that she is a Yakshi.

Somewhere in the city, Verghese Kurien, narrates to his granddaughter the legend of Kalliyankattu Neeli: a tribal girl whose village was destroyed by a king enforcing caste segregation and after being bitten by a bat, developed supernatural abilities. After the king's men killed her parents, she killed them in revenge and became a guardian figure and a nightmare for wrongdoers. She was later recruited by legendary priest/sorcerer Kadamattathu Kathanar to serve Moothon. Verghese is revealed to be Joseph Dominic, and Chandra is revealed to be Neeli, now immortal.

Sunny later wakes up in Chandra's room and discovers her vulnerabilities when he witnesses her skin being burned by sunlight and healed by consuming packed red blood cells, the very contents of the containers supplied by Kumar. Later, Nachiyappa confronts Chandra while investigating the murders of the organ trafficking gang members, and during their fight, she bites him. Sunny and his friends arrive during the struggle, and Nachiyappa accidentally shoots Sunny before fleeing. Chandra then takes Sunny and his friends to the abandoned Michael’s Clinic. Subsequently, media reports label Chandra and Sunny as terrorists due to the attack on Nachiyappa and the deaths of the gang members. Chandra tells Sunny to inform the media and police that Sunny had nothing to do with it, and it was all Chandra's fault, if he is arrested.

Nachiyappa begins mutating into a yaksha as a result of Chandra's bite. Verghese visits him, warns him of Chandra's true identity, and collects a blood sample of his. At the clinic, Chandra explains her weaknesses—sunlight and her heart, which is fatal if directly attacked—and clarifies that her bite can transform only healthy individuals into yakshas, while others succumb to a rabies-like illness.

Two policemen raid the clinic, during which Chandra is shot in the head. She is rescued by Michael, who is revealed to be a Chathan keeping a low profile as a street magician. Michael uses hallucinations and illusions to defeat the police officers and escorts the group to the Holy Grail Café. There they pass through a bloody hallway being cleaned and notice a mysterious hooded figure. Chandra shows Sunny a photograph of her lover, Michael Joseph, a British officer from 1905 who resembles him. It is also revealed that Johny is a descendant of Kathanar. Meanwhile, Nachiyappa begins to enjoy his newly acquired powers and develops a god complex. He attempts to bite his mother in an effort to make her immortal, but she dies.

Meanwhile, the cafe is surrounded by the government's Garuda Force, who try to appeal to Chandra in surrendering; unwilling to do so, the Garuda Force barges in to the cafe. Chandra successfully takes them down but is quickly targeted by Gajendran's men, who shoot her heart, fatally injuring her. However, she heals herself by consuming a blood packet provided by Sunny and defeats them. Nachiyappa, who has fully transformed into a yaksha, confronts her in front of Sunny, Naijil, and Venu. After a bloody fight, she kills him by stabbing his heart with a dagger. Afterwards, she retreats underground, saying goodbye to Sunny.

In the mid-credits scene, the mysterious hooded figure is revealed to be Charlie, an Odiyan, who had eliminated the traffickers from the syndicate who came for a parley.

In the post-credits scene, Michael is being questioned by a man about a group of archaeologists who disappeared inside a cave after traveling with a monk; the monk went only partway, while the archaeologists ventured deeper and never returned. Only a camera was recovered, containing a photograph of a man identical to Michael. Michael responds that the photo is of one of his 389 siblings.

== Cast ==
- Kalyani Priyadarshan as Chandra Ananya / Kalliyankattu Neeli, a yakshi (Voice dubbed by Sayanora Philip)
  - Durga C. Vinod as Young Neeli (flashback)
- Naslen in a dual role as:
  - Sunny Kurian, Chandra's neighbour and friend
  - Michael Joseph, A British soldier and Chandra's love interest in 1905 (photograph)
- Sandy as Inspector Nachiyappa Gowda, an evil police officer turned to a yaksha
- Chandu Salim Kumar as Venu, Sunny's friend, a MBBS dropout
- Arun Kurian as Naijil, Sunny's friend
- Raghunath Paleri as Tom Isaac
- Vijayaraghavan as Dr. Varghese Kurian / Joseph Dominic (pen name)
- Jain Andrews as Home Minister Murugesan
- Shivajith Padmanabhan in a dual role as:
  - Gajendran
  - King Senapathy (flashback)
- Yughan as Achuthan, King Senapathy's right-men (flashback)
- Nithya Shri as Young Neeli's mother (flashback)
- Alwin Mukund as Young Neeli's friend (flashback)
- Saanvi Sanoj as Young Neeli's friend (flashback)
- Vishnu Priya Thoppil as Sundari
- Nishanth Sagar as Prakash, Moothon's helper
- Sam Mohan as Johnny
- Shanto Johns as Kumar
- Sarath Sabha as Sundar
- Veena Kaladharan as Rose
- Shivakamy Shyamaprasad as Roopa
- Shibin S Raghav as Mr. Nobody, Roopa's friend
- Bibin Perumbilli as CPO Jagdish Rao, Nachiyappa Gowda's right-men
- Jeiya R as CI Radhika, Nachiyappa Gowda's senior lady police officer
- George Vijay Nelson as Nachiyappa Gowda's acquaintance
- Rakenth Pai as News Reporter

=== Cameo appearances ===
- Sunny Wayne as Kadamattathu Kathanar
- Tovino Thomas in a dual role as:
  - Michael, Maathan's younger twin brother, a Chathan
  - Maathan, Michael's elder evil twin brother, an Evil Chathan
- Dulquer Salmaan as Charlie, an Odiyan

The film features several other cameo appearances throughout, including Anna Ben as Anu, Sunny's ex-girlfriend, and Abraham Vadakkan as Scaria, Anu's boyfriend. Vishak Nair appears as a man at the pub, and Soubin Shahir, Santhy Balachandran, Ahaana Krishna, Balu Varghese, and Vijay Menon appear in cameo roles. An arm is shown for Moothon with Mammootty's voice-over.

== Production ==
Lokah Chapter: 1 Chandra is the seventh production venture of Dulquer Salmaan's Wayfarer Films. It is intended as the beginning of a full-fledged Malayalam superhero cinematic universe titled Lokah, a project being mounted on a large scale with a possibility of multiple chapters. Dulquer Salmaan aims to build an indigenous cinematic universe rooted in local culture, folklore, and mythology. Kalyani Priyadarshan and Naslen joined as the main cast. Kalyani had practiced martial arts for the film.

The film is written and directed by Dominic Arun, known for Tharangam (2017). Dominic Arun revealed that the idea for the film was discussed as early as 2020 and developed organically, emphasizing that creating a female superhero was not a deliberate attempt to break the mold. Santhy Balachandran has contributed to the additional screenplay and dramaturgy. The technical crew includes Nimish Ravi as the cinematographer, Chaman Chakko as the editor, Jakes Bejoy for music, Banglan as the production designer, and Yannick Ben handling action choreography. Melwy J. handled the costume design, collaborating with Archana Akhil Rao for specific sequences, including Kalyani Priyadarshan's looks. Jom Varghese and Bibin Perumballi served as executive producers.

The film's pre-production began on 12 September 2024, and the principal photography commenced with a muhurat pooja ceremony on the same day under the working title Production No: 7, marking Priyadarshan's first film with Naslen and her second film with Dulquer Salmaan's production company. Filming wrapped by 30 January 2025. Shooting lasted for 94 days. The film's title, Lokah – Chapter One: Chandra, was unveiled on 8 June 2025, with the cast including Chandu Salimkumar, Arun Kurian, Vijayaraghavan, Raghunath Paleri, Sarath Sabha, Nithya Shri, and Nishanth Sagar.

== Music ==
The film score and soundtrack were composed by Jakes Bejoy with the exception of one song composed by Jay Unnithan. The film's promo song, titled "Thani Lokah Murakkaari", sung by Jyoti Nooran of the Nooran Sisters in her Malayalam debut. The track, composed by Jakes Bejoy with rap portions by Reble, carries lyrics penned by writer-filmmaker Muhsin Parari, credited under his pseudonym "Mu.Ri".

== Release ==
=== Theatrical ===
Lokah was released theatrically in India on 28 August 2025. It was dubbed and released in Telugu, Hindi, Tamil and Kannada. Sithara Entertainments distributed the film in Andhra Pradesh and Telangana. AGS Entertainment distributed the film in Tamil Nadu, while Lighter Buddha Films distributed the film in Karnataka. Pen Studios acquired the distribution under Pen Marudhar Entertainment, in North India. Suraya Filem acquired the distribution for Malaysia.

=== Home media ===
The film began streaming on JioHotstar from 31 October 2025 in Malayalam and dubbed versions of Tamil, Hindi, Telugu, Kannada, Bengali and Marathi languages.

== Reception ==
=== Box office ===
Lokah Chapter 1: Chandra opened to ₹2.71 crore in Kerala and ₹6.66 crore worldwide. The film went on to collect ₹65.50 crore in its first four-day weekend run worldwide. Within seven days of release, the film's worldwide gross crossed ₹100 crore. In 9 days, the film grossed ₹145 crore. In 12 days the film had grossed ₹198 crore, and crossed ₹200 crore on its 13th day. In 19 days, the film crossed ₹250 crore at the worldwide box office.

The film has grossed over ₹300 crore globally, making it the highest grossing Malayalam film of all time, highest-grossing film in Kerala of all time (until it was surpassed by Vaazha II: Biopic of a Billion Bros in April 2026), highest-grossing Malayalam film in India, second highest-grossing Malayalam film overseas, one of the highest-grossing Indian superhero films and one of the highest-grossing Indian films featuring a female lead. The film is also the eighth highest grossing Indian film of all time in the Gulf Countries and second highest grossing Malayalam film in the Gulf Countries. In Malaysia, the film opened at tenth place at Malaysian Box office.

=== Critical response ===
Lokah Chapter 1: Chandra received generally positive reviews from critics. On the review aggregator website Rotten Tomatoes, 95% of 30 critics' reviews are positive, with an average rating of 7.6/10.

Anandu Suresh of The Indian Express gave 4/5 stars, noting that "What makes the Kalyani Priyadarshan and Naslen-starrer far better than other massive-budget fantasy spectacles is that its magnificence extends beyond visual brilliance to include impeccable writing". Vivek Santhosh of The New Indian Express gave the film 3.5/5 stars, terming it "A bold, imperfect but unforgettable step into Malayalam cinema's first mythic universe, where Kalyani Priyadarshan's Chandra embodies folklore, fire, and neon spectacle in a world still finding its full shape". Manjusha Radhakrishnan of Gulf News rated 4/5 and wrote, "Superhero saga done right blending Indian folklore with Hollywood swagger."

Roopa Radhakrishnan of The Times of India gave the film 3.5/5 stars and noted that while Lokah Chapter: 1 Chandra has its flaws, such as a slow start, overstretched feeling of cameos, and some jokes that don't land, its positives outweigh the negatives. Swathi P. Ajith of Onmanorama praised Lokah Chapter: 1 Chandra for its "bold" visual design and "immersive" world-building, noting its unique blend of Kerala folklore and the modern-day superhero genre. Athira M of The Hindu noted that Lokah Chapter: 1 Chandra handles the superhero genre with expertise, praising its "catchy" cinematic quality, visual effects, production design, and background score. The review highlighted Kalyani Priyadarshan's performance as "the first female superhero of Malayalam cinema".

== Accolades ==
Award	Ceremony date	Category	Recipients	Result	Ref.
Kerala Film Critics Association Awards	2 October 2026	Best Actress	Kalyani Priyadarshan	Won	
Kerala Film Critics Association Awards	2 October 2026	Best Director	Dominic Arun	Won	
Kerala Film Critics Association Awards	2 October 2026	Best Music Director	Jakes Bejoy	Won	
Kerala Film Critics Association Awards	2 October 2026	Best Makeup	Ronex Xavier	Won	
Kerala Film Critics Association Awards	2 October 2026	Best New Screenplay	Santhy Balachandran	Won	
JFW Movie Awards	10 February 2026	Best Film - Malayalam	Lokah Chapter 1: Chandra	Won	
JFW Movie Awards	10 February 2026	Best Actress in a Women-Led Film (Malayalam)	Kalyani Priyadarshan	Won	
THR Honours	19 February 2026	Best Films	Lokah Chapter 1: Chandra	Won	
Critics' Choice Awards	24 March 2026	Best Editing	Chaman Chakko	Won	
Indian National Cine Academy Awards	15–16 April 2026	Best Actress - Malayalam	Kalyani Priyadarshan	Won	
Indian National Cine Academy Awards	15–16 April 2026	Best Director - Malayalam	Dominic Arun	Won	
Indian National Cine Academy Awards	15–16 April 2026	Best Film - Malayalam	Lokah Chapter 1: Chandra	Won	
Indian Film Festival of Melbourne Awards	13 August 2026	Best Film	Lokah Chapter 1: Chandra	Won	
Indian Film Festival of Melbourne Awards	13 August 2026	Best Performance (Female)	Kalyani Priyadarshan	Nominated	
South Indian International Movie Awards	12–13 September 2026	Best Film - Malayalam	Lokah Chapter 1: Chandra	Won	
South Indian International Movie Awards	12–13 September 2026	Best Director - Malayalam	Dominic Arun	Nominated	
South Indian International Movie Awards	12–13 September 2026	Best Actress - Malayalam	Kalyani Priyadarshan	Won	
South Indian International Movie Awards	12–13 September 2026	Best Actor - Malayalam	Naslen	Nominated	
South Indian International Movie Awards	12–13 September 2026	Best Music Director - Malayalam	Jakes Bejoy	Nominated	
South Indian International Movie Awards	12–13 September 2026	Best Lyric Writer - Malayalam	Muhsin Parari	Nominated	
South Indian International Movie Awards	12–13 September 2026	Best Playback Singer (Female) - Malayalam	Jyoti Nooran	Nominated	
South Indian International Movie Awards	12–13 September 2026	Best Male Debut - Malayalam	Sandy	Won	
South Indian International Movie Awards	12–13 September 2026	Best Female Debut - Malayalam	Durga C. Vinod	Nominated	
South Indian International Movie Awards	12–13 September 2026	Best Cinematographer - Malayalam	Nimish Ravi	Nominated	
South Indian International Movie Awards	12–13 September 2026	Best Comedian - Malayalam	Chandu Salim Kumar	Nominated	

== Controversy ==
Some dialogues by the character Inspector Nachiyappa Gowda received outrage for negatively portraying the residents of Bengaluru. The dialogue referred to Bengaluru as "the hub of parties and drugs" and equating women in the city to prostitutes. Later the production house Wayfarer Films issued an open apology for hurting the sentiments of the people. It was also clarified that the story was not set in Bengaluru, but rather a fictional city in India, and that the filming took place in Bengaluru due to the right conditions for script. (Note: Nevertheless, the film still mentions that Chandra lives in Bengaluru.)

== Sequel ==
On 27 September 2025, the film's sequel was officially announced, titled Lokah Chapter 2, starring Tovino Thomas in the lead, reprising his roles from the first film. A special promotional video cum short film, featuring Dulquer Salmaan and Thomas was released by Wayfarer Films, and Salmaan is expected to reprise his role as well.

== See also ==
- List of Indian superhero films
