= Perilloor Premier League =

Indian comedy streaming television series

- Title card
- Genre: Comedy; Political
- Created by: Praveen Chandran
- Written by: Deepu Pradeep
- Starring: Sunny Wayne; Nikhila Vimal; Vijayaraghavan; Aju Varghese; Ashokan; Sajin Cherukayil
- Music by: Mujeeb Majeed
- Country of origin: India
- Original language: Malayalam
- No. of seasons: 1
- No. of episodes: 7

Production
- Producers: Mukesh R. Mehta and C.V. Sarathi
- Editor: Bavan Sreekumar

Original release
- Network: Disney+ Hotstar
- Release: 5 January 2024

Perilloor Premier League is an Indian Malayalam-language political comedy drama streaming television series directed by Praveen Chandran. Deepu Pradeep, the writer of this web series introduces the world of Perilloor, a setting that bears a striking resemblance to Desham, the locale featured in Pradeep's earlier comedy film Kunjiramayanam. The series features Malavika, portrayed by Nikhila Vimal, who accidentally becomes the Panchayat president of Perilloor Grama Panchayat after a series of unpredictable events. The cast includes Sunny Wayne, Vijayaraghavan, Ashokan, Aju Varghese and Sajin Cherukayil.

Season 1 of the series premiered on Disney+ Hotstar on 5 January 2024. It received positive reviews from critics.

== Premise ==
Peethambaran is unable to contest in the upcoming elections and so he urges his niece Malavika to run for Panchayat president. The question looms: will she agree to his plan? Understanding the predicament she's in, Malavika and her aunt hatch a plan to deliberately lose the election. In a twist, she turns to Psycho Balachandran for assistance. Later Malavika accidentally becomes the Panchayat president of Perilloor Grama Panchayat. This unexpected turn of events sets the stage for a captivating tale filled with humor.

Malavika had been in love with Sreekuttan since childhood. During their school days, she decides to propose him and creates a letter, with the drawing of a dragonfly as a dragonfly was present when they first met and when he helped her to get up, and hence she considered dragonfly as an integral part of their love story.

The day before Malu proposes him, he decides to watch a blue film when his parents are asleep. But hearing the sound of a crowd around, he runs outside, forgetting to switch off the television and his parents catch him red-handed. His father beats him up and the crowd hears the reason for it. The next day, everyone in the school teases him with the word "thumbi" (dragonfly) as the blue film he was watching was "kinnarathumbikal" That is when Malu gives him the letter and he assumes her to be mocking him and slaps her.

== Cast ==
- Sunny Wayne as Sreekuttan (Thumbikuttan)
- Nikhila Vimal as Malavika (Malu)
- Vijayaraghavan as Peethambaran
- Aju Varghese as Psycho Balachandran
- Ashokan as Keman Soman
- Sajin Cherukayil as Chandu
- Shivaji Guruvayoor as Radhakrishnan
- Gopika Ramesh as Surabhi
- Deepika Das as Puja
- Sarath Sabha as Ambareesh
- Arun Pradeep as Vasu
- Priya Sreejith as Lilly
- Keerthana Sreekumar as Varsha
- Vijitha Vijayakumar as Shamla
- P. P. Kunhikrishnan as Manikandan
- Kiran Peethambaran as Uthaman

== Episodes ==
No. overall	No. in season	Title	Directed by	Written by	Original release date
1	1	"Welcome To Perilloor"	Praveen Chandran	Deepu Pradeep	5 January 2024
2	2	"Not Heaven But Hell"	Praveen Chandran	Deepu Pradeep	5 January 2024
3	3	"Fox 1, Tiger 0"	Praveen Chandran	Deepu Pradeep	5 January 2024
4	4	"Reality Bites"	Praveen Chandran	Deepu Pradeep	5 January 2024
5	5	"All Hope Lost"	Praveen Chandran	Deepu Pradeep	5 January 2024
6	6	"Unleashing Fury"	Praveen Chandran	Deepu Pradeep	5 January 2024
7	7	"Thank You, Visit Again"	Praveen Chandran	Deepu Pradeep	5 January 2024
