= Odiyan (soundtrack) =

- Soundtrack album cover

Soundtrack album by M. Jayachandran
- Released: 8 December 2018
- Recorded: 2017–2018
- Genre: Feature film soundtrack
- Length: 21:45
- Language: Malayalam
- Label: Satyam Audios
- Producer: M. Jayachandran

M. Jayachandran chronology
Koode (2018)	Odiyan (2018)	Pattabhiraman (2019)

Odiyan is the feature film soundtrack for the 2018 film of the same name. It features five songs composed by M. Jayachandran, the lyrics were written by Rafeeq Ahamed, Lakshmi Shrikumar, and Prabha Varma, and the songs were sung by Shreya Ghoshal, Sudeep Kumar, Shankar Mahadevan, M. G. Sreekumar, and Mohanlal each. The background score for the film was composed by Sam C. S., making his debut in Malayalam cinema. The soundtrack was released on 16 November 2018.

== Production ==
=== Songs ===
Menon demanded five songs in the narrative, which should "capture the listener's imagination right away" and also should be distinct in its sound. Although he composed the tunes for the songs within five days, he had to make changes on the soundscape and treatment multiple times and took extreme care in the instrumentation. Hence, Jayachandran took nearly one-and-a-half years working on the film's songs. Albeit the songs being meant from periodic setting, Jayachandran wanted the music to sound fresh so that it would appeal modern listeners. Menon wanted the songs to have a folk touch as the film's story is based on a fairy tale and was familiar with the stories of Odiyan legend he heard during his childhood.

In June 2017, Mohanlal shared the behind-the-scenes video of the composing sessions at GreenPark hotel in Chennai with Jayachandran playing the tunes and lyricists Rafeeq Ahamed and Lakshmi Shrikumar were present. For the song "Kondoram", Ahamed wrote the lyrics after the tune was composed, and the lines resembled the style of dialogue writing. Recording took place at Musik Lounge Studio Chennai and New Edge Studios in Mumbai. Menon wanted Shreya Ghoshal and Shankar Mahadevan for performing the vocals for two songs. Ghoshal recorded female vocals for the duet "Kondoram" and the song "Maanam" during July 2017, with Jayachandran and Ahamed directing her on the pronunciations. Mahadevan recorded the song "Nenjile" in August 2017, which according to Jayachandran, was the "most challenging composition". M. G. Sreekumar recorded the song "Muthappante" the same month, who described it as the best song he recorded after a long time. In August 2018, a folk song "Enoruvan" was recorded with Mohanlal providing vocals for the song written by Varma.

=== Score ===
For the film's score, Menon chose Sam after he was impressed by his work in Vikram Vedha (2017), and he joined the film after the songs has already been composed. Composition of the film's score began in January 2018. Following his usual method, Sam composed the score beforehand based on the screenplay, contrary to the conventional method of scoring the filmed scenes during post-production. The musical score was then played while filming. Since the film had a period setting, old ethnic musical instruments of Kerala was utilised in the score, which includes an old bamboo instrument of six-feet length. An old lady was roped in for recording the instrument due to her expertise with it. The film's theme music was chosen from four themes composed by Sam. The re-recording of the score completed within 3 December 2018, few days before the film's release.

== Marketing and release ==
The music rights were sold to Satyam Audios for ₹1 crore (US$110,000). A lyrical video for the song "Kondoram" was released on 19 November 2018; it garnered around 4.3 million views which Jayachandran felt that no Malayalam song "[had] ever made this kind of an impact on YouTube without visuals". The behind-the-scenes video for the song "Enoruvan" with Mohanlal performing the vocals at his studio, was released on 6 December. The soundtrack was released at the film's global launch event held in Dubai Festival City Mall at the Dubai Festival City on 8 December. The song "Kondoram" was performed by Mohanlal and Manju Warrier at a fundraiser event organised by the Association of Malayalam Movie Artists (AMMA) in Abu Dhabi, for the relief and rehabitation efforts for those who were affected by the 2018 Kerala floods. The music video for "Maanam" was released on 9 December.

== Track listing ==
No.	Title	Lyrics	Singer(s)	Length
1.	"Kondoram"	Rafeeq Ahamed	Shreya Ghoshal, Sudeep Kumar	5:00
2.	"Maanam"	Rafeeq Ahamed	Shreya Ghoshal	4:54
3.	"Enoruvan"	Prabha Varma	Mohanlal	2:59
4.	"Nenjile"	Lakshmi Shrikumar	Shankar Mahadevan	4:51
5.	"Muthappante"	Lakshmi Shrikumar	M. G. Sreekumar	3:50

== Reception ==
The soundtrack and background score received positive reviews. Vipin Nair of Music Aloud wrote "a soundtrack that works in parts" and admitted that "A movie of this scale deserved a more wholesome album, but this is a neat piece of work nevertheless, one whose soundscape stays very faithful to the movie's settings." Janani K. of India Today wrote "M Jayachandran's songs and Sam CS's background score elevate several scenes". Sanjith Sidhardhan of The Times of India stated that Jayachandran's songs, with "Kondoram" in particular, were "well picturised".

== Accolades ==
Award (Note: Awards, festivals and organizations are in alphabetical order.)	Date of ceremony (Note: Date is linked to the article about the awards held that year, wherever possible.)	Category	Recipient(s)	Result	Ref.
Asianet Film Awards	6–7 April 2019	Best Music Director	M. Jayachandran (Note: also for Koode)	Won	
Asianet Film Awards	6–7 April 2019	Best Lyricist	Rafeeq Ahamed (Note: also for Aami)	Nominated	
Filmfare Awards South	21 December 2019	Best Female Playback Singer – Malayalam	Shreya Ghoshal – ("Maanam")	Nominated	
South Indian International Movie Awards	15–16 August 2019	Best Lyricist – Malayalam	Rafeeq Ahamed – ("Kondoram")	Nominated	
Vanitha Film Awards	2 March 2019	Best Music Director	M. Jayachandran	Won	
Vanitha Film Awards	2 March 2019	Best Lyricist	Rafeeq Ahamed – ("Kondoram")	Won	
Vanitha Film Awards	2 March 2019	Best Female Playback Singer	Shreya Ghoshal – ("Maanam")	Won	
Vanitha Film Awards	2 March 2019	Best Duet Song	Sudeep Kumar and Shreya Ghoshal – ("Kondoram")	Won	
