= Dominic Arun =

Indian film director

- Born: 27th May
- Occupations: Film director; screenwriter

Dominic Arun is an Indian film director and screenwriter who works in Malayalam cinema. He is best known for his second directorial Lokah Chapter 1: Chandra (2025).

== Career ==
Dominic made his debut in the film industry as a screenwriter with Style (2016). He then debuted as a director with Tharangam (2017) starring Tovino Thomas and produced by Dhanush.

His second directorial, Lokah Chapter 1: Chandra (2025), was a female-led superhero film starring Kalyani Priyadarshan, Naslen, Arun Kurian, and Sandy. Produced by Dulquer Salmaan, it opened to widespread critical acclaim from both the critics and audience, alike. It quickly went on to gross over ₹300 crores worldwide and became one of the highest-grossing Indian films with a female lead and the highest-grossing Malayalam film of all-time.

== Filmography ==
=== Feature films ===
Year	Title	Director	Writer	Notes	Ref.
2016	Style	No	Yes		
2017	Tharangam	Yes	Yes		
2025	Lokah Chapter 1: Chandra	Yes	Yes		

=== Shorts ===
Year	Title	Type	Director	Writer	Notes	Ref.
2014	Credo	Short	Yes	Yes		
2016	Mrithyumjayam	Short	Yes	Yes		
2021	Oblivion	Music video	Yes	No		
2025	When Legends Chill: Michael x Charlie	Short	Yes	Yes	Promotional clip for Lokah Chapter 2	
