= The Chronicles of the 4.5 Gang =

- Promotional Release Poster
- Genre: Crime comedy
- Created by: Krishand
- Written by: Krishand
- Directed by: Krishand
- Starring: Sanju Sivram; Darshana Rajendran; Jagadish
- Country of origin: India
- Original language: Malayalam
- No. of seasons: 1
- No. of episodes: 6

Production
- Cinematography: Vishnu Prabhakar
- Running time: 47 - 72 minutes

Original release
- Network: SonyLIV
- Release: 29 August 2025 – present

The Chronicles of the 4.5 Gang (stylised as 4.5 Gang, also known as Sambhava Vivaranam Nalara Sangham) is a 2025 Indian Malayalam-language crime comedy streaming television series created and directed by Krishand. It stars Sanju Sivram, Darshana Rajendran, Jagadish in lead roles. The series premiered on SonyLIV on 29 August 2025.

== Premise ==
Set in Thiruvanchipuram (a fictional version of Thiruvananthapuram), the series follows a group of five slum boys who dream of making it big amidst the chaotic world of crime, comedy, and survival.

== Cast ==
- Sanju Sivram as Arikuttan / Arun, member of the 4.5 gang
- Niranj Maniyanpilla Raju as Althaf, member of the 4.5 gang
- Sreenath Babu as Kanji / Sudev, member of the 4.5 gang
- Shambhu as Maniyan, member of the 4.5 gang
- Sachin Joseph as Moonga / Murali Gangadharan , member of the 4.5 gang
- Jagadish as Maithreyan, a writer
- Indrans as Balachandran, Arikuttan's father
- Hakim Shahjahan as Pookkada Valsan, a businessman
- Darshana Rajendran as Ramani, Valsan's wife
- Vijayaraghavan as the music director
- Vishnu Agasthya as Pyelakuttan
- Alexander Prasanth as Bruce Lee
- Santhy Balachandran as Kingini, Arikuttan's love interest
- Zarin Shihab as Pranitha, Maniyan's love interest
- Rahul Rajagopal as S. I. Suresh
- Zhinz Shan as S. I. Stalin
- Geethi Sangeetha as advocate Sukumari
- Krishand as Superstar Vikraman
- Vigneshwar Suresh as Senthil

== Episodes ==
No. in season	Title	Directed by	Original release date
1	"Attack on the Cop"	Krishand R. K.	28 August 2025
Arikuttan arrives Auran to hire a writer who would reshape his gang's crime ridden past through his book. He explains his childhood memories about Thiruvanjipuram to the writer.
2	"Gangster take over Ponakkavu"	Krishand R. K.	28 August 2025
S I Suresh who was attacked by Bruce Lee and Pyelakuttan asks the 4.5 gang to take revenge for him in promise of sizable amount. The 4.5 gang sets to Bonakkad in search of them.
3	"Ponkashi Milk Mafia at large"	Krishand R. K.	28 August 2025
S I Suresh uses them continuously for gold smuggling and in an incident Arikittan gets shot which makes them leave gold smuggling and then they enters into milk smuggling mafia at Ponkashi.
4	"Goons take over the state capital"	Krishand R. K.	28 August 2025
Arikuttan gets jailed for milk smuggling. Senthil who was attacked by 4.5 gang comes back to Thadippalam with his relatives to take revenge.
5	"Cold Blooded Christmas"	Krishand R. K.	28 August 2025
S I Suresh makes a plot to seize control over city's flower trade by attacking Pookkada Valsan's house on a Christmas Night. But things go out of control when Kanji murdered Pookada Valsan.
6	"Gunfires at the Festival"	Krishand R. K.	28 August 2025
Kanji gets jailed for murdering Pookada Valsan. Meanwhile Flower business flourishes and gang leads a temple festival which was their dream. Moments of attack, revenge and betrayal takes place during the festival.

== Production ==
The series is written and directed by Krishand, known for his unconventional storytelling style. The project was initially announced under the title Sambhava Vivaranam Nalara Sangham.

== Release ==
The series, under its final title The Chronicles of the 4.5 Gang, was released on SonyLIV on 29 August 2025.

== Reception ==
The Chronicles of the 4.5 Gang opened to widespread critical acclaim upon its release.

The Indian Express hailed it as "the best Malayalam series yet," praising Krishand’s inventive storytelling and the way he redefined the gangster genre on streaming platforms.

The Hindu described the series as "clever and entertaining," highlighting its sharp writing and the director’s unique ability to balance crime and satire.

The New Indian Express called it "an audacious gangster epic told with mischief and bite," commending the ensemble cast and its daring narrative choices.

The News Minute echoed this sentiment, writing that the show is "crooked, funny, and oddly endearing," applauding its quirky tone.

According to The Times of India, the series successfully "gets its formula right," offering a refreshing take on the gangster saga format in Malayalam web content.

The Week compared it to Gangs of Wasseypur, labeling it "Malayalam cinema’s answer" to the cult Hindi franchise, particularly admiring its scale and ambition.

OTTplay praised the series as "wacky" and "stamped with Krishand’s signature style."

Times Now described it as "an amusing series that gets its formula right."
