= Sanju Sivram =

Indian actor

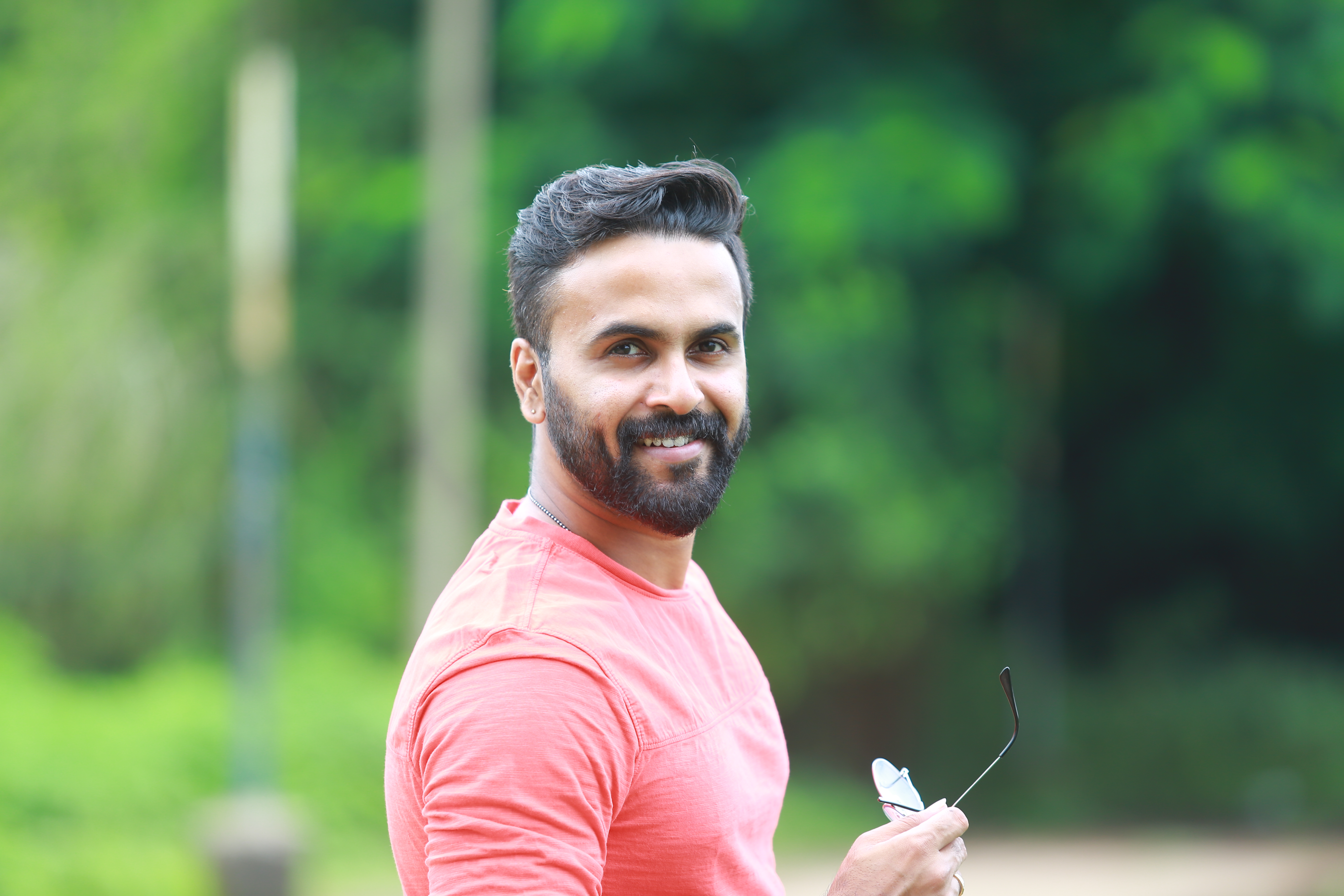
- Sanju Sivram
- Born: Calcutta (now Kolkata), West Bengal, India
- Occupation: Actor
- Years active: 2013–present

Sanju Sivram is an Indian actor primarily known for his work in Malayalam cinema. He made his debut in 2012 with the film Nee Ko Njaa Cha, a major hit that helped usher in the new generation wave in Malayalam films. His next notable project was the 2013 release 1983. In addition to his work in Malayalam cinema, Sanju has also appeared in a Telugu film.

== Early life ==
Sanju was born in Kolkata, where his parents were employed. During his childhood, he moved to his hometown of Oachira, where he spent his early years. He began his education at St. John's in Kayamkulam until the 3rd grade, after which he attended St. Pius X Convent in Kuttikkanam for a year. He later transferred to Chinmaya Vidyalaya, Thrissur, where he completed his high school education.

After high school, he returned to Kolkata and enrolled at South City College, where he earned a B.Com with honors. He then pursued an MBA in Finance at Alliance University in Bengaluru.

Professionally, he worked with Tata AIA Life and Dhanlaxmi Bank, eventually resigning from the latter in 2012.

== Career ==
Sanju Sivram made his silver screen debut with the Malayalam film Nee Ko Njaa Cha, directed by Gireesh. He has also acted in films like Bharya Athra Pora, 1983, Monsoon Mangoes, Beware of Dogs. His portrayal of the character Babukuttan was well appreciated in 2014 hit movie 1983.

Hello Namasthe. He played the male lead along with Vinay Forrt in the light hearted film Hello Namasthe, which revolves around the theme of friendship.

Sanju also appeared in a few short films, A Friday and Maniyara, The Chef . etc.

He made his debut in Telugu in 2018 with the movie Raktham – The Blood directed by Rajesh Touchriver, with whom he also did Telugu-Odiya bilingual Mindgame.

== Filmography ==
=== Films ===
Year	Title	Role	Notes
2013	Nee Ko Njaa Cha	Abu Hameed	
2013	Good Bad & Ugly	Anwar	
2013	Omege.exe	Nischal	
2013	Bharya Athra Pora	Anwar	
2014	1983	Babukuttan	
2014	100 Degree Celsius	Sreekkuttan	
2014	Beware of Dogs	Goutham	
2016	Hello Namasthe	RJ Jerry	
2016	Monsoon Mangoes	Koshy	
2017	Raktham	Anand	Telugu film
2017	Achayans	Rafi	
2017	Avarude Raavukal	Sanju	
2017	Villain	Shravan	
2017	Tharangam	Nandan	
2017	Masterpiece	Singer	
2018	Nonsense	Nisam	
2018	Oru Kuttanadan Blog	Sudhi	
2019	Rampunthanavaruthi	Jeevan	
2021	Varthamanam	Adarsh Chacko	
2021	Padmini	K Damodharan	
2022	Rorschach	Anil	
2022	Whine	Martin	
2022	Head master		
2022	Theru	Lalu	
2023	Purusha Pretham	Viswanath	
2023	Pachuvum Athbutha Vilakkum	Vivek	
2023	Higuita	Vinod	
2024	Partners	Krishnakumar	
2024	Ajayante Randam Moshanam	Constable Chandran	
2024	Manorathangal	Vincent	Anthology Series Segment : Kadalkkaattu ZEE5
2024	1000 Babies	Bibin Ouseph /Harshan/Naisam Ali	Web Series Disney+ Hotstar
2025	Aap Kaise Ho		
2025	The Chronicles of the 4.5 Gang	Arikuttan / Arun	Web Series SonyLIV
2026	Masthishka Maranam		
2026	Revolver Rinko		
2026	I, Nobody	Peter	
2026	Khalifa: The Ruler	Samad "Sami"	
2026	Prempaatta †	Akbar	
