= Thalavara =

2025 Indian-Malayalam language film

- Theatrical release poster
- Directed by: Akhil Anilkumar
- Written by: Akhil Anilkumar; Appu Aslam
- Story by: Akhil Anilkumar
- Produced by: Shebin Backer; Mahesh Narayanan
- Starring: Arjun Ashokan; Revathy Sarma
- Cinematography: Anurudh Aneesh
- Edited by: Rahul Radhakrishnan
- Music by: Electronic Kili; Vijay Anand
- Production companies: Shebin Backer Productions; Moving Narratives
- Distributed by: Central Pictures
- Release date: 22 August 2025
- Country: India
- Languages: Malayalam, Tamil

Thalavara (transl. Fate line) is a 2025 Indian Malayalam-language coming of age drama film directed by Akhil Anilkumar and written by Akhil Anilkumar and Appu Aslam. The film stars Arjun Ashokan and Revathy Sarma in the lead roles. It is produced by Shebin Backer under Shebin Backer Productions and Mahesh Narayanan under his banner Moving Narratives. Anurudh Aneesh handles the cinematography and Rahul Radhakrishnan edits the film. Electronic Kili composes the songs and background score.

Thalavara was released in India by Central Pictures on 22 August 2025. It received critical acclaim from critics.

== Cast ==
- Arjun Ashokan as Jyothish (Panda)
- Revathy Sarma as Sandhya
- Devadarshini as Asha, Jyothish and Jyothi's mother
- Ashokan as Kannappan, Jyothish's and Jyothi's father
- Sarath Sabha as Ganesh aka double
- Athira Mariyam as Jyothi, Jyothish's sister
- Abhiram Radhakrishnan as Shine, Assistant Director
- Shebin Benson as Subin Short Film Director
- Prasant Murali as Natural Star Vinayak Raj
- Sam Mohan as Vimal
- Harish Kumar as Krish
- Sohan Seenulal
- Shaju Sreedhar as Sandhya's father
- Vishnu Reghu as Sudheesh
- Muhammad Rafi as Kilavan
- Manoj Moses as Minnal
- Aswath Lal as Mahesh, Co Actor
- Amith Mohan Rajeswari as Navaneeth
- Naseer as Police Officer

== Production ==
Principal photography began on 3 June 2024. The filming wrapped on 24 November 2024.

== Soundtrack ==
Thalavara

Soundtrack album by: Electronic Kili; Vijayanand
- Released: 2025
- Recorded: 2024
- Studios: SKR Studios, EKM; Pop Media House, EKM
- Genre: Feature film soundtrack
- Length: 16:08
- Language: Malayalam
- Label: Think Music

The soundtrack album of the film is composed by Electronic Kili and Vijay Anand. Think Music procured the audio rights of the soundtrack. The first single Kand Kand was released on 30 July 2025. The second single Ilakozhiye was released on 9 August 2025. The third single Nila Nila teaser was released on 17 August 2025.

No.	Title	Lyrics	Music	Singer(s)	Length
1.	"Maare Maare"	Titto P Thankachen	Electronic Kili & Vishnu Das	Vishnu Das, Electronic Kili & Vijayanand	02:34
2.	"Nila Nila"	Titto P Thankachen	Vijayanand	Ananthu	02:34
3.	"Kand Kand"	Muthu	Electronic Kili	Manikandan Ayyappa & Electronic Kili	02:34
4.	"Ilakozhiye"	Muthu	Electronic Kili	Rakhoo, Sai Prabha	03:48
5.	"Kayamboo"	Muthu	Electronic Kili	Vijayanand & Dhaliya Navas	02:48
6.	"Swargathil Ethi"	Muthu	Electronic Kili	Electronic Kilil	02:32
Total length:					16:08

== Release ==
=== Theatrical ===
Thalavara is released on 22 August 2025.

=== Distribution ===
Central Pictures distributed the film in India.

== Reception ==
=== Critical response ===
Thalavara received critical acclaim from both audience and critics.

Sajin Shrijith of The Week gave 4/5 stars and wrote "Thalavara is one of the rare films that manages to be sweet without overwhelming us with its saccharine nature. A fresh, contemporary take on Beauty and the Beast, Thalavara is an unconventional hero's journey, or rather, the unconventional journey to becoming a hero who trumps conventions." Shilpa Nair Anand of The Hindu wrote, "Thalavara tugs at the heartstrings in unexpected little ways, gives hope, and, by the end of the film, leaves you a little teary-eyed."

Vivek Santhosh of Cinema Express gave 3.5/5 and wrote, "An earnest, family-friendly underdog drama elevated by Arjun Ashokan’s career-best performance as a man with vitiligo and Akhil Anilkumar’s sincere storytelling." Gopika I. S. of The Times of India gave 3/5 and wrote, "Thalavara is a slice-of-life film that explores personal growth, overcoming shame, building self-esteem, and more."
