= Paapam Cheyyathavar Kalleriyatte =

2020 Malayalam Film

- Directed by: Shambhu Purushothaman
- Written by: Shambhu Purushothaman
- Produced by: Sanju S. Unnithan
- Starring: Vinay Forrt; Tini Tom; Santhy Balachandran
- Cinematography: Jomon Thomas
- Edited by: Karthik Jogesh
- Music by: Prashant Pillai
- Production company: Spire Productions
- Distributed by: Spire Release
- Release date: 21 February 2020
- Running time: 117 minutes
- Country: India
- Language: Malayalam

Paapam Cheyyathavar Kalleriyatte (transl. Those that have not sinned, may cast stones) is a 2020 Indian Malayalam-language satirical film written and directed by Shambhu Purushothaman and produced by Sanju S. Unnithan. The film features an ensemble cast of Vinay Forrt, Tini Tom, Srinda Arhaan, Santhy Balachandran, Arun Kurian, Anumol, James Elias, Alencier Ley Lopez and Anil Nedumangad. The music was composed by Prashant Pillai and background score by Dawn Vincent. The film was Purushothaman's second directorial after Vedivazhipadu (2013).

== Plot ==
Christians believe that marriages are made in heaven. It is a satirical take on the belief, which is reinforced through marriage rituals, about the Christian marriage and the reality of it as seen around us. The title of the movie is an allusion to an utterance of Jesus in John 8:7, He that is without sin among you, let him first cast a stone at her.

Paapam Cheyyathavar Kalleriyatte begins with discussions between two seemingly rich and affluent Christian families. The conversations in the background distinctly show an arranged marriage being fixed and moves on to the topic of dowry. Rohan, who is said to have secured a prospective career at Google in the US, is set to marry Linda. Their families have arranged the alliance and Linda's parents have offered ₹10 crore as dowry. The groom's family forbids Rohan from communicating with Linda before marriage, and the couple hardly meet. Rohan's brother Roy is in a financial crisis and sees the marriage as the solution. But on the day of the betrothal, things take a turn for the worse when both families discover certain secrets.

== Cast ==
- Santhy Balachandran as Linda
- Srinda Arhaan as Susan Roy
- Anumol K. Manoharan as Lissy
- Ambika Mohan as Marykutty
- Madhupal as George
- Vinay Forrt as Roy
- Arun Kurian as Rohan
- Tini Tom as Alex
- Sunil Sukhada as Varghese Mathen a.k.a. Varkichen
- Alencier Ley Lopez as Xavier
- Anil Nedumangad as Rajan
- James Eliya as Umman Koshy
- Neena Kurup as Jancy
- Kochu Preman as Mathachan
- Narayanankutty as Sebastian
- Parvathi T. as Grace Amma
- Yavanika Gopalakrishnan as Ouseph
- Baby Sameksha
- Sameksha Nair
- Roshna Ann Roy as Angel
- Kottayam Pradeep
- Bobby Mohan as Michael
- Balaji Sharma
- Chekuthan
- Ambika Rao as Philomina
- Jolly Chirayath as Linda's mother
- Shiny T. Rajan
- Reshmi Anil
- Vishnu V Nair – Video archive from Pournami Thinkal
- Gauri Krishnan – Video archive from Pournami Thinkal

== Soundtrack ==
The songs in film were composed by Prashant Pillai and background score was done by Dawn Vincent.

== Release ==
The film was released on 21 February 2020. Streamed on Amazon Prime Video.
