= Djinn (2023 film) =

2023 Indian fantasy drama film

- Theatrical release poster
- Directed by: Sidharth Bharathan
- Screenplay by: Rajesh Gopinadhan
- Story by: Sidharth Bharathan
- Produced by: Sudheer VK; Manu Valiyaveetil
- Starring: Soubin Shahir; Sharaf U Dheen; Shine Tom Chacko; Santhy Balachandran; Leona Lishoy
- Cinematography: Girish Gangadharan
- Edited by: Deepu S. Joseph
- Music by: Prashant Pillai
- Production company: Straightline Cinemas
- Release date: 6 January 2023
- Running time: 133 minutes
- Country: India
- Language: Malayalam

Djinn is a 2023 Indian Malayalam-language fantasy drama film directed by Sidharth Bharathan and produced by Sudheer VK and Manu Valiyaveettil under the banner Straightline Cinemas. The film stars Soubin Shahir in the title role, alongside Sharaf U Dheen, Shine Tom Chacko, and Santhy Balachandran.

The screenplay and dialogues are written by Rajesh Gopinadhan. The music is composed by Prashant Pillai, while Girish Gangadharan handled the cinematographey and Deepu Joseph handled the editing.

== Cast ==
- Soubin Shahir as Lalappan
- Sharaf U Dheen as Sukesh / Django
- Shine Tom Chacko as Sudheep
- Santhy Balachandran as Safa
- Leona Lishoy as Thara Koshi
- Sabumon Abdusamad as Paul Kattukaran
- Jaffar Idukki as Aniyan Nair
- Nishanth Sagar as Anwar Ibrahim
- Sudheesh as Doctor
- K. P. A. C. Lalitha as Sulekha
- Smitha Ambu as Kaali
- Bhanumathi Payyanur as Malli

== Production ==
Filming was completed in March 2020.

== Music ==
The music for the film is composed by Prashant Pillai with lyrics written by Santhosh Varma and Anwar Ali.

== Reception ==
Anjana George, critic of Times of india, gave 3.5 out of 5 stars and wrote that, "Djinn is a movie for entertainment and after thoughts. Normality is an illusion. What's normal for a tiger is chaos for a deer." S.R. Parveen, critic of The Hindu, wrote that, "Despite few bright spots, fails in trying to do too many things." Sajin Shrijith, critic of Cinema Express, stated that, "Djinn may not be a flawless film, but it at least confirms my belief that Soubin delivers his best with the right directors." and gave 3 out of 5 stars.
