= Deepu Pradeep =

Indian script writer (born 1989)

- Education: B Tech, MES College of Engineering
- Occupation: Script Writer
- Years active: 2013–present
- Website: deepupradeep.com

Deepu Pradeep (born 12 November 1989) is an Indian script writer active in the Malayalam film industry.

== Career ==
Deepu began his career as a blogger in 2007 and has written various short stories on his blog. It was after reading one of the short stories that director Basil Joseph approached him for writing the screenplay for his debut movie.

By then he had already written the screenplay for two short films: Athekaranathaal and Unnimoolam. The screenplay for his first movie Kunjiramayanam was based on 5 short stories posted in his blog -Paathirathriyile Premam (2010), Salsamukku (2011), Just Married (2012), Cut Piece kuttan (2012), and Gundakal Karayaarilla (2013).

Following the success of his debut movie, he co-wrote The Priest with Shyam Menon and the movie was released in March 2021.

== Filmography ==
=== Short films ===
List of short film credits
Year	Title	Role	Language	Director	Notes
2013	Athekaranathal	script writer	Malayalam	Jeevaj Raveendran	
2014	Unnimoolam	script writer	Malayalam	Vipin Das	Starring Aju Varghese, Idavela Babu

=== Feature films ===
List of feature film credits
Year	Title	Role	Director	Notes
2015	Kunjiramayanam	script writer	Basil Joseph	Debut as a screenwriter
2021	The Priest	Screenplay & Dialogues	Jofin T Chacko	Co written with Shyam Menon
2023	Padmini	script writer	Senna Hegde	
2024	Guruvayoor Ambalanadayil	script writer	Vipin Das	
2024	ARM	Additional Screenplay	Jithin Lal	

=== Web Series ===
List of web series credits
Year	Title	Role	Language	Cast	Notes
2024	Perilloor Premier League	script writer	Malayalam	Nikhila Vimal, Sunny Wayne	
