= Randuper =

- Directed by: Prem Shankar
- Written by: Prem Shankar
- Produced by: Arunkumar
- Starring: Bipin Basil Paulose; Santhy Balachandran
- Cinematography: Narendar Ramanujam
- Edited by: Manoj Kannoth
- Music by: Gopi Sunder
- Release dates: December 2017 (IFFK); 3 December 2018
- Country: India
- Language: Malayalam

Randuper (Two people) is a 2017 Malayalam movie directed by Prem Shankar. The movie has Bipin Basil Paulose and Santhy Balachandran in the lead roles, with Suraj Venjaramood and Alencier making short appearances. The film was screened at the 22nd International Film Festival of Kerala in 2017 in the International Competition Category. The film had an OTT release in 2021.

== Plot synopsis ==
Two strangers Karun and Ria, both facing existential crisis have a chance encounter and end up spending a night together on the road.

== Cast ==
- Bipin Basil Paulose as Karun
- Santhy Balachandran as Ria
- Suraj Venjaramoodu
- Sunil Sukhada
- Alencier Ley Lopez
