= Kalliyankattu Neeli =

Indian folklore character

Kalliyankattu Neeli is a malevolent spirit (Yakshi) who appears in Kerala folk songs, Villadichan songs and folk tales of Travancore. Neeli also appears in Marthandavarma, CV Raman Pillai's historical novel. Even though she is a Yakshi (Ghost), Neeli is worshiped as a mother goddess in a temple in Panchavankaadu.

== Folklore narratives ==
One widely told narrative strand begins with a woman named Alli, described as the daughter of a devadasi named Karveni and living in Pazhakannoor. Alli marries a temple priest named Nambi, who is portrayed as exploitative and unfaithful. In the course of the conflict, Alli follows him while pregnant and is killed for her jewellery, commonly described as being struck against a stone. Her brother Ambi, who went looking for her also dies due to the grief of loss of his sister. Nambi is later said to die from a snakebite.

In the same narrative stream, Alli and Ambi are reborn as the children of a Chola king, Neelan and Neeli, and are associated with nocturnal cattle-killing and blood drinking. After the king believes the children to be the cause, he abandons them in a forest region often identified with Panchavankadu/Kalliyankadu near the southern border. Local leaders bring a ritual specialist who is able to destroy Neelan but is unable to stop Neeli, who retaliates.

The story culminates with Neeli pursuing and killing a man named Anandan, described as a reincarnation of her husband, and with the deaths of villagers who attempt to protect him. After this, Neeli is described in some tellings as ceasing to roam and instead residing at a fixed place (sometimes described as beneath a tree), gradually becoming understood as a motherly guardian figure.

=== Literary retellings ===
A prominent literary variant appears in C. V. Raman Pillai's 1891 historical novel Marthandavarma, in which Neeli is killed at Panchavankadu and she resurrects as a yakshi for supernatural vengeance.

== Association with Kadamattathu Kathanar ==
Some narrative clusters connect Neeli to Kadamattathu Kathanar (a priest-magician figure in Kerala folklore). In these versions, Neeli is described as being ritually subdued by binding her to a stone, with the outcome that the surrounding area becomes safe again. Kathanar-linked versions have been amplified through modern popular culture and screen retellings.

== Worship ==
In Parumala Valiya Panayannarkavu Bhagavathy Temple, Pathanamthitta, Neeli has a shrine and devotees offer black glass bangles.

== Popular culture ==
- A Malayalam horror film Kalliyankattu Neeli (1979), portrays Neeli as the main character.
- Kalliyankattu Neeli appears in the 1984 Malayalam horror film, Kadamattathachan.
- Kalliyankattu Neeli appears in the Malayalam supernatural drama television series, Kadamattathu Kathanar, portrayed by Sukanya.
- A poem written by Ezhacherry Ramachandran about Kalliyankattu Neeli is called Neeli.
- In the superhero film Lokah Chapter 1: Chandra, Kalyani Priyadarshan portrays Neeli who lives in 2025 under pseudonym Chandra.
