= Sarath Sabha =

Indian actor

- Born: Palakkad, Kerala, India
- Occupation: Actor
- Years active: 2017 – present

Sarath Sabha is an Indian actor who works in Malayalam cinema. His film credits include Iratta (2023), Kannur Squad (2023) and Lokah Chapter 1: Chandra (2025).

== Career ==
Sabha has played supporting roles in Malayalam films and web series. In Pookkaalam (2023) he appeared as a young priest. He was part of the ensemble cast of Kannur Squad, starring Mammootty, and appeared in Iratta, starring Joju George.

In 2024 he appeared in Kadakan and in the Hotstar web series Perilloor Premier League. In 2025 he was part of the cast of Lokah Chapter 1: Chandra.

== Filmography ==
=== Film ===
Year	Title	Role	Ref.
2017	Tharangam	Appukuttan	
2018	Odiyan		
2019	Mr. & Ms. Rowdy	Maniyan	
2021	Moral Nights		
2021	Malik	Aji	
2021	Jan.E.Man	Kannan, Saji's sidekick	
2022	Freedom Fight	Young Union Leader	
2022	Jaya Jaya Jaya Jaya Hey	Santhosh, Rajesh's poultry worker	
2023	Iratta	Sabu	
2023	Pookkaalam	Father Gabriel, Elsamma's son	
2023	Corona Dhavan	Sumesh	
2023	Kannur Squad	Vinod Kollattu	
2024	Vivekanandan Viralanu	Joppan	
2024	Kadakan		
2025	Thalavara	Ganesh aka double	
2025	Lokah Chapter 1: Chandra	Sundar	
2025	Nellikkampoyil Night Riders	Rajesh	
2026	Kanimangalam Kovilakam		

=== Web series ===
Year	Title	Role	Platform	Ref.
2024	Perilloor Premier League	Ambareesh	Hotstar	
