= Hello Namasthe =

- Theatrical release poster
- Directed by: Jayan K. Nair
- Screenplay by: Krishna Poojappura
- Produced by: Freemu Varghese
- Starring: Vinay Forrt; Bhavana; Sanju Sivram; Miya; Aju Varghese; Mukesh; Joju George; Soubin Shahir
- Narrated by: Suraj Venjaramoodu
- Cinematography: P.Sukumar ISC
- Edited by: Ayoob Khan
- Music by: Gopi Sundar
- Production company: Freedia Entertainment
- Distributed by: Murali Films
- Release date: 19 February 2016
- Running time: 123 minutes
- Country: India
- Language: Malayalam

Hello Namasthe is a 2016 Indian Malayalam-language comedy film directed by Jayan K. Nair and written by Krishna Poojappura. It tells the story of two modern-day couples as they find themselves at crossroads over a jackfruit tree that stands between their villas. It stars Vinay Forrt, Bhavana, Sanju Sivram, and Miya. Hello Namasthe was released on 19 February 2016.

== Plot ==
The story starts with two young radio jockeys (RJs), Madhav (Vinay Forrt) and Jerry (Sanju Sivram). They both work as hosts for a radio show called Hello Namasthe. Jerry was invited to his ex-girlfriend Anna's (Miya) wedding. She was going to wed a man named Pappu Joseph Thadikkaran (Aju Varghese). Jerry goes with Madhav and Abu (Soubin Shahir). Jerry, Madhav and Abu meet her groom, but they don't like him, his two friends persuade Jerry to ask Anna to go with them and Anna agrees. They drop Abu at his house and Madhav, Jerry, and Anna go to Madhav's house. There they meet Madhav's wife, Priya (Bhavana), who is obsessed with cleanliness (a kind of Obsessive-Compulsive Disorder). Jerry and Anna decide to get married. After that, they all move to a colony of villas. In the colony, a Jackfruit tree between their houses creates a fight between them. How they try to defeat each other forms the rest of the story.

== Cast ==
- Vinay Forrt as RJ Madhav
- Sanju Sivram as RJ Jerry
- Bhavana as Priya
- Miya as Anna
- Aju Varghese as Pappu Joseph Thadikkaran
- Joju George as Jayamohan
- Soubin Shahir as Abu
- Mukesh as Tomichayan
- Muthumani as Shahida
- P Balachandran as Kuriachan Achayan
- KPAC Lalitha as Alice
- Akshara Kishor as Amina
- Kottayam Pradeep as Mohanan
- Seema G Nair as Mohanan's wife
- Hareesh Perumanna as Rameshan
- Sethulakshmi as Shobha
- Krishna Prasad as Musthafa
- Remya as Neena
- Swapna as Tessa
- Nelson as Tree cutter

== Music ==
Hello Namasthe

Soundtrack album

The soundtrack was released by Satyam Audios in December 2015 with songs composed by Masala Coffee and Deepankuran and lyrics written by Kaithapram and Anil Panachooran.

No.	Title	Lyrics	Singer(s)	Length
1.	"Ulakil Karanamilla"	Anil Panachooran	Masala Coffee	04:30
2.	"Kandu Kothiche"	Kaithapram	Vijay Yesudas	04:08

== Reception ==
=== Critical reception ===
Paresh C Palicha of Rediff.com gave the film a rating of 3.5 out of 5 and said, "the premise of the film may be very old, but the sincere effort of the entire cast makes it watchable." Deepa Soman of The Times of India gave the film a rating of 2.5 out of 5 and wrote "Hello Namasthe attempts to present a two-hour film out of this naive, puerile situation, by placing some good actors to deal with the emerging staid settings and silly conversations. ... The plot is hardly convincing and is the sorest chord in the whole film. Yes, a jackfruit tree as the central character is something novel, but translating that thought into an entertaining film calls for some brilliant, non-clichéd packaging, characterisations and a sensibly engaging screenplay, all of which are absent in Hello Namasthe. The end of the passable drama is also boringly predictable."
