= Kadamattathu Kathanar =

Indian karhanar

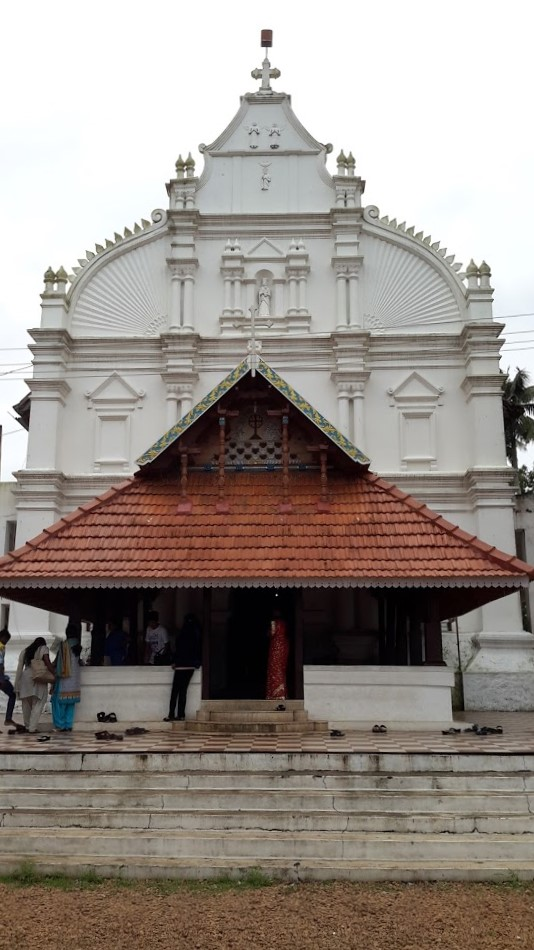
Kadamattom Church in Ernakulam district, Kerala

Kadamattathu Kathanar was a kathanar (priest) who, according to legends, possessed magical powers. He was an ordained deacon of Kadamattom Church in the 4th century, in Kadamattam near Kolenchery in Ernakulam district, Kerala. According to legends, his real name was Poulose and he was the disciple of bishop Mar Abo. The church's history is undocumented, surviving solely through local legends. The tales surrounding Kathanar encapsulate the experiences of the local populace, conveyed through elements of magic and sorcery. These tales portray him as a priest with supernatural powers, employed for the common good.

== Historicity ==
In medieval legends, history and fables were combined inextricably. The story of Kadamattathu Kathanar might be a mixture of history and fables. Currently there is no certain proof that he really existed, but the fact that a real priest lived in that area in the ninth century cannot be denied. History points out the existence of Christians in the area from around 2nd or 3rd century of the Christian Era.

== Legends ==
Poulose, later known as Kathanar, was born to a poor family in Kadamattom, a small village in North Travancore (now part of Kerala). People fondly called him Kochu Poulose. He had no siblings and his parents died when he was a child. He was taken care of by his mother for a short period before her death, after which he came under the patronage of the Persian priest Mar Abo (also known as Mar Sabor).

Poulose was given a good education under Abo. The priest taught him Syriac and Liturgy of the Mass. In due course he was ordained as a deacon and people began to call him deacon Poulose.

Mar Sabor the bishop who ordained him as a priest left from Kadamattom after the arrival of Paulose. The Bishop built many churches. Sabor settled at Thevalakkara.

Some stories of Kathanar are presented in the collection of legends, Aithihyamala.

== Gallery ==
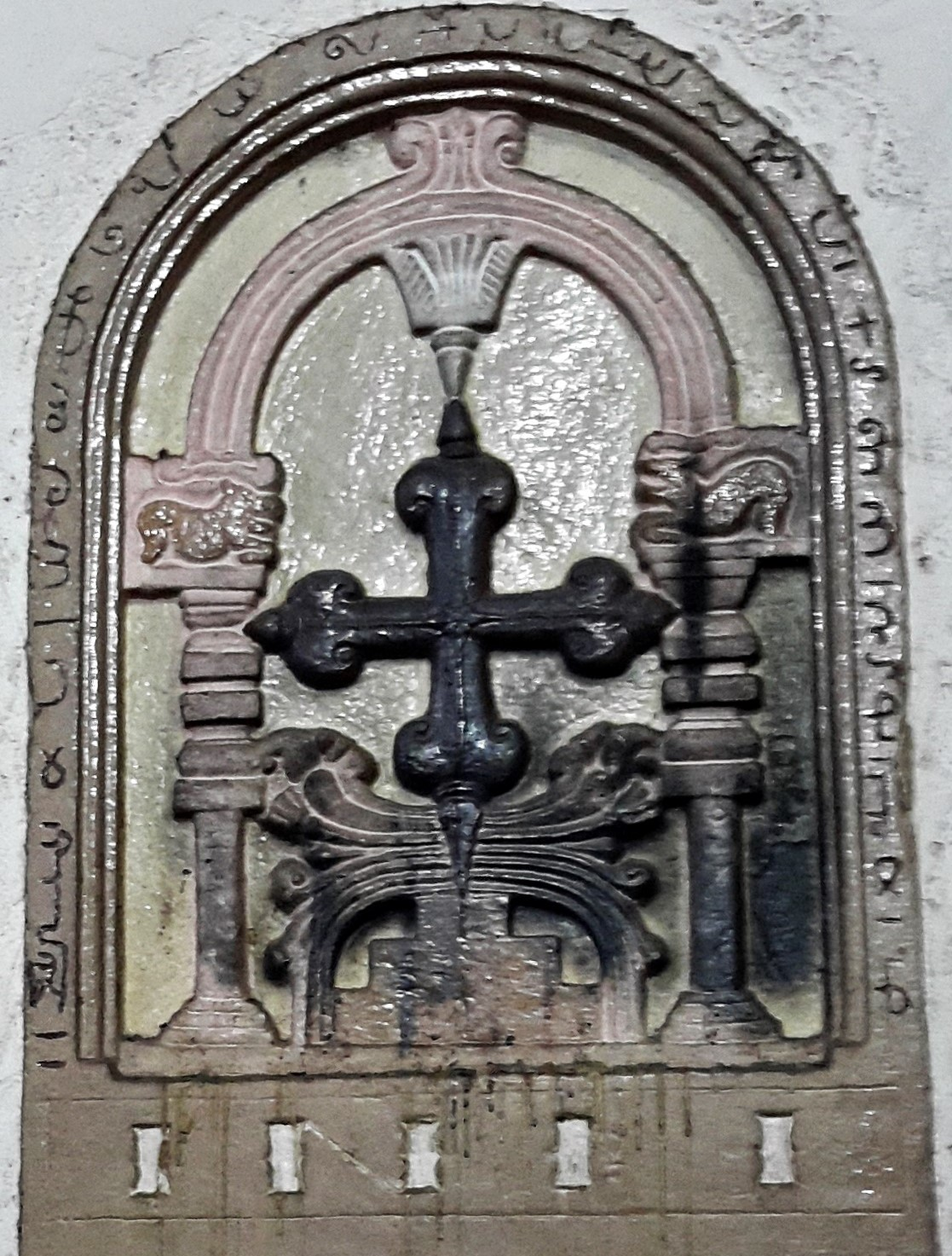
Famous Persian Cross- front view

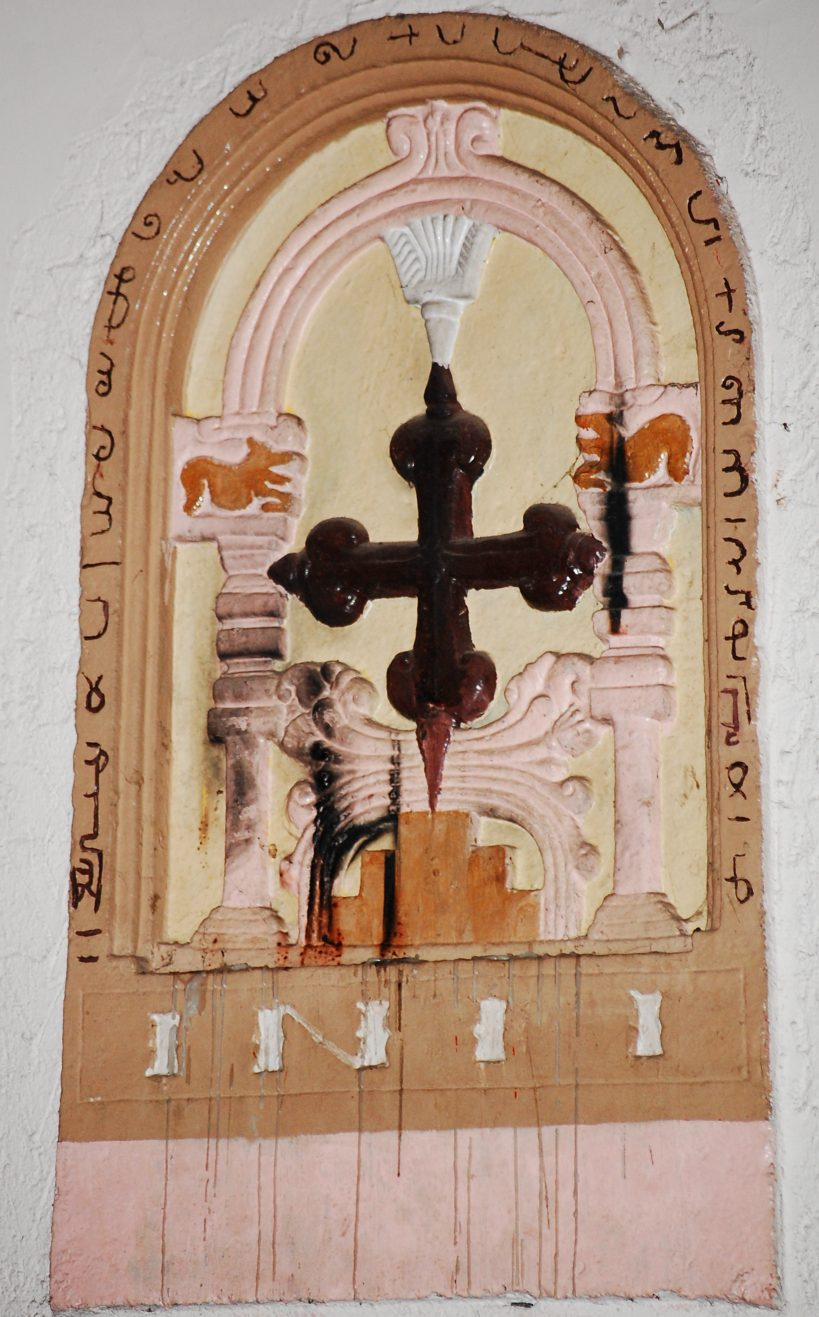
Persian Cross-side view

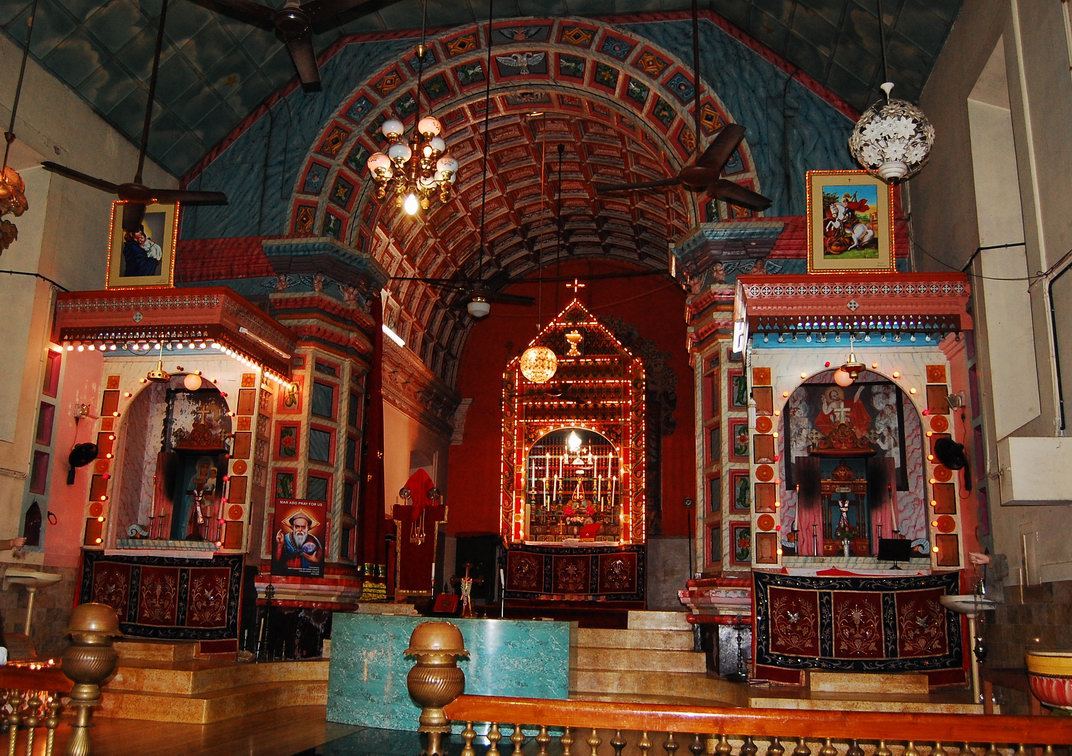
Altar of the church

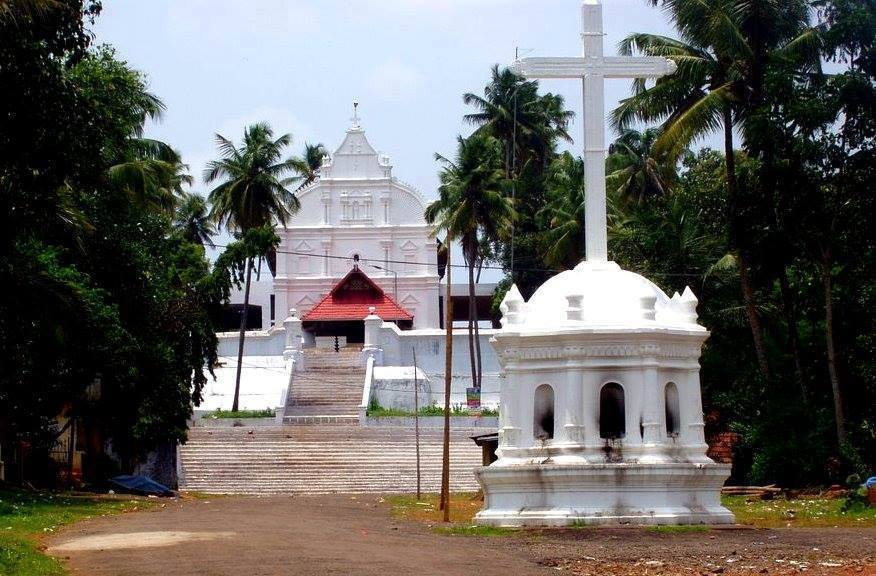
External view of the church

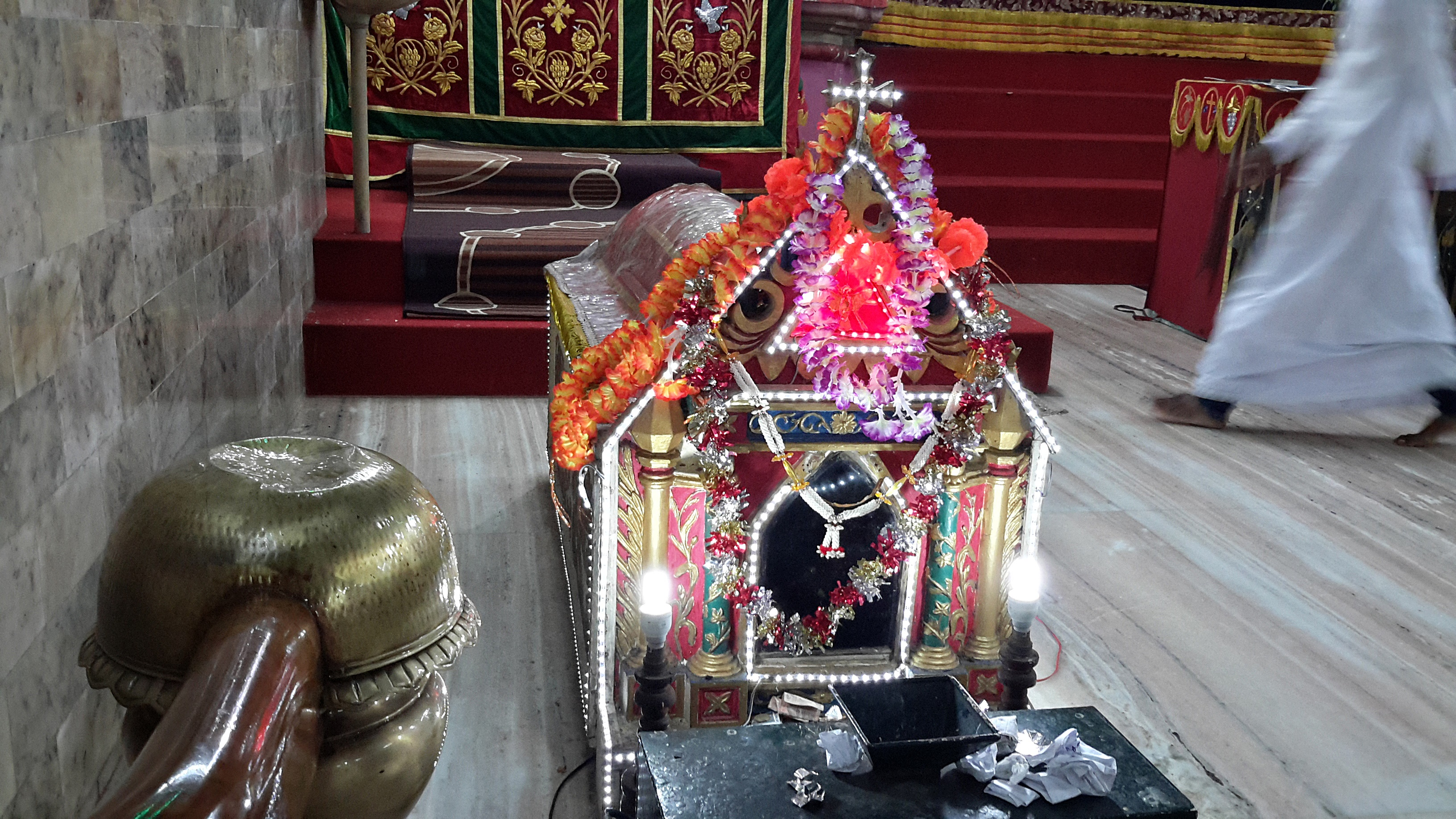
Tomb of Marthoma IX

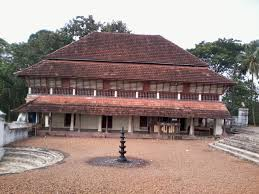
Bishops rest room built in the late 1940s or earlier

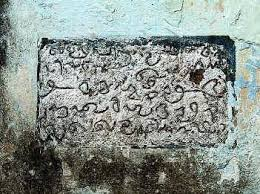
Unknown inscription on the wall of the church

== In popular culture ==
- In the 1966 film Kadamattathachan, Thikkurissy Sukumaran Nair played the lead role.
- In the 1984 film Kadamattathachan, Prem Nazir played the lead role.
- A TV series Kadamattathu Kathanar was telecast on Asianet in which Prakash Paul played Kathanar.
- A TV series was produced by Jai Hind and Surya TV titled Kadamattathachan. Prakash Paul played the title role in both.
- In the film Meghasandesam, Napoleon plays the role of a descendant of Kadamattathu Kathanar.
- In the 2025 superhero film Lokah Chapter 1: Chandra, Sunny Wayne portrays Kathanar.
- In the upcoming film Kathanar – The Wild Sorcerer, Jayasurya portrays Kathanar.

== See also ==
- Kottarathil Sankunni
- Yakshi
- Kalliyankattu Neeli
