= ARM (film) =

2024 Malayalam film by Jithin Lal

- Theatrical release poster
- Directed by: Jithin Laal
- Written by: Sujith Nambiar
- Additional screenplay: Deepu Pradeep
- Produced by: Listin Stephen; Zachariah Thomas
- Starring: Tovino Thomas; Basil Joseph; Krithi Shetty; Surabhi Lakshmi; Aishwarya Rajesh
- Narrated by: Mohanlal
- Cinematography: Jomon T. John
- Edited by: Shameer Muhammed
- Music by: Dhibu Ninan Thomas
- Production companies: Magic Frames; UGM Entertainment
- Distributed by: Magic Frames
- Release date: 12 September 2024
- Running time: 142 minutes
- Country: India
- Language: Malayalam
- Budget: ₹30 crore
- Box office: est. ₹107.77 crore

A.R.M (officially titled: Ajayante Randam Moshanam; transl. Ajayan's Second Theft) is a 2024 Indian Malayalam-language action adventure fantasy film directed by Jithin Laal (in his directorial debut), written by Sujith Nambiar, and produced by Magic Frames and UGM Entertainment. The film stars Tovino Thomas in triple roles alongside Basil Joseph, Krithi Shetty (in her Malayalam debut), Surabhi Lakshmi, Aishwarya Rajesh, Kabir Duhan Singh, Harish Uthaman, Jagadish, Aju Varghese, Biju Kuttan, Rohini, Shivajith, and Sudheesh in prominent roles.

The film was originally shot in 2D format and converted to 3D. ARM was theatrically released on 12 September 2024 coinciding with the Onam festival. The film received positive reviews from critics. Made on a budget of ₹30 crore, the film became a commercial success grossing ₹106.75 crore at the box office, becoming one of the highest-grossing Malayalam films of all time.

== Plot ==
The movie begins with a grandmother reciting a bed time story to her granddaughter about the lore of Chyothivilaku. Chyothivilaku is a sacred lamp which was made from a melted mixture of an asteroid which once crashed in the land of Haripuram during ancient times. The lamp was commanded to be made from the asteroid by the Edakkal King at the time, who takes it to his palace owing to its supernatural powers. During the invasion of Pulimutt Mammadh and his thugs in the land, the scared King calls upon a warrior from Haripuram called KunjiKelu Nayanar - known popularly as Kunjikelu - to help save his citizens and his nephew Mana Varma, the heir apparent. Kunjikelu waged a one-man war against thugs at the seashore and achieved victory. After his victory over the thugs, Kunjikelu requests the Chyothivilaku as a gift. The king agrees and Kunjikelu brings it to Haripuram.

Kunjikelu is romantically interested in Chothi, a woman from a lower caste. He promises Chothi on building a temple and so that the lamp is accessible to everyone without discrimination. Meanwhile smallpox spreads across Haripuram. An affected Chothi on the brink of death is saved by Kunjikelu. Chothi survives while Kunjikelu gets affected. During his bed rest, he receives a secret letter from Mana Varma which breaks his heart. Kunjikelu learns that even though he wanted the temple to have no discrimination, no one from the lower caste is allowed into the temple. Seeing all the distress, Kunjikelu dies. The grandmother ends the story by describing how their village came to be known as Chyothikkavu. The granddaughter asks if Chothi was pregnant and she dismisses the thought and that Chothi had left for Nagercoil after her recovery from smallpox.

Maniyan was a crooked yet sharp robber who ends up stealing the Chyothivilaku but dies by the hands of the villagers.

In the 1990s, M. V. Ajayan (Maniyan's grandson) is an electrician who is secretly in love with Chathutti Nambiar's daughter, Lakshmi. He is carrying the weight of his grandfather Maniyan's unfavourable image as a thief and the villagers mostly insult him for being from a thief's family. His first and only theft was a bunch of keys when he was young as a playful act but was returned after advice from his grandmother and mother. His friend K. P. Suresh stands up for him during the tough times. He finds himself in a difficult situation when a stranger, Sudev shows up unexpectedly on their land posing as a photographer with the intention of stealing the Chyothivilaku and sell it off to the British archives. Suresh, under the orders of Sudev, traps Ajayan and himself. Sudev reveals that the Chyothivilaku in the temple is fake and is banking on Ajayan's skill to find the real Chyothivilaku before the temple festival. He searches all possible places near Chyothikkavu but fails miserably. Lakshmi asks him to check places where a man such as Maniyan and only Maniyan could get into. He reaches a hillside and goes inside a cave near a waterfall, and finds cave paintings on the walls.

Years ago, Maniyan went into hiding. The townspeople brought Nanjappa Chowta, a police inspector, to help catch him. Furious at the fact that Maniyan was nowhere to be seen, Nanjappa misbehaves with Maniyan's wife, Manikyam. Maniyan beats up Nanjappa and asks him if it was the thief or the police who came first. Maniyan, saddened by the state of his wife, plans to steal the Chyothivilakku to prove to the townspeople that Manikyam's dignity is greater than the lamp the townspeople worship so dearly, and when he does, he goes into the cave which Ajayan went to years after, and announces his win over the townspeople. But Naanu, a blacksmith and a descendant of Thekkumpadan Kollan, tells him that this is not the real Chyothivilakku. It is revealed that the letter which Kunjikelu received informed him that the Chyothivilakku was a fake one. Maniyan then plans to find the real one and sets off to the royal palace.

After getting through various traps and obstacles, Maniyan finds the lamp and brings both of them to Manikyam, and claims that he will bring the fake lamp to the temple, where it was kept and worshipped. On the way, he is trapped and the townspeople, enraged by the fact that he tried to steal the lamp, try to kill him. Nanjappa tells Maniyan that he was right, thieves came first, but police were created to fight them. They chase him up a mountain, and the villagers corner him at a cliff near the waterfall. He refuses to give up the lamp but they threaten him with his wife and daughter. He puts the fake lamp back down and he lets himself go and falls into the waterfall, leading to his death.

In the present, Ajayan agrees to participate in a Kalaripayattu competition, but fails at the last minute under the orders of Sudev. Since he was unable to find the lamp, he plans to run away. He goes to Chathutti Nambiar's house to meet Lakshmi and run away, but gets locked in a room and is trapped by Chathutti Nambiar. He manages to escape with the help of their caretaker but gets chased by the villagers into the same hillside where his grandfather also fell to his death. They have showed in past Maniyan and Naanu were discussing about the plan after hiding the lamp, at that moment Naanu informed he is immortal hence Maniyan is also immortal. Ajayan also falls to the waterfall, but instead of dying as said by Naanu, he survives and finds the lamp by using a key (resembling a tortoise) which his mother gave him days prior for searching the lamp, thinking it would prove useful. After a brief confrontation with Sudev and his cronies, Ajayan beats up Sudev and the original lamp is returned to Chyothikkavu. Ajayan goes to find Lakshmi and the movie ends with him riding along the car in which Lakshmi was ordered to be taken away by her father, suggesting Ajayan's second theft was nothing but his true love.(Ajayan's Second Theft is shown on the screen after this.)

A final scene shows Maniyan overlooking Chyothikaavu as a pillar of light erupts from it, suggesting that Maniyan survived after all, and that he might have been the one who saved Ajayan as well.

== Cast ==
Adapted from the closing credits:

- Tovino Thomas in triple roles as:
  - Neeliyathu Kunjikelu Nayanar, Ajayan's and Maniyan's ancestor and Warrior
  - Maniyan, Ajayan's grandfather, Kunjikelu's descendant and thief
  - Ajayan, Maniyan's Grandson ,Kunjikelu's descendant and electrician
    - Sreerang as Young Ajayan
- Basil Joseph as K. P. Suresh, Ajayan's best friend and thief
- Krithi Shetty as Lakshmi, Ajayan's love interest (voice dubbed by Mamitha Baiju)
  - Anvi as young Lakshmi
- Surabhi Lakshmi as Manikyam, Maniyan's wife and Ajayan's grandmother
- Aishwarya Rajesh as Chothi, Kunjikelu's love interest (cameo appearance)
- Harish Uthaman as Sudev Varma
- Jagadish as Kollan Naanu, Maniyan's confidant and friend
- Aju Varghese as SI T.A Saifudheen
- Sanju Sivram as Constable Chandran
- Biju Kuttan as Kuttappan, Chathutty's helper
- Rohini as Sarojam, Maniyan's daughter and Ajayan's mother
- Madhupal as Edakkal Rajavu
- Pramod Shetty as CI Nanjappa Chowta
- Nisthar Sait as Chathutty Nambiar, Lakshmi's father
  - Shivaraj as Young Chathutty
- Santhosh Keezhattoor as Paramu Nambiar, Chathutty's father and Lakshmi's grandfather
- Shivajith as Kavumbayi Sudhakaran
- Jitin Puthenchery as Felix, Sudev's friend
- Nihal as Antony, Sudev's Friend
- Sudheesh as Chandu Nair, K. P. Suresh's father
- Nirmal Palazhi as Bhaskaran
- Aneesh Gopal as Chegu Babu
- Kabir Duhan Singh as Pulimutt Mammadh
- Jithin Laal as Mana Varma, Edakkal Rajavu's nephew
- Parvathi T. as Chathutty's mother and Lakshmi's grandmother
- Mohanlal as Cosmic Creator (Voice only)
- Vikram as Cosmic Creator (Voice only; Tamil Version)
- Chiranjeevi as Cosmic Creator (Voice only; Telugu Version)
- Shiva Rajkumar as Cosmic Creator (Voice only; Kannada Version)
- R Madhavan as Cosmic Creator (Voice only; Hindi Version)

== Production ==
=== Development ===
On 1 January 2020, coinciding with New Year's, Tovino Thomas officially announced through his social media pages that he would collaborate with Jithin Laal for an upcoming film, Ajayante Randam Moshanam. Tovino will be seen in triple role for the first time as Maniyan, Ajayan and Kunjikelu; characters from three different timelines; 1900, 1950, and 1990. The film is the debut of Jithin Lal who has been part of Malayalam cinema for the past few years assisting in several films. The project would be funded by UGM Entertainment and written by Sujith Nambiar. Touted to be a periodic film, Ajayante Randam Moshanam will be shot in Kerala.

According to Jithin Laal, ARM took him six years to make taking inspirations from fantasy fiction, folktales, and children's stories. He mentioned some of the earlier Malayalam films in similar genre such as My Dear Kuttichathan, Sakshal Shreeman Chathunni, and Ananthabadram which explores fictional world. Sujith Nambiar wrote the script with additional writing by Deepu Pradeep as they developed it during the COVID pandemic. Tovino revealed that, "ARM was a story that got us excited way back in 2017 and faced delays in taking off in the way they were meant to." He learned Kalarippayatt and horseback riding to portraying his roles.

The technical team consists of cinematographer Jomon T John, music director Dhibu Ninan Thomas, and editor Shameer Muhammed. Mohanlal gave the voice role of cosmic creator.

=== Casting ===
In August 2022 Krithi Shetty was reported to play the leading lady in the film who is making her Malayalam cinema debut. Aishwarya Rajesh and Surabhi Lakshmi have been cast as the other female leads. Rohini, Harish Uthaman, Pramod Shetty, Basil Joseph and Hareesh Peradi were cast to play important roles.

=== Filming ===
It began filming on 11 October 2022 with a planned schedule of 125 days. The makers revealed that around 45 days would be allotted for shooting fight sequences that are mostly Kalari-oriented. The second schedule of the film commenced in Cheruvathur in Kasaragod with Krithi Shetty joining the set. Filming was wrapped up on 11 March 2023, lasting 118 days. Majority of the film's shooting took place in Kasaragod, Kerala. The film was originally shot in 2D format which was converted to 3D. The film was made on a budget of ₹30 crore.

== Music ==
The songs and background score of the film were composed by Dhibu Ninan Thomas. The first single "Kiliye" was released on 2 September 2024. The second single "Angu Vaana Konilu" was released on the occasion of Onam, 14 September. The album was released through Think Music on 26 September.

== Release ==
=== Theatrical ===
ARM was released in theatres worldwide on 12 September 2024 in both 3D and 2D formats.

=== Home media ===
The film began streaming on Disney+ Hotstar from 8 November 2024.

== Reception ==
=== Critical response ===
Rohit Panikker of Times Now gave 4/5 stars and wrote, "Ajayante Randam Moshanam is a visual spectacle supported by some masterful story-telling. If not anything, the film is worth it for its performances from all quarters, but most of all, as a story-telling vehicle that has taken Tovino Thomas the performer up a few notches. The film is an excellent theatre-watching experience that you can hope for from a festival release". Christy Rosy Sibi of The Week gave 4/5 stars and wrote, "Tovino should take on more menacing, villain roles". Anna Mathews of The Times of India gave 3.5/5 stars and wrote, "Ajayante Randam Moshanam could be like another one of those impressive films that have come out of the Malayalam industry - which is currently ailing from several issues driven by the Hema Committee report - but does it have that emotional hook to pull in audiences is a question that we will have to wait and watch out for". Goutham S of Pinkvilla gave 3.5/5 stars and wrote, "Ajayante Randam Moshanam aka ARM is surely not a commercial cinema that is filled with crazy elements or fanfare. However, the film provides a tale of action and adventure which is mixed with myth and folklore". Anandu Suresh of The Indian Express gave 3.5/5 stars and wrote, "Dhibu Ninan Thomas's background score stands out, especially in the mass-appeal moments, though his songs are not all equally memorable. Gokuldas's production design, Praveen Varma's costume design and Ronex Xavier's makeup also deserve recognition for their contributions". Vignesh Madhu of Cinema Express gave 3.5/5 stars and wrote, "It is precisely why ARM is that much-needed breath of fresh air from Malayalam's overpopulated realistic dramas and generic thrillers".

Janani K of India Today gave 2.5/5 stars and wrote, "ARM intriguingly blends folklore and action. However, the screenplay has some shortcomings that prevent it from fully conveying the intended message". Kirubhakar Purushothaman of News18 gave 2.5/5 stars and wrote, "In Ranjith's film, the coveted object is gold; in ARM, it's the lamp. Both symbolize what is denied to the oppressed. It's interesting how both Ranjith and Jithin Lal use fantasy as a genre to delve into this topic. If only Ajayante Randam Moshanam was as captivating as its concept.

S. R. Praveen of The Hindu wrote, "Despite the underwhelming writing, Jithin Lal gives us a hint of his craft with a visually impressive drama. And yes, the film belongs to Tovino". Swathi P Ajith of Onmanorama wrote, "The film benefits from a well-balanced blend of genres, incorporating magic, supernatural elements, folktales, history, and romance, all mixed together in perfect harmony. The film is a must-watch for those seeking a dynamic performance and is perfectly suited for the big screen experience". Latha Srinivasan of Hindustan Times wrote, "Technically, the cinematography by Jomon T John stands out but the songs by Dhibu Ninan Thomas don't. Thomas’ BGM however did work well in the film. Tovino Thomas shines in ARM but the execution is, unfortunately, flawed".

=== Piracy issues ===
On 17 September 2024, the director of the film Jithin Lal, shared a video of a man watching the pirated version of the film in train through his Facebook page criticising the piracy. Following this on 19 September 2024, Kerala Police registered a case regarding the incident.

== Future ==
In an interview, the director Jithin Lal revealed that the makers are planning to expand the universe of ARM and the script writer Sujith Nambiar developed a concept of nine spin-off films.

== Accolades ==
Year	Award	Category	Recipient	Ref.
2024	Kerala Film Critics Association Awards	Best Actor	Tovino Thomas	
2024	Kerala Film Critics Association Awards	Best Popular Film	Jithin Laal	
2024	Kerala Film Critics Association Awards	Best Female Playback Singer	Vaikom Vijayalakshmi	
2024	Kerala Film Critics Association Awards	Best Art Director	A. V. Gokuldas	
2024	55th Kerala State Film Awards	Best Visual Effects	Jithin Lal; Albert Thomas; Anirudha Mukherjee; Salim Lahiri	
2024	55th Kerala State Film Awards	Best Male Singer ("Kiliye")	K. S. Harisankar	
2024	55th Kerala State Film Awards	Best Actor (Special Mention)	Tovino Thomas	
2024	72nd National Film Awards	Best Female Playback Singer	Vaikom Vijayalakshmi	
