= Kadamattathu Kathanar (TV series) =

Indian supernatural drama television series

- Genre: Drama; Supernatural; Fantasy; Thriller
- Written by: Shaji Nedunkallel
- Story by: T. S. Suresh Babu
- Directed by: T. S. Saji
- Starring: See below
- Opening theme: "Maanthrikan Maha Maanthrikan Keerthithan Sahayaathrikan"
- Ending theme: "Kathanaar Kathanaar Kadamattathu Kathanaar"
- Country of origin: India
- Original language: Malayalam
- No. of seasons: 1
- No. of episodes: 255

Production
- Producer: Subramaniam Karthikeyan
- Production location: Kerala
- Production companies: Sree Subramaniam Enterprises; Merryland Studio

Original release
- Network: Asianet
- Release: 15 March 2004 – 11 February 2005

Kadamattathu Kathanar is an Indian Malayalam-language supernatural drama television series that originally aired on Asianet from 2004 to 2005, with Prakash Paul portraying the title character of Kathanar. The series was rebroadcast on Asianet Plus beginning in March 2016.

== Synopsis ==
Kadamattathu Kathanar, also known as Kadamattathachan ("Father of Kadamattom"), was a legendary 9th-century Oriental Syriac priest of the Kadamattom Church, one of the oldest surviving churches in Kerala associated with the Saint Thomas Christians.

Kathanar was said to have learned sorcery from a mysterious source and to have possessed supernatural powers. However, it was more generally believed that Kathanar performed most of his feats through divine power, invoking the Holy Spirit through prayer and thereby making him invulnerable to other sorcerers.

The series portrays his exorcisms of ghosts and evil spirits, including the well-known legend of Kalliyankattu Neeli, a vampiric Yakshi that haunted a Kerala family who sought Kathanar’s help.

== Plot ==
=== Story 1: The saga of Kalliyankattu Neeli (Episodes 1–21, 25–27) ===
The traditional Vamanam Tharavadu family in Kerala is terrorized by Neeli, a powerful Yakshi with multiple forms and abilities far exceeding those of ordinary spirits. After several family members are killed and the village is thrown into fear, Kathanar arrives, subdues Neeli, and compels her to recount her past. Moved by her story, he shows compassion and establishes her as a local demi-goddess, granting her an opportunity for earthly redemption.

=== Story 2: War with Chadayan (Episodes 20–44) ===
Chadayan, a student and adopted son of Lada Guru, turns evil under the influence of the sorceress Durgamma. He gains power by murdering his guru, imprisoning his son Nathan, and seizing a collection of 13 ancient grimoires said to promise godlike powers through ritual sacrifices. Kathanar ultimately defeats Chadayan in a prolonged battle, leaving him blinded as his castle collapses around him. Chadayan’s patron demigod later reappears and restores his sight.

=== Story 3: The saga of Kumkumathu Kovilakam (Episodes 43–51) ===
The historic Kumkumathu Kovilakam is haunted by a murderous evil spirit which plays upon deep desires and fears until Kathanar arrives and exorcises the ghost.

=== Story 4: Bhanu's tricky game of pakida (Episodes 51–59) ===
Bhanu, a courtesan and wealthy mistress of Ettukettu, challenges suitors to defeat her in a game of dice known as pakida as a condition for winning her favor. Using a pair of enchanted dice that obey her will even after being cast she ensnares many men into servitude through her beauty and deception. Kathanar eventually arrives and defeats Bhanu, breaking her hold over the victims.

=== Story 5: Kulamanamadathil Potti against Kathanar (Episodes 59–66) ===
Potti takes Bhanu into his own home and asks her to live in harmony with his other three wives, assuring her that he will destroy Kathanar. He sends a demon girl and a male ghost to Kadamattom but both are destroyed by Kathanar, who then goes to Potti's house as a guest. Potti tries to insult him in many ways but Kathanar counsels both Potti and Bhanu, who seek his forgiveness.

=== Story 6: Odiyan's killing spree (Episodes 66–68) ===
People in Kuravanmedu village have been attacked and killed by Odiyan, a spirit who can transform into a bull. Kathanar subdues Odiyan, ending the terrorising of the village of Kuravanmedu.

=== Story 7: The hauntings of Vadakkan Veedu (Episodes 68–79) ===
Untimely deaths of the Vadakkan Veedu family's young children occur after an evil entity is freed from its confinement. Upon investigation Kathanar finds out that the entity was the spirit of Thirumala, who was killed by the previous head of Vadakkan Veedu along with her father and a snake charmer. Though empathetic, Kathanar warns Thirumala not to trouble Vadakkan Veedu members again, finally subduing her in an intense battle and making her a protectress of young children. Vadakkan Veedu is finally freed of its curses.

=== Story 8: Ghosts in Chambakkara village (Episodes 79–89) ===
Chambakkara village is a seaside fishing village where Kathanar becomes the villagers' favorite after he changes the bad behaviour of some people in the village. Meanwhile a female ghost is wandering the village at night killing multiple people, and a group of fishermen are attacked by the ghost of a Persian couple. Kathanar saves the villagers by destroying the female ghost and the ghosts of the Persian couple.

=== Story 9: Mariyamma's dilemma (Episodes 89–94) ===
Mariyamma worries about the stolen gold which she kept for her daughter Kochuthresia's marriage. When Kathanar visits and recovers the gold, Mariyamma and Kochuthresia try to commit suicide, only to be stopped by a boy who reveals himself to be Jesus Christ. Mariyamma seeks forgiveness from God and Kathanar returns her gold. Kochuthresia and Agasthya get engaged and Kathanar later teaches Agasthya's arrogant father Chacko a lesson.

=== Story 10: Nicholas's family in a haunted mansion (Episodes 95–119) ===
Nicholas's son Alan was killed by a spirit from a doll, leading to the family moving to a haunted mansion where supernatural events start happening. Kathanar finally learns that the main spirit is the family servant Ettichan, whom he destroys along with all the other spirits. Kathanar informs the family that the mansion was built on a cremation ground. Kathanar leaves the mansion and all the spirits move to the sky to attain peace.

=== Story 11: The haunted Eethenga Tharavadu (Episodes 119–130) ===
Eli Chettathy and her three daughters move to the Eethenga Tharavadu where ghosts start attacking the family members. Kathanar arrives and destroys the ghosts Nani and Manikyan. The family members thank Kathanar and all the problems in Eethenga Tharavadu come to an end.

=== Story 12: Conspiracy against Kathanar (Episodes 131–157) ===
Chadayan returns to team up with Vettiyala Vezhala and his assistant Mandhana in order to destroy Kathanar. They release Neeli's good power and made her evil again, murdering some villagers and some family members of Vaamanam Tharavadu. Kathanar finally destroys them, giving good powers to Neeli and warning her to be careful.

=== Curse of Thripangottu Kovilakkam (episodes 187–202) ===
Lord Surya Varma, the young heir of the Thripangottu Kovilakkam, is missing, and so the family calls for Kathannar to rescue their son. With the help of Kalidasan, another famed sorcerer and priest, Kathannar discovers that the family's curse begins with their ancestor Lord Udaya Varma, who lusted for a commoner girl Kalyani by feigning love. Kalyani ends up pregnant, is flatly rejected by Udaya Varma, but vows revenge. An enraged Udaya Varma kills Kalyani and her father, causing Kalyani to return as an evil spirit. Kathannar and Kalidasan locate the demon's hideout and rescue Surya Varma as well as exorcising the demon.

=== Vampire of Chandanamangalathu Tharavadu (episodes 202–217) ===
Jagathan Thambi and his family move to their ancestral home Chandanamangalathu Tharavadu which has been desolate for decades. Thambi hires a group of men to repair the house but the men unearth a sealed brass pot and accidentally release the evil spirit Gauri, a maidservant's daughter who was in love with the young male heir decades ago. After being mercilessly killed by the family she returned as a vengeful spirit and tormented the family and village but was subdued and exorcised by a powerful sorcerer in a brass pot. After being released, Gauri causes supernatural attacks on the family members with the intent of killing them. Kathanar successfully subdues and destroys the evil spirit in an intense supernatural battle, and assures the family that they will be soon blessed with a child.

== Cast ==
- Prakash Paul as Poulose/Kadamattathu Kathanar/Kadamattathachan
- Sukanya as Kalliyankattu Neeli/Yakshiyamma
- Poornima Anand as Neeli's alternate appearance
- Suvarna Mathew as Neeli's alternate appearance
- K.G. Devaki Amma as Neeli's alternate appearance
- Anila Sreekumar as Madhavi
- Manu Varma as Ramu
- Narendra Prasad as Mepradan Thirumeni
- Jagannathan as Achuthan Nair
- Sangeetha Rajendran as Panchali
- Anand Kumar as Keshu
- Sukumari as Dhathri
- Prathapachandran as Bhaskaran
- Reena as Janaki
- Dr Priya as Seetha
- Vysakh as Balan
- Maniyanpilla Raju as Anthony/Neeleshwaran
- Priyanka Anoop as Mangamma
- Kalady Omana as Vayattatti Paru and Kuttiyamma
- Aranmula Ponnamma as Valyamma
- Rajasaheb as Kochouseph
- Kollam G. K. Pillai as Kochunni Vaidyar
- Geetha Nair as Therutha
- Kollam Thulasi as Neeli's father
- Shanavas as Kannappan
- Bheeman Raghu as Ittan Pada Nair
- Rekha Ratheesh as Ittan Pada Nair's wife and Naani
- Raji Menon as Commander's wife
- Anitha Nair as Seetha
- Baby Praharshitha as Lakshmikutti
- Sidha Raj as Chadayan
- M. S. Thripunithura as Thirumeni
- Lalithasree as Durgamma
- Geetha Salam as Devassi
- Kozhikode Narayanan Nair as Karyakkaran
- Ramesh Kurumassery as Kochukunju
- Chaya Govind as Pennamma
- Kollam Shah as Chadahan's accomplice Ghost
- Anil Mohan as Devan
- N. L. Balakrishnan as Bhairava Rudhra Guru
- Sajan Sagara as Bhairava Gurus' Assistant
- Ashokan as Udaya Varma Thampuran
- Thara Kalyan as Ambika
- Sreekala as Devika Thamburatti
- Paravoor Ramachandran as Achan Thamburan
- Kumarakom Raghunath as Shankara Kurup
- Manka Mahesh as Subhadramma
- Sreeja Chandran as Paru
- Harijith Alangad as Marthandan
- Yathikumar as Kulamana Madathil Potti
- Anju as Ettukettu Veetil Bhanumathy
- Dominic Chittat as Madhavakurup
- Nayana Bindu as Ammu
- Bindu Murali as Kulamana Madathil Potti's wife
- Baby Neeraja as Demon girl
- Biju Pappan as Odiyan
- Harikumaran Thampi as a Traveller who escapes Odiyan
- Bharat Gopy as Brahmasree Killimangalam Thirumeni
- Balaji Sarma as Killimangalam Thirumeni's Nephew
- Manikandan Pattambi as Killimangalam Thirumeni's Assistant
- Master Ananthan as Killimangalam Thirumeni's Grandnephew
- Kalasala Babu as Chanthukutty Melan
- Shammi Thilakan as Unnikuttan
- Rajendran as Achooty
- Mahima as Devamma
- Meenakshi Sunil as Seetha
- Baby Sowbhagya Venkitesh as Kunjava
- Master Arun as Chanthu
- Aishwariyaa Bhaskaran as Thirumala / Yakshi
- Mala Aravindan as Kora
- Lakshmi Sanal as Kora's Wife
- Chembil Ashokan as Pathrose
- Kottayam Nazeer as Kuttappan
- Gayathri Varsha as Devaki
- Ramya Salim as Katrina
- P. I. Ibrahimkutty as Achankunju
- Bhavani as Mariyamma
- Shalu Menon as Kochuthresia
- Jija Surendran as Umma
- M. G. Sreekumar as Singer in Church
- Subair as Luka
- Saju Kodiyan as Chacko Chettan
- Lissy Jose as Chacko Chettan's wife
- Krishna Kumar as Nicholas
- Reshmi Soman as Emily Nicholas
- Master Venkatesh as Allen Nicholas
- Venu Nagavally as Ettichettan
- Fathima Babu as Margaret
- Kunchan as Perera
- Karthika Kannan as Clara
- Rishi as Arthur
- Kochu Preman as a Traveller who went to Eathenga Tharavadu
- Harsha Nair as Devooty
- Sulakshana as Eli Chettathy
- Roopa Sree as Saramma
- Soniya Baiju Kottarakkara as Mandhana
- G. K. Pillai as Mahapandithan
- Dinesh Panicker as Maharajan
- Remyasree as Devasena
- Aneesh Ravi as Thomakutty
- Baburaj as Jathavedan
- Keerikkadan Jose as Nagadathan
- Ajith Kollam as Bhadrakan
- Rudhra as Mythili/Indrani
- Zeenath as Kalyani Amma
- Sreelatha Namboothiri as Kumki
- Machan Varghese
- Renjini Krishna
- Baby Alis Christy
- Gopalan
- Rani Larius
- Rukmini as Ammaluvamma
- Ninu Thomas as Janaki
- Shaju as Neelakandan
- Raghavan as Fr. Emmanuel
- Urmila Unni as Thampuratti
- Harishanth as Ayilyam Thirunal Udaya Varma Alias Thripangottu Thampuran
- Rajan P. Dev as Kalidasan
- Poojappura Radhakrishnan
- Mayoori as Kalyani / Yakshi
- Sreenath as Jagadhan
- Suma Jayaram as Sathyabhama
- Subbalakshmi as Bhageerathi
- Abitha as Unnimaya
- Sajitha Betti as Gouri / Yakshi
- Ramesh Valiyasala as Kammaran
- T. P. Madhavan as Nambiar
- Kuttyedathi Vilasini as Nambiar's grandmother
- V. K. Sreeraman as Raugandharayanan
- Anil Murali as Vairajatha
- Kanakalatha as Devammaji
- Chandra Lakshman as Kadambari
- Baiju as Shravanan
- Madhu as Vasudevan's father
- Anju Aravind as Bhanumathi
- Suma Jayaram as Rani
- Chali Pala as Agnisarman
- Koottickal Jayachandran as Vasudevan
- P. Sreekumar as Fr. Abel
- Kailasnath
- Spadikam George as Lucifer
- Poojappura Ravi as Bhattathiri
- Jagannatha Varma as Thampuran

== Controversy ==
In August 2004 the Akhila Malankara Orthodox Almaya Vedi (AMOAV), an organisation representing lay members of the Malankara Orthodox Church, raised objections alleging that the script distorted the history, tradition, and culture of the Malankara Christian community. At a press conference held in Pathanamthitta the organisation's president Shibu K. Abraham and general secretary Preeth G. George demanded an immediate halt to the television show, stating that it hurt the religious sentiments of the Orthodox Christian community.

== Sequels ==
Two sequels to the series were aired: Kathanar Kadamattathu Kathanar (2008) on Jaihind TV; and Kadamattathachan (2010) on Surya TV. Actor Prakash Paul revealed that the 2008 version of the series led to severe financial losses since the channel had low viewership at the time and many were unaware of its existence. Although payments were initially prompt the channel eventually ran out of funds, forcing Paul to continue production without further financial support. He described this decision as a major setback and a source of lasting debt.

In June 2024 actor Prakash Paul confirmed that a new sequel to the original series was in development, featuring an aged version of Kadamattathu Kathanar returning to the present era. Paul stated that the continued popularity of the original series, especially through annual re-broadcasts on Asianet Plus, inspired the idea for the new version.
