= Tharangam (2017 film) =

- Official Poster
- Directed by: Dominic Arun
- Written by: Dominic Arun; Anil Narayanan
- Produced by: Dhanush; Mini studio
- Starring: Tovino Thomas; Unni Mukundan; Saiju Kurup; Balu Varghese; Unni Mukundan; Santhy Balachandran; Dileesh Pothan; Vijaya Raghavan; Manoj K Jayan
- Cinematography: Deepak D. Menon
- Edited by: Sreenath S
- Music by: Ashwin Renju
- Production companies: Wunderbar Films; Mini studio
- Distributed by: Wunderbar Films
- Release date: 29 September 2017
- Running time: 153 minutes
- Country: India
- Language: Malayalam

Tharangam (transl. Wave) is a 2017 Indian Malayalam-language fantasy black comedy film directed by Dominic Arun (in his directorial debut). It was the first Malayalam film produced by Dhanush under his banner Wunderbar Films, and starring Tovino Thomas, Unni Mukundan, Balu Varghese, Santhy Balachandran in the lead roles. Newcomer Ashwin Renju is the music director. The film was released in India on 29 September 2017.

== Plot ==
A covert mission gone wrong lands cops Pappan and Joy on serious trouble. Their investigation on Omana, a rich businessman's wife, leads them to further chaos as they cross paths with Siju, a smuggler and Raghu, a dreaded don.

== Cast ==
- Tovino Thomas as G. Padmanabhan Pillai "Pappan"
- Unni Mukundan as Raghu (cameo)
- Balu Varghese as Joy C
- Santhy Balachandran as Malini (Malu)
- Neha Iyer as Omana
- Dileesh Pothan as God
- Sijoy Varghese as Christopher Luke
- Vijaya Raghavan as Menon
- Manoj K Jayan as Antony Gonsalvez
- Shammi Thilakan as Tharian
- Saiju Kurup as Siju
- Sanju Sivram as Nandu
- Alencier Ley Lopez as Ittymani
- Abin Paul as Jimmy
- Unni Lalu as Deepu
- Sarath Sabha as Appukuttan

== Production ==
Tharangam is the first Malayalam film produced by Tamil actor Dhanush. Sukumar Thekkepat was the executive producer of the film. It is the directorial debut of Dominic Arun, who has previously directed short films. The film is made as a black comedy.

== Release ==
Tharangam was released in 106 screens across Kerala on 29 September 2017.

== Critical response ==
Critic Veeyen writes: "Tharangam' is a wickedly dark movie and one crazy ride, a work of comic insanity that asks you to buckle your seat belts on, simply feel the air rush against your face and let things be." He later on adds, "It could only be a real zany mind that would have the nerve to start off his film as this, and Dominic Arun within minutes has the audience dropping their jaws – either in amazement or in morbid fear of what's in store for the next couple of hours."

Anagha Jayan E from Malayala Manorama wrote: Dominic Arun's Tharangam unfurls its suspense-thriller plot in a very unconventional black-comedy mood. A normal action-thriller movie by all other means, Tharangam wangles an offbeat stamp through an avant-garde style of narration that fiddles with fantasy and magic realism.

Anjana George for The Times of India rated the film 3.5 out of 5 stars and wrote : Dominic Arun has successfully tried to serve a fantasy thriller which is a blend of Priyadarshan and Quentin Tarantino movies. It has well-narrated romance, suspense, action and emotions. If you are in the mood for a thrilling, fantasy movie, Tharangam is your best bet this season.

Soumya Rajendran for The News Minute rated Tharangam as 'A smart black comedy with a superb screen play'and wrote Debut director Dominic Arun's Tharangam is a smart black comedy with a racy screenplay and intricate plot.

Deepthi Sreenivasan for Deccan Chronicle rated Tharangam as 'Tovino's comic timing is spot on, complemented by Balu's performance'. Full of twists that would keep one on their toes, Tharangam is an unconventional black comedy, that visits Malayali screens rarely.

Meena Suresh for The New Indian Express said 'What makes Tharangam very unique is its narrative style. It manages to blend in fantasy and realism'
