= Odiyan clan =

Indian folklore clan

Odiyan (IPA: [oɖijɐn]) or Odian, Peony was once used in the Malappuram, Thrissur, Palakkad rural areas of Kerala to describe a group of people who claimed to be capable of scaring people to death using Odividya (ഒടിവിദ്യ, oṭividya) . Odiyan is a legendary character who existed in Kerala. Peony appear as half-man, half-beast like creatures lurking in alleyways at night. By applying certain herbs to specific parts of the body and chanting spells, the peonies are said to shape shift themselves to a bull, buffalo, felid, jackal or whatever form they desire. The devotees believed that this work would be fully effective if performed in a naked state.

In the past, Odiyans used to threaten and frighten people in the countryside under the cover of darkness. In parts of Malabar, oral tradition and regional histories identify pulayar as the principal practitioners of odividya. The story of Odiyan was popularized through oral tradition in the problem days when folktales and superstitions were rooted. In the same period when Maruta, Maadan and Yakshi were creating fear in the human mind. Undoubtedly, peonies are a distinct facet of witchcraft like Madan, Maruta, Kuttichatan and Pisach.

In order for the powerful magic used by Odiyans to work properly, the Otividya practitioners had to understand the year, day and birth star of the opponent. Knowing these things and reciting the main mantras of Otividya, it is said to be a specialty of Otividya. So much so that if one broke a thorn, the opponent's spine will break and he/she will die. Palakkad, Thrissur and Malappuram districts were the most affected by the harassment of Odiyans. Pulamanthol and Vilayur are parts of Malappuram district worth mentioning. The village of Peradiyur was a place that was plagued by the pestilence of Odiyan. In Valluvanad at that time, some extremely powerful Kalari practitioners who and Kanketta vidya used to go around killing people with Otividya. It is said that Otividya was once popular not only in northern Kerala but also in Tamilnadu.

== Preparation ==
Under the cover of night, after ritualistic special poojas, the person prepared to become an Odiyan undresses, smears magical ink known as pilla oil or pinna oil on both ears, and then transforms into a bull or a buffalo, or becomes invisible as they wish. In more hearsays, the forms of animals like bull and buffalo were generally adopted. The general practice is that the person who has acquired this power constantly watches for those who are hostile to him or his appointee, and hides in some bush, bend or ledge, and when the victim approaches, they appear in other forms and attack. A victim who is stunned by a sudden attack dies immediately or becomes unconscious due to fear and fever.

It is believed that Pillai oil was prepared in a special way, which was considered as a magic medicine for Ot Maryal. Proverbs tell about various methods of this. There are legends that the women of Odia Kuti established contact with the first pregnant women of Janmi clans and the women of Odia Kuti established contact, while rubbing the feet of the women of Janmi clans, aborted the pregnancy of pregnant women through some magical practices and induced pregnant women to commit suicide through magical techniques. Pillai oil is a magical medicine made by distilling the body of an unborn child collected from the dead bodies of women who committed suicide while pregnant. The occult practice of piercing the fetus of a pregnant woman with a bamboo stick is also found in some legends as the basis of Otividya.

Legend has it that they used to perform Otvidyya on unborn babies by ripping open their mothers' bellies and mixing a special liquid that comes out of the children's bodies with some greens and applying it behind the ears. In some cases, the peony would pre-empt the first-time pregnant women, and through witchcraft, they would lead the women to deserted areas in their sleep at night, and send them back after tearing open the woman's stomach and removing the fetus with a devil knife made of bamboo kept in hand. Women who go back like this are usually dead in bed the next morning. Because the wound on the pregnant woman's abdomen disappears with the fracture, the woman's death is ruled natural.

It is believed that this specially prepared ointment or ink is applied to the back of the ear to transform the peony. (Medicine spreads in two ways: rubbing behind the ear and keeping it behind the ear) They also used to do special fasts for that. Another belief is that the peony, which is carrying out the prescribed task, will run around his hut without turning over, and at that time, the woman of the Otia hut will pour water or hot water over the peony's head from the kitchen, and the peony will return to its old form. This act must be done immediately by the Odia woman, otherwise the unruly Odia would have brutally dragged and killed the woman of her own family. In the old days, if the odian went out at night to rob someone, Panan's wife used to wake up and boil hot water or wild water until he came back. There is another belief that a peony can transform itself without help if it takes medicine stored in its own ear.

== Method of attack ==
A peony hiding behind a disguised or invisible person who goes out at night for any purpose or comes home late rushes with lightning speed and tortures the back of the neck with a stick and knocks the victim down, and then climbs on this stick and kicks it on both sides so that the bones break. There is another method; A stick or green erkili is taken and pointed at the Vyaki and chanted. As soon as this rod or erkili is broken after chanting, the person immediately breaks and falls to the ground and dies instantly. Sensing that its prey is dead or dying, the peony runs away. Most of the time, the attack takes place on the victim's doorstep or backyard. Halfway through life, this person crawls into his backyard and bleeds to death. It is said that there are people who fell down and died instantly due to fear at the sight of the peony.

== In popular culture ==
- The 2018 Malayalam film Odiyan is based on the legend of the Odiyan clan.
- The 2025 Malayalam film Lokah Chapter 1: Chandra has a cameo appearance of Dulquer Salman as a member of the Odiyan clan.
- On 16 June 2026, the Malayalam film Odiyan: The Age of Illusion was announced. The film is written and directed by Rahul Sadasivan and stars Prithviraj Sukumaran and Manju Warrier in the lead roles.
