= Kunjiramayanam =

- Theatrical release poster
- Directed by: Basil Joseph
- Written by: Deepu Pradeep
- Produced by: Suvin K. Varkey
- Starring: Vineeth Sreenivasan; Dhyan Sreenivasan; Aju Varghese; Neeraj Madhav; Deepak Parambol; Biju Menon
- Narrated by: Biju Menon
- Cinematography: Vishnu Sarma
- Edited by: Appu N. Bhattathiri
- Music by: Justin Prabhakaran
- Production company: Little Big Films
- Distributed by: E4 Entertainment
- Release date: 28 August 2015
- Running time: 125 minutes
- Country: India
- Language: Malayalam

Kunjiramayanam (transl. The story of Kunjiraman) is a 2015 Indian Malayalam-language comedy film directed by Basil Joseph (in his directorial debut) and scripted by Deepu Pradeep.The film features Vineeth Sreenivasan, Dhyan Sreenivasan, Aju Varghese, Neeraj Madhav and Deepak Parambol in the lead roles. Kunjiramayanam was released on 28 August 2015.

== Plot ==
Kunjiraman, the nephew of "well-done" Vasu, plans to marry Vasu's daughter, Thankamani. All the plans are thwarted by Kunjiraman's dim-witted cousin, Laalu, who places an inappropriate cassette in Kunjiraman's VCR and later blames it on Kunjiraman. This incident causes a rift, and both families swear to have their child married before the other.

To avenge this, Kunjiraman goes to the Gulf to make money, meanwhile, Laalu becomes an apprentice in Kuttan's tailoring shop, where he looks up to Kuttan as his role model. On Kunjiraman's return, he plans to marry well and before Thankamani's wedding. His mother, Sumathi, fixes a marriage for him with Sajitha. On their engagement day, Sajitha makes Kunjiraman promise to stop drinking altogether, and as a sign of consent, Kunkiraman breaks a "Salsa" bottle and returns to the Gulf. After several failed attempts to bring Salsa into the village, it is realised that the place is now cursed and nobody is successful in bringing a bottle of Salsa.

Upon Kunjiraman's return, he becomes aware of the curse and publicly accepts the challenge to bring Salsa into the land in front of Laalu and Vasu, as a way to obtain respect in front of his village. On the night before his wedding, he sets out to bring a bottle of Salsa but ends up drunk and wakes up only the next noon, thereby not showing up for the wedding.

Kunjiraman leaves for the Gulf and after a series of events, Vasu reaches the village and unknowingly takes the bottle of Salsa that Ratheesh had bought earlier, only to find the villagers rushing to him and thus, Vasu obtaining the status of a local hero. But with this departure, another curse had befallen the land, the curse of failed marriages.

Meanwhile, Laalu is convinced by Kuttan that the local policeman's sister, Reshma, has an eye for him making Laalu dreamy. But his dreams are shattered when Kunjiraman returns after a year, and his mother fixes a marriage for him with Reshma. On hearing this, Laalu secretly plots against Kunjiraman with Kuttan. They plan to lock the door of Reshma's room the night before the engagement in hopes of locking her in during the auspicious time, thereby calling off the engagement. But the drunk Kuttan ends up locking the door from inside and spending the night in her room. Fearing shame from the society and the greed of the people to have a wedding, Reshma weds Kuttan, leaving both Kunjiraman and Laalu broken-hearted. Kunjiraman departs to the Gulf, but Kuttan tries to deviate Laalu from Reshma by convincing him that Paramu's daughter, Mallika, has an interest in him.

Meanwhile, Thankamani's wedding has been fixed, and Kunjiraman's mother insists on him marrying Mallika on the same day and same temple, when he returns. Laalu upon hearing this tries to spoil the occasion the night before, once again with Kuttan, by doing the same "locking the door" plan. Upon this, they discover Thankamani absconding (from her house to avoid the wedding), and they also learn that Kunjiraman never left and this was planned with Thankamani. All unite and they plan a way to prevent Thankamani's fiancée from reaching the temple.

On the wedding day, the group tries to block the way to prevent the groom from reaching the temple, only to discover him as a person not to be messed with, Manoharan. Manoharan agrees to this compromise and agrees to attend the wedding just for the sake of it.

At the temple, Kunjiraman and Thankamani are married, without prior consent, but the occasion goes well. But Manoharan plays his cards and does not let Laalu marry Mallika, instead, he marries Mallika, claiming that he will not leave the place empty-handed, leaving Laalu heartbroken once again. It is later seen that Mallika has had several affairs. Manoharan is convinced that the place is cursed and feels that he has received the land's biggest curse.

== Cast ==
- Vineeth Sreenivasan as Kunjiraman
- Dhyan Sreenivasan as Laalu
- Aju Varghese as "Cutpiece" Kuttan
- Neeraj Madhav as Kanjoottan
- Deepak Parambol as Sasi
- Hareesh Perumanna as Satheeshan
- Mamukkoya as "Well-done" Vasu
- Bijukuttan as Beeran
- Indrans as Paramu
- Seema G. Nair as Sumathi, Kunjiraman's mother
- Arya Rohit as Mallika
- Srinda Ashab as Sajitha
- Sneha Unnikrishnan as Reshma
- Sudheer Karamana as Police constable Sugunan
- Dinesh Prabhakar as Ramachandran
- K. T. S. Padannayil
- Pradeep Kottayam as the attender at the beverages counter
- Kulappulli Leela as Kuttan's mother
- Kottayam Purushan as Kuttan's father
- Disney James as Kunjiraman's neighbour
- Biju Menon as Manoharan (special appearance)
- Rimi Tomy as Thankamani (special appearance)
- Basil Joseph as the young politician (special appearance)

== Production ==
The movie is the debut of director Basil Joseph who was earlier known for directing short films Oru Thundupadam and Priyamvadha Katharayano. Brothers Vineeth Sreenivasan and Dhyan Sreenivasan are acting together for the first time.

The original schedule for the shoot was 44 days in Kudallur village, near Kollengode in Palakkad. The film shooting started on 23 April 2015 and was completed in 35 days with two schedules.

== Reception ==
=== Critical reception ===
The movie was released on 28 August 2015 across Kerala in 60 theatres.

Malayala Manorama gave a rating of 3/5 and said "Kunjiramayanam is an entertaining film for sure, definitely one that belongs to the not-to-be-missed category". Rejath RG of Kerala Kaumudi said, "Every character in Kunjiramayanam leaves an impression on the viewer. And that's the best thing about the movie. There are lots of scenes that offer genuine laughs. By the time the movie is over we feel like we have visited the Desham village. That signifies the success of the debutante director Basil Joseph." Entertainment website Filmibeat.com rated 2.5/5 and said "Kuniramayanam is a logic less fun-filled entertainer, for a one-time watch". Paresh C Palicha of Rediff.com gave a rating of 2.5/5 and said "The movie has things that keep us interested in proceedings though it tends to get repetitive once in a while. But we can confidently say that Kunjiramayanam is enjoyable".

=== Box office ===
The film made at a budget of ₹3cr collected a sum of ₹6cr within 14 days of release. Asianet bought the satellite rights. It collected ₹10cr from Kerala after 35 days of release. Kunjiramayanam reached second among the Onam releases.

== Music ==
Kunjiramayanam

Soundtrack album by Justin Prabhakaran
- Released: 4 August 2015
- Genre: Film soundtrack
- Length: 15:01
- Language: Malayalam
- Label: Muzik 247
- Producer: Justin Prabhakaran

Justin Prabhakaran chronology
Orange Mittai (2015)	Kunjiramayanam (2015)	Oru Naal Koothu (2016)
External audio
- Audio Jukebox on YouTube

"The soundtrack for Kunjiramayanam was released by Muzik247 on 4 August 2015, featuring songs composed by Justin Prabhakaran with lyrics by Manu Manjith. The sound design was handled by acclaimed recording engineer Prince Anselm, adding to the film's audio experience."

No.	Title	Lyrics	Singer(s)	Length
1.	"Thumba Poove Sundari"	Manu Manjith	Shankar Mahadevan	02:30
2.	"Ayyayyo Ayyayyo"	Manu Manjith	Vineeth Sreenivasan	04:08
3.	"Paavaada"	Manu Manjith	Daya Bijibal	03:39
4.	"Salsa"	Manu Manjith	Masala Coffee	03:31
