= Arun Kurian =

Indian film actor

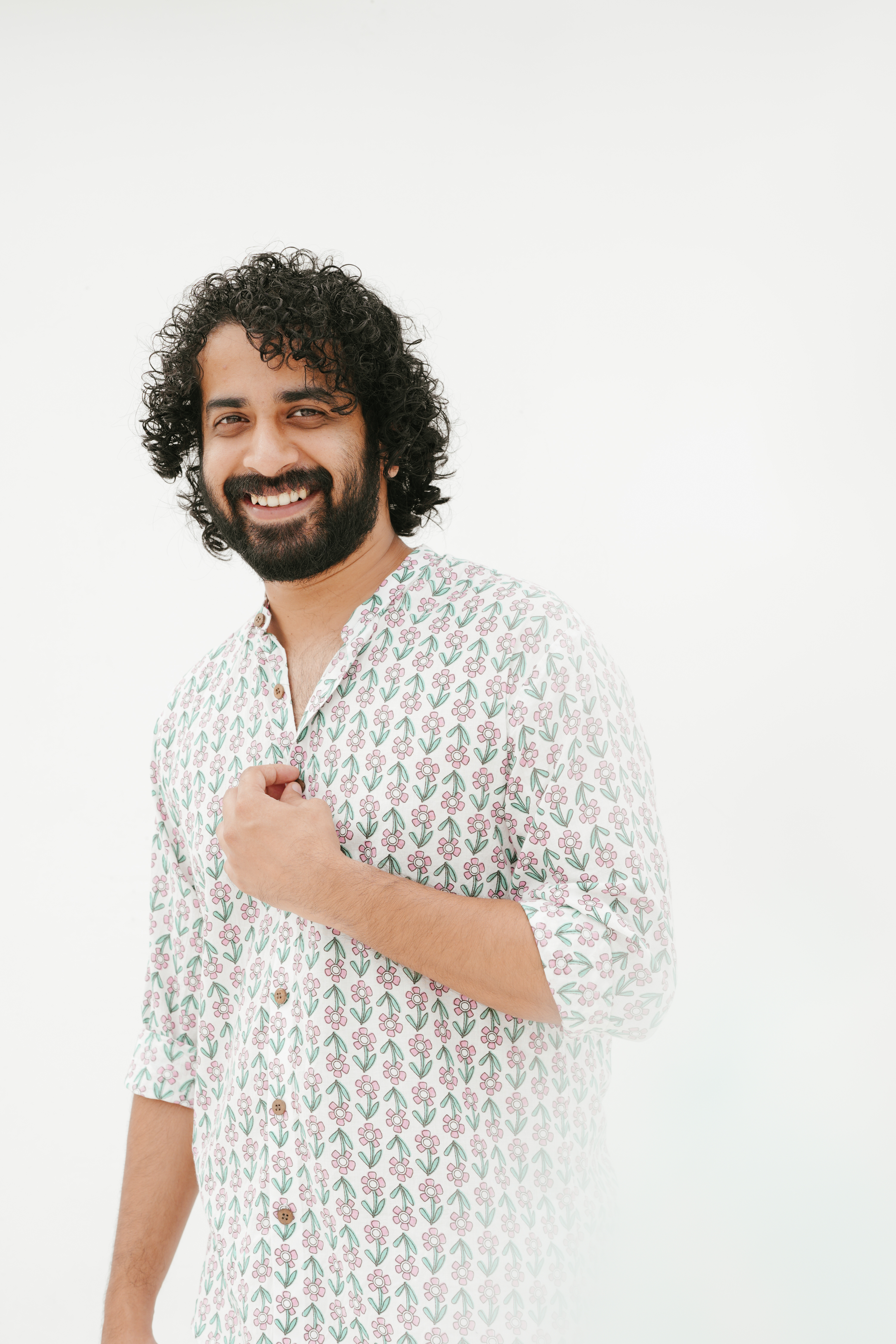
- Born: 4 November 1990 (age 35); Thiruvalla, Kerala, India
- Occupation: Actor
- Years active: 2016–present

Arun Kurian is an Indian actor who appears on Malayalam cinema. He made his feature film debut through a lead role in the coming of age film Aanandam (2016).

He played supporting roles in Velipadinte Pusthakam (2017), Oru Yamandan Premakadha (2019), Thamaasha (2019), Paapam Cheyyathavar Kalleriyatte (2019), Hridayam (2022), Manjummel Boys (2024) and Lokah Chapter 1: Chandra (2025).

== Career ==
A Thiruvalla native, Arun completed his schooling in Kuwait at the United Indian School until Class 9 and studied in Labour India Gurukulam Public School in Kerala after that. He earned his masters in business administration from Whistling Woods International Institute in Mumbai while simultaneously assisting in making ad films and sending his profile for audition tests. He made his acting debut as one of the seven lead actors in the 2016 coming of age film Aanandam. He played Varun, whom he described as a "less-talking, less-bullshit guy". The film was a commercial success. He then starred in Lal Jose's Velipadinte Pusthakam in 2017 in which he played Sameer, whom he described as a "gregarious type, a college-going city boy". He had two releases in 2019, Oru Yamandan Premakadha and Thamaasha in which he played supporting roles. He played one of the lead roles in the 2020 release Paapam Cheyyathavar Kalleriyatte.

== Filmography ==
=== Films ===
Year	Title	Role	Notes	Ref.
2016	Aanandam	Varun Manjooran	Debut film	
2017	Velipadinte Pusthakam	Sameer		
2019	Oru Yamandan Premakadha	Paappi John Kombanaayil		
2019	Thamaasha	Kamal		
2020	Paapam Cheyyathavar Kalleriyatte	Rohan		
2021	Marakkar: Arabikadalinte Simham	Young Anandan		
2022	Hridayam	Akhil Sathyan		
2022	Mukundan Unni Associates	Radhakrishnan Iyer	Photo appearance	
2022	1744 White Alto			
2023	Pookkaalam	Susheel		
2024	Marakkuma Nenjam	Arjun	Tamil film	
2024	Manjummel Boys	Sujith		
2025	Oho Enthan Baby	Gopal "Gops"	Tamil film	
2025	Lokah Chapter 1: Chandra	Naijil		
2026	Mollywood Times	Cameraman	Cameo appearance	

=== Web series ===
Year	Title	Channel	Notes
2019	Meen Aviyal	Arun	Webseries
2022	Putham Pudhu Kaalai Vidiyaadhaa	Paul	Tamil Webseries

=== Television ===
Year	Title	Channel	Note
2016	JB Junction	Kairali TV	
2016	I personally	Kappa TV	
2017	Kuttikalodaano Kali	Mazhavil Manorama	
2019	Comedy Nights with Suraj	Zee Keralam	
2019	Sunday Funday	Amrita TV	
