= List of Malayalam films of 2025 =

This is a list of Malayalam-language films released in 2025.

217 Malayalam films released in 2025, most of them in theatres and some directly on OTT platforms.

== Box office collection ==
The highest-grossing Malayalam films released in 2025, by worldwide box office gross revenue, are as follows.

*	Denotes films still running in cinemas worldwide

Highest worldwide gross of 2025
Rank	Title	Production company	Worldwide gross	Ref
1	Lokah Chapter 1: Chandra	Wayfarer Films	₹302–304 crore	(Note: Lokah Chapter 1: Chandra's reported worldwide gross is from ₹301.98 crore (The Telegraph) to ₹302.5 crore (ThePrint) to ₹303.2 crore (The Week) to ₹304 crore (The Hollywood Reporter))
2	L2: Empuraan	Aashirvad Cinemas; Sree Gokulam Movies; Lyca Productions	₹268.05 crore	(Note: L2: Empuraan's reported worldwide grosses vary between ₹265 crore (Mint) – ₹265.50 crore (Business Today) – ₹268 crore (DNA India) – ₹268.05 crore (Asianet News))
3	Thudarum	Rejaputhra Visual Media	₹238 crore	
4	Sarvam Maya	Firefly Films; Akhil Sathyan Films	₹153 crore	
5	Kalamkaval	Mammootty Kampany	₹85.2 crore	
6	Diés Iraé	Night Shift Studios; YNOT Studios	₹83 crore	
7	Hridayapoorvam	Aashirvad Cinemas	₹75.6–77.1 crore	
8	Alappuzha Gymkhana	Plan B Motion Pictures; Reelistic Studios	₹65 crore	
9	Rekhachithram	Kavya Film Company; Ann Megha Media	₹57.30 crore	
10	Officer on Duty	Martin Prakkat films	₹54.25 crore	

== January–March ==
*	Film released directly on OTT platform(s).

Opening		Title	Director	Cast	Production company / studio	Ref
JANUARY	2	Identity	Akhil Paul, Anas Khan	Tovino Thomas, Trisha Krishnan, Vinay Rai, Mandira Bedi	Ragam Movies, Confident Group	
JANUARY	3	Communist Pacha Adhava Appa	Shamim Moideen	Althaf Salim, Nazlin Jameela, Zakariya, Sajin Cherukayil	Haritha Entertainments	
JANUARY	3	ID – The Fake	Arun Sivavilasam	Dhyan Sreenivasan. Divya Pillai, Kalabhavan Shajohn	Essa Entertainments	
JANUARY	3	Mr Bengali	Joby Vayalunkal	Aristo Suresh, Boban Alummoodan, Kollam Thulasi	Vayalunkal Films	
JANUARY	3	Orumbettavan	Sugeesh Dhekshinakashi, Hari Narayanan KM	Indrans, Dayana Hameed, Jaffar Idukki, Sudheesh	Dhekshina Kashi Productions	
JANUARY	3	The Malabar Tales	Aniel Kunhappan	Siva Raaj, Anil Anto, Praseetha Vasu, Navya Baiju	Chalk Board films	
JANUARY	9	Rekhachithram	Jofin T Chacko	Asif Ali, Anaswara Rajan, Zarin Shihab, Megha Thomas, Manoj K. Jayan, Siddique, Sai Kumar	Kavya Film Company	
JANUARY	10	Ennu Swantham Punyalan	Mahesh Madhu	Arjun Ashokan, Balu Varghese, Anaswara Rajan, Renji Panicker	Truth Seekers Movie Productions	
JANUARY	10	Envazhi Thanivazhi	Joseph Jerin	Fazal Poonor, Akhila Sreelesh, Bindu Bala, Biju Lal, Sandeep Gopal	EPB Entertainments	
JANUARY	16	Pravinkoodu Shappu	Sreeraj Sreenivaasan	Soubin Shahir, Basil Joseph, Chemban Vinod Jose, Chandini Sreedharan	Anwar Rasheed Entertainment	
JANUARY	17	1098 Ten, Nine, Eight: A Countdown to Infinity	Guru Govind	Santhosh Keezhattoor, Monisha Warrier	Metamorphosis Movie House	
JANUARY	17	Aadachayi	Binoy G Russel	Chembil Ashokan, Pramod Veliyanad, Jolly Easo, Diana Binson,	JJ Productions	
JANUARY	17	Emerald	Krishna Sagar	Sandeep Ramesh, Amal Krrish	Adrenaline Rush Films	
JANUARY	17	Off Road	Shaji Stephan	Appani Sarath, Harikrishnan, Nilja K Babay, Hima Shankar	Reels & Frames	
JANUARY	23	Dominic and the Ladies' Purse	Gautham Vasudev Menon	Mammootty, Sushmitha Bhat, Gokul Suresh, Viji Venkatesh, Meenakshi Unnikrishnan	Mammootty Kampany	
JANUARY	23	Kayattam	Sanal Kumar Sasidharan	Manju Warrier, Vedh Vibes, Gaurav Raveendran	Manju Warrier Productions, NIV Art Movies	
JANUARY	24	Am Ah	Thomas Sebastian	Dileesh Pothan, Jaffar Idukki, Devadarshini	Kaapi Productions	
JANUARY	24	Anpodu Kanmani	Liju Thomaz	Arjun Ashokan, Anagha Narayanan, Althaf Salim	KreativeFish	
JANUARY	24	Avirachante Swantham Inangathi	Sony Joseph	Sreenivasan Nair, Maya Viswanath, Sharika Stalin	Sailasree Media Creations	
JANUARY	24	Aleena - The Beginning	Akshay Kappadan. Sanju Krishna	Kutty Sarah, Vipin Murikulathil, Ameya, Lasitha, Anilraj, Biju KL Bro	Cinematicket Productions	
JANUARY	24	Besty	Shaanu Samad	Ashkar Saudan, Shaheen Siddique, Sakshi Agarwal, Sravana TN	Benzy Productions	
JANUARY	24	Ente Priyathamanu	P Sethurajan	Mithun Madan, Dali Karan, Gowri Krishna, Mythily, Indrans, Madhupal	Chithravarnana Films	
JANUARY	24	Super Jimni	Anu Purushoth	Meenakshi Anoop, Seema G Nair, Jayakrishnan	Rhythm Creations	
JANUARY	26	Neelamudi	Sharath Kumar V	Achuthanandan, Subramanian, Sreenath, Majeed, Aditya Baby	Ram De Studios	
JANUARY	30	Ponman	Jothish Shankar	Basil Joseph, Sajin Gopu, Lijomol Jose, Deepak Parambol	Ajith Vinayaka Films	
JANUARY	31	4 Seasons	Vinod Parameswaran	Ameen Rasheed, Rhea Prabhu, Biju Sopanam, Riyas Narmakala	Transimage Productions	
JANUARY	31	Desakkaran	Ajaykumar Babu	Pathmaa Gopika, Ajaykumar Babu, Singal Thanmaya	Thavarakkattil Pictures	
JANUARY	31	Paranu Paranu Paranu Chellan	Jishnu Harindra	Unni Lalu, Samriddhi Tara, Sreeja Das, Sidharth Bharathan, Sajin Cherukayil	J M Infotainment	
JANUARY	31	Oru Jaathi Jathakam	M. Mohanan	Vineeth Sreenivasan, Nikhila Vimal, Kayadu Lohar, Aiswarya Mithun, Sayanora Philip, Pooja Mohanraj, Babu Antony, P.P. Kunhikrishnan	Varnachithra	
JANUARY	31	Oru Kadha Oru Nalla Kadha	Prasad Velachery	Shankar, Sheela, Ambika, Balaji Sarma, Kottayam Ramesh	Bright Productions	
JANUARY	31	The Secret of Women	Prajesh Sen	Aju Varghese, Niranjana Anoop, Suma Devi, Srikanth Murali	Prajeshsen Movie Club	
FEBRUARY	7	Narayaneente Moonnaanmakkal	Sharan Venugopal	Suraj Venjaramoodu, Joju George, Alencier Ley Lopez, Thomas Mathew, Shelly Kishore, Garggi Ananthan, Sajitha Madathil, Priya Sreejith	Jemini Phukan Production, Goodwill Entertainments	
FEBRUARY	7	Izha	Siraj Reza	Kalabhavan Navas, Rehna Navas, Sinoj Varghese	Salam Creations	
FEBRUARY	7	Lovedale	Vinu Sridhar	Reshma Renjith, Johan Shaji, Rama Shukla, Vishnu Sajeev, Meenakshi Aneesh	Amsterdam Movie International	
FEBRUARY	7	Love 4 Sale	Raju Joseph	Vaiga Rose, Sunil Sukhada, Balaji Sarma, Kottayam Ramesh, Nimisha Bijo	Dream World Productions	
FEBRUARY	14	Daveed	Govind Vishnu	Antony Varghese, Lijomol Jose, Mo Ismail, Vijayaraghavan, Aju Varghese	Century Max John & Mary Productions, Panorama Studios	
FEBRUARY	14	Bromance	Arun D. Jose	Arjun Ashokan, Mahima Nambiar, Mathew Thomas, Sangeeth Prathap, Shyam Mohan, Bharat Bopana	Aashiq Usman Productions, AU Productions	
FEBRUARY	14	Painkili	Sreejith Babu	Sajin Gopu, Anaswara Rajan, Roshan Shanavas, Chandu Salim Kumar, Jisma Vimal, Abu Salim, Riyaz Khan, Lijo Jose Pellissery	Fahadh Faasil & Friends, Urban Animal	
FEBRUARY	20	Officer on Duty	Jithu Ashraf	Kunchacko Boban, Jagadish, Vishak Nair, Priyamani	Martin Prakkat Films, The Green Room	
FEBRUARY	21	Chattuli	Raaj Babu	Shine Tom Chacko, Kalabhavan Shajohn, Jaffar Idukki, Sruthy Jayan, Varsha Prasad	Sha Faizy Productions, Nelson Ipe Cinemas, Navathej Films	
FEBRUARY	21	Get-Set Baby	Vinay Govind	Unni Mukundan, Nikhila Vimal, Shyam Mohan, Chemban Vinod Jose, Meera Vasudevan	Skanda Cinemas, Kingsmen Productions	
FEBRUARY	21	Thadavu - The Sentence	Fazil Razak	Beena R Chandran, PP Subramanian, Haritha P, Ishak Musafir	F R Productions, Bunch of Coconuts	
FEBRUARY	21	Urul	Mammy Century	Rafeeq Chokli, Tina Badia, Boban Alummoodan, Aparna Shibin, Viaan Mangalassery	Building Designers	
FEBRUARY	27	Machante Maalakha	Boban Samuel	Soubin Shahir, Namitha Pramod, Dhyan Sreenivasan	Abaam Movies	
FEBRUARY	28	Aap Kaise Ho	Vinay Jose	Dhyan Sreenivasan, Tanvi Ram, Ramesh Pisharody, Saiju Kurup, Jeeva Joseph	Funtastic Films. D Group	
FEBRUARY	28	Ariku	V S Sinoj	Senthil Krishna, Irshad Ali, Dhanya Ananya	KSFDC	
FEBRUARY	28	Athma Saho	Gopukiran Sadasivan	Renji Panicker, Chandhunadh, Sivapriya S, Sinoj Varghese	Tridev Productions	
FEBRUARY	28	Idi Mazha Kaattu	Ambili S Rengan	Chemban Vinod Jose, Priyamvada Krishnan, Sreenath Bhasi, Senthil Krishna	Win Ji Creations	
FEBRUARY	28	Randaam Yaamam	Nemom Pushparaj	Swasika, Gautham P. Krishna, Dhruvan, Joy Mathew, Rekha, Remya Suresh, Rajasenan	Fortune Films	
MARCH	7	Ouseppinte Osiyathu	Sarath Chandran RJ	Vijayaraghavan, Dileesh Pothan, Kalabhavan Shajohn, Zarin Shihab, Lena, Kani Kusruti	Maygoor Films	
MARCH	7	Maruvasham	Anuram	Alexander Prasanth, Sminu Sijo, Sreejith Ravi	Rams Film Factory	
MARCH	7	Pariwar	Ulsav Rajeev, Fahad Nandu	Jagadish, Indrans, Rajendran, Alexander Prasanth	Fragrant Nature Film Creations	
MARCH	7	Pralayashesham Oru Jalakanyaka	Manoju Kumar	Asha Aravind, Gokulan, Anagha Maria, Renjith Lalitham	KSFDC	
MARCH	7	Vadakkan	Sajeed A	Kishore, Shruthy Menon, Merin Philip, Garggi Ananthan, Meenakshi Unnikrishnan	Offbeet Studios	
MARCH	10	Roma 6	Shiju Peter	Prathana Pradeep, Ranjith Narayanan, Usha Kamal, Ajith Keezhara, Devaraj, Madanan Marar, Smitha K.N.	Juval Media Productions	
MARCH	14	Aranyam	SP Unnikrishnan	Lonappan Kuttanad, Divya sreedhar, Saji Soman, Lovely Babu, Pramod Veliyanad	SS Movies	
MARCH	14	Dassettante Cycle	Akhil Kavungal	Hareesh Peradi, Kabani Haridas, Vaidi Peradi	Hareesh Peradi Productions	
MARCH	14	Kaadakam	Jain Christopher	Ratheesh Krishna, Nandhana Satheesh, Govindan Namboothiri, Jose Chacko	Cherukara Films	
MARCH	14	Leech	S M	Anoop Rethna, Sandya Nair, Nizam Calicut, Kannan Viswanathan, Zuhail Sulthan	Book of Cinema Production	
MARCH	14	Rakshasi: Ladykiller	Mehamood K S	Preeti Goswami, Salim Baba, Kailash	LGF Studios, Roshika Enterprises	
MARCH	14	The Waiting List: An Antidote	Cherian Mathew	Avinash Vijayan, Kottayam Ramesh, Selby Scaria, Sohan Seenulal	Evergreen Night Productions	
MARCH	14	Uttavar	Anil Dev	Arun Narayanan, Athira Sudheer, Saji Sopanam	Film Fantasy	
MARCH	21	Alakadal	Balu C K	Balu C K, Nitheesha, Manu Varma, Nilambur Ayisha	ST Film Group	
MARCH	21	Kailasathile Athidhi	Ajay Sivaram	Dr. Shanavas, Sabu Thiruvalla, Sharadha Calicut, Master Karthik	Tripal International	
MARCH	21	Sairayum Njanum	Dharmaraj Muthuvara	Shivaji Guruvayoor, Neena Kurup	FCM Creations	
MARCH	21	Sorry	Akshay Chandrasobha Asok	Aromal Devaraj, Ashkar Ali, Reghna Biju, Ashwin Mohan, Amal Uday	ADE	
MARCH	21	Thiruth	Joshy Vallithala	Santhosh Kumar, Nimisha Rosie, Joshy Vellithala, Sreerekha Anil	AMK Productions	
MARCH	27	L2: Empuraan	Prithviraj Sukumaran	Mohanlal, Prithviraj Sukumaran, Indrajith Sukumaran, Tovino Thomas, Manju Warrier	Aashirvad Cinemas, Sree Gokulam Movies, Lyca Productions	
MARCH	29	Abhilasham	Shamzu Zayba	Saiju Kurup, Arjun Ashokan, Tanvi Ram	Second Show Productions	

== April–June ==
Opening		Title	Director	Cast	Production company / studio	Ref
APRIL	10	Bazooka	Deeno Dennis	Mammootty, Gautham Vasudev Menon, Sidharth Bharathan, Divya Pillai	Yoodlee Films, Theatre of Dreams	
APRIL	10	Maranamass	Sivaprasad	Basil Joseph, Anishma Anilkumar, Babu Antony, Siju Sunny, Suresh Krishna, Rajesh Madhavan, Pooja Mohanraj	Tovino Thomas Productions, World Wide Films, Rapheal Productions	
APRIL	10	Alappuzha Gymkhana	Khalid Rahman	Naslen, Lukman Avaran, Ganapathi S. Poduval, Sandeep Pradeep, Anagha Maya Ravi, Noila Francy	Plan B Motion Pictures	
APRIL	14	Ebenezer	Midhun Bose	Aiswarya Sekar, Anjana Prakash, Krishna Viswam, Sana Khan, Suraj Sundar	Shotsudios Productions	
APRIL	18	Hathane Udaya	Kunjiraman Panikker	Devaraj Kozhikkode, Ram Vijay, Athira, Shiny Vijayan	NatyaDharmi Creations	
APRIL	19	Cake Story	Sunil	Veda Sunil, Ashokan, Babu Antony, Mallika Sukumaran	Chithravedh Reels, JKR Films	
APRIL	24	Padakkuthira	Salon Simon	Aju Varghese, Sija Rose, Indrans, Joemon Jyothir	Mabins Productions, Feel Flying Entertainments	
APRIL	25	Himuchri	Binu Varghese	Arun Dayanand, Shylaja Sreedharan	EX & EX Creations	
APRIL	25	Thudarum	Tharun Moorthy	Mohanlal, Shobana, Prakash Varma, Binu Pappu, Thomas Mathew, Farhaan Fasil	Rejaputhra Visual Media	
MAY	1	Mahal: In the Name of Father	Nazer Irimbiliyam	Shaheen Siddique, Unni Nair, Lal Jose, Usha Payyannur, Kshama Krishna	Imak Productions	
MAY	2	L Jagadamma Ezhaam Class B - State First	Shivas	Urvashi, Balachandran Chullikkad, Jayan Cherthala	Fossil Holdings	
MAY	2	Karthavu Kriya Karmam	Abilash S	PR Harilal, Satish Bhasker, Sherly Saji	Village Talkies	
MAY	2	Mother Mary	AR Vadikkal	Vijay Babu, Dayana Hameed, Lali PM, Nirmal Palazhi, Sohan Seenulal	Mushroom Visual Media	
MAY	3	Pathu Maasam	Sumod, Gopu	Kavitha Jose, Suresh Thiruvali, Raiza Biljee	Nihar Films	
MAY	8	Padakkalam	Manu Swaraj	Suraj Venjaramoodu, Sharaf U Dheen, Sandeep Pradeep	Friday Film House, 29 September Works	
MAY	8	Sarkeet	Thamar KV	Asif Ali, Divya Prabha, Deepak Parambol	Ajith Vinayaka Films	
MAY	9	Prince and Family	Binto Stephen	Dileep, Raniya Raanaa, Dhyan Sreenivasan, Siddique, Meenakshi Madhavi	Magic Frames	
MAY	9	Shanthamee Rathriyil	Jayaraj	Esther Anil, K. R. Gokul, Sidharth Bharathan, Viji Venkatesh	New Generation Cinema	
MAY	16	Lovely	Dileesh Karunakaran	Mathew Thomas, Unnimaya Prasad, Manoj K. Jayan	Western Ghats Productions, Neni Entertainments	
MAY	16	A Dramatic Death	Saheer Ali	Asharaf Mallissery, Shailaja Ambu, KK Sajan	S and S Productions	
MAY	16	Back Benchers	Sujith Menon	Mithun Saaransh, Nimmy Kunjumon, Jishnu Viswanath	Sivanya Creations	
MAY	16	Rasa	Jessen Joseph	Kailash, Jessen Joseph, Suma Devi	Highmast Cinemas	
MAY	16	Samshayam	Rajesh Ravi	Sharaf U Dheen, Vinay Forrt, Lijomol Jose, Priyamvada Krishnan, Priya Sreejith	1895 Studios	
MAY	16	Oru Vadakkan Pranaya Parvvam	Vijesh Chembilod	Sooraj Sun, Shabareesh Varma, Anjana Prakash, Dayana Hameed	A-One Cine Food Productions	
MAY	23	Mr & Mrs Bachelor	Deepu Karunakaran	Indrajith Sukumaran, Anaswara Rajan, Rosin Jolly, Rahul Madhav	Highline Pictures	
MAY	23	916 Kunjoottan	Aryan Vijay	Guinness Pakru, Dayyana Hameed, Tini Tom, Niya Varghese, Rini Ann George	Morze Dragon Entertainment	
MAY	23	Azadi	Jo George	Sreenath Bhasi, Raveena Ravi, Saiju Kurup, Vani Viswanath	Little Crew Production	
MAY	23	Detective Ujjwalan	Indraneel Gopeekrishnan, Rahul G	Dhyan Sreenivasan, Siju Wilson, Rony David Raj, Claire C John, Kottayam Nazeer	Weekend Blockbusters	
MAY	23	Narivetta	Anuraj Manohar	Tovino Thomas, Priyamvada Krishnan, Cheran, Suraj Venjaramoodu, Arya Salim	Indian Cinema Company	
MAY	23	Sathyam Ningale Swathanthrarakkum	Antony Abraham	Sreeganga, Namitha Alexander, Midhun Babau	ETSA Creation, RTE Films	
MAY	30	Moonwalk	Vinod A K	Anunath VP, Sanjana Doss, Sujith Prapanchan, Meenakshi Raveendran, Moses R	Magic Frames, Firewood Shows	
MAY	30	Najuss: An Impure Story	Sreejith Poyilkavu	Manoj Govindan, Kailash, Sajitha Madathil, Titto Wilson, Ambili Ouseph	Wide screen Media Productions, Neelambari Productions	
MAY	30	Once Upon A Time There Was A Kallan	Fazil Mohammed	Sreenath Bhasi, Sreelakshmi Sreekumar, Thesni Khan, Tini Tom, Pratap Pothen	Teyos Creations	
MAY	30	Shaman	Sharon K Vipin	Pious Paul, Athulya S	J Class Productions	
JUNE	5	Written & Directed by God	Febi George Stonefield	Saiju Kurup, Sunny Wayne, Aparna Das	TJ Productions, Nettooraan Films	
JUNE	6	Aabhyanthara Kuttavaali	Sethunath Padmakumar	Asif Ali, Thulasi, Shreya Rukmini, Azees Nedumangad, Anand Manmadhan	Naisam Salam Productions	
JUNE	6	Thelivu Sahtham	Sakeer Mannarmala	Nishanth Sagar. Major Ravi, Greeshma Joy, Abu Salim, Malavika Anilkumar	Jollywood Movies	
JUNE	6	Thug CR 143/24	Balu S Nair	Dhyan Sreenivasan, Bindu Panicker, Siddique, Sadhika Venugopal	The Plan Balu Entertainments. SNZ Films	
JUNE	6	The Life of Mangrove	N N Baiju	Ayisha Bin, Dinesh Panicker, Sudheer Karamana	S & H Films	
JUNE	6	Pattth	Jithin Issac Thomas	Ashik Aboobakker, Gauthami Gopan	Mangoes N’ Coconuts	
JUNE	13	Ronth	Shahi Kabir	Roshan Mathew, Dileesh Pothan, Krisha Kurup, Lakshmi Menon	Festival Cinemas, Junglee Pictures	
JUNE	13	Vyasanasametham Bandhumithradhikal	S Vipin	Anaswara Rajan, Siju Sunny, Joemon Jyothir, Mallika Sukumaran	WBTS Productions, Shine Screens	
JUNE	13	E Valayam	Revathi S Varmha	Ashly Usha, Sandra Nair, Shalu Rahim, Renji Panicker, Muthumani	GDSN Entertainments, Filmfeast Creators	
JUNE	13	Nerariyum Nerathu	Renjith venugopal	Abhiram Radhakrishnan, Shibla Farah, Swathidas Prabhu, Swetha Vinod	Veny Productions	
JUNE	13	PDC Athra Cheriya Degree Alla	Raaffi Mathirra	Binu Pappu, Johny Antony, Veena Nair, Manju Pathrose	IFAR International	
JUNE	13	The Protector	G M Manu	Shine Tom Chacko, Manikuttan, Kajal Johnson	Ambat Films	
JUNE	18	Nancy Rani	Joseph Manu James	Ahaana Krishna, Arjun Ashokan, Aju Varghese, Sunny Wayne, Sreenivasan	Kailash Films	
JUNE	20	United Kingdom of Kerala	Arun Vaiga	Ranjith Sajeev, Sarangi Shyam, Johny Antony, Manju Pillai	Fragrant Nature Film Creations, Pooyappally Films	
JUNE	20	Aadrika	Abhijit Adhya	Niharica Raizada, Ajumalna Azad, Donovan Wodehouse	The Garage House Productions, Uniiq Films, Raizada Entertainments	
JUNE	20	Thetta	Renish Yousaf	Ameer Niyaz, Ajeesha Prabhakar, Sarath Vikram	Pallikkattil Productions	
JUNE	20	Police Day	Santhosh Palodu	Tini Tom, Ansiba Hassan, Dharmajan Bolgatty, Jeeva Nambiar	Sadananda Films	
JUNE	26	Undead	Sen Varghese	Karthik B, Abin Sukumaran, Harisankar D	Saras Films	
JUNE	27	Koodal	Shanu Kakkoor, Shafi Epikkad	Bibin George, Mareena Michael Kurisingal, Riya Isha, Niya Varghese, Anu Sonara, Vineeth Thattil David	P and J Productions	
JUNE	27	The Real Kerala Story	Jaykumar Nair	Santhosh Keezhattoor, Sreedhanya, Khushbu	Monarch Productions	

== July–September ==
Opening		Title	Director	Cast	Production company / studio	Ref
JULY	4	Dheeran	Devadath Shaji	Rajesh Madhavan, Manoj K. Jayan, Jagadish, Ashokan, Sudheesh, Aswathy Manoharan	Cheers Entertainments, Urban Motion Pictures	
JULY	4	Jangar	Manoj Yadav	Appani Sarath, Renu Soundar, Shabareesh Varma, Shwetha Menon	M C Movies	
JULY	4	Moppala	Santhosh Puthukkunnu	Santhosh Keezhattoor, Rithesh Aramana, Soniya Malhaar	Vanashree Creations	
JULY	10	Veru	Shahid Puthanathani	Pratheesh, Renu Sudhi, Santosh Varkey, Alan Jose Perrera	Mass Productions	
JULY	11	Kolahalam	Rasheed Parambil	Santhosh Puthan, Anusha Aravindakshan, Vishnu Balakrishnan, Priya Sreejith, Chithra Prasad	Fine Films	
JULY	11	Soothravakyam	Eugien Jos Chirammel	Shine Tom Chacko, Vincy Aloshious, Deepak Parambol, Divya M Nair, Srikanth Kandragula	Cinemabandi Productions	
JULY	17	JSK: Janaki V v/s State of Kerala	Pravin Narayanan	Suresh Gopi, Anupama Parameswaran, Madhav Suresh, Shruti Ramachandran, Divya Pillai	Cosmos Entertainments	
JULY	18	Apoorva Puthranmar	Rejith R L	Vishnu Unnikrishnan, Bibin George, Payal Radhakrishnan, Ammayra Goswami	Yvaine Entertainments	
JULY	18	Raveendra Nee Evide?	Manoj Palodan	Anoop Menon, Dhyan Sreenivasan, Sheelu Abraham, Azees Nedumangad	Abaam Movies	
JULY	18	Flask	Rahul Riji Nair	Saiju Kurup, Suresh Krishna, Sidharth Bharathan, Aswathy Sreekanth	First Print Studios, Fairy Frames Productions	
JULY	18	Jagala	Sreedev Kappur	Mareena Michael Kurisingal, Murali Ram, Santhosh Keezhattoor, Anju Aravind	Kalarikkal Films	
JULY	18	Sea of Love - Kadalolam Sneham	Sai Krishna	Dilsha Prasannan, Jibnu Jacob, Meera Nair	Vinreels Digital	
JULY	25	Oru Ronaldo Chithram	Rinoy Kalloor	Aswin Jose, Chaithania Prakash, Hanna Reji Koshi, Mithun M Das, Varsha Kurian	Fulfill Cinemas	
JULY	25	Paattaya Kadha	A.G.S.	Cristy Binnett, Vadivel Chitharangan, Manu Kumbari. Anugraha Sujith	Moonlight Creations, Amazing Cinemas	
JULY	25	Valampiri Shanku	Shamnad	Ajeesh Kumar, Gowri S, Shahanad Shaji, Lekshmi Prakash	Olakka Entertainments	
AUGUST	1	Sumathi Valavu	Vishnu Sasi Shankar	Arjun Ashokan, Malavika Manoj, Gokul Suresh, Balu Varghese, Sshivada	Waterman Films LLP; Sree Gokulam Movies	
AUGUST	1	Meesha	Emcy Joseph	Kathir, Shine Tom Chacko, Hakkim Shah	Unicorn Movies	
AUGUST	1	Rajakanyaka	Victor Adam	Athmiya Rajan, Victor Adam, Bhagath Manuel, Mareena Michael Kurisingal	Wise King Movies	
AUGUST	1	Surabhila Sundara Swapnam	Tony Mathews	Rajalakshmi Rajan, Paul Viji Varghese, Dayyana Hameed	Fantasy Frames	
AUGUST	1	Thayyal Machine	C S Vinayan	Kichu Tellus, Gayathri Suresh, Sruthy Jayan, Rajiv Rajan	Gops Entertainments	
AUGUST	8	Mehfil	Jayaraj	Mukesh, Unni Mukundan, Asha Sharath, Siddharth Menon	Widescreen Media Productions	
AUGUST	8	Sahasam	Bibin Krishna	Narain, Gouri G. Kishan, Aju Varghese, Varsha Ramesh, Babu Antony	Front Row Productions, Spire Productions	
AUGUST	8	Sangarsha Ghadana - Art of Warfare	Krishand R. K.	Vishnu Agasthya, Mridula Murali, Sanoop Padaveedan, Rahul Rajagopal	Krishand Films, Joker Show Reels	
AUGUST	8	Ethu Nerathaanavo	Jinoy Janardhanan	Jinoy Janardhanan, Geethi Sangeeta, Kedar Vivek, Manika Raj	Jpic Movies	
AUGUST	21	The Case Diary	Dilip Narayanan	Ashkar Saudan, Sakshi Agarwal, Rahul Madhav, Riyaz Khan	Benzy Productions	
AUGUST	22	Thalavara	Akhil Anilkumar	Arjun Ashokan, Revathy Sharma, Ashokan, Devadarshini	Shebin Backer Productions; Moving Narratives	
AUGUST	28	Hridayapoorvam	Sathyan Anthikad	Mohanlal, Malavika Mohanan, Sangeeth Prathap, Sangita Madhavan Nair	Aashirvad Cinemas	
AUGUST	28	Lokah Chapter 1: Chandra	Dominic Arun	Kalyani Priyadarshan, Naslen, Sandy, Chandu Salim Kumar, Arun Kurian, Vijayaraghavan	Wayfarer Films	
AUGUST	29	Maine Pyar Kiya	Fazil Faziludeen	Hridhu Haroon, Preity Mukhundhan	Spire Productions	
AUGUST	29	Odum Kuthira Chaadum Kuthira	Althaf Salim	Fahadh Faasil, Kalyani Priyadarshan, Revathi Pillai, Vinay Forrt, Lal, Suresh Krishna, Anuraj OB	Ashiq Usman Productions	
SEPTEMBER	11	Poyyamozhi	Sudhi Anna	Jaffar Idukki, Meenakshi Anoop, Nathaniel Madathil	Tiny Hands Productions	
SEPTEMBER	12	Midnight In Mullankolli	Babu John	Akhil Marar, Jaffar Idukki, Joy Mathew, Kottayam Nazeer, Navas Vallikkunnu, Abhishek Sreekumar	Stargate Productions	
SEPTEMBER	19	Mirage	Jeethu Joseph	Asif Ali, Aparna Balamurali, Hakim Shahjahan, Deepak Parambol, Hannah Reji Koshy, Sampath Raj	Naad Sstudios, E4 Experiments, Seven 1 Seven Productions, Bedtime Stories	
SEPTEMBER	19	Jerriyude Aanmakkal	Gijo Sebastian	Suresh Prem, Aishwarya Nambiar, Noby Marcose	Emma Global Group Creations	
SEPTEMBER	19	Odiyangam	Sunil Subramanian	Sreejith Panicker, Gopinath Raman, Nisha Rithi, Vinaya JP, Soja Meethu	Swasthik Vinayak Creations, Shree Mahalakshmi Enterprise	
SEPTEMBER	19	Vala: Story of a Bangle	Muhashin	Dhyan Sreenivasan, Lukman Avaran, Vijayaraghavan, Shanthi Krishna, Raveena Ravi, Navas Vallikkunnu, Abu Salim	Fairbay Films	
SEPTEMBER	25	Karam	Vineeth Sreenivasan	Noble Babu Thomas, Audrey Miriam Henest, Ivan Vukomanović, Manoj K. Jayan, Reshma Sebastian, Shwetha Menon	Habit of Life, Merryland Cinemas	
SEPTEMBER	26	Balti	Unni Sivalingam	Shane Nigam, Shanthanu Bhagyaraj, Preethi Asrani, Alphonse Puthren, Selvaraghavan	STK Frames, Binu George Alexander Productions	
SEPTEMBER	26	Moonnam Nombaram	Joshy Illath	Sajan Surya, Dhanya Mary Varghese, Dinesh Panicker, Ambika Mohan	Cezen Media	
SEPTEMBER	26	Valsala Club	Anush Mohan	Karthik Shankar, Gouri Unnimaya, Akhil Kavalayoor, Roopesh Peethambaran, Dhyan Sreenivasan, Mallika Sukumaran, Priya Sreejith	Falcon Cinemas	
SEPTEMBER	28	Kalaratri	Anand Krishnaraj	Thambu Wilson, Abhimanue Sajeev, Jolly Antony, Maria Abish, Adrian Abish	Greymonk Pictures	

== October–December ==
Opening		Title	Director	Cast	Production company / studio	Ref
OCTOBER	5	Thampachi	Manoj T Yadav	Rahul Madhav, Appani Sarath, Aaliya, Sudheer Karamana	True Movie Makers	
OCTOBER	10	Avihitham	Senna Hegde	Unniraja, Renji Kankol, Vineeth Chakyar, Dhanesh Koliyat, Rakesh Ushar, Vrinda Menon	Marley State Of Mind, E4 Entertainments, Imagin Cinemas	
OCTOBER	10	Feminichi Fathima	Fasil Muhammed	Shamla Hamza, Kumar Sunil, Viji Viswanath, Praseedha, Babitha Basheer	AFD Cinemas	
OCTOBER	10	Private	Deepak Deon	Indrans, Meenakshi Anoop, Annu Antony	C'Factor the Entertainment Company	
OCTOBER	10	A Pan Indian Story	V C Abhilash	Vishnu Unnikrishnan, Dharmajan Bolgatty, Remya Suresh, Shailaja Ambu	Nalla Cinema Productions	
OCTOBER	10	Agasthyatheertham	Kattakada Sajith	Girish Chandran, Keerthana, Malini, Gokulam Sreekumar	Glittering Stars Productions	
OCTOBER	16	The Pet Detective	Praneesh Vijayan	Sharaf U Dheen, Anupama Parameswaran, Vinay Forrt, Vinayakan, Shyam Mohan, Joemon Jyothir, Althaf Salim	Sree Gokulam Movies, Sharf U Dheen Productions	
OCTOBER	16	Theatre	Sajin Baabu	Rima Kallingal, Sarasa Balussery, Dain Davis	Anjana Talkies	
OCTOBER	17	Paathirathri	Ratheena PT	Navya Nair, Soubin Shahir, Sunny Wayne, Ann Augustine, Athmiya Rajan, Pooja Mohanraj	Benzy Productions	
OCTOBER	24	Nellikkampoyil Night Riders	Noufal Abdullah	Mathew Thomas, Roshan Shanavas, Meenakshi Unnikrishnan, Merin Philip	A & H S Productions	
OCTOBER	24	Kanoli Bandset	Goutham Ravindran	Roshan Chandra, Lisha Ponni, Rishi Suresh, Saju Kodiyan	Western Breeze Pictures	
OCTOBER	31	Diés Iraé	Rahul Sadasivan	Pranav Mohanlal, Sushmitha Bhat, Jibin Gopinath, Arun Ajikumar, Sreedhanya, Manohari Joy, Jaya Kurup, Priya Sreejith	Night Shift Studios, YNOT Studios	
OCTOBER	31	Cherukkanum Pennum	Pradeep Nair	Sreejith Vijay, Deepthi Nambiar, Dileesh Pothan, Riya Saira	Nanthiyattu FIlms	
OCTOBER	31	Swapnasundari	Philip K.J.	Rajith Kumar, Jinto Bodycraft, Sharlet Sajeev, Shivaji Guruvayoor, Sharon Sahim	S.S.Productions, Alphonse Visual Media	
OCTOBER	31	Madhuram Jeevamruthabindu	Shamzu Zayba, Appu N Bhattathiri, Prince Joy, Jenith Kachappilly	Basil Joseph, Lal, Dayana Hammed, Suhasini Maniratnam, Saiju Kurup, Wafa Khatheeja	AVA Productions	
NOVEMBER	7	Innocent	Satheesh Thanvi	Althaf Salim, Anarkali Marikar, Anna Prasad, Kili Paul, Joemon Jyothir, Azees Nedumangad, Unni Lalu	Elements of Cinema Entertainment	
NOVEMBER	7	Ithiri Neram	Prasanth Vijay	Roshan Mathew, Zarin Shihab, Nandu, Anand Manmadhan		
NOVEMBER	14	Athibheekara Kaamukan	CC Nithin; Gautham Thaniyil	Lukman Avaran, Drishya Raghunath, Manohari Joy	Pink Bison Studios, Etcetera Entertainments	
NOVEMBER	14	Amos Alexander	Ajay Shaji	Jaffar Idukki, Aju Varghese, Tara Joseph, Dayyana Hameed	Manjadi Creations	
NOVEMBER	14	Nidhiyum Bhoothavum	Saja Joseph	Aneesh G. Menon, Aswath Lal, Naira Nihar, Muhammed Raffi, Radha Gomaty	Veeru Waves	
NOVEMBER	14	Page	Anish Urumbil	Bibin George, Anusree, Arun Ashok	BAT Bros	
NOVEMBER	14	Oru Start Action Story	T S Arun Giladi	T S Arun Giladi, Deepa Prabha, D L Baburaj	Arunodayam Creations	
NOVEMBER	14	Oru Wayanadan Kadha	Ameer Basheer	Ameer Basheer, Sneha Unnikrishnan, Baiju Ezhupunna, Devi Ajith	Kalathil Films	
NOVEMBER	21	Vilayath Buddha	Jayan Nambiar	Prithviraj Sukumaran, Priyamvada Krishnan, Shammi Thilakan, Anu Mohan, Rajashree	Urvashi Theatres; AVA Productions	
NOVEMBER	21	Aavani	R Rajamohan	Sooraj Sun, Aaliyah, Devan, Kailash	Devadas Films	
NOVEMBER	21	Comondra Alien	Nandakumar A P	Joji Abraham, Lissy Sayan, Nandakumar A P	Nanda Kumar Films Productions	
NOVEMBER	21	Help Line	Asramam Chellappan	Aromal Dev, Chandana Aravind, Priya Unni, Vijayalekshmi	Sawak of India	
NOVEMBER	21	Shades of Life	Rasheed Ahammad, Jamsheer Muhammad, Natarajan Pattambi	Niyas Backer, Bhaskar Arvind, Sreeja Das, Dasan Kongad, Ramani Mancheri, S K Mini, Aswathi Mohanan.	Classic Media Entertainments	
NOVEMBER	21	Eko	Dinjith Ayyathan	Sandeep Pradeep, Saurabh Sachdeva, Biana Momin, Vineeth, Ashokan, Narain	Aaradyaa Studios	
NOVEMBER	23	Inland	S K Sreejith Lal	Aldrin Thampan, Sundari Amma, Vishnu Manampoor	Siddhivinayaka Creations, Plan B Productions	
NOVEMBER	28	Ayyappanum Vapuranum	K G Vijayakumar	Jefry George, Bhama Arun, Neena Kurup, Shivaji Guruvayoor	KGV Cinemas	
NOVEMBER	28	Victoria	Sivaranjini J	Meenakshi Jayan, Sreeshma Chandran, Darsana Vikas, Steeja Mary	KSFDC	
DECEMBER	5	Kalamkaval	Jithin K. Jose	Mammootty, Vinayakan, Gayatri Arun, Rajisha Vijayan, Shruti Ramachandran, Megha Thomas, Gibin Gopinath	Mammootty Kampany	
DECEMBER	5	Pongala	A B Binil	Sreenath Bhasi, Yami Sona, Baburaj, Alencier Ley Lopez	Global Pictures Entertainment	
DECEMBER	5	Khajuraho Dreams	Manoj Vasudev	Sharaf U Dheen, Arjun Ashokan, Sreenath Bhasi, Aditi Ravi, Dhruvan, Chandhunadh	Goodline Productions	
DECEMBER	5	Madhura Kanakku	Radheshyam V	Hareesh Peradi, Indrans, Amina Nijam, Nisha Sarang, Sanuja Somnath	Hareesh Peradi Productions, N M Movies	
DECEMBER	5	The Ride	Ritesh Menon	Sudhi Koppa, Ann Seethal, Sreekanth Murali, Maala Parvathi	Diaspore Entertainment	
DECEMBER	5	Dheeram	Jithin T Suresh	Indrajith Sukumaran, Aju Varghese, Nishanth Sagar, Sagar Surya, Reba Monica John, Divya Pillai, Avanthika Mohan	Remo Entertainmentz; Malabar Talkies	
DECEMBER	7	Uduppu	Anil Mukhathala	Indrans, Sona Nair, Sudheer Karamana	Janasurya Cinemas	
DECEMBER	12	Adinaasam Vellapokkam	A.J. Varghese	Shine Tom Chacko, Lizabeth Tomy, Babu Antony, John Vijay, Manju Pillai	Surya Bharathy Creations	
DECEMBER	12	Ambalamukkile Visheshangal	Jayaram Kailas	Gokul Suresh, Lal, Ganapathi S. Poduval, Mareena Michael Kurisingal	Chand Creations	
DECEMBER	12	Sree Ayyappan	Vishnu Venjaramoodu	Riyaz Khan, Aneesh Ravi, Kottayam Ramesh, Kudassanad Kanakam	Aadhi Media, Nisha Productions	
DECEMBER	18	Bha Bha Ba	Dhananjay Shankar	Dileep, Vineeth Sreenivasan, Dhyan Sreenivasan, Sandy, Balu Varghese, Sidharth Bharathan	Sree Gokulam Movies	
DECEMBER	19	Eliza	Athul Ranganath	Shibin Jose, Sreeshna Suresh, Bheeman Raghu, Alamkritha, Dileep Bal	Shivani Movies	
DECEMBER	20	Themmadi Kunnile Thanthonnikal	Robin Joseph	Aadhi Anuchan, Anagha Jose, Varsha Prasad, Saju Navodaya, Sohan Seenulal	B Cinemas, Plamban FIlms	
DECEMBER	20	Eraan	Shiju Balagopalan	Premalatha, Purushothaman, Abhijith Ct Chooliyad, Vyshakh Kuttikrishnan, Shyam Krishnan, Vinod Niduvaloor	Sajumon AC Productions	
DECEMBER	25	Sarvam Maya	Akhil Sathyan	Nivin Pauly, Aju Varghese, Janardhanan, Preity Mukhundhan, Riya Shibu	Central Pictures	
DECEMBER	25	Mindiyum Paranjum	Arun Bose	Unni Mukundan, Aparna Balamurali, Jude Anthany Joseph, Jaffar Idukki, Maala Parvathi	Allens Studios, Jugar Studios	
DECEMBER	25	Aghosham	Amal K. Joby	Narain, Rosmin Thadathil, Dhyan Sreenivasan, Aju Varghese	C N Global Movies	
DECEMBER	25	Paralokam	Bidhin Bal	Bhaskaran Kavumthara, Bidhin Bal	Machucando Films	
DECEMBER	25	Haal	Veeraa	Shane Nigam, Sakshi Vaidya, Johny Antony, Madhupal, Sangita Madhavan Nair	JVJ Productions	
DECEMBER	31	Moksha Crisis	Ajay Sekhar	Gokulnath, Thamban Kodakkad	Malabar Cinemas	
