= Kerala Film Critics Association Awards 2025 =

49th Kerala Film Critics Association Awards
- Organised by: Kerala Film Critics Association

Highlights
- Best Film: Eko
- Most awards: Lokah Chapter 1: Chandra

The 49th Kerala Film Critics Association Awards, honouring the best Malayalam films released in 2025, were announced in April 2026.

== Winners ==
Film Awards
Category	Winner(s)	Film
Best Film	Dinjith Ayyathan	Eko
Best Director	Dominic Arun	Lokah Chapter 1: Chandra
Best Actor	Mohanlal	Thudarum, Hridayapoorvam
Best Actress	Kalyani Priyadarshan	Lokah Chapter 1: Chandra
Best Actress	Anaswara Rajan	Rekhachithram, Mr & Mrs Bachelor
Second Best Film	Jofin T. Chacko	Rekhachithram
Best Supporting Actor	Prakash Varma	Thudarum
Best Supporting Actor	Dileesh Pothan	Ronth
Best Supporting Actress	Honey Rose	Rachel
Best Supporting Actress	Subha Wayanad	Shanti: The Reflection of Truth
Special Jury Award (Acting)	Manoj Govindan	Periyon
Special Jury Award (Acting)	Sangeeth Prathap	Hridayapoorvam
Special Jury Award (Acting)	Sandeep Pradeep	Eko
Special Jury Award (Acting)	Twinkle Joby	A Pregnant Widow
Special Jury Award (Acting)	Meenakshi	Private
Best Child Artist	Dharmik Sudhakaran	Pachatheyyam
Best Child Artist	Devananda Jibin	Kalyanamaram
Best Debut Actor	Riya Shibu	Sarvam Maya
Best Story	G. R. Indugopan	Ponman
Best Screenplay	Rajesh Thillankeri	A Pregnant Widow
Best Debut Screenplay	Santhy Balachandran	Lokah Chapter 1: Chandra
Best Lyricist	Mahesh Gopal	Mr & Mrs Bachelor
Best Lyricist	Murali Neelambari	Vadu: The Scar
Best Music Director	Jakes Bejoy	Narivetta, Lokah Chapter 1: Chandra
Best Male Playback Singer	Navaneeth Unnikrishnan	"Vidaparayam" (Hridayapoorvam)
Best Female Playback Singer	Sithara Krishnakumar	"Minnalvala" (Narivetta)
Best Female Playback Singer	J. R. Divya Nair	"Madhuramayoru Kokila Naadam" (Nerariyum Nerath)
Best Cinematographer	Muhammed A	Thanthapperu
Best Editor	Praveen Prabhakar	Kalamkaval
Best Sound Mixing	M. R. Rajakrishnan	L2: Empuraan
Best Art Director	Sunil Lavanya	Jagala
Best Make-up Artist	Ronex Xavier	Lokah Chapter 1: Chandra
Best Costume Design	Minima Shaji	Moonnam Nombaram
Best Children's Film		Daivathan Kunnu
Best Children's Film		Pachatheyyam
Best Debut Directors	Jithin K. Jose	Kalamkaval
Best Debut Directors	Sharan Venugopal	Narayaneente Moonnaanmakkal
Best Debut Directors	Prashanth Vijay	Ithiri Neram
Best Debut Directors	Manoj Govindan	Nobody
Best Debut Directors	Shaju Valappan	Shadow Traders
Best Film for National Integration		Khidki Gaav
Best Women's Film		Victoria
Best Environmental Film		Kalyanamaram
Best Environmental Film		Bhoothalam
Best Socially Relevant Film		Ariku
Best Socially Relevant Film		Swalih
Best Biblical Film		Moonnam Nombaram
Best Original Films		Samastha Lokah
Best Original Films		Mindiyum Paranjum
Best Original Films		Moonwalk
Best Original Films		Chinna Chinna Aasai
Best Original Films		Karuthal
Best Popular Film		Sarvam Maya
Best Other Language Film		Parasakthi

Special Honours
Category	Recipient(s)
Chalachitra Ratnam Award	M. G. Sreekumar
Ruby Jubilee Award	Priyadarshan
Chalachitra Prathibha Award	T. G. Ravi, Indrans, Kaithapram Damodaran Namboothiri, Kalliyur Sasi, Urmila Unni, B. Arundhati
