= Corona Dhavan =

2023 Malayalam film by CC Nithin

- Theatrical release poster
- Directed by: C.C. Nithin
- Written by: Sujai Mohanraj
- Produced by: James John; Jerome John
- Starring: Lukman Avaran; Sreenath Bhasi; Johny Antony; Irshad Ali; Sruthy Jayan; Seema G. Nair
- Cinematography: Janeesh Jayanandan
- Edited by: Ajeesh Anand
- Music by: Rijo Joseph
- Production companies: James & Jerome Productions
- Distributed by: Magic Frames
- Release date: 4 August 2023
- Running time: 130 minutes
- Country: India
- Language: Malayalam

Corona Dhavan is a 2023 Indian Malayalam-language comedy film directed by C.C. Nithin in his directorial debut and written by Sujai Mohanraj. The film stars Lukman Avaran and Sreenath Bhasi in the lead roles, alongside Johny Antony, Irshad Ali, Sruthy Jayan and Seema G. Nair. The story is set in Anathadam village and revolves around a group of alcoholics who face difficulties getting liquor during the COVID-19 lockdown.

Corona Dhavan is produced by James John and Jerome John under the banner of James & Jerome Productions. The cinematography and editing are handled by Janeesh Jayanandan and Ajeesh Anand. The music is composed by Riji Joseph, while the background score is by Bibin Ashok. The original title of the film was Corona Jawan, but the Central Board of Film Certification asked that it be altered. The film received an A certificate and was released in theatres on 4 August 2023 to mixed response.

== Plot ==
Aanathadam is small village in Kerala with a big population of alcoholics. Most of the inhabitants cannot get by without booze every day. Vinu is an unemployed youth in the village with a mother and elder sister. Their family is actively looking for alliances for their daughter and finalizes a proposal from an NRI. Preparations are underway for the wedding when Vinu's friends demand him to arrange at least 45 bottles of their favorite brand Dhavan for the wedding party. On the night of the wedding, Vinu's sister elopes with his friend Suni, taking away all the gold for marriage. On the same night, the prime minister declared lockdown in the country due to the outbreak of Covid pandemic. Since the marriage or party did not happen and Vinu still has the stock of 30 odd bottles with him, everyone in the village starts calling him for booze. Vinu, who is humiliated and bitter due to the happenings refuses to give the bottles to anyone. He finishes some bottles himself and stows away the rest when he realizes that people have started getting desperate for liquor due to the unavailability and will pay anything for the same.

Godson the local don is desperate for liquor, since his brother Gladson, a bigtime alcoholic, is creating a ruckus in his life because of the unavailability of liquor. He tries to get some bottles from the local bar owner but fails when the excise SI Satyajit foils his plans and closes the bar. Satyajit is hell bent on confiscating all the illegal hooch and liquor in the region and has some old personal scores to settle with Godson as well. He foils Godson's attempt of getting liquor from Kochi as well when he arrests Godson's henchman Durbalan and puts him behind bars. Meanwhile, Gladson gets more and more hysterical and even attempts drinking sanitizer for alcohol content and raid the neighbor's sample liquor bottle collection unsuccessfully.

The corrupt excise officer Sabu at Satyajit's station is desperately looking to get some bottles as well, since he took around 30 bottles from the mainour stock in the station for his personal use and is at the risk of getting exposed when Satyajit started demanding the stock list of liquor at the station to verify. Both Godson and Sabu come across Vinu's Facebook post in a liquor group, posing with all his bottle stash and decide to get hold of it at any costs. Sabu raids Vinu's house unsuccessfully to find the bottles since Vinu had already shifted the bottles to some other location. Godson sends his acquaintance Harish Pengan to strike a deal with Vinu for the bottles. Vinu gets his friend Sabumon to sabotage Sabu's jeep brakes in exchange for some liquor and gets him admitted to hospital to avoid any further issues from the excise.

In a parallel track, SI Rocket Shibu from the local police station launches a drone survey of the area to find anyone breaking the social distancing / quarantine laws regulations during the lockdown. The drone catches Vinu's neighbor Sumesh and Sumesh's friends who have got hold of a liquor bottle with great difficulty and are having it in public discreetly. During the ensuing chaos, everyone in the gang runs away separately and Sumesh strikes down the Drone itself with the empty liquor bottle out of fear that the police will catch him. He takes away the drone with him in a bid to not let the police have any evidence. Drone's owner cum operator Manu starts pestering Rocket Shibu to get back his drone as it his only means of livelihood. Shibu starts combing the neighborhood one by one to get back the Drone. Sumesh, fearing that the police will retrieve the drone somehow, disposes it off in his neighbor Vinu's well, listening to his friend's advice not to let Police get to the Drone and avoid any legal complications to Sumesh. He also starts a rumor in the village among the locals and his friends circle that Vinu is Covid positive, to avoid anyone going to his house and not to risk anyone finding out about the drone.

Vinu's lover Swapna gets an alliance at home and her parents are on the verge of finalizing it. Both Vinu and Swapna plan to elope and Vinu accepts Godson's deal through Harish Pengan to sell off the liquor bottles. He plans with Swapna to meet at a hilltop where he will exchange the bottle for cash and then leave from there. Vinu then retrieves the bottles from the nearby pond where he had stashed them at the bottom. He hides the bottles in bags and covers them with spinach to avoid any suspicion. However, one of the locals who had a grudge against Vinu for not inviting him to his sister's marriage, rats him out to Satyajit and passes on their rendezvous point after following Vinu.

Godson meanwhile had struck a deal with Rocket Shibu to arrest him first before Satyajit does, in case Satyajit and excise department foil the deal, since he fears Satyajit is waiting for a chance to settle his old scores with him. He promises to pay Shibu for Manu's lost drone if the deal goes well. Just as Vinu is about to exchange the bottles for Godson's gang, both Satyajit and Shibu arrive at the spot. At the same time Health Department officials barge in between and take Vinu captive because of the village rumors of him being Covid Positive. They dispose and burn all the liquor bottles due to the risk of getting infected, much to the dismay of Gladson's Gang, Shibu and the locals including Sumesh who were direly in need of liquor. At the hospital Vinu finds out that rumors somehow turned out to be real and he is indeed covid positive, having contacted the infection from his friend Sabumon who came from fort kochi to help him sabotage the jeep. Sumesh also goes and tests since he was Vinu's neighbor and close contact and finds himself to be positive as well. Both spend their quarantine days in the hospital and come out. By that time, Swapna, believing in the social media rumors about covid affected patients risking impotency, agrees to the arranged marriage and gets married off as per her earlier alliance. Gladson loses his mental balance due to the prolonged dry state without alcohol by the time Durbalan is released from jail. Satyajit finds out about Sabu's malpractice and gets him suspended from service. Manu, who was upset at the loss of his Drone leaks the footage video to a local channel causing much embarrassment to Rocket Shibu and he eventually gets transferred to Attapadi. The liquor shops have opened again much to the relief of villagers and Vinu and Sumesh celebrate with them boozing, promising themselves to start off again with a clean slate.

== Cast ==
- Lukman Avaran as Dhavan Vinu
- Sreenath Bhasi as Paambu Gladson
- Johny Antony as Sathyajith alias Karikku Sathya, Excise Sub-inspector
- Irshad Ali as SI K. Shibu alias Rocket Shibu
- Sruthy Jayan as Swapna
- Seema G. Nair as Sumithra
- Dharmajan Bolgatty as Sabumon
- Vijilesh Karayad as Manu
- Sunil Sukhada as Priest of the Church
- Shivaji Guruvayoor as CI Antony Thomas
- Sarath Sabha as Sumesh
- Bitto Davis as Godson
- Balaji Sharma as Sabu P. K., Excise officer
- Unni Nair as Pappan
- Aneesh Gopal as Kuttan
- Sinoj Varghese as Durbhalan
- Vineeth Thattil as Bar Muthalali
- Harish Pengan
- Latheef Salman as Shukoor

== Soundtrack ==
Corona Dhavan

Soundtrack album by Rijo Joseph
- Released: April 25, 2023
- Venues: Chennai, Kochi, Mumbai
- Studios: Euphony Studio; Freddy's Audio Video Garage; 2 Bar Q Studios; NHQ Studios
- Genre: Feature film soundtrack
- Length: 9:42
- Language: Malayalam
- Label: Magic Frames Music

The film's music is composed by Rijo Joseph and the background score is by Bibin Ashok. The lyrics are written by Suhail Koya, Manu Manjith, and Ajeesh Dasan. The audio launch was done by Unni Mukundan and Vinay Forrt in a function held at Kochi on 25 April 2023.

Track listing
No.	Title	Lyrics	Singer(s)	Length
1.	"Kannu Kuzhanje"	Suhail Koya	Mathayi Sunil, Lukman, Johny Antony	3:08
2.	"Thalakirukku"	Ajeesh Dasan	Anthony Daasan	3:11
3.	"Vattam Vattam Chuttathe"	Manu Manjith	Arun Ashok, Neelima PR	3:23

== Release ==
=== Theatrical ===
The film which was initially planned to be released on 28 July 2023 was later postponed. It was then released in theatres on 4 August 2023 by Magic Frames owned by Listin Stephen.

=== Home media ===
Saina Play acquired the digital rights and began streaming it on 20 October 2023.

=== Title dispute ===
The initial title of the film was Corona Jawan which was later changed by the makers of the film due to some technical reasons. According to the officials of the Central Board of Film Certification, the title 'Jawan' had to be removed from the film as it is a popular liquor brand in Kerala and the use of the word would help promote the brand.

== Reception ==
=== Critical response ===
Shilpa Nair Anand of The Hindu wrote "With its multiple plotlines and many characters, debutant director CC's movie seems more like a series of episodes than a cohesive narrative." Vignesh Madhu of The New Indian Express gave 2.5 out of 5 stars and wrote "Corona Dhavan is not a film where you pay attention to the themes explored or the development of character arcs. But some of its issues are too glaring to ignore."
