= Perumani =

- Theatrical release poster
- Directed by: Maju
- Written by: Maju
- Produced by: Firoz Thairinil
- Starring: Sunny Wayne; Vinay Forrt; Lukman Avaran
- Cinematography: Manesh Madhavan
- Edited by: Joel Kavi
- Music by: Gopi Sundar
- Production companies: The Maju Movies; Une Vie Movies
- Release date: 10 May 2024
- Country: India
- Language: Malayalam

Perumani is a 2024 Indian Malayalam language satire dark comedy film written and directed by Maju featuring Sunny Wayne, Vinay Fort, and Lukman Avaran in the lead roles. The film was released on 10 May 2024 and received mostly positive reviews. The film streamed on Saina Play from August 21st, 2025 onwards.

== Cast ==
- Lukman Avaran as Abi
- Vinay Forrt as Nassar
- Sunny Wayne as Muji
- Deepa Thomas as Fathima
- Vijilesh Karayad
- Usha Chandrababu as Abhi's mother
- Radhika Radhakrishnan as Ramlu
- Navas Vallikkunnu
- Franco Francis

== Reception ==
Film critic Sajesh Mohan, writing for Onmanoramas Cinemascape column, described Perumani as "a fantasy village that feels uncomfortably real," noting that the film "mirrors present-day India through its satirical treatment of class divisions, religion, and superstition," and praising Vinay Forrt's performance as Nassar, comparing it to Thalathil Dineshan from Vadakkunokkiyantram (1989).

Review by SR Praveen in The Hindu described the film as "fairly engaging" with a wacky tone and an "aftertaste of a folktale", praising its visual design and moments of magical realism while noting that the narrative sometimes drifted off balance.

The Times of India called Perumani "an enjoyable introspection into society" that offers a "special experience" with nostalgic visuals and strong performances, while noting that some humour fell flat and parts of the narrative felt stretched.
