= Vala: Story of a Bangle =

2025 Indian-Malayalam language film

- Directed by: Muhashin
- Written by: Harshad
- Produced by: Fairbay Films
- Starring: Vijayaraghavan; Lukman Avaran; Dhyan Sreenivasan; Shanthi Krishna; Raveena Ravi; Sheethal Joseph
- Cinematography: Afnas V.
- Edited by: Siddique Hyder
- Music by: Govind Vasantha
- Production company: Fairbay Films
- Distributed by: Wayfarer Films; AGS Cinemas; Phars Film
- Release date: 19 September 2025
- Running time: 131 minutes
- Country: India
- Language: Malayalam

Vala (transl. Bangle): Story of a Bangle is a 2025 Indian Malayalam-language action comedy drama film directed by Muhashin and written by Harshad. The film stars Vijayaraghavan, Lukman Avaran, Dhyan Sreenivasan, Shanthi Krishna, Raveena Ravi and Sheethal Joseph. It is produced by Fairbay Films. Afnas V. handles the cinematography and Siddique Hyder edits the film. Govind Vasantha composes the songs and background score.

Vala: Story of a Bangle was released theatrically on 19 September 2025. The film received mixed-to-negative reviews and was a major flop at the box office.

== Cast ==
- Vijayaraghavan as Soopika
- Lukman Avaran as Banu Prakash
- Dhyan Sreenivasan as Purushothaman Nair
- Shanthi Krishna as Pathoocha
- Raveena Ravi as Sarala P. Nair
- Sheethal Joseph as Vishalakshi
- Arjun Radhakrishnan as Indresh Kumar IPS
- Navas Vallikkunnu
- Shafi Kollam
- Gokulan
- Abu Salim
- Yusuf Madappen
- Ibrahim Al Balushi
- Govind Vasantha as Swaminathan

== Production ==
Principal photography of the film was begun on 3 April 2024 and the filming completed on 11 November 2024.

== Soundtrack ==
Vala: Story of a Bangle

Soundtrack album by Govind Vasantha
- Released: 19 September 2025
- Recorded: 2024
- Studios: Jovi Records, Chennai; 20db Studios, Chennai; Sonic Island, Ernakulam; K7 Studio, Ernakulam; OM NHQ, Ernakulam; The Mystic's Room, Chennai
- Genre: Feature film soundtrack
- Length: 11:44
- Language: Malayalam
- Label: Think Music

The soundtrack album of the film is composed by Govind Vasantha. Think Music procured the audio rights of the soundtrack. The first single Ikleeli was released on 5 August 2025. The second single Thankam was released on 14 August 2025. The third single Daastaan teaser was released on 22 August 2025.

No.	Title	Lyrics	Singer(s)	Length
1.	"Ikleeli"	Umbachy	Yawar Abdal	03:06
2.	"Thankam"	Siju Thuravoor	Swathi Das Prabhu	02:52
3.	"Daastaan"	Yawar Abdal	Yawar Abdal	03:16
4.	"Arike"	Rafeeq Ahamed	K. S. Chithra	03:48
Total length:				11:44

== Release ==
The title poster of the film was released 25 July 2025. The teaser of the film was released on 6 September 2025 and the trailer was released on 13 September 2025.

Vala: Story of a Bangle was released theatrically on 19 September 2025 through Wayfarer Films (Kerala), AGS Cinemas (Tamil Nadu) and Phars Film (GCC).

=== Home Media ===
The film's digital rights were acquired by Saina Play. The film started streaming from November 13 onwards.

== Reception ==
=== Critical reception ===
Shilpa Nair Anand of The Hindu stated that Vala: Story of a Bangle "fails to capitalise on an interesting idea." She praised the cast performances, but criticised that the characters lacked depth. She also criticised the slow pacing of the first half. She said the second half "lays bare the action, and most of the whys and hows are answered."

Swathi P. Ajith of Onmanorama stated that Vala: Story of a Bangle is "a gleaming idea dulled by uneven execution." The film's tone "often tips to melodrama", which makes the audience distant. The cast's performance was praised. She criticised the film for its clichés, uneven structure, and "reluctance to dig deeper into the flaws it hints at."

Anandu Suresh of The Indian Express rated the film 2/5 stars, praising the performance of the cast, "good stunt" choreography, cinematography, and editing, which executed the three physical altercation scenes. He criticised poor comedy, the ending as "underwhelming," the inconsistencies and abruptness of Bhanu and Purushothaman's character arc, the themes of caste and communal politics not being explored beyond superficiality and the portrayal of Sarala and Vishalakshi leaning to "sexist stereotypes" as "gold-diggers."

Vivek Santhosh of Cinema Express gave the film 1.5/5 stars and wrote, "What begins as a quirky mystery around an ancient bangle soon collapses into sluggish pacing, tone-deaf writing and a laboured morality tale few will care about."
