= Jithin K. Jose =

Indian film director and screenwriter

- Occupations: Film director; Screenwriter
- Years active: 2021-present
- Known for: Kurup (2021); Kalamkaval (2025)

Jithin K. Jose is an Indian film director and screenwriter who works primarily in Malayalam cinema. He began his career as a story writer and assistant director on the 2021 biographical crime thriller Kurup, and made his directorial debut with the 2025 psychological crime thriller Kalamkaval, starring Mammootty and Vinayakan.

== Career ==
Jithin K. Jose started his film career aspiring to be a writer, collaborating with director Srinath Rajendran on Kurup (2021), starring Dulquer Salmaan, where he was credited as a story writer and assistant director.

In 2025, he made his directorial debut with Kalamkaval, a psychological crime thriller co-written by him and Jishnu Sreekumar. Produced by Mammootty Kampany, the film featured Mammootty and Vinayakan in lead roles and was released in December 2025.

His second directorial venture, Mayan: Chapter 1, a fantasy horror thriller starring Jayasurya and Nyla Usha and co-written with Rafi, is scheduled for theatrical release in December 2026.

== Filmography ==
Year	Title	Director	Writer	Notes
2021	Kurup	No	Story	Also assistant director
2025	Kalamkaval	Yes	Yes	Directorial debut
2026	Mayan: Chapter 1	Yes	Yes	

== Awards and nominations ==
Year	Award	Category	Film	Result	Ref.
2026	Shafi Memorial Award	Best Debut Director	Kalamkaval	Won	
2026	South Indian International Movie Awards	Best Debutant Director - Malayalam	Kalamkaval	Nominated	
