= Kundannoorile Kulsitha Lahala =

- Directed by: Akshay Ashok PK
- Written by: Akshay Ashok PK
- Produced by: Cadre Cine Creations
- Starring: Lukman Avaran; Veena Nair; Dasettan Kozhikode; Asha Madathil; Jain George; Adhin Ollur; Suneesh Sami
- Cinematography: Fajju Av
- Edited by: Aswin B
- Music by: Melvin Michael
- Distributed by: Cadre Cine Creations
- Release date: 24 October 2024
- Country: India
- Language: Malayalam

Kundannoorile Kulsitha Lahala is a 2024 Indian Malayalam-language masala film directed by Akshay Ashok PK and produced by Aji P Joseph under the banner of Cadre Cine Creations. The film stars Lukman Avaran, Veena Nair, Dasettan Kozhikode, Jain George, Asha Madathil and Adhin Ollur. The film's music is composed by Melvin Michael. The film, which was set to release on December 8 2023 was delayed and released on 24 October 2024 instead. The film’s digital partner is Saina Play and released via Saina Play on 11 July 2025. The film did receive a U/A certificate from CBFC. The film was heavily panned by critics and audiences and became a major box office disaster.

== Cast ==
- Lukman Avaran as Ajanathan
- Veena Nair as Mary
- Dasettan Kozhikode as Dasan
- Anjana Prakash as Vilasini
- Jain George as George
- Asha Madathil as Susheela
- Adhin Ollur as Sreekuttan
- Suneesh Sami as Suneesh
- Pradeep Balan as Member

== References/Release ==
Release

Theatrical Release:

The film was initially set for release on December 08, 2023 but was delayed and instead released on October 24, 2024 in theaters worldwide.

Home Media:

The film’s digital partner is Saina Play and the film released via Saina Play on July 11, 2025, after Sthanarthi Sreekuttan, another Malayalam film that released via Saina Play before KKL.
