= Narudi Brathuku Natana =

2024 Indian Telugu-language film by Rishikeshwar Yogi

- Theatrical release poster
- Directed by: Rishikeshwar Yogi
- Written by: Rishikeshwar Yogi
- Produced by: TG Vishwa Prasad; Sukumar Boreddy; Dr. Sindhu Reddy
- Starring: Shivakumar Ramachandravarapu; Nithin Prasanna; Shruthie Jayan; Aiswarya Anil Kumar
- Cinematography: Fahad Abdul Majeed
- Edited by: Rishikeshwar Yogi
- Music by: NYX Lopez
- Production companies: People Media Factory; S Square Cinemas; C For Apple Productions
- Release date: 25 October 2024
- Running time: 125 minutes
- Country: India
- Language: Telugu

Narudi Brathuku Natana is a 2024 Indian Telugu-language slice of life drama film written and directed by Rishikeshwar Yogi, and produced by People Media Factory. The film features Shivakumar Ramachandravarapu, Nithin Prasanna, Shruthie Jayan and Aiswarya Anil Kumar in important roles.

The film was released on 25 October 2024.

A rich boy with a successful father is not able to get into films even with his father's references. His father wants him to stop acting but he persists. He is not able to accept negative feedback. After a failed audition, in frustration he causes an accident. He does not feel any remorse for causing this. His only friends scolds him saying that he doesn't deserve his privilege. So, he leaves home goes to Kerala, gets robbed, makes new friends, has new experiences, finds his passion and comes back.

== Cast ==
- Shivakumar Ramachandravarapu as Satya
- Nithin Prasanna as D. Salman
- Shruthie Jayan as Lekha
- Aiswarya Anil Kumar as Mounika, Salmaan's former lover
- Viva Raghav as Satya's friend
- Dayanand Reddy as Satya's father

== Production ==
The film was originally titled as Natasamrat but was renamed to the current name. It was extensively shot in Kerala.

== Music ==
The background score and soundtrack were composed by NYX Lopez.

All music is composed by NYX Lopez.

Track listing
No.	Title	Lyrics	Singer(s)	Length
1.	"Cheppaleni Allaredho"	Chitran	Ananthu	2:22
2.	"The Kerala Song"	Adarsh Kumar Aniyal	Alphons Joseph	3:14
3.	"The Break Up Anthem"	Chitran	Mohit Shyam, Mithun Tangutoori	2:18
4.	"Poraadu"	Chitran	Sean Roldan	4:40

== Release ==
Narudi Brathuku Natana was initially scheduled to release on 26 April 2024, but was later released on 25 October 2024 for unknown reasons.

== Reception ==
BH Harsh of The New Indian Express gave a rating of 3.5 out of 5 praised the screenplay and plot while stating "Shiva Ramchandravarapu and Nithin Prasanna rise to the occasion with their performances and carry a fluid narrative about discovering one's humaneness". Suhas Sistu of The Hans India called it "a soulful tale of life" and gave a rating of 3 out of 5.
