= License (film) =

2023 Indian film by Ganapathi Balamurugan

- Theatrical release poster
- Directed by: Ganapathi balamurugan
- Written by: Ganapathi balamurugan
- Produced by: Natarajan jeevanantham
- Starring: Rajalakshmi; Vijay Bhaarat; Radha Ravi
- Cinematography: Kasivisvanathan Chelladurai
- Edited by: Veronica Prasad
- Music by: Baiju Jacob
- Production company: JRG productions
- Release date: 3 November 2023
- Running time: 114 minutes
- Country: India
- Language: Tamil

License is a 2023 Indian Tamil-language women-centric, social awareness film written and directed by Ganapathi Balamurugan. The film stars Rajalakshmi, Vijay Bhaarat, Radha Ravi and Natarajan Jeevanantham in the lead roles. The film was produced by Natarajan Jeevanantham under the banner of JRG productions.

== Cast ==
- Radha Ravi as Thirunavukkarasu
- Rajalakshmi Senthil as Bharathi
- Natarajan Jeevanantham as Sivakadatcham
- Vijay Bhaarat as Bhaarat
- Abi Nakshatra as teenage Bharathi
- Pala. Karuppiah as minister of Law
- Dhanya Ananya as Inthira
- Deepa Shankar as Annamal
- Geetha Kailasam as the judge
- Vaiyapuri as Head constable
- Namo Narayana as Alavanthan
- Aditi Balamurugan
- Jeeva Ravi as DSP

== Production ==
The film was produced by Natarajan Jeevanantham under the banner of JRG productions. The cinematography was done by Kasivisvanathan Chelladurai, while editing was handled by Veronica Prasad. The Trailer for the film was released on 28 May 2023. The film noted debuted for Rajalakshmi and Vijay Bhaarat

== Reception ==
A critic from Maalai Malar rated 2 3/4 out of 5 and wrote "Although it is a good story, the director is a bit confused in the way he has come to tell it.".Thanthi TV critic gave mixed reviews.
