= Biju Pappan =

Indian actor

- Born: Biju Pappan; 24 March 1969 (age 57); Kannanmoola, Kerala
- Occupation: Actor
- Years active: 1993 – present
- Spouse: Sheeba

Biju Pappan (born 9 March 1969), is a Malayalam actor. His career began with movies and television serials in the early 1990s. Pappan gained fame by portraying antagonistic characters in various movies, including Naran and Kayyoppu, which were financial successes. He has appeared in over forty-five films.

== Early life (1969–90) ==
Biju Pappan was born in Kannanmoola, Thiruvananthapuram district, to M. S. Kumari and the late M. P. Padmanabhan of the Mudumbil family. Biju has two brothers, Saju and Baiju and a sister Siji. Biju's father, Padmanabhan has served as a councillor of Thiruvananthapuram for 35 years and held the office of Mayor of Thiruvananthapuram on five occasions. He was a prominent communist leader in Kerala and was also involved in theatre activities, collaborating with several artists, including Malayalam actor Madhu.

Pappan attended the St. Mary's school and later enrolled in Govt Technical High School (THS) Nedumangad. Later, he attended Sree Narayana Polytechnic in Kottiyam for his diploma in Civil Engineering. He was elected as the General Secretary, cine arts club secretary and sports general secretary of the college. He was an inter-poly champion in all throwing events. During the college days, he was closely associated with cultural events that later inspired him to enter art and movies.

== Personal life ==
Biju Pappan married Sheeba on 15 January 1998 and had two sons, Karthik and Krishna.

== Early years (1993–2012) ==
Biju Pappan made his acting debut in 1993, with the film Samooham by Sathyan Anthikkad. He also made a breakthrough in television serials such as Valsalyam, Thaali, Vava, Kavyanjali and Sthree Oru Santwanam.

== Filmography ==
Key
†	Denotes films that have not yet been released

- All films are in Malayalam language unless otherwise noted.

Year	Title	Role	Notes
1993	Samooham	Jayan	
1994	Commissioner	Prabhakaran	
1995	Indian Military Intelligence		
1995	Simhavalan Menon		
1995	Boxer		
1996	Tom & Jerry		
1997	Guru	Raghuraman's friend	
2005	Achuvinte Amma		
2005	The Tiger	Sundaran	
2005	Naran	Mattancherry Sivankutty	
2006	Mahasamudram	Mathews	
2006	Pothan Vava	Philipose	
2006	Chinthamani Kolacase	Shanmughan	
2006	Pathaaka	C.I. Suresh	
2006	Baba Kalyani	C.I. Sarath	
2007	Time	Krishnan Nambiar	
2007	Kaiyoppu	SI Nadar	
2007	Nasrani	Unni	
2007	Janmam		
2007	Chotta Mumbai	S.I. Hameed	
2008	Sound of Boot	George Abraham	
2008	Ayudham	S.I. Vikraman	
2008	Madampi	S.I. Vincent	
2008	Twenty:20	Mukundan	
2009	I G	Mujeeb	
2009	Red Chillies	Satheeshan	
2010	Pramani		
2010	Yugapurushan		
2010	Oru Naal Varum	S.I. Mahendran	
2010	College Days		
2010	Drona 2010	Vasu	
2011	August 15	DGP Sethumadhavan	
2011	Sandwich		
2011	Collector	Soman	
2011	Indian Rupee	Jabbar	
2012	The King & the Commissioner	Ubaid Mohammed	
2012	Simhasanam	Jamal	
2012	Run Baby Run	Sukumaran Menon	
2012	I Love Me	Jayaraj	
2014	Mr Fraud		
2016	Kasaba	Raghavan	
2017	Puthan Panam	Ganeshan	
2018	Chanakyatanthram	Devarajan	
2019	Pattabhiraman	Aadhikeshavan	
2022	Aaraattu	Edathala Baby	
2022	Pathonpatham Noottandu		
2022	Monster	C.I Vijaykumar	
2022	Kaapa	Sashankan	
2023	Corona Papers		
2024	Njan Kandatha Sare		
2025	Mr & Mrs Bachelor	SI Madhu Babu	
2025	Kalamkaval	SP Thomas Abraham IPS	
2026	Varavu †	TBA	
