= Kuruthi =

2021 film by Manu Warrier

- Official release poster
- Directed by: Manu Warrier
- Written by: Anish Pallyal
- Produced by: Supriya Menon
- Starring: Prithviraj Sukumaran; Roshan Mathew; Naslen; Murali Gopy; Mamukkoya; Srinda; Shine Tom Chacko
- Cinematography: Abinandhan Ramanujam
- Edited by: Akhilesh Mohan
- Music by: Jakes Bejoy
- Production company: Prithviraj Productions
- Distributed by: Amazon Prime Video
- Release date: 11 August 2021
- Running time: 122 minutes
- Country: India
- Language: Malayalam

Kuruthi (transl. Ritual slaughter) is a 2021 Indian Malayalam-language neo-noir crime thriller film directed by Manu Warrier, written by Anish Pallyal, and produced by Supriya Menon through Prithviraj Productions. It stars Prithviraj Sukumaran and Roshan Mathew in the lead roles along with an ensemble cast including Naslen, Murali Gopy, Mamukkoya and Shine Tom Chacko. Jakes Bejoy composed the original songs and background score. The film is about how enduring human relations that transcends boundaries struggle to survive trials of hatred and prejudice.

Principal photography lasted about a month from December 2020 to January 2021. Kuruthi was scheduled to be released in theatres on 13 May 2021 but was postponed due to the COVID-19 pandemic. The film was released through Amazon Prime Video on 11 August 2021. The film received positive reviews for the Prithviraj's antagonistic performance and the main cast's performances, cinematography and screenplay.

== Plot ==
In the lonely mountains of Idukki, a grieving rubber tapper named Ibrahim lives with his father, Moosa and younger brother Rasool. Their quiet life is shattered one night when a wounded police officer, SI Sathyan, forces his way into their home with a handcuffed prisoner named Vishnu. Sathyan explains that Vishnu murdered a Muslim shopkeeper, and now a radical mob is hunting them down to kill Vishnu before he can reach a police station. The house is soon surrounded by these men, led by a dangerous extremist named Laiq and a local named Kareem. Ibrahim is shocked to realise that his own brother, Rasool, is secretly working with these extremists and wants Vishnu dead.

The tension turns into a bloody battle when Laiq enters the house and kills SI Sathyan. Before he dies, Sathyan makes Ibrahim promise on the **Quran** that he will keep Vishnu safe until help arrives in the morning. This puts Ibrahim in a painful position: he must protect a murderer against people of his own faith, including his brother. Throughout the night, the characters argue over religion and revenge, revealing that a neighbour, Sumathi, had been helping Vishnu, while Rasool’s hatred for Vishnu deepens.

After several violent fights and a dangerous chase through the dark forest, Ibrahim manages to fight off the attackers and eventually kills Laiq to fulfil his promise. He chooses his moral duty over communal hatred. However, the story ends with a dark message about the future. Though Ibrahim lets Vishnu go, he realises that the hatred has already been passed on. As the movie ends, Rasool—now fueled by the same venom as Laiq—corners Vishnu with a knife at a bridge, showing that the cycle of religious violence and revenge is far from over.

== Cast ==
- Prithviraj Sukumaran as Laiq
- Roshan Mathew as Ibrahim
- Naslen as Rasool
- Mamukkoya as Moosa Khader
- Murali Gopy as S.I. Sathyan
- Shine Tom Chacko as Kareem aka Kammu
- Srindaa as Sumathi
- Manikandan R. Achari as Preman
- Sagar Surya as Vishnu
- Navas Vallikkunnu as Umar
- M.S Mani as Ali Mudliyar
- Nazer Karutheny as Gafoor
- Navya Davy as Ibrahim's Wife
- Aiza Hassan as Ibrahim's Daughter
- Shamsudheen as Native in Mosque & Tea Shop
- Kumar as Native in Mosque & Tea Shop
- Jordi Joseph as Native in Mosque
- Muhammed Iruvattath as Native in Tea Shop
- Renith Elamadu as Police Constable Renjith
- Harris Desom as Native in Mosque
- Sujeed as Native in Mosque

== Production ==
Kuruthi marks director Manu Warrier's debut film in Malayalam, who had earlier directed Hindi film Coffee Bloom and have written TV series Yudh (both in 2014). Warrier describes the film as "a socio-political thriller that has got a bit of drama, action and thrilling elements [...] though Prithviraj plays the lead, all other characters have equal importance". The film was written by Anish Pallyal. After several discussions, Prithviraj and his wife Supriya Menon decided to produce the film under their banner Prithviraj Productions.

Principal photography of the film began on 9 December 2020 at Erattupetta, Kottayam district. Abhinandan Ramanujam was the cinematographer. The filming completed on 4 January 2021 in a single schedule which lasted only less than a month. Movie song "Vetta Mrigam" released August 6, by Prithviraj in Instagram.

== Release ==
Kuruthi was scheduled to be released in theatres on 13 May 2021 but was postponed due to the COVID-19 pandemic. The film was released through Amazon Prime Video on 11 August 2021 as an Onam Release.

== Reception ==
Baradwaj Rangan of Film Companion South wrote "This cast elevates what could have been a routine thriller into something much larger. Kuruthi is a solid film that shows how you can make big statements even within the confines of genre."
