= No Man's Land (2021 Malayalam film) =

- Directed by: Jishnu Harindra Varma
- Written by: Jishnu Harindra Varma
- Produced by: Buddha Corner Films
- Starring: Lukman Avaran
- Cinematography: Pavi K Pavan
- Edited by: C.R. Sreejith
- Music by: Joy Jinith, Sam P Francis
- Distributed by: Amazon Prime Video
- Release date: 19 November 2021 (India)
- Country: India
- Language: Malayalam

No Man's Land is a 2021 Indian Malayalam independent thriller film directed by Jishnu Harindra Varma and starring Lukman Avaran, Sreeja Das and Sudhi Koppa in lead roles.

The film is Jishnu Harindra Varma's directorial debut. It was released through Amazon Prime Video in 2021.

== Cast ==
- Lukman Avaran as Mathayikutty
- Sreeja Das as Sumithra
- Sudhi Koppa as Ahmed
- Kavya Bellu as Anjali
- Aquib Zaman as Ameer
- Thomas G. Kannampuzha as Ravi
- Jijo Jacob as Vimal
- Anu Krishna as Ram
- Shafeek Karim as Sunil

== Reception ==
A very mixed review in The Hindu states that No Man's Land "explores the deep realms of human emotions, the narrative treads into subjects that are more dark and sinister as the plot thickens" but adds that this "experimental affair (...) misses the mark". Another review judges that "it belongs to those pretentious and half-baked single-location ideas that got to see the light due to the pandemic."
