= Ariku =

2025 Indian Malayalam language film

- Directed by: V. S. Sanoj
- Written by: V. S. Sanoj
- Starring: Senthil Krishna; Irshad Ali; Dhanya Ananya
- Cinematography: Manesh Madhavan
- Edited by: Praveen Mangalath
- Music by: Bijibal
- Release date: 28 February 2025
- Country: India
- Language: Malayalam

Ariku is a 2025 Indian Malayalam-language family drama film written and directed by V. S. Sanoj and produced by the Kerala State Film Development Corporation (KSFDC). The film portrays social change and persistent inequalities in Kerala through the lives of three generations of a Dalit family. It received the award for the Best Socially Relevant Film in the Kerala Film Critics Association Awards 2025.

== Development ==
The film Ariku was made as part of the Kerala government's project to fund films by members of the Scheduled Castes/Scheduled Tribes community. The film written and directed by journalist V. S. Sanoj, with Jobby Varghese co-writing the screenplay and dialogues, was produced by the Kerala State Film Development Corporation (KSFDC) with a reported budget of ₹1.5 crore. Filming was completed after a 26-day schedule across Kollengode, Kerala and Lucknow, Uttar Pradesh.

Manesh Madhavan handled the cinematography, Praveen Mangalath the editing, and Gokul Das the art direction, while Bijibal composed the background score.

== Plot ==
The film portrays social change and persistent inequalities in Kerala through the lives of three generations of a Dalit family, through Koran, his son Shankaran and granddaughter Shikha, spanning the period from 1964 to 2025 (release year).

The film begins against the backdrop of the 1964 split in the Communist Party of India. Kandan Koran, an active party worker deeply distressed by the split, has a son during this period and names him Shankaran, reflecting his political convictions. As Shankaran grows up, the film explores the persistence of caste discrimination through his experiences, including caste-based discrimination in education and the allocation of lump-sum grants at school. It also examines reservation-related prejudices among people who profess progressive ideals and caste-based attitudes in romantic relationships.

As an adult, Shankaran encounters contradictions between the progressive ideals professed by individuals and their personal attitudes towards caste and relationships. His work at a media organisation also brings him into conflict with its internal contradictions, creating dilemmas between his professional responsibilities and personal convictions.

The third generation is represented by Shankaran's daughter, Shikha. Her experiences bring contemporary issues, including discrimination based on skin colour, into the narrative. When she moves to North India for higher education, the film explores the persistence of caste discrimination beyond Kerala.

== Cast ==
- Senthil Krishna as Koran
- Irshad Ali as Shankaran
- Dhanya Ananya as Shikha

== Release ==
The first-look poster of the film was released on 4 February 2025 and shared by actor Prithviraj Sukumaran on his Facebook page. It was released in theatres on 28 February 2025. From April 2025, the film has started streaming on the C-Space OTT platform, launched by the state government through the Film Development Corporation.

== Reception ==
Cris of The News Minute described Ariku as an important film for encouraging conversations about caste discrimination and the persistence of caste prejudices despite social progress, while criticising its uneven first half and background score.

Jithin of ManoramaOnline praised the performances of the three lead actors, Senthil Krishna, Irshad Ali and Dhanya Ananya. He particularly highlighted Senthil Krishna's portrayal of Koran across three different stages of life and Irshad Ali's performance as Shankaran. He also appreciated the contributions of the technical team, particularly the cinematography, art direction and background score. Bindu P. P. of Asianet News praised Sanoj for addressing caste discrimination and its impact on Dalit communities. A review published in Deshabhimani praised Ariku for its in-depth exploration of the subtle ways caste operates in everyday life and across different social contexts in Kerala.

== Awards and honours ==
Ariku received the award for the Best Socially Relevant Film in the Kerala Film Critics Association Awards 2025.
