= Saudi Vellakka =

2022 Malayalam film

- First look poster
- Directed by: Tharun Moorthy
- Written by: Tharun Moorthy
- Produced by: Sandip Senan
- Starring: Devi Varma; Lukman Avaran; Binu Pappu; Dhanya Ananya; Sujith Shanker
- Cinematography: Sharan Velayudhan Nair
- Edited by: Nishadh Yusuf
- Music by: Palee Francis
- Production company: Urvasi Theatres
- Release date: 2 December 2022 (Kerala)
- Country: India
- Language: Malayalam
- Budget: ₹3.10 crores
- Box office: ₹8.30 crores

Saudi Vellakka CC.225/2009 is a 2022 Indian Malayalam-language crime drama film, written and directed by Tharun Moorthy. The film stars Lukman Avaran, Devi Varma, Binu Pappu, Sujith Shankar, Dhanya Ananya. The film was produced by Sandip Senan under the banner Urvasi Theatres. This film earned many awards and nominations including the National Film Award for Best Malayalam Feature Film.

Saudi Vellakka was released on 2 December 2022 to positive reviews from critics.

== Plot ==
Twenty-three-year-old Abhilash's dream of a Gulf visa is about to come true but a court summons for a long-pending case throws a wrench in his plans. He must now get to the bottom of a small conflict between neighbours that has snowballed into a legal fight before his dream is destroyed.

Abhilash is a techie at Bangalore whose mother Kala receives a summons at their home back in Kerala in his name. The constable Kurian calls him up and report immediately to the station sternly. Movie flashes back 10 years back during his travel to Kerala. Abhilash, who is a kid, is growing up with his parents and sister. He is shown as worrying over his tooth which is about to fall and trying to remove it himself at times. He goes to play cricket at the rooftop of Radhakrishnan with his friends. His shot with a vellakka hits Ayisha on her head while she was coming back from the ration shop after a tiff with her daughter in law Naseema. In a fit of rage she hits the kid Abhilash on his face which causes the already loose tooth to fall out and him spurting some blood. He is admitted to hospital soon and the issue is escalated by Radhakrishnan who is Aiysha's neighbor and was looking for getting back at her family following their plot boundary wall issue.

Abhilash's parents file a case against Ayisha for hurting a minor. Ayisha is arrested by the police and taken to the court due to the serious nature of the charges leveled against her. Her son Sathar and his friend Britto bail her out with advocate Shenoy's help.

She's berated and humiliated by Abhilash's uncle when she tries to visit Abhilash at the hospital and apologize. After 2 years her bail gets cancelled as they do not reply to the summons or follow-ups from the court. At this point Sathar and Naseema quarrel over going forward with the legal case as she has had a past bitter experience of her father fighting a case for her now convicted brother.

Sathar finally leaves his mother with her brother staying at another town without any choice. He breaks down at his helplessness and goes missing thereafter. Ayisha cannot stay at her brother's house due to his own family pressure and she starts living alone. She tries to find advocate Shenoy to move forward with the case proceedings, but learns that he has already died when she visits his home. One of his juniors Gokulan who is in dire need of cases and money approaches Ayisha and gets her new bail with two false witnesses.

Ayisha starts making eatables at her new place and selling them locally to financially support her day to day and case expenses. Years pass on and magistrates come and go with little progress in her case due to several reasons like complainants not showing up, case file getting lost etc. among the others. When the newly appointed strict magistrate issues an ultimatum to present all the case related persons soon, Abhilash gets the summons and call shown at the movie beginning and comes back home. He desperately wants to end this long pending issue and get to work.

They try to find Radhakrishnan to appear for the case but find that he's now paralyzed and bedridden after relocating to some other area. Abhilash himself and another witness change their old statements at court and turn hostile to end the case and save Ayisha. Gokulan manages to cancel the charge against minor and judge finally sentences her to 5000 Rs fine and imprisonment for one day till the court ends. Abhilash offers to pay the money and finally reconciles with her. When she faints at the court canteen while with him and is hospitalized, he decides to take her home and look after her which is finally agreed by his family also who patch up with her.

== Cast ==
- Devi Varma as Ayisha Rowther (Voice dubbed by Pauly Valsan)
- Lukman Avaran as Abhilash Sashidharan
- Binu Pappu as Britto Vincent
- Sujith Shanker as Sathar
- Dhanya Ananya as Naseema (Voice dubbed by Srinda Arhaan)
- Gokulan as Advocate Gokulan
- Remya Suresh as Kala
- Vincy Aloshious as Manju
- Nilja K. Baby as Anumol
- Riya Saira as Public Prosecutor
- Shiny T. Rajan
- Devaki Rajendran as Anitha Radhakrishnan
- Nayana Narayanan
- Kumar Sethu
- Mallikarjun Devaramane
- Dhanush Varghese
- Sidhartha Siva as Adv. Shenoy
- Abu Valayankulam as Police Constable Kurian
- Kurien Chacko
- Sajeed Pattalam as Bose Thankappan
- Manju Vani
- Vinod Sagar as Magistrate

== Production ==
=== Development ===
The film was announced by Tharun Moorthy, the director of the film, on 26 December 2021 by sharing the first look poster of the film through his Instagram handle. Some other notable actors like Dileep and Asif Ali were also shared the first look poster.

The second look poster of the film was released on 3 February 2022.

== Marketing ==
The official teaser of the film was released on 28 April 2022 in YouTube.

== Music ==
No.	Title	Lyrics	Music	Singer	Length
1.	"Pakalo Kaanaathe"	Joe Paul	Palee Francis	Job Kurian	3:55
2.	"Chaayum Veyil"	Anwar Ali	Palee Francis	Bombay Jayashri	3:19

== International film festivals ==
- Saudi Vellakka was screened in Indian panorama section of 53rd International Film Festival of India (IFFI). The film opened to positive reviews at the festival.
- The film was selected for 21st Dhaka International Film Festival.
- The film was shown at 20th Chennai International Film Festival(CIFF) as Indian Panorama.

== Release ==
The film was scheduled earlier for release on 20 May 2022, however, the film was postponed due to unknown reasons.

The film released in theatres on 2 December 2022.

== Reception ==
S.R. Praveen critic of The Hindu wrote that "Tharun Moorthy's sophomore effort is emotionally impactful". Sajin Shrijith critic of Cinema Express gave 4 stars out of 5 and stated that "Saudi Vellakka foregoes the stylish, urban mood of the former in favour of a more grounded, performance-heavy storytelling. Not that Operation Java didn't have terrific performances, but if you felt that film lacked strongly in the emotional department, you might find Saudi Vellakka compensating for it in spades". V Vinod Nair critic of Times of india gave 3 stars out of 5 and stated that "Saudi Vellakka shows that you can create a good movie that talks about the real issues of the society without superstars or big banners".

== Awards ==
Award	Category	Winner
70th National Film Awards	Best Malayalam Feature Film	Sandip Senan
70th National Film Awards	Best Female Playback Singer	Bombay Jayasri
Kerala State Film Awards	Best Character Actress	Devi Varma
Kerala State Film Awards	Best Dubbing Artist	Pauly Valsan
