= Dayom Panthrandum =

- First look poster of Dayom Pantharndum
- Directed by: Harshad PK
- Written by: Harshad PK
- Starring: Abu; Lukman Avaran; Manish Acharya; Ukru D Poshini; Shinto Stanley
- Cinematography: Kannan Patteri
- Edited by: Rajesh Ravi
- Music by: Baiju Dharmajan
- Production company: Tempora Talkies
- Release date: 10 October 2013
- Country: India
- Language: Malayalam

Dayom Panthrandum is a 2013 Malayalam-language Indian feature film directed by Harshad PK, starring Abu, Ukru D Poshini, Manish Acharya, Lukman Avaran, Akhil V and Shinto Stanley. The film was released on 10 October 2013.

== Plot ==
The film shares several characteristics with the game such as its unpredictability, adventure, thrill - all rolled into one. The film is about a group of youngsters who set out on a mission. They travel far and wide. While four of them are in a car, the 'Boss' of the group is on a bike, alone, as if expecting a pillion rider at any moment. They meet a tribal man who falls in their focus as well as their camera's. The new entrant guides them to new twists and turns. He guides them from the ease and comfort of film making to the harshness of reality which the forest unfolds.

== Cast ==
- Abu as Boss
- Ukru D Poshini as Muthoran
- Lukman Avaran as Red
- Manish Acharya as Oscar
- Akhil V as Sufi
- Shinto Stanley as Chatterji
