= Dhanya Ananya =

Indian actress

- Born: Dhanya Ananya; Meerut, Uttar Pradesh
- Occupations: Actress, theatre artist
- Years active: 2019-present

Dhanya Ananya is an Indian actress, who works in Malayalam film industry. She made her Malayalam film debut in 2019 and got breakthrough for her performance in Nalpathiyonnu. Dhanya later played notable character roles in the Malayalam films including critically acclaimed Ayyappanum Koshiyum, Jana Gana Mana and Saudi Vellakka.

== Career ==
Dhanya Ananya completed degree in journalism from Mar Ivanios college, Thiruvananthapuram. During her college days, Dhanya acted in short films and numerous music videos. She also started to explore acting, which led her to pursue MA Theatre studies from Sree Sankara University, Kalady. Later she acted in independent movies such as Heart of Dog directed by Krishnan K. P, The Checkpost (Hindi) which was an Iranian-Orian venture directed by Hazan Nazer, Aandaal directed by Shareef Easa and KOPFKINO directed by Veena Leela Bharathi. KOPFKINO was screened at the New York Indian Film Festival in 2017. In the theatre production Thuramukham directed by Gopan Chitambaran, she played the character Umanii.

Dhanya first gained attention for her role as Suma in the 2019 Malayalam film 41. She was noted for her role as Jessy in Ayyappanum Koshiyum. Dhanya went onto play character roles in several films. Her performance in Jana Gana Mana and Saudi Vellakka (2022) was acclaimed by critics.

== Filmography ==
Key
†	Denotes films that have not yet been released

Year	Title	Role	Notes	Ref.
2019	Nalpathiyonnu (41)	Suma	Debut	
2020	Ayyappanum Koshiyum	Jessy		
2021	Operation Java	Janaki		
2022	Bheeshma Parvam	Elsa		
2022	Jana Gana Mana	Vidya		
2022	Saudi Vellakka	Naseema		
2023	License	Inthira		
2025	Ariku	Shikha		
2025	Kalamkaval	Abhija		
