= Lukman Avaran =

Indian actor

- Born: 22 May 1990 (age 36); Changaramkulam, Kerala, India
- Education: Royal College of Engineering & Technology
- Occupation: Actor
- Years active: 2013–present
- Spouse: Jumaima

Lukman Avaran (born 22 May 1990) is an Indian actor who primarily works in Malayalam cinema. His debut film is Dayom Panthrandum (2013) was the first theatre-released film in his career. Lukman acted the lead role in the film Operation Java (2021) directed by Tharun Moorthy. He was mainly noted for his performances in the films Shibu (2019), Virus (2019), Thallumaala (2022), and Saudi Vellakka (2022).

== Early and personal life ==
Lukman Avaran was born in Changaramkulam, Malappuram, Kerala, to Koladikkal Avaran and Haleema. He is a B.Tech. graduate from the Royal College of Engineering & Technology, in Chermanangad, Thrissur. He married Jumaima on 20 February 2022.

== Career ==
His acting career was started by a short film Kittuo (2013). His first silver appearance was Dayom Panthrandum (2013) Written by Harshad PK and Muhsin Parari, Directed by Harshad PK and this movie wasn't released in theatres. His first notable performance was in the movie KL10 Patthu (2015) Written & Directed by Muhsin Parari.

In 2019, his role in Unda of a police officer from an Adivasi community, Biju Kumar was noticed by the audience. In 2021, Operation Java Written & Directed by Tharun Moorthy, Lukman had a major role as Vinaya Dasan along with Balu Varghese. In the following years, he performed many supporting characters in many films. He played pivotal roles in Thallumaala (2022) along with Tovino Thomas by Khalid Rahman and also in the Tharun Moorthy's second film Saudi Vellakka (2022) along with Binu Pappu. The film Saudi Vellakka was screened under Indian Panorama segment of IFFI 53.

== Filmography ==
Year	Title	Role	Notes	Ref
2013	Dayom Panthrandum	Red	Screened at the Kochi-Muziris Biennale (KMB) and other film festivals	
2014	Sapthamashree Thaskaraha	Hotel boy		
2015	KL 10 Patthu	Nasarullah		
2016	Style			
2016	Valleem Thetti Pulleem Thetti	Filament Philip		
2016	Kali	Bank Customer		
2017	Hadiyya	Lukman		
2017	C/O Saira Banu	Sound System Operator		
2017	Godha	Jabir		
2017	Udaharanam Sujatha	Sajeev		
2018	Sudani from Nigeria	Rajesh		
2018	French Viplavam			
2019	O P 160/18 Kakshi Amminippilla	Suran		
2019	Shibu	Habeeb		
2019	Unda	PC Biju Kumar		
2019	Virus	Dr. Sajith		
2020	Forensic	Vinod		
2021	Anugraheethan Antony	Ramanan		
2021	Operation Java	Vinaya Dasan		
2021	No Man's Land	Mathayikkutty		
2021	Churuli	Moonji		
2021	Ajagajantharam	Thara		
2022	CBI 5: The Brain	Muthukoya		
2022	Archana 31 Not Out	Prasad		
2022	Naaradan	Ameer		
2022	Aaraattu	Rocky		
2022	Aanaparambile World Cup	Muneer		
2022	Saudi Vellakka	Abhilash Sashidharan		
2022	Thallumaala	Jamshi		
2023	Aalankam	Pookkal		
2023	Sulaikha Manzil	Ameen Kasim		
2023	Jackson Bazaar Youth	Appu		
2023	Corona Dhavan	Dhavan Vinu		
2024	Anchakkallakokkan	Vasudevan		
2024	Perumani	Abi		
2024	Kundannoorile Kulsitha Lahala	Ajnjathan		
2025	Alappuzha Gymkhana	Antony Joshua		
2025	Vala: Story of a Bangle	Banu Prakash		
2025	Athi Bheekara Kaamukan			
2026	Disco	TBA		

== Awards ==
Lukman Avaran awards and nominations
Awards and nominations
Award	Wins	Nominations
Prem Nazir Samskarika Sahithi Award	1	0
Kerala Film Critics Association Awards	1	0

Totals (Note: Certain award groups do not simply award one winner. They acknowledge several different recipients, have runners-up, and have third place. Since this is a specific recognition and is different from losing an award, runner-up mentions are considered wins in this award tally. For simplification and to avoid errors, each award in this list has been presumed to have had a prior nomination.)
- Wins: 2
- Nominations: 0

Year	Award	Work	Ref
2023	Prem Nazir Samskarika Sahithi Award	—N/a	
2023	Kerala Film Critics Association Special Jury Award	Saudi Vellakka	
