= Communist Pacha Adhava Appa =

2025 Indian film

- Directed by: Shamim Moideen
- Written by: Ashif Kakkodi
- Produced by: Salwan
- Release date: 3 January 2025
- Running time: 116 minutes
- Country: India
- Language: Malayalam

Communist Pacha Adhava Appa is a 2025 Indian Malayalam-language comedy-drama film directed by Shamim Moideen and written by Ashif Kakkodi. It stars Zakariya in his first leading role.

== Plot ==
The story follows Wahid, who returns to his rural hometown during the COVID-19 lockdown and reconnects with his community and love of cricket. As neighborhood cricket matches become a focal point for local tensions, Wahid navigates personal and societal conflicts, discovering that meaningful change often begins from within.

== Cast ==
- Zakariya
- Sajin Cherukayil
- Nazlin Jameela Saleem
- Althaf Salim
- Abhiram Radhakrishnan
- Sarasa Balussery
- Ranji Kankol

== Production ==
Filming began in Kozhikode, Kerala, with Zakariya taking on his debut lead acting role. The screenplay was written by Ashif Kakkodi, known for the collaborations with Zakariya on Halal Love Story and Momo in Dubai. The film's music is composed by Sreehari K Nair, with cinematography by Shafi Koroth and editing by Shafeeque VB. It was produced by Salwan under the banner of Haritha Entertainments LLP.

== Release ==
Communist Pacha Adhava Appa was released in Indian theatres on 3 January 2025.

== Reception ==
The New Indian Express described the film as a "sluggish narrative" that fails to build on its promising premise, criticizing the pacing and lack of cohesion in its themes. The review concluded that despite its ambitions, the film "fumbles heavily with its execution," giving it 1.5 out of 5 stars.

Samayam Malayalam rated 3/5, noting that while the film attempts to explore political and social themes through its rural setting and cricket backdrop, its execution and messaging may not fully resonate with all viewers.
