= Leech (2025 film) =

Indian Malayalam-language action film

- Produced by: Anoop Rethna
- Starring: Anoop Rethna; Megha; Sandya Nair
- Cinematography: Arun T Sasi
- Edited by: Alvin Tomy
- Music by: Kiran Jose
- Production company: Book of Cinema Productions
- Distributed by: SFC Ads
- Release date: 14 March 2025
- Country: India
- Language: Malayalam

Leech is a 2025 Indian Malayalam-language action film written and directed by S. M. The film stars Anoop Rethna, Megha, and Sandya Nair in the lead roles. It is produced by Anoop Rethna under the banner of Book of Cinema Productions.

== Cast ==
- Anoop Rethna as Karthi
- Megha as Megha
- Sandya Nair as Sandy
- Nizam Calicut as Akbar
- Kannan Viswanathan as Philip
- Zuhail Sulthan as Anand
- Bakkar as George

== Production ==
The film is written and directed by S M, while the technical team consists of Arun T Sasi as the cinematographer, Alvin Tomy as the editor and Kiran Jose as the music director.

== Reception ==
Regarding the Tamil dubbed version, a critic from Dinamalar wrote: "The film puts forward the idea that women should not always allow themselves to be surrounded by loneliness. The cinematographer Arun T. is commendable for showing the forest beautifully. The music director Kiran Jose has composed the background score well." Regarding the same version, a reviewer of Maalai Malar stated: "Admirable. Although the characters do not speak much in the film, the background music is used throughout the film. The weakness of the film is the lack of compelling scenes". Dinakaran critic also gave a mixed review of the same version.
