= Uttavar =

2025 Indian Malayalam-language film

- Directed by: Anil Dev
- Written by: Anil Dev
- Produced by: Anil Dev
- Starring: Arun Narayanan; Athira Sudheer; Jishnu Vijayan Nair; Saji Sopanam; Roy Mathew
- Cinematography: Mridul S
- Edited by: Fazil Razak
- Music by: Ramgopal Harikrishnan
- Production company: Film Fantasy Productions
- Release date: 14 March 2025
- Country: India
- Language: Malayalam

Uttavar is a 2025 Malayalam language film, directed by Anil Dev in his directorial debut, starring Arun Narayanan, Athira Sudheer and Jishnu Vijayan Nair. The film was released on 14 March 2025 with positive reviews.

The film also won the Aravindan Puraskaram special jury award for the best director.

== Summary ==
Uttavar tells the story of a group of people fighting to be recognized as human beings in their homeland.

== Cast ==
- Arun Narayanan - Chandu
- Athira Sudheer - Padma
- Jishnu Vijayan Nair - Vishnu
- Saji Sopanam - Kumaran
- Roy Mathew - Govindan Nair

== Production ==
Anil Dev, the producer of Padagasalai, Aarvam and Dalamarmarangal, launched himself as the director with Uttavar. The trailer of the film was released on 5 March. Manorama Music released the first single, 'Vijanathayil thalararuthu nee' on 12 March. The second song, 'Maarilla veezhum vareyum...' was online on the same day of the film release.

== Reception ==
R B Sreelekha of Manorama Online stated that, 'the film is a direct look at the caste discrimination and extreme injustices that still exist in Kerala society, despite the progress of time', concluding as a 'worth watch film'.
