= Swapnasundari =

- Theatrical release poster
- Directed by: Philip.K.J
- Screenplay by: Seethu Anson
- Story by: Royitta Angamali; Kumar Zen
- Produced by: Subin Babu; Salam.B.T; Shaju. C. George
- Starring: Rajith Kumar; Jinto Body Craft
- Cinematography: Royitta - Sanoop
- Edited by: Greyson ACA
- Music by: Ajith Sukumaran; Hamsa Kunnatheri; Vishnu Mohanakrishnan; Femin Francis
- Production companies: S.S.Productions; Alphonse Visual Media
- Release date: October 31, 2025
- Country: India
- Language: Malayalam

Swapnasundari is a 2025 Indian Malayalam-language film directed by debutant Philip K. J. The film stars Bigg Boss fame Rajith Kumar as the leading actor. The principal photography of the film began in September 2020. Dr.Shinu Syamalan, who lost her job for reporting suspected COVID-19 case in Kerala makes her debut as heroine. Swami Gangeshananda, a bobbitisation victim, also plays an important role.

== Plot ==
Swapnasundari is a romantic film, where the story turns into a thriller with the mysterious deaths of some women and the investigation around it.

== Cast ==
- Rajith Kumar as Zachariah Punnoose
- Jinto Body Craft as John Zachariah
- Shinu Syamalan as Jamanthi
- Sajan Palluruthy as Sugunan
- Shivaji Guruvayoor as Arnold Jinto
- Sreeram Mohan as Selvan
- Rajee Thomas as Krishna's Wife
- Benny Punnaram as Krishnan
- Maneesha Mohan as Karishma
- Pradeep Palluruthy as Ramayyer
- Swami Gangeshananda as Swapnananda
- Sharlet Sajeev as Shanu's Love
- Sanif Ali as Shanu
- Divya Thomas as Vasanthi
- Shancy Salam as Janaki
- Sajid Salam as Kunjuse
- Sharon Sahim as Mridula Rose Mammen
- Bala Surya as Gopi Krishna
- Nishad Kallingal as Vishnu
- Sunny Sangamitra as Shuppandi
- Firos Babu as Arjun
- Janaki Devi as Jimikki Ammini
- Ajai Puramala as Pavitran

== Production ==
Subin Babu and Salam.B.T launched themselves into film production, supported by Shaju.C.George with Philip.K.J, a debutant helming the project with the leading man Rajith Kumar, a social activist and lecturer. Shancy Salam worked as production controller. Shinu Syamalen, a doctor by profession, was selected as the heroine in her debut. and Sreeram Mohan, grandson of veteran actor G.K.Pillai was signed to play a crucial supporting role, with newcomer Divya Thomas playing his pair. The cast and crew has several newcomers with the principal photography of the film started on 20 September 2020 at Thalayolaparambu. Soon Sharlet Sajeev was signed to play another heroine of the film, that had Poopara, Munnar and Abu Dhabi as major locations. Swami Gangeshananda, who became (in)famous because of a bobbitisation attack, also was penciled in to play an important role.

== Release ==
The release of the movie was delayed by three years and now the team is planning for a release on 31st October 2025.
