= Rajith Kumar =

Indian public speaker and reality TV contestant

Rajith Kumar.R
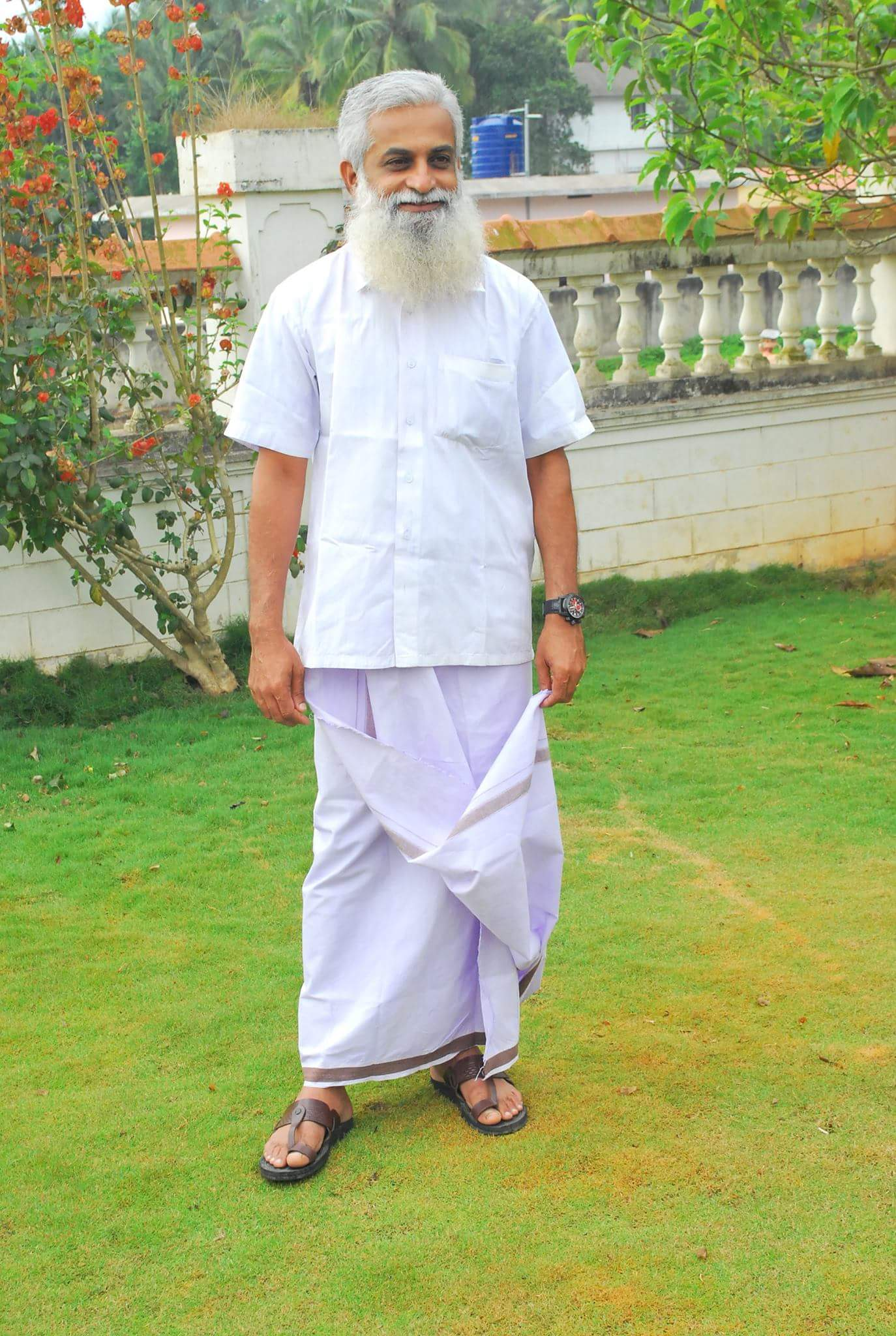
- Born: Attingal, Trivandrum, Kerala, India
- Occupations: Activist; public speaker; lecturer; actor

Rajith Kumar R. is an Indian lecturer, public speaker and actor from Kerala who worked at the Department of Botany, Sree Sankara College, Kalady.

In 2013, he gained attention for his making misogynistic comments during a speech at the Government Women's College, Thiruvananthapuram. This incident led to a backlash against him as well as the college authorities who had invited him. He has since made multiple comments that were criticized for being sexist, transphobic, unscientific and insensitive to people with disabilities which include claiming that women who wear jeans give birth to transgender children and that rebellious parents would have autistic children.

== Life and career ==
Born in Attingal in Thiruvananthapuram district of Kerala, Rajith Kumar graduated with a Bachelor of Science (BSc.) in Botany from Mar Ivanios College, Thiruvananthapuram and a Masters of Science (MSc.) in Botany from N. S. S. College, Pandalam. He then completed a Master of Philosophy (M. Phil) in cytogenetics and Doctor of Philosophy (PhD) in microbiology. He also has a Bachelor of Education (BEd) degree in natural science, a bachelor's degree in library and information science (BLIS), a master's degree (M.S) in psychotherapy, and a diploma in Vedanta. He has also passed the UGC NET examination.

He was a former teacher at Government Model Boys Higher Secondary School, Attingal and now works as a Junior Lecturer at the Department of Botany at Sree Sankara College, Kalady. He has authored several books and was awarded the Samoohya Saksharatha Prathibha Award by Kerala State Literacy Mission Authority, Government of Kerala.

== Controversies ==
In 2013, while speaking at Government College for Women, Thiruvananthapuram at the "moral education" campaign organised by the Department of General and Higher Education, he criticised women's current dressing style. It received media attention after a student protested by booing and boycotting the speech. Shobhana George complained against his statement in the Kerala State Human Rights Commission which asked the Collegiate Education Department to enquire into the matter. Deputy Director Girija Devi who conducted the enquiry reported that Kumar's speech was "a piece of art and the opposition by a graduate student to the speech was an immature response".

In 2018, in a counselling session held in Kasaragod he reportedly made the unscientific and misogynistic statement that women who wear jeans can give birth to transgender children and the children born to rebel men and women will be autistic, claiming to have scientific backing. He received rebuke, and it was pointed out in media that it was ill-informed, unscientific, and offensive. Kumar defended it saying that there are efforts to put him in bad light and only a certain portion from his 4-hour long speech was taken and is used to create misunderstanding among people. He reiterated and defended his statements again in the show Njangalkum Parayanund in Mathrubhumi News. Following that, health minister K. K. Shailaja released a press note barring Kumar from speaking in government programmes, citing that he spreads superstition and social discord. Although his statements has received criticism, he has also found support from a section of public. Following the 2020 coronavirus pandemic in Kerala, he said that he had a 'pure heart' and therefore he cannot be infected with coronavirus.

== Bigg Boss ==
In 2020, he entered the Bigg Boss house as a contestant in the reality television show Bigg Boss (Malayalam season 2) on Asianet. He was ousted from the show after he rubbed chilli paste on fellow contestant Reshma Nair's eyes. Reshma later revealed that she would file a police complaint against Rajith Kumar. Reshma claimed that she suffered corneal injury in one eye and her eyesight suffered.

When he was ousted from the show, his fans organized a public gathering to welcome him at Cochin International Airport. The gathering was organized despite the government's cautionary measures against the coronavirus pandemic. Rajith and 79 other people involved in the gathering were booked by the police for flouting government advisory on violating Covid Pandemic Regulations.

== Filmography ==
=== Films ===
| Year | Title | Role | Notes |
|---|---|---|---|
| 1992 | Maanyanmar | Hospital Staff | |
| 1998 | Manthrikumaran | Bank Employee | Malayalam Movie |
| 2015 | Manalchithrangal | Actor | Feature film |
| 2025 | Anti Christ | | |
| 2025 | Swapnasundari | Zachariah Punnoose | |
| 2022 | Eesho | Raveendran | Released on SonyLIV |
| 2022 | Autorickshawkarante Bharya | Traveller in auto | |
| 2024 | Nadikar | Security | |

=== Short films ===
| Year | Title | Role | Notes |
|---|---|---|---|
| 2018 | Daivathinte Naadu | Himself | Malayalam Short film |
| 2019 | Amma | The son | Musical video |

== Television ==
| Year | Title | Role | Channel | Notes |
|---|---|---|---|---|
| 2018 | Njangalkum Parayanund | Guest | Mathrubhumi News | |
| 2019 | Janakeiya Kodathi | Interviewee | 24 News | Episode 13 |
| 2020 | Bigg Boss (Malayalam season 2) | Contestant | Asianet | |
| 2020 | Veendum Chila Veetuviseshangal | Host | Asianet | |
| 2020–2021 | Life is Beautiful Season 2 | Alexy & Fernandez | Asianet | TV serial |
| 2021 | Parayam Nedam | Participant | Amritha TV | |
| 2021 | Star Magic | Participant | Flowers TV channel | |
| 2023 | Bigg Boss (Malayalam season 5) | Challenger | Asianet | |
| 2023 | Manimuthu | Doctor | Mazhavil Manorama | TV serial |
| 2026 | Akale | Devadathan | Zee Keralam | TV serial |
| 2026 | Bigg Boss Agnipareeksha | Guest Judge | Asianet | |

== Awards ==
- 2009: Samoohya Saksharatha Prathibha from Chirayinkeezhu panchayat and Kerala State Literacy Mission Authority.
- 2010: Rashtra Sevana Prathibha Puraskar from Global Confederation of Pravasee Malayalees
- 2017: Dr. Ambedkar Excellency Service National Award from Bharatiya Dalit Sahitya Akademi
- 2017: Samoohya Sevana Rathnam from Kerala Urban Development Council
- 2018: Gem of Kerala (Keralaratnam) from Global Confederation of Pravasee Malayalees
- 2018: Gurushreshta Puraskaram from Vanitha Congress (M)
- 2019: Shri. Vedavyasa Puraskaram from Bharatiya Dalit Sahitya Akademi
