= Sreeja Das =

Indian film Actress

- Born: Kochi, Kerala, India
- Occupations: Actress, Singer
- Years active: 1990– present

Sreeja Das is an Indian actress who appears in Malayalam cinema. Her acting career started in 2016 as Mariya Joseph in the film Action Hero Biju directed by Abrid Shine. Her breakthrough came in 2017 when she played the role of Appani Ravi's wife in the film Angamaly Diaries directed by Lijo Jose Pellissery. She played the female lead role for the first time in the film Karinkkannan directed by Pappan Narippatta, which was released in 2018.

== Filmography ==
Key
†	Denotes film or TV productions that have not yet been released

Year	Title	Role	Notes
2016	Action Hero Biju	Constable Maria Joseph	Debut film
2017	Angamaly Diaries	Ravi's wife	
2017	Take Off	Nurse Daisy	
2017	Pullikkaran Staraa	School teacher	
2017	Udaharanam Sujatha	Neighbour / Anitha	
2018	Aami	Maid Mini	
2018	Samaksham	Dr Sreeram's neighbour	
2018	Mandharam	Nazeer's friend wife	
2018	Karinkannan	Malavika	Debutant female lead
2019	Thottappan	Elsy	
2019	Makkana	Musliyar's daughter	
2019	Vikruthi	Sherin	
2021	Kaanekkaane	Sreekala	
2021	One	Celine	
2021	Vellam	Madhurima	
2021	No Man's Land	Sumithra	Female Lead
2022	Priyan Ottathilanu	Shobha	
2022	Heaven	ASI Sherin	
2022	Sabash Chandra Bose	Latha	
2022	Aanaparambile World Cup	Captain Kunju's mother	
2022	Aanandam Paramanandam	Asha	
2025	Paranu Paranu Paranu Chellan		
2026	Spa		
