= Orumbettavan =

2025 Malayalam film

- Starring: Indrans, Jaffar Idukki
- Release date: 3 January 2025 (Kerala)

Orumbettavan is a 2025 Indian Malayalam-language drama film directed by Sugeesh Dhekshinakashi. The film stars Indrans and Jaffer Idukki, with Sudheesh, Johny Antony in supporting roles. It was released theatrically on 3 January 2025.

== Plot ==
Mizhimol, an orphaned girl, finds comfort with her uncle Pappan, while Kelu, a reclusive craftsman and local villager, harbours resentment toward him. An unforeseen event shakes their village and sets off a narrative intertwining suspense, sacrifice, and justice.

== Cast ==
- Indrans as Kelukutty
- Jaffer Idukki as Pappan
- Johny Antony
- Sudheesh
- Dayyana Hameed
- Kashmeera Sugeesh
- I.M. Vijayan
- Sivadas Kannur

== Reception ==
Onmanorama praised the film for its emotional storyline and the performances of Indrans and Jaffer Idukki, noting its blend of family drama and mystery, while mentioning that the pacing felt sluggish at times.

The Indian Express Malayalam coverage indicated that the film had a lukewarm response upon release, highlighting its modest impact among early-2025 Malayalam cinema offerings.
