= Sruthy Jayan =

Indian actress

- Occupations: Actress; classical dancer
- Years active: 2017–present

Sruthy Jayan is an Indian actress who works predominantly on Malayalam cinema. She is also a trained classical dancer.

== Filmography ==
Key
†	Denotes films that have not yet been released

=== Films ===
- All films are in Malayalam, unless otherwise notes

List of Sruthy Jayan film credits
Year	Title	Role	Notes	Ref.
2017	Angamaly Diaries	Alice		
2017	Paippin Chuvattile Pranayam	Reshmi		
2018	Nithyaharitha Nayakan	Reshma		
2019	June	Maya		
2019	Sathyam Paranja Viswasikkuvo	Jessy		
2019	Janamaithri	CPO Pushpamol		
2021	Kaanekkaane	Tara Arun		
2021	Ellam Sheriyakum	Ajitha Narayanan		
2022	Heaven	Ancy John		
2022	Dahini: The Witch	Pallavi	Hindi film	
2022	Momo in Dubai	Class teacher		
2023	Iratta	Saradha		
2023	Kurukkan	S.I. Reena Mathew		
2023	Corona Dhavan	Swapna		
2023	Maharani	Kavya		
2024	Narudi Brathuku Natana	Lekha	Telugu film	
2025	Am Ah	Jincy		
2025	Chattuli			
2026	Vivaah			

=== Television ===
List of Sruthy Jayan web television credits
Year	Film	Role	Language	Network	Notes	Ref.
2019	Gods of Dharmapuri	Saroja	Telugu	ZEE5		
2019	Queen	Malar	Tamil	MX Player		
2023	Dhootha	Kalpana	Telugu	Amazon Prime Video		
2025	The Hunt: The Rajiv Gandhi Assassination Case	Dhanu	Hindi	Sony LIV		
2025	Pharma	Nirmala	Malayalam	JioHotstar		

=== Short films ===
List of Sruthy Jayan short film credits
Year	Film	Role	Notes	Ref.
2019	Iddah: The God's decision	Qamarunnisah		
2020	Go For A Girl	Pregnant wife		
