= Neelamudi =

2025 Indian Malayalam-language film

- Directed by: Sharath Kumar V
- Written by: Sharath Kumar V
- Release date: 26 January 2025
- Country: India
- Language: Malayalam

Neelamudi (English: Blue Hair) is a 2025 Indian Malayalam-language drama film written and directed by Sharath Kumar V.

== Plot ==
Set in a rural village, the film follows a group of young vloggers Sidhu, Paari, Sony, and Kannan, whose Independence Day prank involving blue coloured hair leads to unexpected and unsettling consequences, revealing how casteism and social bias persist in everyday life.

== Cast ==
- Subramanian
- Sreenath as
- Majeed P. Haneefa
- Adhithya Baby
- Aachuthanandan
- Surabhi MS
- Priya

== Release ==
The film was screened at the 28th International Film Festival of Kerala (IFFK) and later released on the streaming platform ManoramaMAX on 26 January 2025.

== Reception ==
India Times described the film as a "thought-provoking Malayalam drama that delves into caste-based discrimination in modern society, using social media as a backdrop".

The News Minute said that the film "casually exposes everyday prejudices".

Mathrubhumi, reviewing the film at the International Film Festival of Kerala, described Neelamudi as a relevant portrayal of caste based prejudice in contemporary society, noting that it begins as a story about a young vlogger and gradually develops into a stronger political statement.
