= Navas Vallikkunnu =

Indian actor

- നവാസ് വള്ളിക്കുന്ന്
- Citizenship: Indian
- Occupation: Actor
- Years active: 2018 - present

Navas Vallikkunnu is an Indian actor who works predominantly works in Malayalam Film Industry.

== Filmography ==
=== Films ===
Year	Title	Role	Notes	Ref.
2018	Sudani from Nigeria	Latheef		
2018	French Viplavam			
2019	Thamaasha	Raheem		
2020	Pachamanga			
2020	Kappela	Navas		
2020	Sufiyum Sujatayum	Shafeek		
2021	Innu Muthal	Chrekkalam Swami		
2021	Chathur Mukham	Basheer		
2021	Kuruthi	Umar		
2021	Pidikittapulli	Narendran		
2021	Madhuram	Vishnu		
2022	Randu			
2022	Four			
2022	Mahi			
2022	1744 White Alto			
2023	Vanitha	CPO Manoj		
2023	Higuita	Shareef		
2023	Binary			
2023	Jailer	Kammaran		
2023	Nadhikalil Sundari Yamuna	Shamsu		
2023	Imbam	Ahammed		
2023	Sesham Mike-il Fathima	Rafeeq		
2024	Perumani			
2024	Manorajyam			
2025	Anpodu Kanmani	Shukhoor		
2025	Am Ah	Subin (Tea Stall Owner)		
2025	Aap Kaise Ho			
2025	Abhilasham	Adv. Ajesh Alappat		

=== Web Series ===
Year	Title	Role	Platform	Notes	Ref.
2023-2025	Kerala Crime Files	CPO Sunil	Disney+ Hotstar	Seasons 1,2	
