= Mr & Mrs Bachelor =

2025 Indian film by Deepu Karunakaran

- Theatrical Release Poster
- Directed by: Deepu Karunakaran
- Written by: Arjun T. Sathyan
- Produced by: Prakash Highline
- Starring: Indrajith Sukumaran; Anaswara Rajan
- Cinematography: Pradeep Nair
- Edited by: Sobin Soman
- Music by: P. S. Jayahari
- Production company: Highline Pictures
- Release date: 23 May 2025
- Country: India
- Language: Malayalam

Mr & Mrs Bachelor is a 2025 Indian Malayalam-language romantic comedy film directed by Deepu Karunakaran and written by Arjun T. Sathyan. The film stars Indrajith Sukumaran and Anaswara Rajan in lead roles.

Mr & Mrs Bachelor was released in theatres on 23 May 2025.

== Plot ==
Stephy alias Anna, a bride-to-be, escapes from her house after her groom Sijin goes missing and embarks to find him. She meets Siddharth alias Siddhu, a carefree bachelor and a rich businessman in his 40s. The film follows their spontaneous journey together filled with humorous and emotional moments.

== Cast ==
- Indrajith Sukumaran as Siddharth "Siddhu" Narayanan
- Anaswara Rajan as Stephy "Anna" Immanuel
- Rosin Jolly as Aishwarya
- Dayyana Hameed as Divya
- Biju Pappan as SI Madhu Babu
- Rahul Madhav as Sijin
- John Jacob
- Sohan Seenulal
- Manohari Joy as Siddhu's mother
- Kudassanad Kanakam as Thressiamma, Stephy's grandmother
- Laya Simpson as Reena, Stephy's aunty
- Gibin Gopinath
- Deepu Karunakaran as Divya's husband

== Production ==
The film marks a collaboration between director Deepu Karunakaran and screenwriter Arjun T. Sathyan. Principal photography began in late 2024, with music composed by P. S. Jayahari.

== Release ==
The film was censored in August 2024 with U certificate. The film was initially scheduled for release on 23 August 2024 but was postponed due to production delays. Then it was scheduled to release on 9 May 2025 but again postponed. It was eventually released in theatres on 23 May 2025.

== Controversy ==
Prior to its release, the film was embroiled in a controversy when director Deepu Karunakaran accused lead actress Anaswara Rajan of not participating in promotional activities. He expressed his disappointment over her lack of support in promoting the film on social media platforms. Anaswara responded to these allegations, stating that she had fulfilled her promotional duties and was not informed about the film's release date. She also filed a complaint with the Association of Malayalam Movie Artists (AMMA) regarding the matter. The dispute was eventually resolved with the intervention of industry bodies FEFKA and AMMA, leading Anaswara agreeing to participate in the film's promotions.
