= Kalamkaval =

2025 film by Jithin K. Jose

- Theatrical release poster
- Directed by: Jithin K. Jose
- Written by: Jithin K. Jose; Jishnu Sreekumar
- Starring: Mammootty; Vinayakan
- Cinematography: Faisal Ali
- Edited by: Praveen Prabhakar
- Music by: Mujeeb Majeed
- Production company: Mammootty Kampany
- Distributed by: Wayfarer Films
- Release date: 5 December 2025
- Running time: 144 minutes
- Country: India
- Language: Malayalam
- Box office: est. ₹83 crore

Kalamkaaval: The Venom Beneath (or simply Kalamkaaval) is a 2025 Indian Malayalam-language psychological crime thriller film directed by debutant Jithin K. Jose, who also co-wrote the screenplay with Jishnu Sreekumar. The film is produced by Mammootty Kampany and stars Mammootty and Vinayakan along with Rajisha Vijayan, Gayatri Arun, Shruti Ramachandran and Gibin Gopinath, in supporting roles. The film's soundtrack album was composed by Mujeeb Majeed.

Kalamkaval was released in theatres on 5 December 2025. The film became a blockbuster and emerged as the fifth highest-grossing Malayalam film of 2025.

== Plot ==
The story focuses on a serial killer named Stanley Das, who mainly targets unmarried women. The film opens in 2005 Nagercoil. We are introduced to a middle aged man (later revealed as Stanley Das), who is a father of 2 kids. He takes his mistress to a hotel and kills her when she brings up the topic of marrying her after divorcing his current wife.

Movie shifts to 2012 Trivandrum, where Sub-Inspector Jayakrishnan investigates what initially appears to be a routine case of local unrest following the elopement of a young woman. As the inquiry deepens, Jayakrishnan begins noticing inconsistencies that suggest the incident is only a surface-level distraction. His team uncovers a long-running pattern of missing women across rural areas—divorced, widowed, or unmarried—each last seen with the same unidentified man. Further analysis reveals a disturbing alternation pattern: whenever a murder occurs in Kerala, the next takes place in rural Nagercoil. In between the investigations, we see scenes of the same middle aged man befriending the "missing" women on public buses, using them for sex, and killing them off in various ways, mainly by giving them cyanide laced pills under the pretext of preventing a possible pregnancy.

The investigation reveals that each victim's phone is used to lure the next, forming a continuous chain. To strengthen the probe near the inter-state region, the team brings in a Tamil police officer (who is fluent in Malayalam) posted at the closest jurisdiction near the Trivandrum–Tamil Nadu border—Stanley Das, who in fact is the actual killer. Stanley starts working with Jayakrishnan.

Despite trying multiple tactics to trap the killer, the team repeatedly fails, since Stanley knows Jayakrishnan's next step. Suspicion briefly falls on a fellow constable, Mani, when a victim's phone is discovered hidden in his bedroom, leading the team to believe they may finally have the culprit. Jayakrishnan tracks down Divya, one of Stanley's victims who managed to stay alive because she did not consume the cyanide laced pills. She looks at Mani's photo and says he is not her lover, much to Jayakrishnan's disappointment. Meanwhile, Stanley finds out about this, kills Mani and threatens Divya not to cooperate with the police.

Jayakrishnan then interrogates a bus conductor working in the route Divya used to take. The driver recalls seeing a man repeatedly traveling with Divya, and explains his facial features to a police sketch artist. Stanley hears about this and rushes to the spot afraid that the bus driver will expose him, but the sketch is of someone different.

Stanley attempts to kill his next victim, Shiny, by taking her to a lodge at Kottayam. Suspecting scrutiny from the cashier, he steps out under the pretext of smoking and unexpectedly encounters Jayakrishnan at the main counter. Jayakrishnan hands him a paper supposedly containing the suspect's sketch and Stanley is shocked to see his face in the sketch. We see a flashback of Divya and the bus driver actually recalling Stanley's face correctly, but Jayakrishnan hides that from Stanley. Knowing he is exposed, Stanley tries to kill Jayakrishnan, ending with Jayakrishnan overpowering Stanley and smashes his head on the floor and placing his presumably dead body into the trunk of his car. The film closes with the car driving away, only for the trunk to begin opening from the inside, indicating that Stanley is alive.

== Cast ==
- Mammootty as SI Stanley Das (Crime Branch, Tamil Nadu Police), (Based on Mohan Kumar. The main antagonist and the central character)
- Vinayakan as SI "Nath" Jayakrishnan (Special Branch, Kerala Police)
- Rajisha Vijayan as Divya
- Gayatri Arun as Shiny
- Dhanya Ananya as Abhijitha
- Shruti Ramachandran as Deepa
- Gibin Gopinath as Anand, Jayakrishnan's assistant
- Seema Sindhu Krishnan as Nisha, wife of Stanley Das
- Azees Nedumangad as SI Babu Vijayan
- Kunchan as Retd. Forensic Surgeon Joseph
- Biju Pappan as SP Thomas Abraham IPS
- Malavika Menon as Babitha
- Malavika Nair as Nandhini
- Megha Thomas as Sindu
- Vaishnavi Saikumar as Anagha
- Ilavarasu as Nandhakumar
- Kollam Thulasi as James, Anagha's father-in-law
- Sudhi Kozhikode as Anagha's brother-in-law
- Ranjini George as Leela
- Aravind SK as Vimal
- Bibin Perumbillikunnel
- Harisankar S. G.
- R. J. Sooraj as mobile shop owner
- Sindhu Varma as Sunitha
- Seema Sindhu Krishnan as Nisha
- Devadevan Vijayaraghavan as Bobby
- Abee Suhana as Vimala
- N. P. Nisa as Vidhya
- Mullayarasi as Pooja
- Amritha as Deepika
- Catherine Mariya as Mridula

== Production ==
=== Development ===
Reports for Mammootty's upcoming film came on 25 May 2024 soon after the release of his film Turbo. It will be directed by Jithin K. Jose in his directorial debut, who previously worked as a writer in the film Kurup. Other details on crew that included were cinematographer Jomon T. John and music director Sushin Shyam. In September 2024, Vinayakan was reported to play a prominent role in the film that brings together Mammootty and the former after a while, and was last acted together in Daivathinte Swantham Cleetus (2013). Their past works were in Big B (2007) and Best Actor (2010). As per reports, Vinayakan's role was originally meant for Prithviraj Sukumaran. Roby Varghese Raj's inclusion was also reported in 2024. Filming commenced on 25 September 2025, under the working title Production No. VII that marks the seventh production venture of Mammootty Kampany. The screenplay is co-written by Jishnu Sreekumar and Jithin K. Jose himself. The yet to be titled film's technical team after changes included cinematographer Faisal Ali and editor Praveen Prabhakar. Wayfarer Films will distribute the film in Kerala.

The official title Kalamkaval was announced by makers on 15 February 2025, that has a tagline "the venom beneath." The film would also have music composer Mujeeb Majeed while the action sequences are choreographed by stunt director Action Santhosh. Last year in an interview with John Brittas, Mammootty said that the film would be another attempt at experimenting with roles he had not done before.

=== Filming and casting ===
Filming started with a muhurth puja ceremony on 25 September 2024 in Nagercoil. Mammoooty joined the set on 2 October 2024. The film completed its shoot on 9 November 2024. It was extensively across locations in Tamil Nadu.

Rajisha Vijayan, who did her last role in Madhura Manohara Moham is one of the leading lady in her first association with Mammootty, making her comeback after 2 years. Gayatri Arun is another female lead in her second collaboration with Mammootty after One, where he played the role of the Chief Minister of Kerala. Gibin Gopinath, Shruti Ramachandran, Azees Nedumangad, Kunchan, Biju Pappan, Malavika Menon formed rest of the cast.

Director Jithin K Jose revealed that actor Prithviraj Sukumaran was initially considered for the role that Vinayakan has played. When Jithin narrated the script to Prithviraj, he suggested that in either of the roles, Mammootty could fit in. However, due to Prithviraj's busy schedule with L2 : Empuraan and other films during that time, Jithin looked for other options. It was then later Mammootty who recommended to give the role to Vinayakan.

== Music ==
Mujeeb Majeed composed the music for the film. Mammootty's grandson, Adyan Sayeed, sung the song "Redback" for the film in his second playback after Rorschach.

Kalamkaval

Soundtrack album by Mujeeb Majeed
- Released: November 2025
- Genre: Feature film soundtrack
- Length: 1:52

=== Track listing ===
No.	Title	Lyrics	Singer(s)	Length
1.	"Nilaa Kaayum"	Vinayak Sasikumar	Sindhu Delson	1:52
Total length:				1:52

== Marketing ==
The first look of the film was released on 16 February 2025. The second look was released on 20 April 2025. The official teaser was released on 28 August 2025. A pre-release teaser was released on 1 December 2025.

== Release ==
=== Theatrical ===
The film received a UA 16+ certification from CBFC. The film was likely to release in theatres on 9 October 2025, and then scheduled for a different date and was originally going to be on 27 November 2025. However, it was then postponed to 5 December 2025.

=== Box office ===
The film grossed over $3 million (₹26.87 crores in 2025) from GCC countries. A$150 thousand (₹88.77 lakhs in 2025) from Australia. The film sold over 1 million tickets on BookMyShow. The film grossed ₹75 crores in its 3rd week.

=== Home media ===
The post theatrical digital rights of the film is acquired by SonyLIV. The film began streaming on the platform from 16 January 2026.

== Reception ==
=== Critical reception ===
Kalamkaval received positive reviews from critics.

S. R. Praveen of The Hindu wrote, "Apart from fine performances from Mammootty and Vinayakan, mind games and character dynamics propel Jithin K Jose’s slow-burn thriller". Janani K. of India Today rated 3/5 and wrote, "Kalamkaval offers enough twists, strong performances, and atmospheric filmmaking to warrant a watch, even if the runtime tests patience occasionally." Anjana George of The Times of India rated 3/5 and wrote, "Kalamkaval is a film elevated by its lead actors and its atmospheric world, even if the storytelling occasionally falters. It remains a watch for Mammootty's enigmatic presence and the unsettling psychological duel at its core. Anandu Suresh of The Indian Express rated 2./5 and wrote, "Mammootty once again shows he's the biggest threat to stardom; but the crime thriller fails him".

Latha Srinivasan of NDTV rated 3.5/5 and wrote, "Technically, the film is sound with masterly editing, invigorating background and songs, and cinematography. There are numerous artistes who come in various roles but these are not fully explored. All in all, it is Mammootty's highly 'devilish' act against Vinayakan's underplayed cop role that makes this a compelling watch. Princy Alexander of Onmanorama wrote, " Kalamkaval may not reconstruct the full complexity of a true-crime tale. But as a cinematic experience, it delivers a dark, measured, and unnerving output." Sajin Shrijith of The Week rated 4.5/5 and wrote, "An unforgettable Mammootty and a sturdy Vinayakan in a haunting, surprise-laden thriller".

Gautham S. of Pinkvilla rated 3.5/5 and highlighted Mammootty's portrayal but found the narrative predictable. Rohit Panikker of Filmfare rated 3.5/5 and described it as a slow-burning crime mystery with emphasis on mood and silence. Vishal Menon of The Hollywood Reporter India stated that Mammootty appeared "like never before" in a genre-driven thriller, praising the film's atmosphere and its screenwriting.
