= Saina Play =

Indian video streaming service

- Screenshot
- Website type: OTT platform
- Headquarters: Kochi, Kerala, {{{location_country}}}
- Country of origin: India
- Area served: Worldwide
- Owner: Saina Infotainments Pvt. Ltd.
- CEO: Aashiq Bava
- Managing director: PM Bava
- Industry: Mass Media, Entertainment
- Website: sainaplay.com
- Registration: Required
- Launched: January 2019
- Current status: Active

Saina Play is a regional over-the-top (OTT) subscription-based streaming service in India, primarily focused on Malayalam-language content. It is owned by Saina Infotainments Pvt. Ltd. and is headquartered in Kochi, Kerala, India

Saina Play has four different plans, and most of the content is available at up to 1080p resolution. In addition to subscription-based access, the platform also provides a Pay-Per-View (PPV) option, allowing users to watch films without a subscription by paying for individual titles. Saina Play is currently available on Web, Google Play Store, App Store, Android TV, LG Smart TV (WebOS), Samsung TV (Tizen), Apple TV and Fire TV, It was first launched on Android, and iOS in January 2019.

== History ==
The company started with CDs and cassettes. In 1985, PM Bava from Kalady, Kochi, established Saina Audio & Video in Chennai, a video distribution business for South Indian films. In 2018, his son Aashiq Bava introduced Saina Play, moving from physical media to a digital platform.
