= Chandradasan =

Indian theatre director, actor, writer, and translator

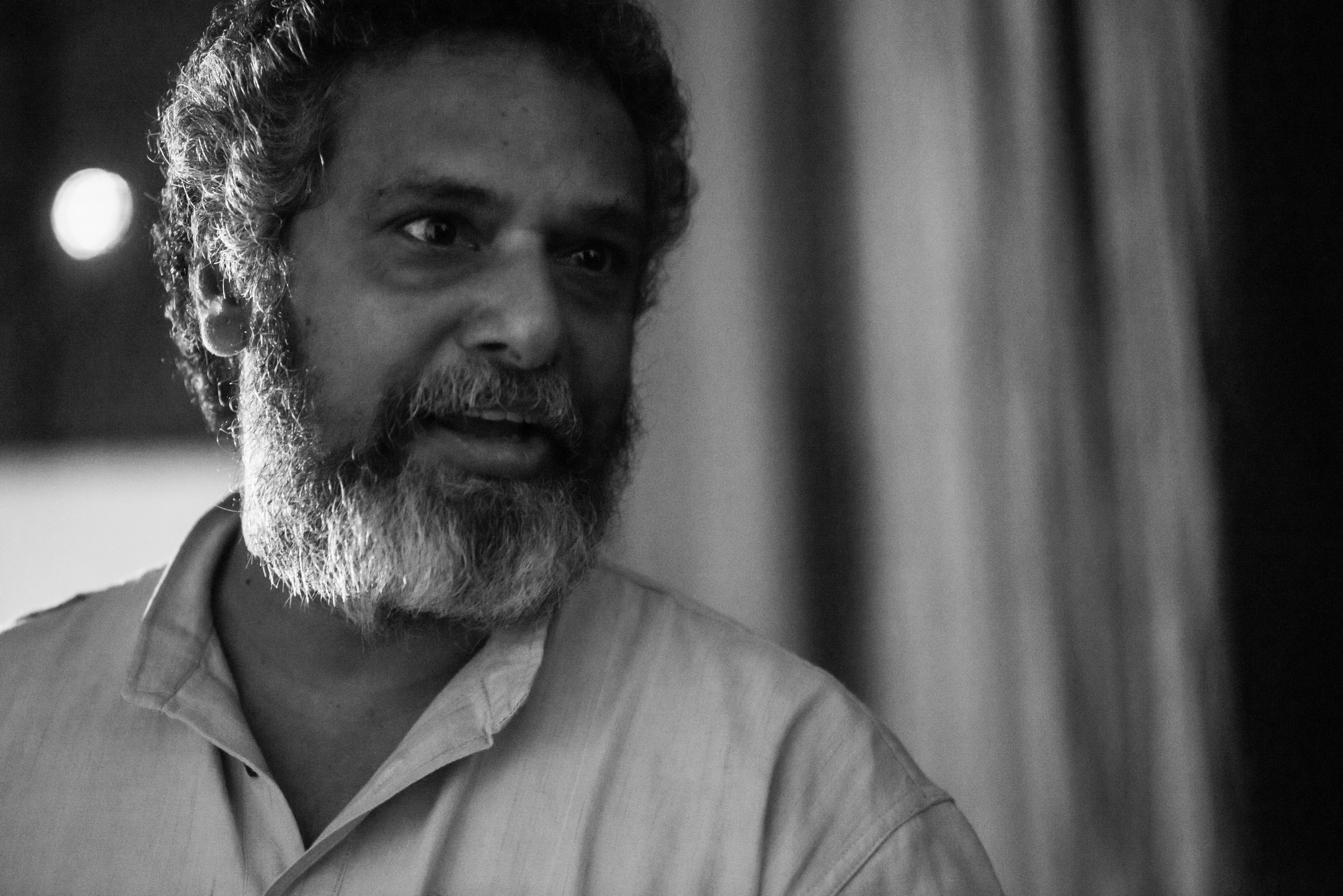
- Born: Chandradasan; 25 December 1958 (age 67); Kottayam, Kerala
- Education: CMS College Kottayam
- Occupations: Theatre director, Academic, director

Chandradasan (born December 1958) is an Indian theatre director, actor, writer, and translator from Kerala, India.

== Early life and education ==
Chandradasan worked with rural theatre groups like Gramavedi Vallarpadam, Bhasabheri Thripunithura and directed plays including Theruvujadha, Rajavinte Chenda which were performed widely all over Kerala launched him as a noteworthy theatre person in the state.

== Lokadharmi Theatre Group ==
Chandradasan is the founder of Lokadharmi Theatre Group and Mazhavillu, a children's theatre group, both based in Kochi, Kerala, India.

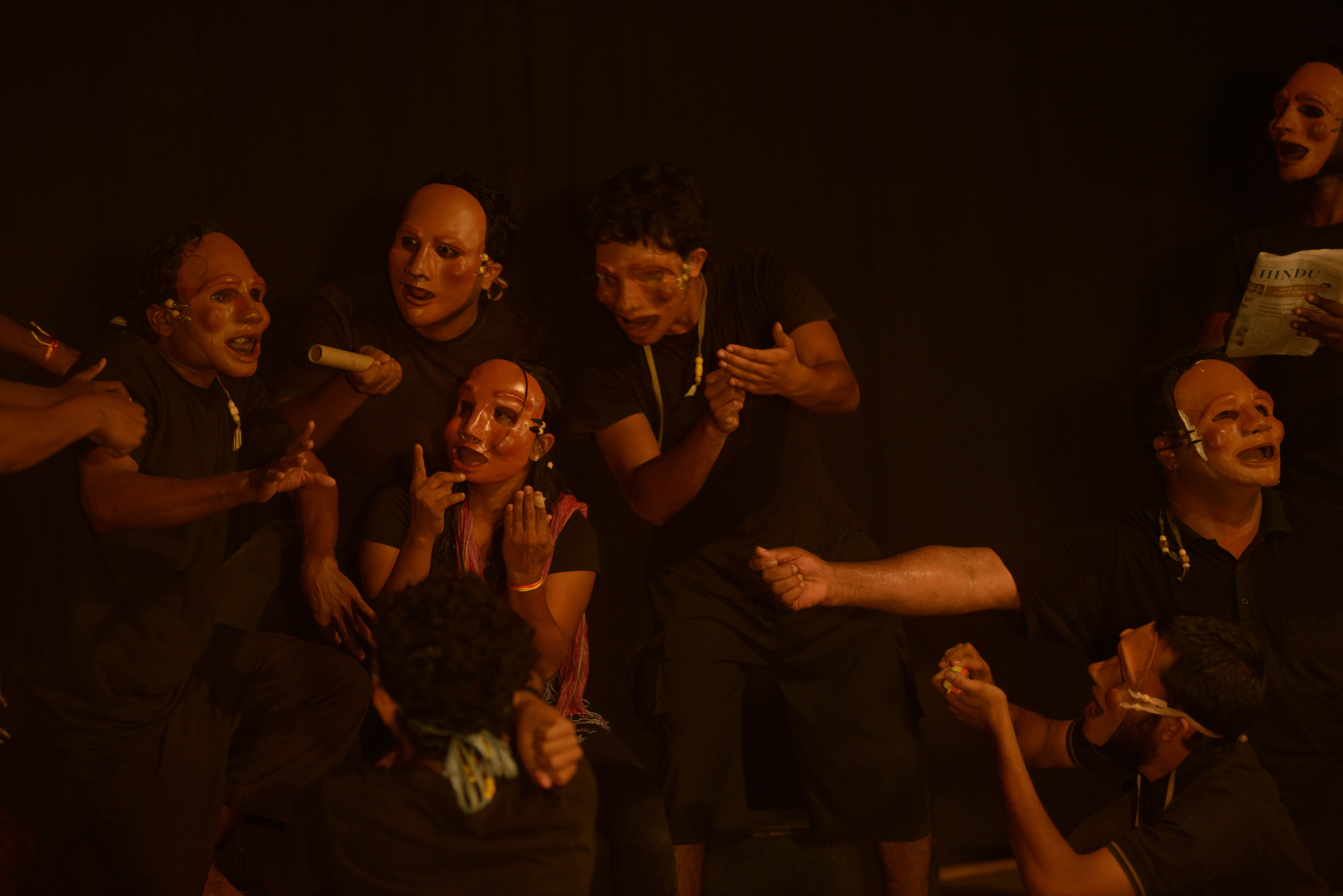
Viswavikhyathamaya Mookku (World Famous Noose) (Co-director Terry Converse USA)

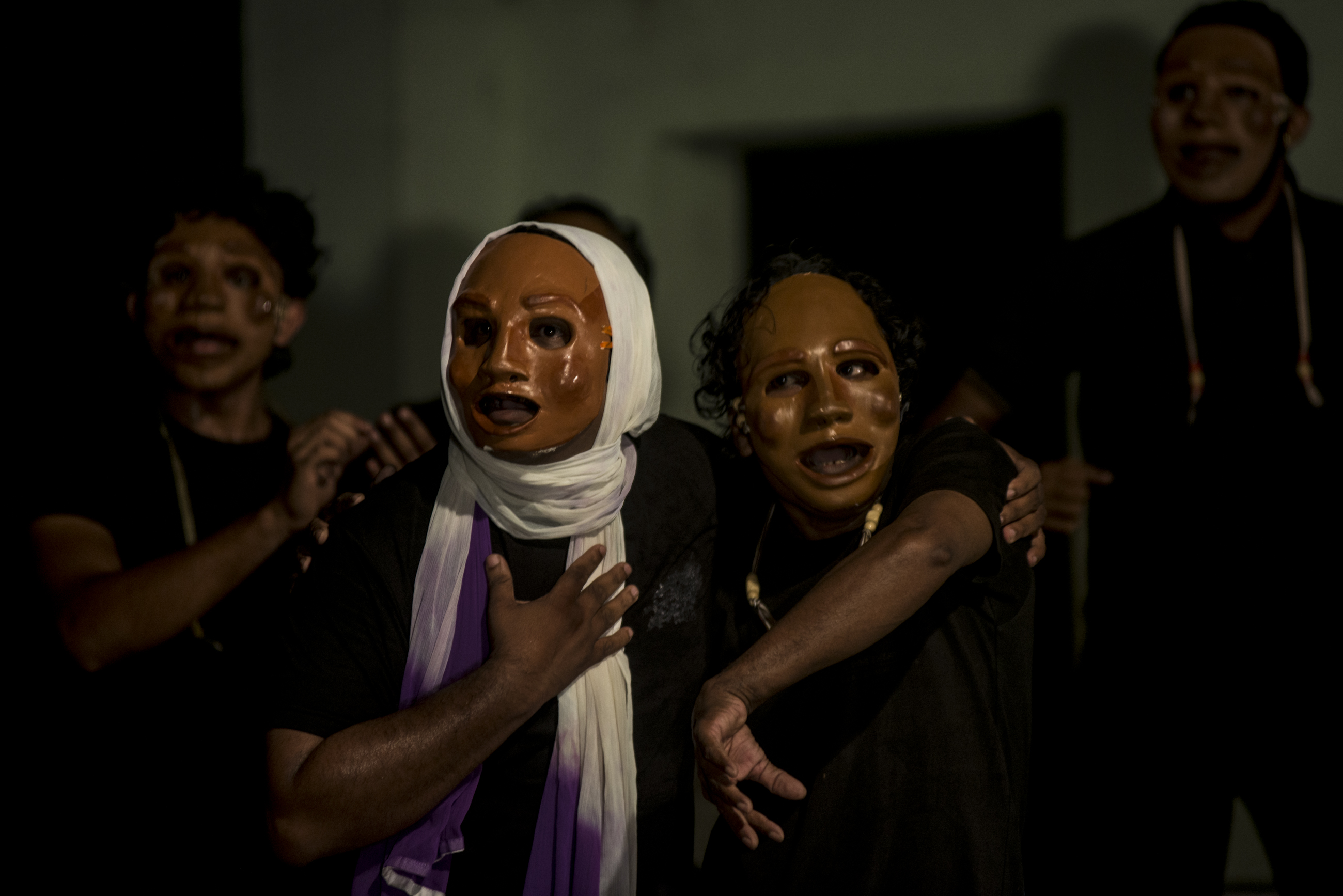
Viswavikhyathamaya Mookku (World Famous Noose) (Co-director Terry Converse USA)

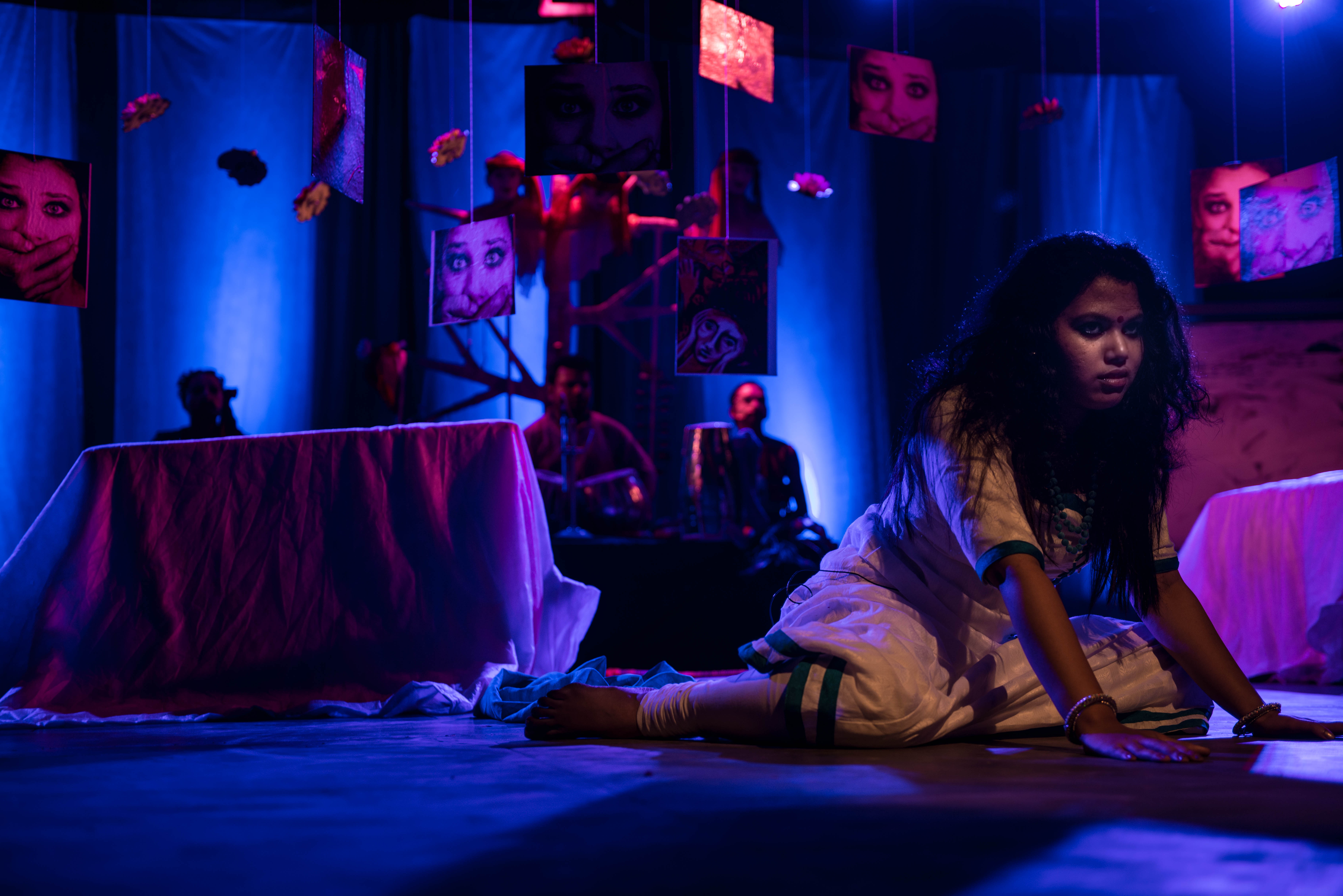
Draupadi Lokadharmi

== Non-theatrical contributions ==
He was the director board member of RRC, Bangalore of NSD. and was a professor in chemistry at St. Albert's College, Ernakulam. He has also done notable roles in few films.

== Directorial works ==
Year	Title	Production
2020	Kariya Devara Huduki (In Search of Black God)	NSD Bangalore
2019	Arkediyadalli Puck (Puck in Arkediya)	Rangayana Mysore
2018	Shakuntalam – Oru Nayattu Kadha (Shakuntalam- the story of the Hunt)	Lokadharmi
2017	Shakuntalam	National School of Drama, Delhi
2016	Journey in Three Chapters	Lokadharmi
2016	Kaali Naadakam (The play of Kaali)	Lokadharmi
2014	Agleyum Cliyopatrayum (Egle and Cleopatra)	Lokadharmi
2014	Story of the Silly Folk	Arts Council, Joensuu, Finland
2014	Thathamaram (The Parrot-Tree)	Mazhavillu, Children's Theatre group
2013	Eagle and Cleopatra	Anima Mundi, International Arts Festival Lithuania
2012	Viswavikhyathamaya Mookku (World Famous Noose) (Co-director Terry Converse USA)	Lokadharmi
2012	Draupadi	Lokadharmi
2012	Two Mothers in the Realm of Death (Co-director Tuire Hindikka, Finland)	Arts Council Joensuu, Finland and Lokadharmi
2011	Lankalakshmi	Lokadharmi
2010	Bommanahalliyile Kinnara Yogi (The Yogi from Bommanahalli with the Kinnara)	Mazhavillu, Children's Theatre Group Kochi
2009	Bommanahalliyile Bommanahalliya Kindari Jogi (The Yogi from Bommanahalli with the Kinnara)	MP Prakash Arts Foundation, Shimoga
2009	Abhayarthikal (Refugees)	Lokadharmi
2007	Alibabayum 40 Kallanmarum	Mazhavillu, Children's Theatre Group Kochi
2007	Madhavi	Campus Theatre of St. Alberts College and Lokadharmi
2006	Ubu Maharaja (Ubu Roi)	Lokadharmi
2006	Pattabakki	Lokadharmi
2005	Alibabayum 40 Kallanmarum	Bangalore RRC of National School of Drama, and Kamak School Tutucorin, Tamil Nadu
2005	Rithubhethangal	Hindustan News Print Limited, Velloor, Kerala performed at HPC day at Kolkata
2004	Ravunni	Suryakanthi Theatre Alappuzha
2002	Charandas Chor (Charandas the Thief)	Mazhavillu Children's Theatre
2002	The Selfish Giant	Surya Children's Theatre Kochi
2001	Madhuve Hennu (The Bride)	Holeranga, Honnali, Karnataka
2000	Medea	Lokadharmi (earlier produced by St. Alberts College in 1996 Ernakulam and Sopanam Kollam)
1999	Kalippavakal	Surya Children's Theatre Kochi
1998	Nandan Kadha	Lokadharmi
1996	Poranadi (The Outcaste)	Lokadharmi
1995	Vishnu Maya (The Illusion of Vishnu)	Surya Children's Theatre Kochi
1995	Chathankattu (The Tempest)	Lokadharmi
1994	Oru Koottam Urumpukal	Surya Children's Theatre Kochi
1993	Karnnabharam (The Anguish of Karnna)	Lokadharmi
1989	Gopuranadayil (at the Sanctum Sanctorum)	Bhasabheri Thripunithura
1989	Rajavinte Chenda (Safdar Hashmi -adapted by Chandradasan)	Gramavedi Vallarpadam, Kochi
1988	Death Watch	Gramavedi Vallarpadam, Kochi
1987	Theruvujadha (The Procession) Badal Sircar	Gramavedi Vallarpadam, Kochi

== Acting credits ==
Year	Film	Role	Director
2020	Trance (2020 film)	Rev Fr. Joseph Kurian	Anwar Rasheed
2020	Murivukal Puzhayakunnu	Dr.James	PK Sunil Nath
2019	Vari- the Sentence	Human Rights officer	Srijith Poyilkavu
2019	Ottam	Business man	Zam
2019	Oru Caribbean Udayipu	Director of a college	A Joji
2019	One way	Rich Gambler	Muthuswami Sakthivel
2019	Guzman Gomaz	Guzman	Jayan Naduvathazhath
2017	Ezra (2017 film)	Priest	Jay K
2016	School Bus (film)	Forest Researcher	Rosshan Andrrews
2014	Gangster (2014 film)	Doctor	Aashiq Abu
2013	Kalimannu	Political Leader	Blessy
