= Shajahanum Pareekuttiyum =

- Theatrical release poster
- Directed by: Boban Samuel
- Written by: YV Rajesh
- Produced by: Ashiq Usman
- Starring: Kunchacko Boban; Jayasurya; Amala Paul; Aju Varghese; Lena Kumar; Suraj Venjaramoodu; Vijayaraghavan
- Cinematography: Anishlal R. S.
- Edited by: Lijo Paul
- Music by: Gopi Sunder
- Production company: Ashiq Usman Productions
- Distributed by: Central Pictures
- Release date: July 6, 2016 (India)
- Running time: 132 minutes
- Country: India
- Language: Malayalam

Shajahanum Pareekuttiyum (transl. Shajahan and Pareekutty) is a 2016 Indian Malayalam-language romantic comedy film directed by Boban Samuel. The film stars Kunchacko Boban, Jayasurya, and Amala Paul in the lead roles. Nikki Galrani made a cameo appearance. Principal photography began on 4 April 2016, and the film was released on 6 July 2016 on the occasion of Eid.

== Synopsis ==
Jiya suffers from short-term memory loss after an accident. Although her marriage is fixed with Major Ravi, she has flashes of memory that she had been in a relationship with a certain Mr. P. However, she doesn't know who this mysterious guy is. So, the task of finding Mr. P is entrusted to Mathews. But making his job easier and difficult at the same time, two people come into the scene. Pranav, a high-profile businessman, and Prince, a local goon, claim to be Jiya's boyfriend and what happens next forms the crux of the story. In the end, it's revealed that Pranav has been tailing Jiya to get back Pranav's car, a red modified Toyota Celica T200 Car. When Jiya takes the car, it meets with an accident, and she is saved by none other than Prince. Now, Pranav's car is with Prince. When a fight for the car occurs and Prince accidentally beats the car's rear fender with a crowbar, the car's inner body (inside car's paint layer) is painted with Illegal Gold, because the car actually belongs to Pranav's boss Joseph, a gold smuggler, and the vehicle is Joseph's son's memory. Pranav and Prince escape with the car and Joseph is caught by the police. Both get remuneration from Customs for catching Joseph.

== Cast ==
- Kunchacko Boban as Pranav, A Businessman
- Jayasurya as Prince, A Mechanical Workshop
- Amala Paul as Jiya, Lovers of Pranav & Prince
- Rafi as Joseph, the main antagonist
- Aju Varghese as Emmanuel Major Ravi alias Major Raji, A Indian Army & Jiya's fiancé
- Lena Kumar as Dr. Deepa Kurian, A Psychiatrist
- Suraj Venjaramoodu as Detective Mathews, Ravi's Friend
- Vijayaraghavan as Colonel Stephen, Jiya's father
- Vinaya Prasad as Nancy, Jiya's mother
- Nadirshah as Psychiatrist Dr. Titus Alex (cameo appearance)
- Nikki Galrani as Customs Officer Thresiamma Punnose (cameo appearance)
- Irshad Ali as Idukki ACP Sameer Hammed IPS
- Lishoy as Idukki SP Devanarayanan M. IPS
- Kalabhavan Shajon as Kumily SIAshokan
- Kunchan as Kunjappan
- Kochu Preman as Purushothaman
- Baiju Ezhupunna as Tony
- Sunil Sukhada as Father Andrews
- Shaju K.S. as Jackson
- Nandu Poduval as Ravindran, Mental Patient
- Asottan Bombay

== Production ==
Y. V. Rajesh, whose previous venture as a writer with Boban Samuel was the 2013 hit comedy film Romans, wrote the script for the film in early 2016 and tied up with his friend and frequent collaborator, Boban Samuel. The film started rolling in early April with Kunchacko Boban and Jayasurya as the lead actors and Amala Paul as the female lead.

It is the seventh film in which K. Boban and Jayasurya have acted together, with their most recent one being the 2016 thriller drama School Bus. Samuel has previously directed K. Boban in the film Romans. On May 25, it was reported that Nikki Galrani would essay a role of a customs officer in the film. In June 2016, it was revealed that Aju Varghese would play the role of a military man. The character would be inspired by Malayalam director Major Ravi.

== Release ==
Shajahanum Pareekuttiyum released during the festival of Eid on 6 July 2016. In the box office, it pitted against Karinkunnam 6'S.
