= 28 (2019 film) =

Indian thriller film

- 28 movie poster
- Directed by: Jayan Naduvathazhath
- Written by: Jayan Naduvathazhath
- Story by: Jayan Naduvathazhath; Dr.Rajath R
- Produced by: Praveen Sukumaran; MMN
- Cinematography: Sangeeth Mathews
- Edited by: Rizaal Jainey
- Distributed by: MX Player, Spuul
- Release date: November 8, 2019
- Running time: 75 minutes
- Country: India

28 is a 2019 Indian Malayalam language experimental thriller feature film directed by Jayan Naduvathazhath, streaming on MX Player and Spuul. The film gained attention for being entirely shot in 5 days with a budget of less than Rs. 3 lakhs. The film received two awards in the WinterSunTV Viewers Choice Awards for Best actor in a Lead Role and for the Best Actor in Negative Role. The film also Won 'Honourable Mention ' award at 7th Art International Independent Film Festival.

== Plot ==
The movie 28 revolves around an overnight meeting between five friends. One of them has come to payback a long-standing debt. The friend settles his debts and leaves for abroad. Later a policeman friend comes in and finds out that the currency was fake. This triggers a rift between all of them. Each one takes stands and argues their point differently. Twists and turns follow (like the game of 28) and towards the end of the movie the mysterious sides of the characters unfold.

== Cast ==
- Vinodh Mohanan
- Jackson AJ
- Anjith Merrie Jan
- Sarat Prakash
- Praveen Sukumaran
- Amitha Anil

== Awards and nominations ==
Won 'Honourable Mention ' award at 7th Art International Independent Film Festival.
