= Vyuham =

Vyuham or Vyooham may refer to:

- Vyūha, Sanskrit term for battle formation
  - Vyuham (military), science of military formations in ancient India
- Vyooham (1990 film), a Malayalam-language crime drama
- Vyooham (TV series), a Telugu-language action thriller
- Vyuham (2024 film), a Telugu-language political thriller

== See also ==
- Chakravyuha (disambiguation)
- Padmavyooham (disambiguation)
- Sukhāvatīvyūha (disambiguation)
