= Manasa Radhakrishnan =

Indian actress

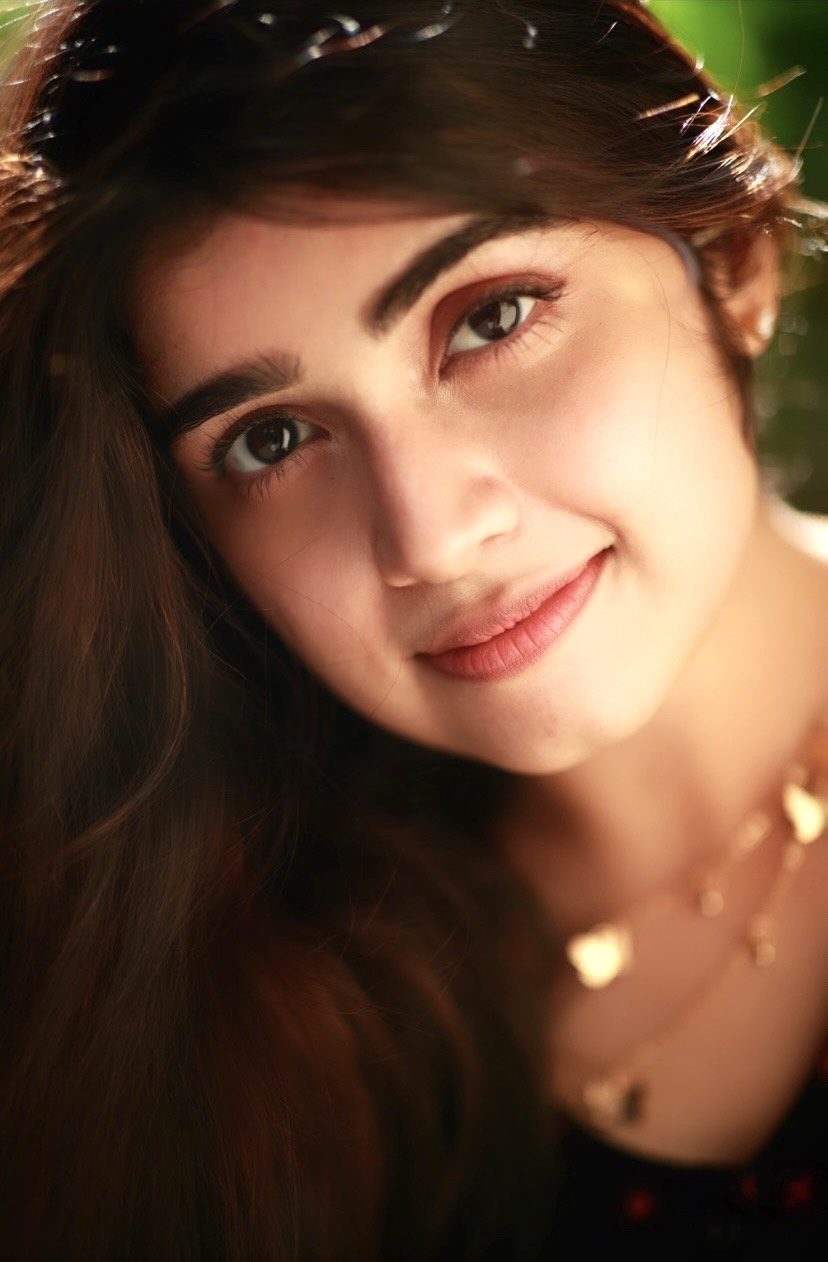
- Born: Manasa Radhakrishnan; September 29, 1998 (age 28); Ernakulam, Kerala, India
- Education: The Indian High School, Dubai; The Choice School
- Years active: 2008–2014; 2017–present

Manasa Radhakrishnan (born 29 September 1998) is an Indian actress who appears predominantly in Malayalam films.

== Personal life ==
Manasa was born in Ernakulam, Kerala to Radhakrishnan V. K. and Sreekala and was raised in Dubai. She studied until class 10 at The Indian High School, Dubai, her higher secondary education was at The Choice School in Thrippunithura. She learnt Indian classical dance, cinematic dance, and guitar. Manasa is pursuing Computer Science and Engineering at Muthoot Institute of Technology and Science (MITS).

== Career ==
Manasa is an Indian actress known for her work in Malayalam, Telugu, and Tamil cinema. She began her acting career as a child artist, making her debut in Kannuneerinum Madhuram (2008). She continued to appear in child roles in films such as Kadaksham (2010), Villali Veeran (2014), and Paulettante Veedu (2016).

Manasa made her debut as a lead heroine in the Malayalam film Kaattu (2017). She gained recognition with performances in Tiyaan (2017), Kaattu (2017), and Crossroads (2017). In subsequent years, she appeared in Vikadakumaran (2018), Sakalakalashala (2019), and Children's Park (2019), establishing herself in the industry.

Manasa made her Telugu film debut with Highway (2022) and entered Tamil cinema with Paramaguru (2022). She portrayed YS Bharathi in the Ram Gopal Varma-directed Telugu films Vyuham (2024) and Shapatham (2024).

Through her career, Manasahas demonstrated versatility, transitioning from child roles to lead characters across multiple South Indian film industries.

== Filmography ==
| Year | Title | Role | Director | Notes |
|---|---|---|---|---|
| 2008 | Kannuneerinum Madhuram | Parvathy | Raghunath Paleri | Child actor |
| 2010 | Kadaksham | Malu | Sasi Paravoor | Child actor |
| 2014 | Villali Veeran | Sandra | Sudheesh Shankar | Child actor |
| 2016 | Paulettante Veedu | Sara Paul | Dilip Narayanan | |
| 2017 | Tiyaan | Jaseela | Jiyen Krishnakumar | |
| 2017 | Kaattu | Ummukkulsu | Arun Kumar Aravind | |
| 2017 | Crossroads | Sara | Babu Thiruvalla | Segment: Mounam |
| 2018 | Vikadakumaran | Sindhu | Boban Samuel | |
| 2019 | Sakalakalashala | Mumtaz | Vinod Guruvayur | |
| 2019 | Children's Park | Prarthana | Shafi | |
| 2020 | Uriyadi | Renuka | AJ Varghese | |
| 2022 | Twenty One Gms | Anjali | Bibin Krishna | |
| 2022 | Paappan | Young Bennitta Issac | Joshiy | |
| 2022 | Highway | Tulasi | K. V. Guhan | Telugu film |
| 2023 | Sengalam | Mathiyarasi | S. R. Prabhakaran | Tamil web series |
| 2024 | Ormachithram | Parvathy | Oru Vazhipokkan | |
| 2024 | Vyuham | YS Bharathi | Ram Gopal Varma | Telugu film |
| 2024 | Shapatham | YS Bharathi | Ram Gopal Varma | Telugu film |
| TB | Ram Bhajrang | TBA | Sudheer Raju | Telugu film |
| TB | Untitled Telugu Movie | TBA | | Telugu film |
| TB | Paramaguru | TBA | Jiyen Krishnakumar | Tamil film |
| TB | Untitled Malayalam movie | TBA | Sadat Sainudeen | |
| TB | Untitled Telugu Movie 2 | TBA | | |

=== Other works ===
| Year | Title | Role | Notes |
|---|---|---|---|
| 2014 | The Other Side | Anu | Short Film |
| 2016 | Keerthi | Keerthi | Short Film |
| 2016 | Pallathi | | Music Album |
| 2019 | Grey | | Short film |
| 2020 | Iravipuram Diaries | Anagha | Short film |
| 2022 | Naimithikam | Nimmi | Short film |
| 2022 | Theeram | | Music Album |
| 2026 | Secret Stories: Roslin | Angel (Cameo) | Hotstar Web Series |
