= Christopher and Philucifer =

- Genre: Comedy Fantasy
- Written by: Jayan Naduvathazhath
- Directed by: Jayan Naduvathazhath
- Country of origin: India
- Original language: Malayalam
- No. of seasons: 1

Christopher and Philucifer is a 2018 Indian Malayalam-language Web series Written and Directed by Jayan Naduvathazhath streaming on Kerala Vision.

== Synopsis ==
"Christopher and Phliucifer" is a Malayalam Sitcom series. Each episode consists of short conversations between Christopher (Chris) and his Alter Ego Philucifer (Luci or Philosepher Lucifer).Everyday Luci comes up with a new close to life topic and funny conversations progress between the two. Chris argues his logic, which Luci casually counters and Chris becomes speechless towards the end of each of the episodes.

"Christopher and Phliucifer" was listed in the top 12 highly recommended Malayalam Web series by Film Companion.

== Sources ==
- https://keralavisiontv.com/news/category/christopher-lucifer
- http://keralavisiontv.com/news/45295
