= Janapriyan =

- Theatrical poster
- Directed by: Boban Samuel
- Written by: Krishna Poojapura
- Produced by: Mammen John; Reena M John
- Starring: Jayasurya; Manoj K. Jayan; Bhama; Sarayu; Lalu Alex
- Cinematography: Pradeep Nair
- Edited by: V. T. Sreejith
- Music by: Rinil Gowtham
- Production company: Spot Light Visions
- Distributed by: Kalasangham Films
- Release date: 20 May 2011
- Running time: 120 minutes
- Country: India
- Language: Malayalam

Janapriyan (transl. "Popular Among People") is a 2011 Indian Malayalam-language drama film directed by Boban Samuel (in his directorial debut) and starring Jayasurya and Bhama. The film was released on 20 May 2011.

== Plot ==
The film revolves around two central characters: Vaishakan, an aspiring film director, and Priyadarshan, a simple village man. Vaishakan is struggling to make his mark in the film industry, presenting his script to a producer named Achayan, who bluntly tells him that the story is not worthy of being produced. Vaishakan, who has a government job, is suspended for neglecting his duties. Although his father insisted on the government job, Vaishakan sees this suspension as an opportunity to focus on his passion for filmmaking. However, his script fails to gain traction, and people ridicule him both for his failures as a director and for being inattentive to his job. Eventually, he is forced to take a five-year leave without pay.

The narrative then shifts to Priyadarshan, a cheerful and hardworking man from a village who tends to his family's rubber farm and sells produce. His life is burdened by financial difficulties stemming from his father's suicide due to debts, and his family is struggling to marry off his sister. Determined to pay off the family's debts, Priyadarshan's life takes a positive turn when he receives an appointment letter to temporarily fill Vaishakan's vacant position at the Taluk Office. Overjoyed, Priyadarshan approaches his new job with sincerity and idealism, amusing his city colleagues with his earnestness and rural ways. He also meets Kannappan, a humorous roommate, and falls in love with Meera, believing she is a maid, though in reality, she is the daughter of a wealthy household.

Vaishakan eventually returns to the office, announcing that he has given up on his filmmaking dreams and wants his job back, leaving Priyadarshan disappointed. Nevertheless, Priyadarshan offers to help Vaishakan by reworking his script, turning it into a heartfelt story about a poor father and son. This impresses Achayan, who agrees to produce the film. Meanwhile, Priyadarshan's feelings for Meera deepen, but his world is shattered when he discovers that Meera is not a maid, but the daughter of a wealthy man. Heartbroken, he confronts her, feeling deceived, and apologizes to her father. He declares, with tears, that his only dream in life was to marry Meera, and that dream is now destroyed.

The film also features a subplot where Vaishakan, mistaken about another woman's identity, attempts to court Revathy, believing she is the daughter of the house, only to realize his error. Meanwhile, Achayan offers Priyadarshan the opportunity to direct the film, recognizing that Priyadarshan was the true creative force behind the revised script. Achayan tells Priyadarshan that Malayalam cinema needs directors like him, but Priyadarshan declines the offer, unwilling to take away the project from Vaishakan. This act reveals Priyadarshan's pure heart, and Vaishakan comes to respect him for his integrity.

Priyadarshan returns to his village, where he faces gossip from the locals, accusing him of cheating the girl in the city. However, he soon realizes that he loved Meera for who she was, not because he thought she was poor. In a touching final scene, Meera and her family, along with Vaishakan, the Head, and Achayan, visit Priyadarshan's village. The Head explains that while Priyadarshan loved Meera thinking she was poor, Meera loved him knowing that he was poor, indicating that her love was even deeper. The film ends with Priyadarshan and Meera seemingly married, returning to the city together, while Vaishakan and his production crew wave at them as they pass by.

== Cast ==
- Jayasurya as Priyadarshan (Priyan)/Janapriyan.
- Manoj K. Jayan as Vaishakan
- Bhama as Meera
- Sarayu as Revathy
- Lalu Alex as Rajendran Nambiar, Priyadarshan's Boss
- Salim Kumar as Kannappan
- Devan as Shivasankar, Meera's father
- Bheeman Raghu as Karimpuli Pappan
- Jagathy Sreekumar as Achayan
- Sreelatha Namboothiri
- Chembil Ashokan as Vaishakan's father
- Reshmi Boban as Vaishakan's sister
- Koottickal Jayachandran as local politician
- Kalabhavan Shajohn as peon
- Nisha Sarangh as Karimpuli Pappan's Wife
- Althara

== Production ==
The film was directed by Boban Samuel and produced by Mammen John and Reena M. John. The story, screenplay, and dialogues were written by Krishna Poojapura. Music for the film was composed by R. Gautham, while the cinematography was handled by Pradeep Nair and editing by V. T. Sreejith. Art direction was handled by Manu Jagadh, designs were by Jissen Paul, and still photography was done by Mahadevan Thampy. The film was distributed by Kalasangham Release.

Principal photography began on 26 January 2011, with shooting locations in Kochi and Thodupuzha.

== Release ==
The film was released on 20 May 2011.

=== Box office ===
Janapriyan was a commercial success.

== Soundtrack ==
Janapriyan

Soundtrack album by R. Gautham
- Released: 12 May 2011 (India)
- Recorded: 2011
- Genre: Feature film soundtrack
- Length: 13:38
- Producers: Mammen John, Reena M John

The soundtrack was released on 12 May 2011, with music composed by R. Gautham. Lyrics were written by Santhosh Varma and Manju Vellayani. There was no special event for the audio release, and the music was distributed directly to audio sellers.

Song	Singer(s)	Duration	Lyrics
"Erivenal "	Sudeep Kumar, Jyothsna	4.35	Santhosh Varma, Manju Vellayani
"Nanmakalerum "	K. J. Yesudas	4.33	Santhosh Varma, Manju Vellayani
"Pookkaithe "	Madhu Balakrishnan	4.29	Santhosh Varma, Manju Vellayani
