= Reshmi Boban =

Indian actress

- Born: Taliparamba, Kannur district, Kerala, India
- Occupation: Actress
- Spouse: Boban Samuel
- Children: 2

Reshmi Boban is an Indian actress known for her performance in Malayalam films and television series. She made her acting debut with the television show Jwalayayi in 1999 and later made her film debut in 2003 through Manassinakkare.

== Television career ==
=== TV serials ===
List of Reshmi Boban television credits
Year	Title	Role	Channel	Notes
1999–2000	Jwalayayi	Dr. Parvathy	Doordarshan	
1999	Asooyapookkal	Mili	—	
2000	Devatha		Asianet	
2000	Harichandanam		Surya TV	
2000–2001	Hukka Huvva Mikkado		Kairali TV	
2001	Peythoriyathe		Surya TV	
2002	Sooryakanthi		Doordarshan	
	Thulasidalam		Surya TV	
	Angadipaattu	Seetha	Doordarshan	
	Maaya	Seema	Kairali TV	
	Pakida Pakida Pambaram			
2003	Chila Kudumba Chithrangal		Kairali TV	
2004	Swapnam		Asianet	
2005	Pavakoothu		Amrita TV	
2006	Veendum Jwalayayi		Doordarshan	
2007	Chitrashalabham		Amrita TV	
2007	Velankani Mathavu		Surya TV	
2007–2008	Sree Guruvayoorappan	Dhatri	Surya TV	
2007–2008	Sree Krishnaleela		Surya TV	
2007	Nombarappoovu	Jaya	Asianet	
2008	Hello Kuttichathan		Asianet	
2008–2009	Bhamini Tholkkarilla	Mary	Asianet	
2009–2010	Autograph	Susanna	Asianet	
2010	Gajarajan Guruvayoor Keshavan	Bhagi	Surya TV	
2011–2012	Manassu Parayunna Karyangal	Dhanalakshmi	Mazhavil Manorama	
2011–2012	Sreekrishnan		Surya TV	
2016	Puthooram Puthran Unnikuttan		Asianet	Telefilm
2018–2019	Adutha Bellodu Koodi	Suhasini	Zee Keralam	
2019–2020	Priyapettaval	Maheshwari	Mazhavil Manorama	
2019	Puttum Kattanum	Rashmi	Kairali TV	
2020	Chocolate	Roshan's mother	Surya TV	
2021	Arranged Marriage	Chitra	YouTube	
2021	Pookkalam Varavayi	Parvathy	Zee Keralam	
2021–2022	Daya	Kamala	Asianet	
2023– 2024	Shyamambaram	Medayil kovilakathu Vasundhara Devi	Zee Keralam	
2023	Mangalyam	Vasundhara	Zee Keralam	extended cameo
2024-2025	Gayathridevi Ente Amma	Vasudha	Mazhavil Manorama	
2024-2025	Apoorvaragam	Janaki	Zee Keralam	
2025-present	Amme Mookambike	Indumathi	Surya TV	
2026-present	Pranayavilasam	Sumithra	Zee Keralam	

=== TV shows ===
- 2013: Sreekandan Nair Show as Panelist
- 2014: Ruchibhedham (ACV) as Presenter
- 2014: Surya Challenge (Surya TV) as Participant
- Malayali Darbar (Amrita TV) as Panelist
- 2019: Paisa Paisa (Kerala Vision) as Participant
- 2020: Singing Chef (Surya TV) as Host
- 2021: Bzinga (Zee Keralam) as Participant
- 2022: Red Carpet (Amrita TV) as Mentor
- 2022: Flowers Oru Kodi [Flowers] as Participant
- 2022: Start Music Aaradhyam Paadum Season 4 (Asianet) as Participant
- 2022: Parayam Nedam (Amrita TV) as Participant

== Filmography ==
Key
†	Denotes films that have not yet been released

List of Reshmi Boban film credits
Year	Title	Role	Notes
2003	Manassinakkare	Molikutty	
2005	Achuvinte Amma	Usha	
2006	Rasathanthram	Bindhu	
2006	Karutha Pakshikal	Anitha	
2006	Baba Kalyani	Babu's wife	
2007	July 4	Sujatha	
2007	Nasrani	Alice	
2007	Vinodayathra	Ambili	
2008	Kanichukulangarayil CBI	Thanky Ratheesh	
2008	Innathe Chintha Vishayam	Soumini	
2008	Sultan	Dr.Ranjini	
2009	Bhagyadevatha	Sainabha	
2009	Kaana Kanmani	Thresiamma	
2009	Duplicate	Nalini	
2009	Red Chillies	Stalin's wife	
2009	I. G. – Inspector General	Paul's wife	
2010	Plus Two	Parvathy	
2010	Pranchiyettan & the Saint	Pauly's mother	
2010	Shikkar	Ramani	
2010	Kaaryasthan	Krishnanunni's kin	
2010	Katha Thudarunnu	Razia	
2011	Janapriyan	Vaishakan's sister	
2011	August 15	Sadasivan's daughter	
2011	Oru Marubhoomikkadha	Jose's wife	
2011	Chandrayan	—	English film
2012	The King & the Commissioner	Doctor	
2012	Asuravithu	Saly	
2012	Thiruvambadi Thamban	Thamban's kin	
2012	Kunjaliyan	Pushpalatha	
2012	Ek SRK	—	Hindi film
2013	Sound Thoma	Amina Musthafa	
2016	Jalam	Aruna Das	
2016	Thoppil Joppan	Susamma	
2017	Munthirivallikal Thalirkkumbol	Alice	
2017	Oru Cinemakkaran	Chinnamma	
2017	Sakhavu	Headmistress	
2018	Mazhayathu	Lilly Miss	
2019	Oru Yamandan Premakadha	Dr. Susan	
2019	Sachin	Radhamani	
2020	Al Mallu	Gopika	
2021	One	Indhira	
2022	Karnan Napoleon Bhagath Singh		
2022	Heaven	School Principal	
2023	Dear Vaappi	Company Owner	
2023	Neymar	Mary Thomas	
2024	ARM	Lakshmi's mother	
2025	Bromance	Binto's and Shinto's mother	
2025	Sarvam Maya	Deepthi	
2026	Thudakkam	Siya and Miya's mother	
