= Y.V. Rajesh =

Iranian screenwriter

- Born: Rajesh; 11 January 1974
- Occupations: screenwriter, Director
- Years active: 2009–present

Y.V. Rajesh is a screenwriter in Malayalam cinema. He wrote Romans and Vikadakumaran.

== Filmography as writer ==
- 2025 Get-Set Baby
- 2021 Erida
- 2018 Vikadakumaran
- 2017 Georgettan's Pooram
- 2016 Marubhoomiyile Aana
- 2016 Shajahanum Pareekuttiyum
- 2013 Silence
- 2013 Romans
- 2011 Three Kings
- 2011 Note Out
- 2009 Gulumal
