= Al Mallu =

Indian Malayalam-language comedy drama film

- Film poster
- Directed by: Boban Samuel
- Screenplay by: Boban Samuel
- Story by: Jayan Naduvathazhath; Dr. Rajath R.
- Produced by: Sajils Majeed
- Starring: Namitha Pramod; Miya George; Lal; Siddique; Fariz Majeed; Anoop Majeed; Dharmajan Bolgatty; Mithun Ramesh; Sheelu Abraham; Varada
- Cinematography: Vivek Menon
- Edited by: Deepu Joseph
- Music by: Ranjin Raj
- Production company: Mehfil Productions
- Release date: 17 January 2020
- Running time: 122 minutes
- Country: India
- Language: Malayalam

Al Mallu is a 2020 Indian Malayalam-language comedy drama film directed by Boban Samuel, produced by Sajil Majeed under the banner of Mehfil Productions. It stars Namitha Pramod and Miya George in lead roles.

== Cast ==
- Namitha Pramod as Nayana
- Miya George as Gimmy
- Fariz Majeed as Sreedhar Sreenivas
- Dharmajan Bolgatty as Perera
- Sheelu Abraham as Diya Chechi Nayana's Elder sister
- Lal as Father Paul
- Anoop Majeed as Tom
- Siddique as Abraham Tharakan, a con man hired by Tom to pretend as his father
- Mithun Ramesh as Prem
- Prem Prakash as Sreenivas Sreedhar's father
- Varada as Gayathri
- Malavika Menon
- Sohan Roy as Nayana's Boss
- Reshmi Boban as Gopika, Sreedhar's mother
- Sruthi Lakshmi as a Singer
- Madhuri Braganza in Intro Song

== Release ==
The film released on 17 January 2020.

== Soundtrack ==
Lyrics are written by B.K. Harinarayanan and music composed by Ranjin Raj.
