= Padmavyooham =

Padmavyooham may refer to:

- Padmavyuha or Chakravyuha, a circular battle formation as mentioned in ancient Indian texts
- Padmavyooham (1973 film), Indian Malayalam-language film released starring Prem Nazir and Vijayasree
- Padmavyooham (2012 film), Indian Malayalam-language film starring Noby Tharian and Anchal Babu

== See also ==
- Padma (disambiguation)
- Vyuham (disambiguation)
- Chakravyuha (disambiguation)
