= Kek Look Seah Temple =

Chinese temple in Taman Happy of Ipoh, Perak, Malaysia

- Malay: Tokong Kek Look Seah; Chinese: 極樂社
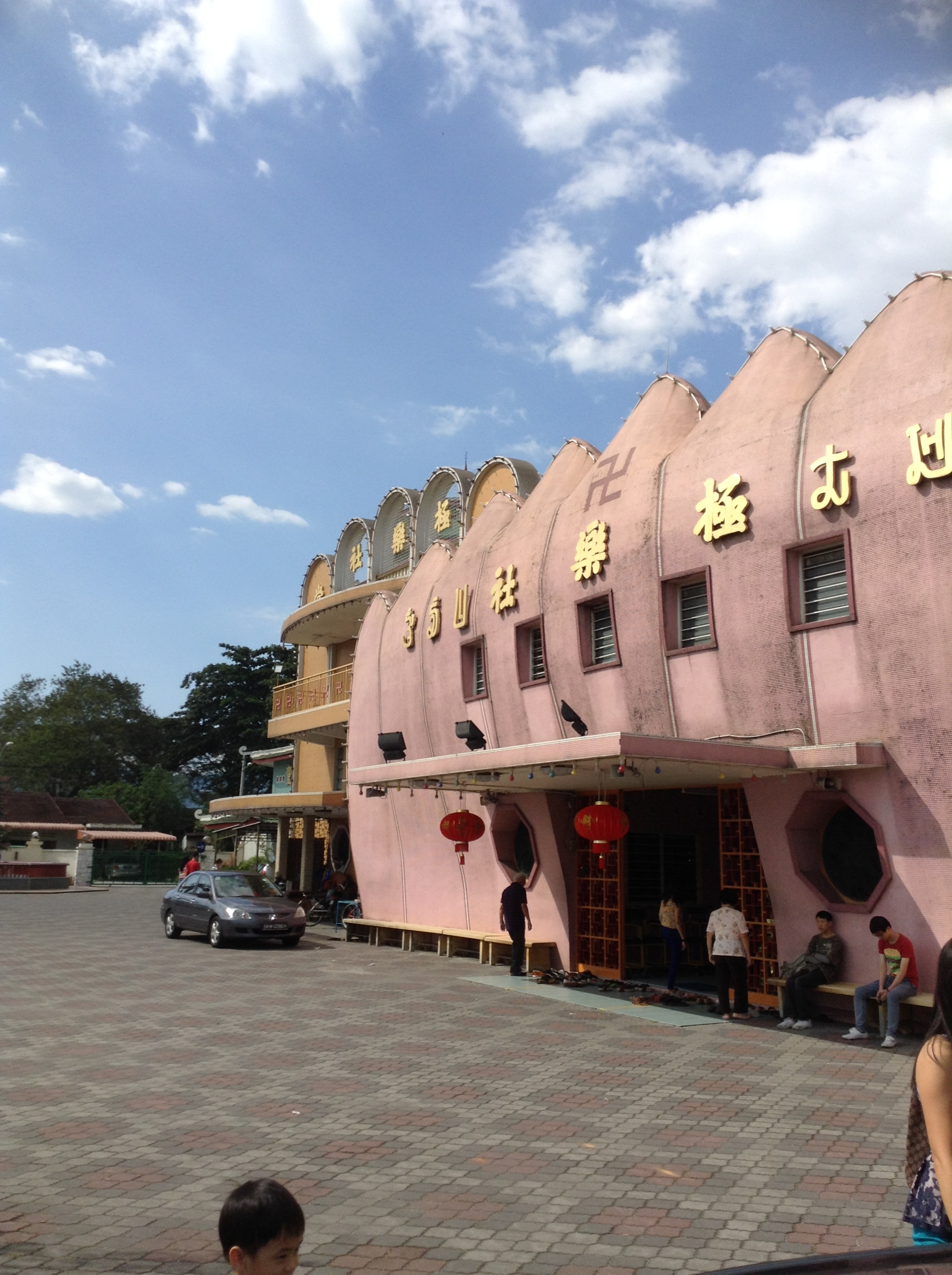
- Front view of the temple

Religion
- Affiliation: Buddhism

Location
- Location: Ipoh
- State: Perak
- Country: Malaysia
- Interactive map of Kek Look Seah Temple
- Coordinates: 4°34′51.002″N 101°4′38.822″E

Architecture
- Type: Chinese temple, pagoda
- Established: 1964

Kek Look Seah Temple (Chinese: 極樂社; also called as Kek Lok Seah Temple) is a Chinese temple located in Taman Happy of Ipoh, Perak, Malaysia. The temple is known for its planchette divination and has a medical room where Chinese medicine is given – which is not common for many Buddhist temple. This persistently making it being mistakenly referred to many people as a Dejiao establishment despite it is a Buddhist temple of Mahāyāna branch.

Kek Look Seah literally means "Sukhāvatī Society" in the Hokkien (Minnan) language.

== History ==
The temple was established in 1960 by a group of like minded Buddhists guided by planchette divination from the Buddhas, in a small terrace house with treatment service of traditional Chinese medicine to those who are in need especially to poor people.

== Features ==
The temple is one of the main Buddhist centre in local community. During Buddha's Birthday (Wesak), the centre with the local supports who stay in the community will organise a great vegetarian feast in front of the altar for prayers before eaten by the attendees. The foods served are all in vegetarian as Buddhist teachings always encourage people to consume more vegetables. The temple also has crematorium services located far from the temple area in Bercham (4°39′20.231″N 101°8′12.943″E).

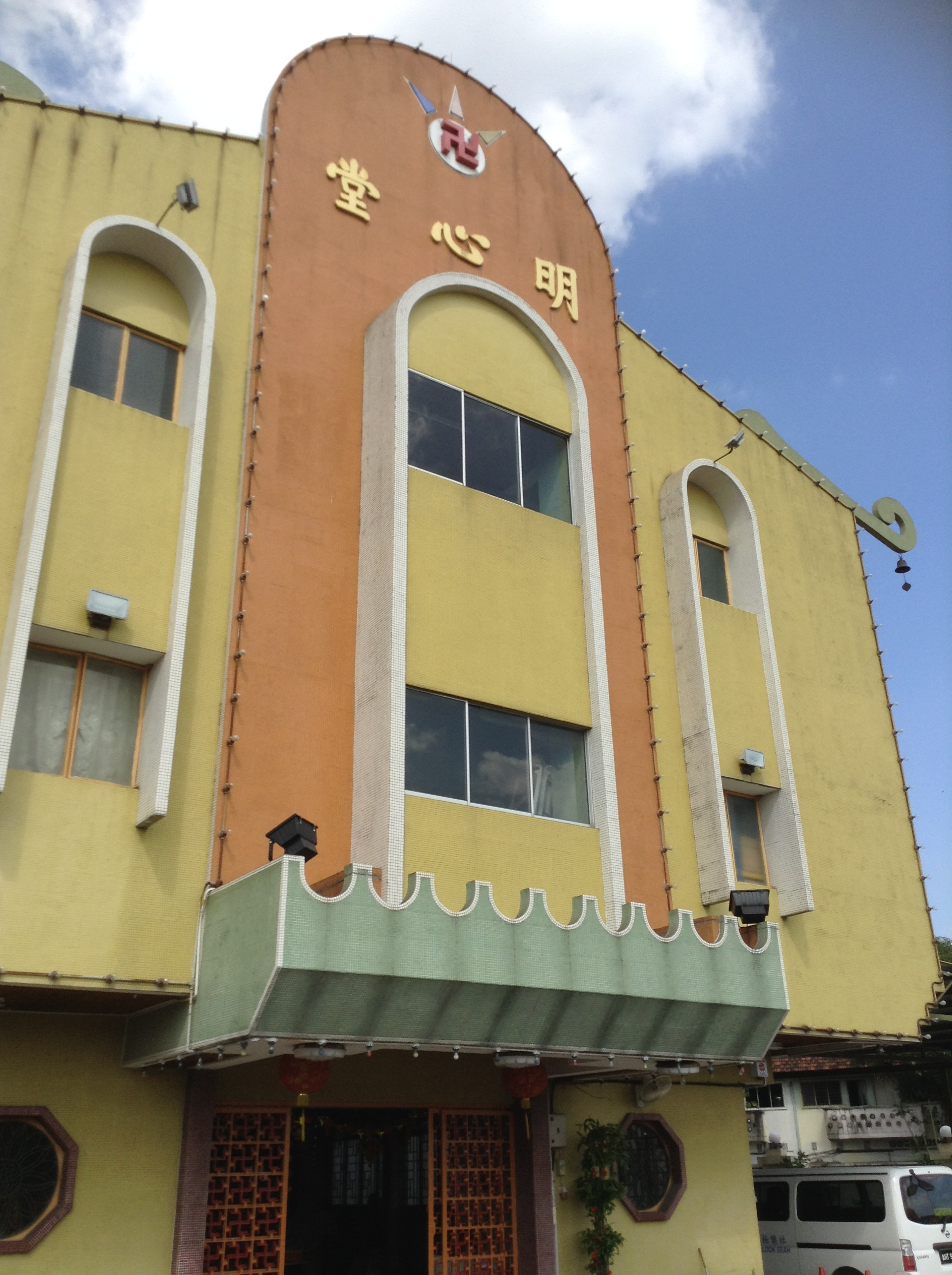
Exterior view of meditation centre at the temple.

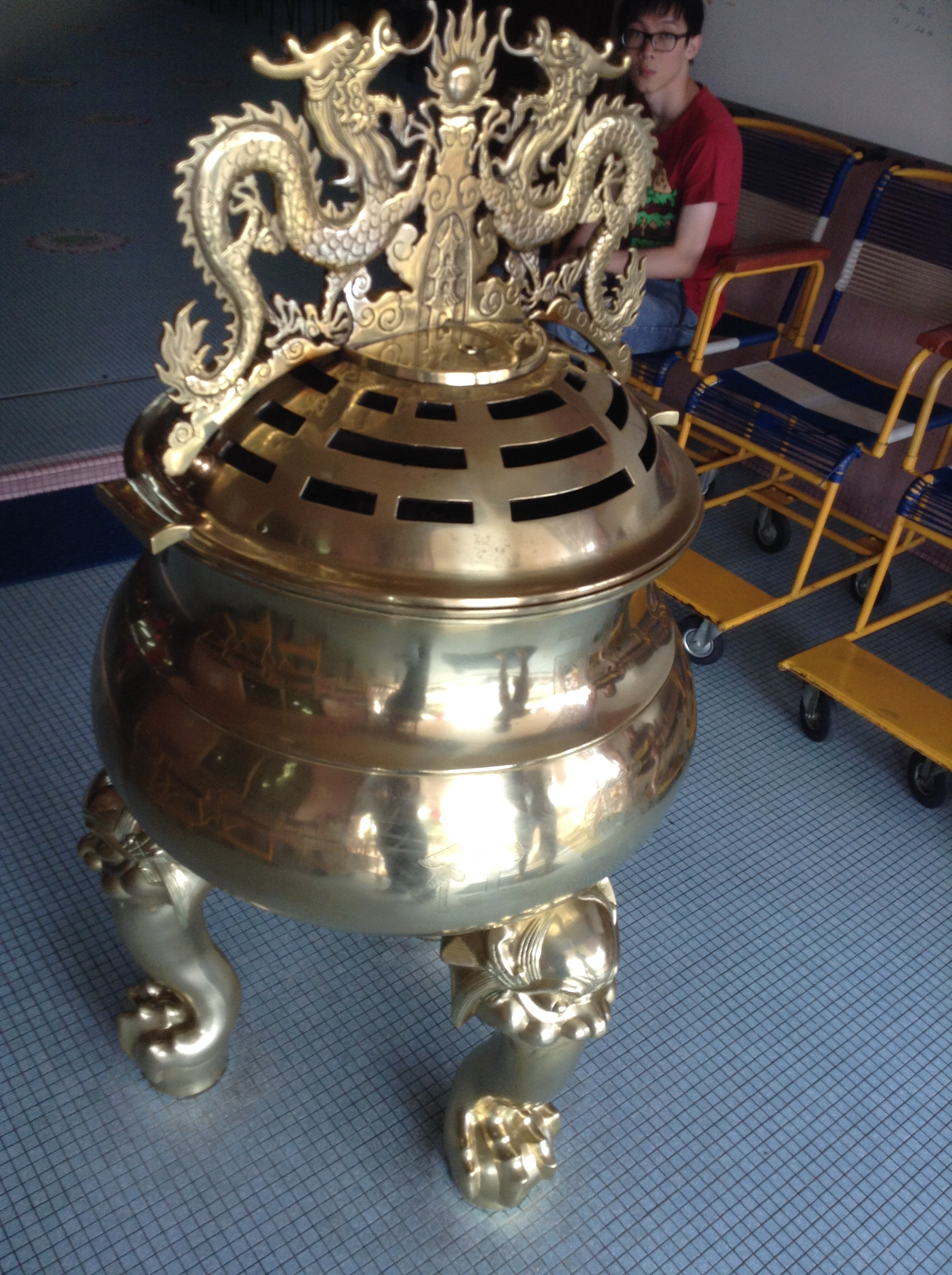
A large urn located in front of the gate at the temple.

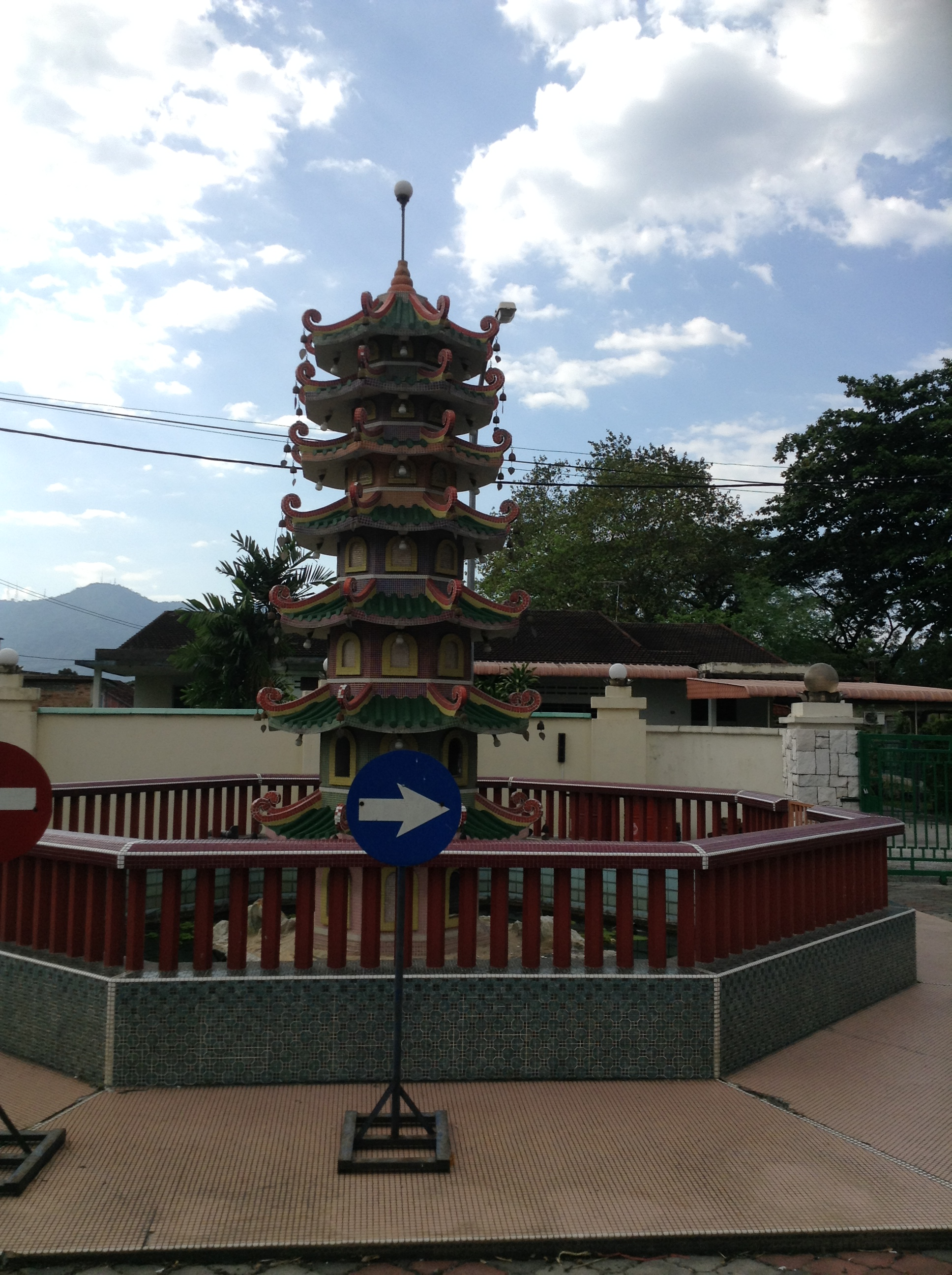
A small pagoda located at the temple with a Chinese architectural and style.

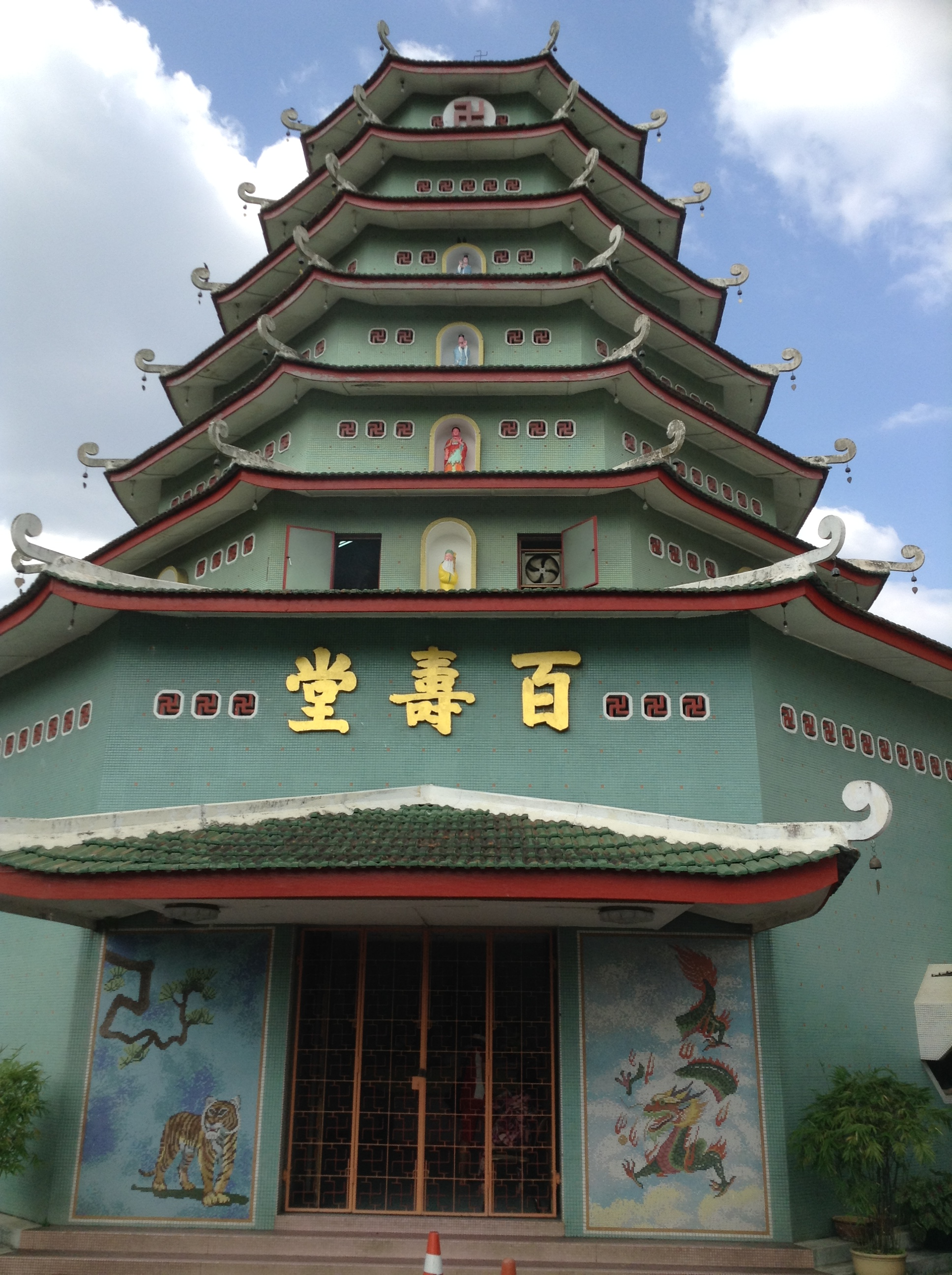
Main pagoda at the temple.

== See also ==
- Kek Lok Si, Penang, Malaysia: shares a similar name in Chinese
