= Jayan Naduvathazhath =

Indian film-maker and screenwriter

- Born: Jayakumar Naduvathazhath; Indian
- Years active: 2017–present

Jayan Naduvathazhath (born Jayakumar Naduvathazhath) is an Indian film maker and screenwriter who works in Malayalam cinema. Jayan's entry into mainstream film industry was as the co-writer of the movie Al Mallu. His web series Christopher and Philucifer aired on Kerala Vision was featured in the list of top 12 highly recommended Malayalam web series by Film Companion. 28, a feature film written and directed by Naduvathazhath won an 'Honourable Mention' award at the 7th Art International Independent Film Festival. 'Sanjay on call', second movie written and directed by Jayan also won several International film awards including Indo French Film Festival, Sweden Film Festival, MADFA etc.

== Filmography ==
Film	Year	Role	Remarks
Guzman Gomaz	2018	Writer-Director	Award Winning Film distributed by Hungama Digital Media Entertainment and Airtel Xstream
Christopher and Philucifer	2018	Writer-Director	Web series on Kerala Vision, Listed in the top 12 highly recommended Malayalam Web series by Film Companion.
28	2019	Writer-Director	Feature film streaming on MX Player, Winner of 'Honourable Mention' award at 7th Art International Independent Film Festival
Life Jor	2019	Writer (Selected Episodes only)	Web series on Mazhavil Manorama
Ponthooval	2019	Director	Documentary Feature
Al Mallu	2020	Story	Feature Film -Directed by Boban Samuel, Starring Namitha Pramod and Miya George
Sanjay on Call	2022	Writer-Director	Feature Film streaming on Saina Play and MX Player, Winner of multiple International Awards like Oniros Film Awards, Sweden Film Festival, Amsterdam Film Festival, MADFA and Indo-French Film Festival.
