= Sukhavati =

Pure land of Amitābha in Mahayana Buddhism

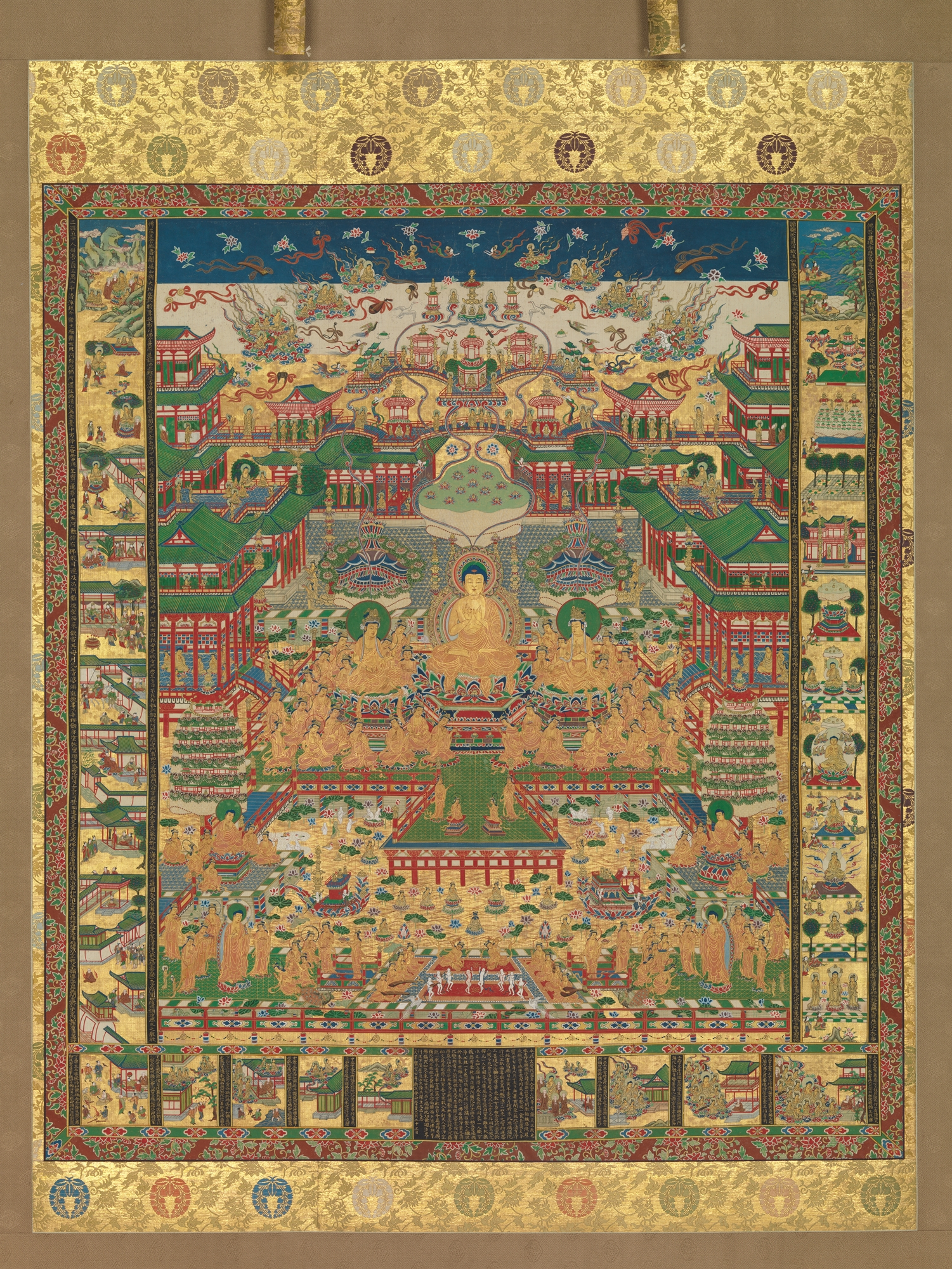
Japanese painting of the Taima Mandala depicting Sukhavati. Kamakura period, 13th century.

Sukhavati (Sanskrit: सुखावती, IAST: Sukhāvatī; "Blissful"; Chinese: 極樂世界, lit. "realm of ultimate bliss") is the Pure Land (or Buddhafield) of the Buddha Amitābha in Mahayana Buddhism. Sukhavati is also called the Land of Bliss or Western Pure Land and is the most well-known of the Mahayana Buddhist pure lands due to the popularity of Pure Land Buddhism in East Asia.

Sukhavati is also an important postmortem goal for Tibetan Buddhists, and is a common Buddhafield used in the practice of phowa ("transference of consciousness at the time of death"). Sukhavati was widely depicted in Mahayana Buddhist art and remains an important theme in Buddhist art.

Different traditions understand the nature of Sukhavati differently. The Pure Land Buddhist traditions often sees it as a Samboghakaya pure land (this was the view of Shandao), while other traditions, like some Tibetan Buddhists, see it as a nirmanakaya Pure Land. Furthermore, in Chinese Buddhism, there are two views on Sukhavati (which are most often combined together): the view which sees Sukhavati as being a realm far away from ours ("other-direction Pure Land") and the view which sees Sukhavati as non-dual with our world which only appears impure due to our minds (known as "mind-only Pure Land").

== In Indian Mahayana sources ==
=== In the Pure Land Sutras ===
Sukhāvatī ("Land of Bliss") is a major setting discussed in the "Three Pure Land Sutras": Sutra of Amitayus, the Contemplation Sutra and the Amitabha Sutra. The Pratyutpanna-samādhi-sūtra is also an important source, particularly for early Chinese Pure Land.

The Larger Sukhāvatīvyūha Sūtra is one of the primary texts that describe the Pure Land of Sukhavati. It details the story of Dharmakara, a bodhisattva who later becomes Amitabha Buddha. Dharmakara, made 48 vows, each describing the characteristics and conditions of his future Pure Land. His 18th vow, the Primal Vow, promises that anyone who sincerely wishes to be reborn in his Pure Land and calls upon his name even ten times will be reborn there, provided they have a genuine intention and do not harbor doubts.

This sutra extensively describes the Pure Land as a place of unimaginable beauty, with crystal-clear waters, jeweled trees, and golden ground. It is a world where suffering, old age, and death do not exist, and it is inhabited by bodhisattvas and beings on the path to enlightenment. The text emphasizes the ease of achieving rebirth in Sukhavati compared to striving for enlightenment in this world of samsara.

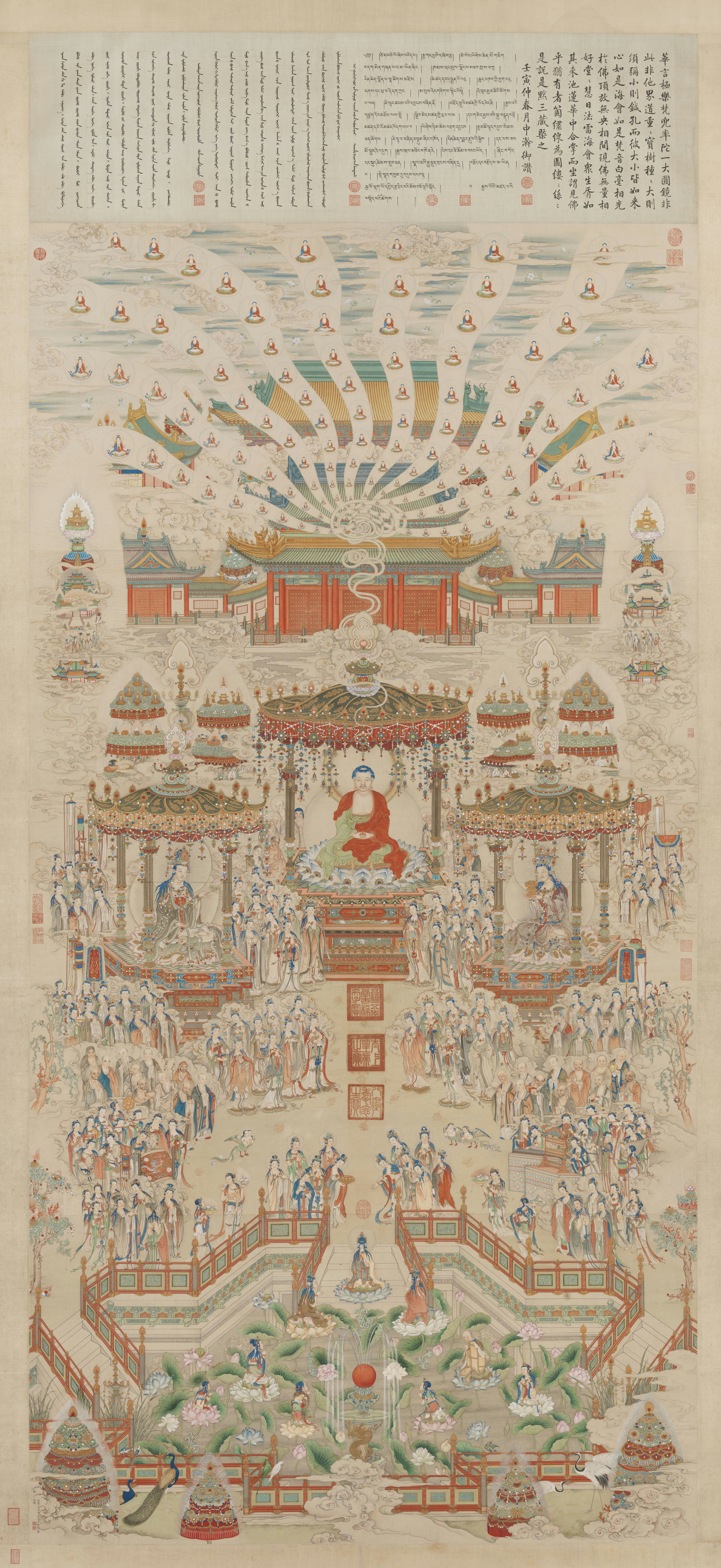
Qing dynasty (1644-1912) painting of Sukhavati by Ding Guanpeng. 18th century, China.

In the Smaller Sūtra, commonly known as the Amitabha Sutra, Buddha Shakyamuni describes the Pure Land of Amitabha to his disciple Śāriputra. The Buddha speaks of the physical and spiritual splendor of Sukhavati, highlighting features such as the seven rows of balustrades, nets, and trees made of the seven precious jewels. He explains that those reborn in this Pure Land will experience perpetual joy and have access to the teachings of the Dharma at all times. This sutra emphasizes the practice of mindfulness of the Buddha (Buddhānusmṛti) as the means of attaining rebirth in Sukhavati.

The Amitayus Contemplation Sutra places greater emphasis on meditation and visualization practice. In this sutra, the Buddha teaches a queen called Vaidehi a series of 16 contemplations, beginning with visualizations of the setting sun, the Pure Land itself, and ultimately Amitabha Buddha and his attendant bodhisattvas, Avalokiteshvara and Mahasthamaprapta. Through these visualizations, practitioners are guided to focus their minds on the Pure Land and develop a connection with Amitabha, cultivating the aspiration for rebirth there.

=== In other Indian sources ===
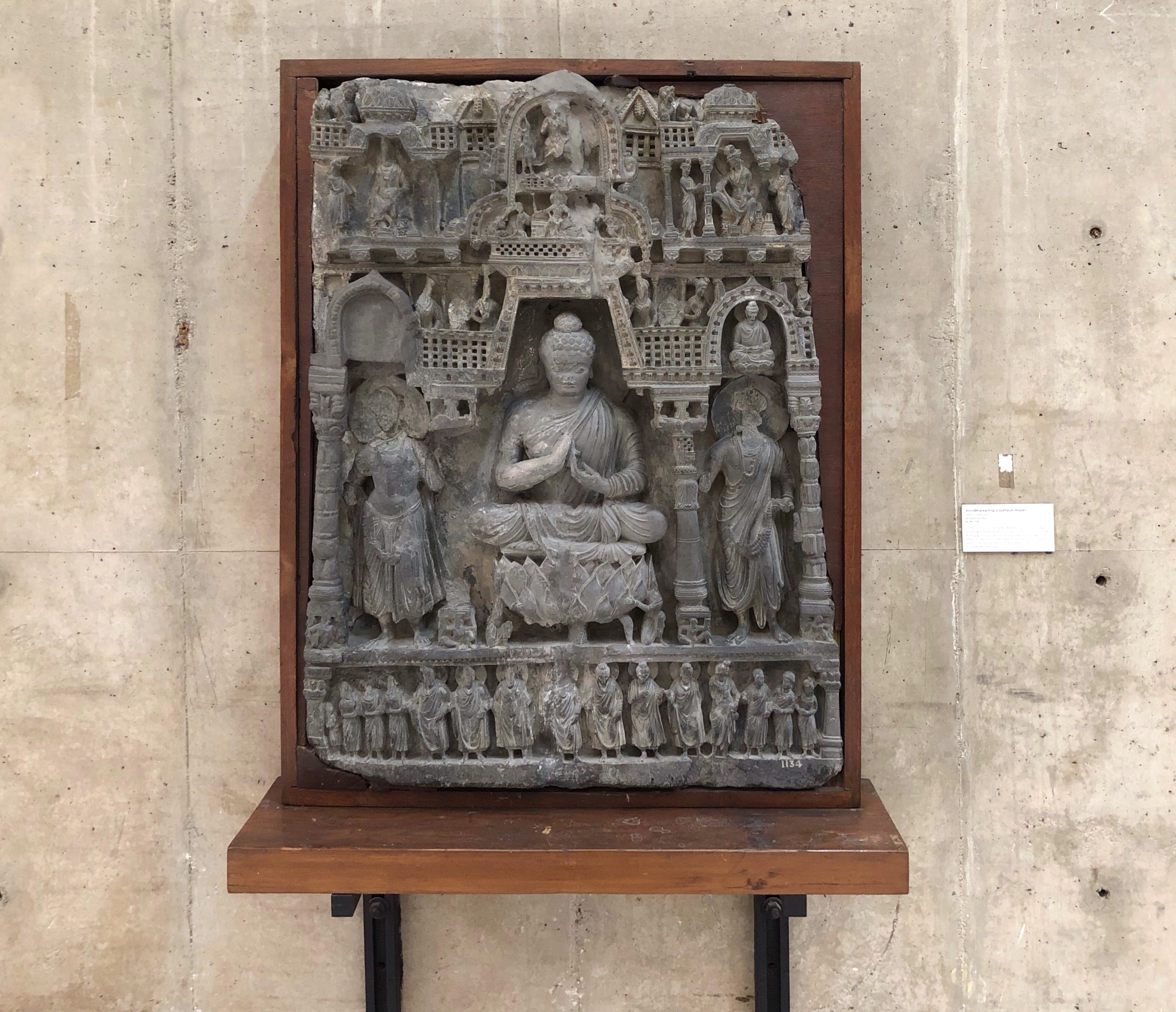
Gandharan sculpture of Amitabha in Sukhavati, 2nd century CE, from Khyber Pakhtunkhwa, Pakistan

Beyond the three primary Pure Land sutras, Sukhavati is also referenced in other Mahayana texts, though less extensively. Some key examples include:

- The Avataṃsaka Sūtra mentions Sukhavati a few times. The very last section of the sutra, called the Aspiration Prayer of Samantabhadra (Bhadracarī), contains aspiration verses to be born in Sukhavati.
- The Lotus Sutra mentions Sukhavati. Avalokitesvara's connection with Amitabha and Sukhavati is also mentioned in the Sanskrit edition and in the Tibetan edition of the Lotus Sutra. These editions have some further passages which mention Amitabha Buddha as well (Hurvitz translation, p. 407).
- Sukhavati is mentioned once in the Pratyutpannasamādhi Sūtra
- Sukhavati is briefly mentioned in the Mahāyāna Mahāparinirvāṇa Sūtra
- Mahāmegha Sutra (The Great Cloud Sutra) - Chapter 38 contains a discussion of a goddess named Stainless Light who will in the future attain Buddhahood by being reborn in Sukhavati.
- The Laṅkāvatāra Sūtra mentions Sukhavati briefly, the passage says: "The Victors emanating as results of the teaching, and those that are projections, all issue from the Blissful land of Infinite Light".
- The Māyopamasamādhi sūtra, named after the so called "illusory absorption", a samadhi taught in Sukhavati. It discusses the origin myths of Avalokiteśvara and Mahāsthāmaprāpta and explains how in the far future, after Amitabha manifests nirvana, Avalokiteśvara will take his place as the lord of Sukhavati.
- Samādhirāja sūtra, the sutra mentions Amitabha and Sukhāvatī in various places (e.g. chapter 33). It also states that whoever hears and upholds the "samadhi" in the sutra (which really refers to a text in this context) will go to Sukhāvatī.
- Kāraṇḍavyūha Sūtra
- Vasubandhu's Discourse on the Pure Land (Jìngtǔ lùn 浄土論), also known as The Rebirth Treatise (往生论), contains a description of Sukhavati in verse and a treatise on how to attain birth there.

Furthermore various Indian Dhāraṇī sutras (sutras focused on specific magical chants, incantations, recitations) state that reciting them will lead to birth in Sukhavati. These include: Amitabha Pure Land Rebirth Dhāraṇī, Uṣṇīṣavijayā Dhāraṇī Sutra, Dhāraṇī of Avalokiteśvara Ekadaśamukha Sūtra, Great Compassion Dhāraṇī Sutra, Sūtra of the Dhāraṇī of the King of the Sound of Amitābha’s Drum, and Mother of Avalokiteśvara Noble Dhāraṇī.

== Etymology and names ==
The word is the feminine form of the Sanskrit word sukhāvat ("full of joy; blissful"), from sukha ("delight, joy") and -vat ("full of").

Sukhavati is known by different names in other languages. East Asian names are based on Chinese translations, and longer names may consist of the words "Western", "Blissful" and "Pure Land" in various combinations. Some names and combinations are more popular in certain countries. Due to its importance, Sukhavati is often simply called "The Pure Land" without distinguishing it from other pure lands.

Chinese-based names
Hanzi	Chinese	Korean	Japanese	Vietnamese	English
極樂	Jílè	Geungnak	Gokuraku	Cực Lạc	Ultimate Bliss
安樂	Ānlè	Annak	Anraku	An Lạc	Peaceful Bliss
淨土	Jìngtǔ	Jeongto	Jōdo	Tịnh Độ	Pure Land
西方淨土	Xīfāng Jìngtǔ	Seobang Jeongto	Saihō Jōdo	Tây Phương Tịnh Độ	Western Pure Land
極樂淨土	Jílè Jìngtǔ	Geungnak Jeongto	Gokuraku Jōdo	Cực Lạc Tịnh Độ	Ultimate Bliss Pure Land
西方極樂淨土	Xīfāng Jílè Jìngtǔ	Seobang Geungnak Jeongto	Saihō Gokuraku Jōdo	Tây Phương Cực Lạc Tịnh Độ	Western Ultimate Bliss Pure Land
西天	Xītiān*			Tây Thiên	Western Heaven
Other names
Tibetan	English				
Dewachen (བདེ་བ་ཅན་)	Blissful				

* Only common in Chinese.

== Buddhist funerals ==
In Tibetan Buddhism, the world of Sukhavati is invoked during Buddhist funerals as a favorable destination for the deceased. Such rituals are often accompanied by the tantric technique of phowa ("transference of consciousness") to the pure land of Amitābha, performed by a lama on the behalf of the departed. Halkias (2013:148) explains that "Sukhavati features in funeral rites and scriptures dedicated to the ritual care of the dead ('das-mchod). The structure and performance of Tibetan death ceremonies varies according to a set sequence of events...For the duration of these rites, the consciousness of the dead is coaxed into increasing levels of clarity until the time for the ritual transference to Sukhavati."

Raigō (来迎, "welcoming approach") in Japanese Buddhism is the appearance of the Amida on a "purple" cloud (紫雲) at the time of one's death. The most popular belief is that the soul would then depart to the Western Paradise. A number of hanging scroll paintings depict the western paradise.

== Namesakes ==
A number of temples are named after Sukhāvatī:

- Kek Lok Si, Malaysia
- Kek Look Seah, Malaysia
- Jile Temple, Harbin, China
- Shinshōgokuraku-ji, Kyoto, Japan

== Gallery ==
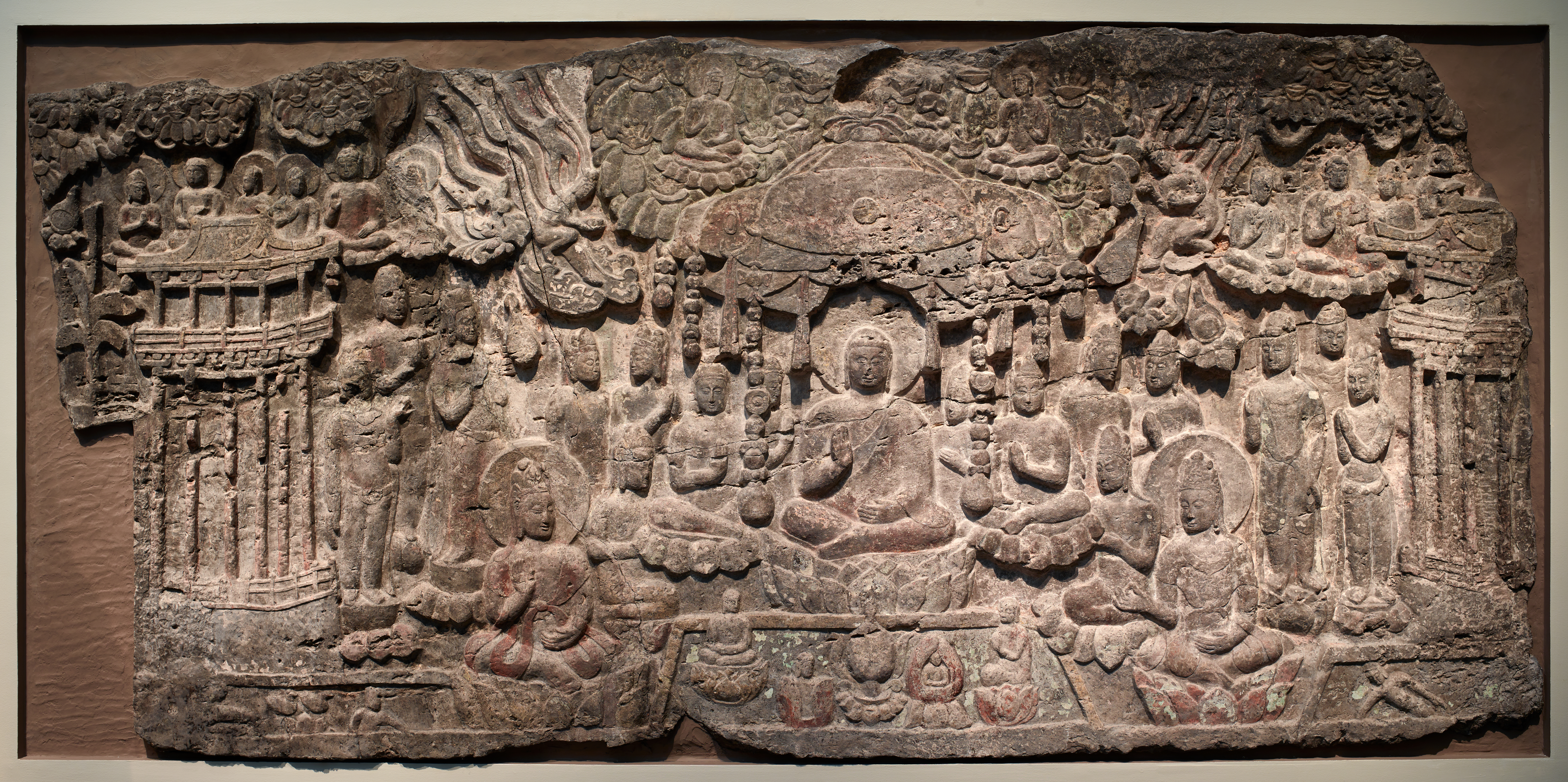
Sukhavati. Northern Qi dynasty, 550-577, China.

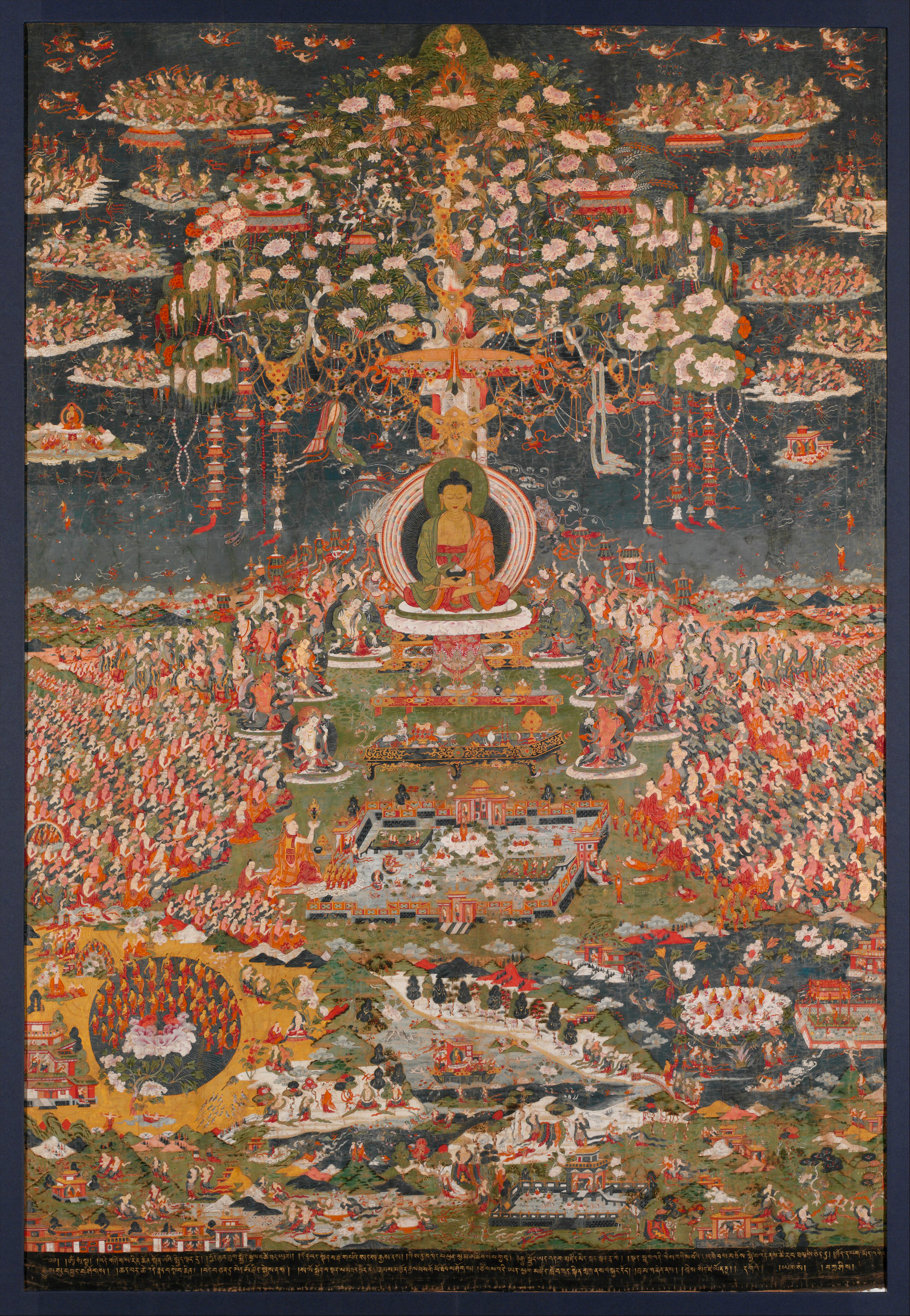
Painting of Amitabha in Sukhavati. Tibet, circa 1700.

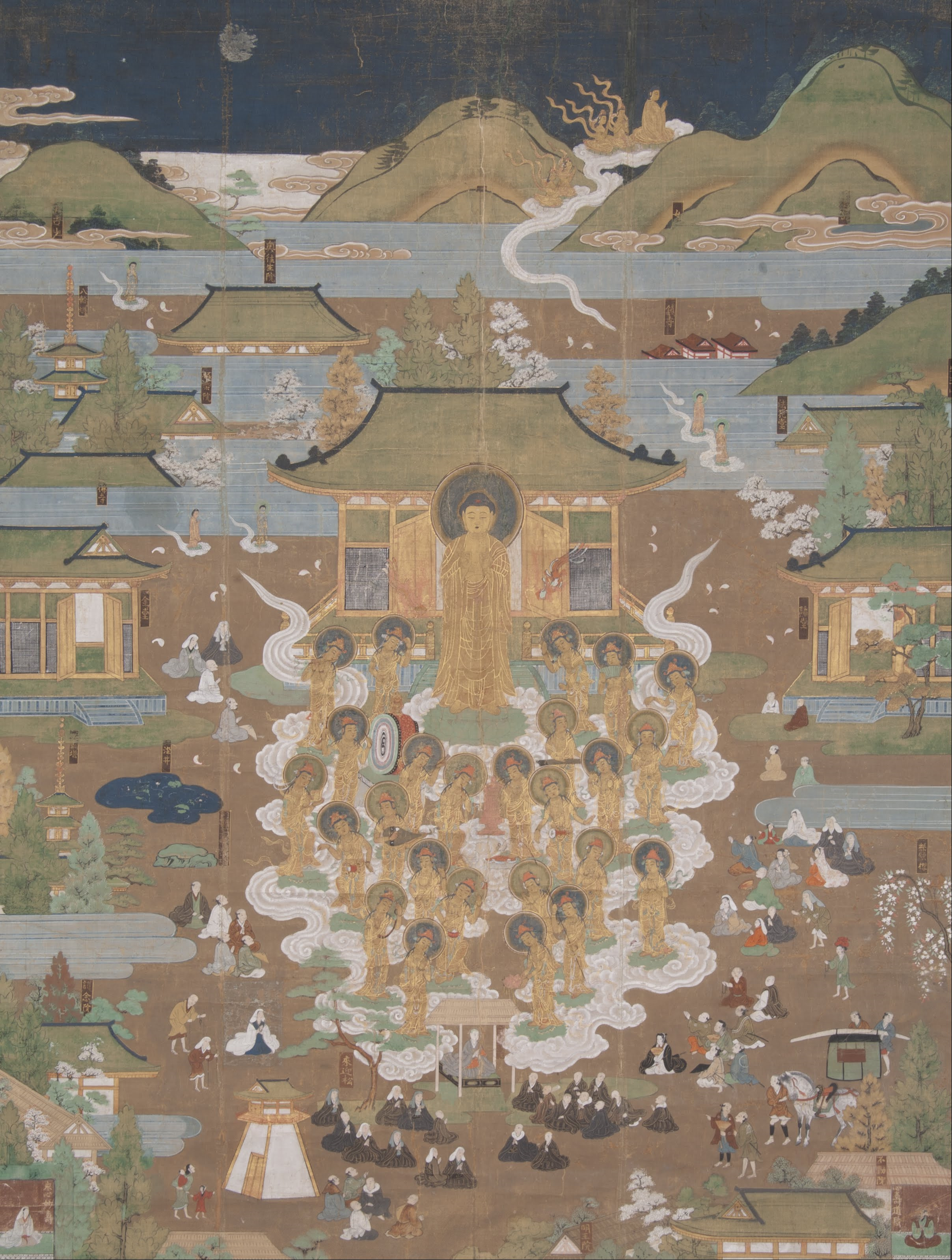
Amitābha welcomes Chūjō-hime to the Western Paradise. Japan, 16th century.

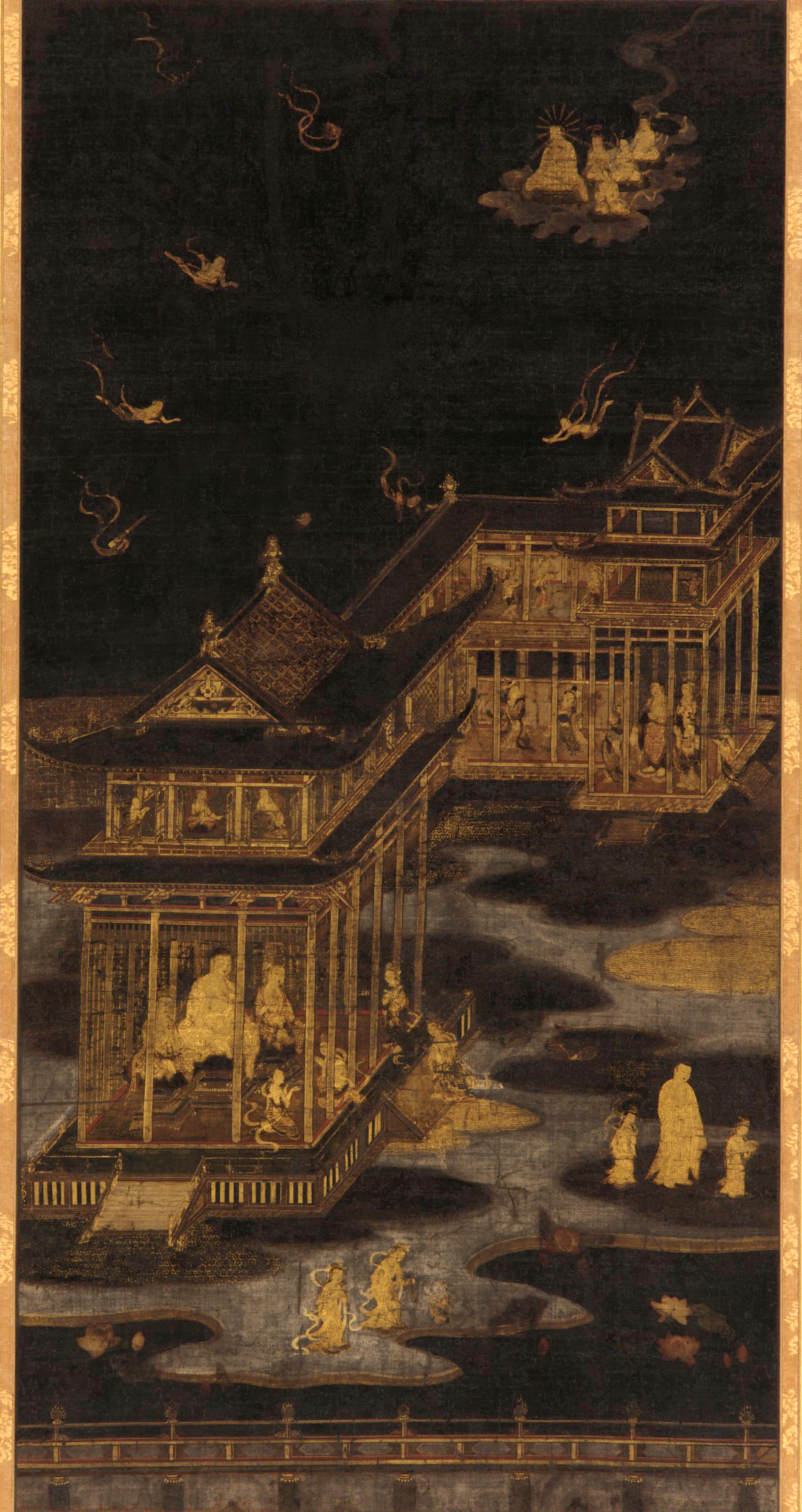
Silk painting of the paradise of Amitabha (Sukhavati). Japan, Heian period, 794–1185

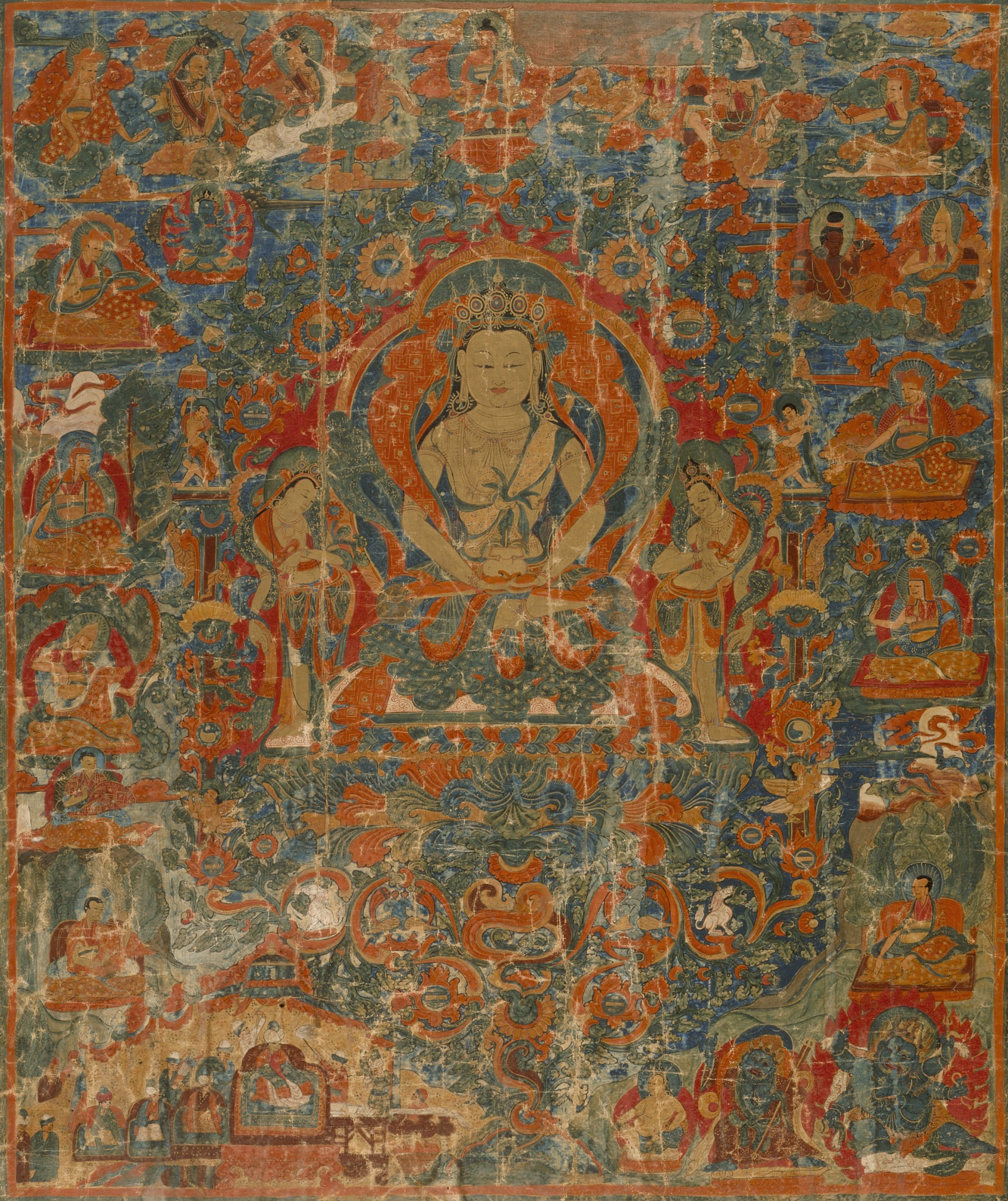
Amitayus in Sukhavati, India, Jammu and Kashmir, Ladakh, Basgo Castle, ca. 1625.

== See also ==
- Sukhāvatīvyūha, two sūtras
- Naraka (concept of hell in Buddhism, Hinduism, Jainism, and Sikhism)
