= Sukhāvatīvyūha Sūtra =

Sukhāvatīvyūha Sūtra ("Sukhāvatī-vyūha") may refer to either of the following sūtras:

- Longer Sukhāvatīvyūha Sūtra, or the Infinite Life Sutra
- Shorter Sukhāvatīvyūha Sūtra, or the Amitabha Sutra

== See also ==
- Sukhāvatī, pure land of the Amitabha Buddha in Mahayana Buddhism
- Vyuham (disambiguation)
