= Chakravyuha (disambiguation) =

Chakravyūha (Sanskrit: चक्रव्यूह), also rendered Chakravyuha, Chakravyuham, Chakravyuh or Chakravuh, is another name for the Padmavyuha, an ancient circular battle formation, a circular trap.

These terms may also refer to:

- Chakravyuha (1978 film), Indian Hindi-language film starring Rajesh Khanna
- Chakravyuha (1983 film), Indian Kannada-language film
- Chakravyuh (2012 film), Indian Hindi-language film
- Chakravyuha (2016 film), Indian Kannada-language film by M. Saravanan
- Chakravyuh – An Inspector Virkar Crime Thriller, Indian web series

== See also ==
- Chakra (disambiguation)
- Vyuham (disambiguation)
- Padmavyooham (disambiguation)
