= Highway (2022 film) =

2022 film by K. V. Guhan

- Digital premier poster
- Directed by: K. V. Guhan
- Written by: K. V. Guhan
- Produced by: Venkat Talati
- Starring: Anand Deverakonda; Abhishek Banerjee; Manasa Radhakrishnan; Saiyami Kher
- Cinematography: K. V. Guhan; Arun Kumar Selvaraj
- Edited by: Tammiraju
- Music by: Simon K. King
- Production companies: Sree Iswarya Lakshmi Movies; Northstar Entertainment
- Distributed by: Aha
- Release date: 19 August 2022
- Running time: 123 minutes
- Country: India
- Language: Telugu

Highway is a 2022 Indian Telugu-language mystery crime thriller film written and directed by K. V. Guhan and, produced by Venkat Talari through Sree Iswarya Lakshmi Movies and Northstar Entertainment. The film features Anand Deverakonda, Manasa Radhakrishnan (in her Telugu debut) and Abhishek Banerjee (in his Telugu debut) in primary roles. Highway was premiered on Aha on 19 August 2022.

== Plot ==
The film starts with Vishnu (Anand Devarakonda) telling his story.

Flashback: Vishnu is a photographer who lives with his mother, sister and grandmother in Hyderabad. He travels to Bangalore with his long-time friend Samudram (Satya) to shoot a wedding while, Asha Bharat (Saiyami Kher) and her team are investigating the case of a serial killer named 'D' (Abhishek Banerjee) who kills young girls for his pleasure. On the other side, Tulasi (Manasa Radhakrishnan), a young, innocent and beautiful village girl who lives with her mother and works in a poultry farm, decides to travel to Mangalore to escape from her landlord's torture to marry her and to meet her father who abandoned them, whereas D kills another girl, making him and Asha come close to meet distance.

On her journey, Tulasi's bus stops near a Dhaba for rest. As she goes to use the washroom, a deaf old woman mistakenly locks her inside. Later, she escapes only to see that she missed the bus. There, a man tries to harass her, but the Dhaba owner, Jaya, saves her and gives her shelter for the night. On the other side, Vishnu's car gets repaired in the middle of the way. He and Samudram fix it back and travel to the Dhaba (Where Tulasi stays) to see Jaya, who is unknowingly Vishnu's aunt and Samudram's childhood crush. There Vishnu meets Tulasi and falls for her at first sight. His aunt gives him the responsibility to drop her to Mangalore, while on the other side D tries to kill the other girl but fails. In that frustration, he kills a small kid who works for her. As Asha comes to investigate, she gets the portrait of D from a lodge owner whom she met before to arrest D, as he stayed there.

During their journey, Tulasi and Vishnu get close and begin to have feelings for each other, but things turn upside down when Vishnu has to urgently leave for Bangalore and drops Tulasi near the Mangalore bus to travel by giving her a phone to call him if any emergency arises. He leaves, but the bus doesn't start, making the passengers get down. Tulasi tries to call him, but the call doesn't get connected. There she meets the man who tried to harass her near the Dhaba. He gives her a lift by blackmailing her, but shifts the route and tries to assault her again. While trying to escape from him, Tulasi calls Vishnu; even though it gets connected, they fail to talk. An enthusiastic D, who sees this, saves Tulasi from him only to kidnap her in the name of help. Poor Tulasi, unaware of all these, trusts him.

Vishnu regrets leaving Tulasi alone. Samudram understands his situation and asks him to go back to Tulasi while he travels alone to Bangalore. Vishnu travels back to the place he left Tulasi and brings the man who tried to harass her to the police. There, he decodes that D has kidnapped Tulasi and registers the complaint with Asha. He takes a pic of the portrait of D, and they begin to search for Tulasi but in vain. Meanwhile, when D tries to kill Tulasi, he accidentally slips into a river, but Tulasi saves him, changing his intention to kill her. Later, Vishnu sees a courier company, DHDC, on his way and asks their help to find Tulasi, to which they agree.

After a lot of searching, Vishnu gets a message from the company's driver, who finds Tulasi with D in his ambulance, and they forward it to him, and he shares the same with Asha. Asha and her assistant, who decodes D's location, try to arrest him, but he overtakes them by taking the gun and shoots them. A terrified Tulasi tries to escape, but he threatens her and forcefully takes her away.

Vishnu comes to the location and sees the assistant dead and Asha alive with injuries. He takes her to the govt hospital nearby and leaves to save Tulasi.

Present: D takes Tulasi to a forest in a truck by killing a passerby. He tells her his motives behind the murders - He was an ordinary ambulance driver who used to enjoy when someone lost their lives. Soon, he meets a beautiful girl and decides to change and lead a peaceful life with her, but she leaves him for another rich guy she meets, making D go mad. An enraged D later kills her and finds the same happiness in killing other similar girls like his lover. D also explains to Tulasi that the difference he saw between them and her is that she is all alone and no one will come to save her.

Before they could complete their conversation, Vishnu arrives to save Tulasi. Tulasi attacks D and goes back to Vishnu, but D comes in between them and tries to kill them both, while a tiger from the forest arrives on time and attacks D. It kills him as its prey while Tulasi and Vishnu reunite.

The film ends with Tulasi and Vishnu telling the entire story to the media, leaving the nation in shock.

== Cast ==
- Anand Deverakonda as Vishnu, Tulasi's love interest
- Manasa Radhakrishnan as Tulasi, Vishnu's love interest
- Abhishek Banerjee as D, A serial killer
- Saiyami Kher as Asha Bharath, A police officer investigating D's case
- John Vijay as The person who tries to harass Tulasi
- Reshma Pasupuleti as Jaya, Vishnu's aunt and Samudram's long time crush
- Satya as Samudram, Vishnu's friend and career partner

== Production ==
After watching Abhishek Banerjee's performance in the Hindi web series Paatal Lok, Guhan cast him for the role of a serial killer. The film's launch event with a puja ceremony was held in May 2021. It was extensively shot on the highways near Hyderabad, Araku Valley and Chikmagalur in approximately forty days. Filming was wrapped up in October 2021.

== Soundtrack ==
The film score and soundtrack album of the film is composed by Simon K. King. The music rights were acquired by Aditya Music.

No.	Title	Lyrics	Singer(s)	Length
1.	"Kommallo"	Ananta Sriram	Sanah Moidutty, Yazin Nizar	4:37
2.	"Oohicha Ledhu Kadhe"	Sri Mani	Yazin Nizar	3:19

== Release and reception ==
Highway was premiered on Aha on 19 August 2022.

Neeshita Nyayapati of The Times of India gave a rating of 2 out of 5 and wrote that "Highway is passable fare at best, but given the kind of talent involved in the project, you can’t help but wonder if the story had the potential to be fleshed out better". Balakrishna Ganeshan of The News Minute also gave same rating and wrote that "Highway sticks true to the crime thriller genre without meandering into unnecessary details or scenes".

Writing for The Hindu, Sangeetha Devi Dundoo opined that the film "unfolds on familiar lines and delivers thrills from time to time. However, it falls short in the final portions that seem stretched and dilute the potential for a nail-biting finish". India Today's Roktim Rajpal stated: "Highway had the potential to be a dark and disturbing thriller but it ends up being a damp squib".
