= Guzman Gomaz =

- Directed by: Jayan Naduvathazhath
- Screenplay by: Jayan Naduvathazhath; Dr.Rajad R
- Story by: Jayan Naduvathazhath
- Produced by: Benz Vasu
- Starring: Chandradasan
- Distributed by: Hungama Digital Media Entertainment
- Release date: 2019
- Running time: 12 minutes
- Country: India

Guzman Gomaz is an Indian Malayalam short film directed by Jayan Naduvathazhath streaming on Hungama Digital Media Entertainment.

== Plot ==
Guzman Gomaz- Fantasy fiction thriller short film set in the backdrop of period gang-wars. When young aspiring gangster Gomaz tries to dethrone the ultimate don Guzman, he encounters unforeseen hurdles in the form of his rival's Immortal Bodyguard Carlos. All he has to do to become the king of the underworld is to kill the unconquerable Don Guzman and his 'Black magic'.

== Cast ==
- Chandradasan as Guzman
- Prasanth V as Gomaz
- Vinodh Mohanan as Danny
- Nakshatara Menon as Daughter
- Tanmay as Little Danny

== Awards and nominations ==
- Semi-Finalist KISFF
- Semi-Finalist NanoCon Film Festival
- Official Selection Inshort Film Festival
- Official Selection Lift-off Film Festival
