= Vikadakumaran =

- Theatrical release poster
- Directed by: Boban Samuel
- Written by: Y. V. Rajesh
- Produced by: Arun Ghosh; Bijoy Chandran
- Starring: Vishnu Unnikrishnan; Manasa Radhakrishnan
- Cinematography: Ajay David Kachappilly
- Edited by: Deepu Joseph
- Music by: Songs: Rahul Raj; Background score: Bijibal
- Production company: Chand V Creations
- Release date: 29 March 2018
- Country: India
- Language: Malayalam

Vikadakumaran is a 2018 Indian Malayalam-language comedy film directed by Boban Samuel and written by Y. V. Rajesh. The film stars Vishnu Unnikrishnan and Manasa Radhakrishnan. It was produced by Arun Ghosh and Bijoy Chandran under the banner of Chand V Creations.

== Cast ==
- Vishnu Unnikrishnan as Advocate Binu Sebastian Choorezhan
- Manasa Radhakrishnan as Sindhu, Binu's love interest
- Jinu Joseph as Roshi Balachandran main antagonist
- Dharmajan Bolgatty as Manikandan, Binu's assistant
- Rafi as Magistrate Solomon Mathew Puthanpallil
- Baiju Santhosh as Advocate Sundareshan Nadar (KD)
- Devika Nambiar as Rosy, Binu's Sister
- Sunil Sukhada as Pappan
- Mahesh as Renjith
- Jayan Cherthala as Advocate Harihara Iyer (Swami)
- Aruldoss as DSP Paul Raj IPS, Tamil Nadu Police
- Shaju Sreedhar as Salim
- Arun Ghosh as C.I Anirudhan
- Indrans as Sukumaran Pillai, Home guard
- Sreeya Remesh as Leela
- Rosin Jolly as Aishwarya Nair, film actress
- Megha Mathew as Adv.Mini
- Nizhalgal Ravi as Tamil Nadu Police Superintendent
- EA Rajendran as Sudhakaran
- Nelson Sooranad as Sindhu's Father
- Babu Annur as Anthony
- Vineeth Thattil as Thief
- Jayaraj Warrier as Karunan Maash
- Mukesh Nair as Sudhakaran's Assitant
- Aanand as Leela's Husband
- Seema G Nair as Binu's mother
- Jolly Eeshow as Soliman's Wife
- Bindu Aneesh as Paul Raj's Wife
- Abhilash Kottarakkara as gunda
- Salim Kumar as Binu's Father (Photo Presence Only)

== Release ==
Vikadakumaran was released on 29 March 2018 in India.
