= Vyuham (2024 film) =

- Theatrical release poster
- Directed by: Ram Gopal Varma
- Written by: Ram Gopal Varma
- Produced by: Dasari Kiran Kumar
- Starring: Ajmal Ameer; Manasa Radhakrishnan; Dhanunjay Prabhune; Kota Jayaram
- Cinematography: Sajeesh Rajendran
- Edited by: Manish Thakur
- Music by: Anand
- Production company: RGV Den Products
- Distributed by: Ramadhuta Creations
- Release date: 2 March 2024
- Running time: 127 minutes
- Country: India
- Language: Telugu

Vyuham, also known as Vyooham, is a 2024 Indian Telugu-language biographical political thriller film written and directed by Ram Gopal Varma. The film revolves around the unexpected events that led to the untimely death of former Chief Minister of Andhra Pradesh Y. S. Rajasekhara Reddy and the subsequent events surrounding the creation of the YSR Congress Party, led by his son Y. S. Jagan Mohan Reddy. The first part of the film was theatrically released on 2 March 2024, and the Part II titled Shapatham was released on 8 March 2024.

== Cast ==
- Ajmal Ameer as Y. S. Jagan Mohan Reddy
- Manasa Radhakrishnan as Y. S. Bharati
- Dhanunjay Prabhune as N. Chandrababu Naidu
- Vasu Inturi
- Kota Jayaram
- Rekha Prakash
- Surabhi Prabhavathi
- Elena Tuteja

== Production ==
The principal photography was in progress as at August 2023.

== Soundtrack ==
Vyooham

Film score by Balaji
- Released: 2023–2024
- Genre: Feature film soundtrack
- Length: 29:04
- Language: Telugu
- Label: Mango Music

Balaji chronology
Vyooham (2023)	Shapatham (2024)

Official audio
- Vyooham Telugu Movie Audio Jukebox on YouTube

No.	Title	Lyrics	Singer(s)	Length
1.	"Deeksha"	Rajasekhar Sudmoon	Sukhwinder Singh	4:18
2.	"YSRCP"	Ranjith Kumar Ricky	Rahul Sipligunj, Rohini	4:02
3.	"Yedavakandi"	Rajasekhar Sudmoon	RGV, Keertana Sesh	3:16
4.	"Raavali Jagan"	Rajasekhar Sudmoon	Keertana Sesh	3:46
5.	"Deva"	Ranjith Kumar Ricky. Rajasekhar Sudmoon	Keertana Sesh, Hymath Mohammed, Harsha Chavali, Naresh Mamindla, Sreedeep.K, Maruthi Kodimoju	2:57
6.	"Ja Ja Jagan"	Rajasekhar Sudmoon	Keertana Sesh, Vinayak, Harsha Chavali, Naresh Mamindla, Sreedeep.K, Maruthi Kodimoju	3:20
7.	"Jagananna"	Ranjith Kumar Ricky	Venky	2:30
8.	"Nijam"	Ranjith Kumar Ricky	Vinayak	2:02
9.	"Vyooham"	Rajasekhar Sudmoon	Keertana Sesh	2:50
Total length:				29:04

== Controversies ==
=== Suspension of release ===
The film was initially scheduled for 10 November 2023, but was delayed due to a member of the censor board refusing to certify the film, after they received a letter from Nara Lokesh urging not to certify the film. Afterwards, it was temporarily suspended by Telangana High Court until 11 January 2024. The hearing was scheduled to be held on 8 January 2024.

=== Propaganda accusations ===
Nara Lokesh, son of N. Chandrababu Naidu, expressed concern that this movie was shot with the intention of tarnishing his father's image. CBFC has once already refused to certify the film by raising objections on content, and has commented the film as an attempt to spread propaganda.

Congress leader Nageswara Rao filed a petition in High court of Telangana citing that the film depicts Sonia Gandhi with a negative image.

== Certification ==
On 13 December 2023, the film has received U certificate from Central Board of Film Certification.
