= Romans (2013 film) =

- Theatrical release poster
- Directed by: Boban Samuel
- Written by: Y. V. Rajesh
- Produced by: Arun Ghosh; Bijoy Chandran
- Starring: Kunchacko Boban; Biju Menon; Nivetha Thomas; Lalu Alex; Vijayaraghavan
- Cinematography: Vinod Illampally
- Edited by: Lijo Paul
- Music by: Songs: M. Jayachandran; Background Score: Bijibal
- Production company: Chand V Creations
- Distributed by: Chand V Creations; Popcorn Entertainments
- Release date: 17 January 2013
- Running time: 154 minutes
- Country: India
- Language: Malayalam
- Budget: ₹ 4–4.5 crore
- Box office: ₹15 crore (US$1.6 million)

Romans is a 2013 Indian Malayalam-language comedy thriller mystery film directed by Boban Samuel. The film is produced by Arun Ghosh and Bijoy Chandran under the banner Chand V Creations. The film stars Kunchacko Boban, Biju Menon, Nivetha Thomas, Lalu Alex and Vijayaraghavan.. The core plots were inspired from 1989 American comedy film We're No Angels, directed by Neil Jordan.

The film released on 17 January 2013, and received positive responses from critics. The film was an all-time blockbuster at the box office.

== Plot ==
Akash and Shibu are two convicted criminals. They are being transported to a jail with another convict via train. Shibu and the other convict beat the cops traveling with them and Shibu jumps out of the train with an unwilling Akash.

Meanwhile, not so far away is a village called Poomala, which is on the Kerala – Tamil Nadu border. Poomala is home to a famous century-old Latin Catholic church which had been closed for years. Thommichan is the only prominent and wealthy man in the village and is highly respected by the townsfolk. He attempts to get two priests to come and reopen their church, however they are unwilling to come. Thommichan however mishears them saying that they will come and starts preparations to welcome them.

By coincidence, Akash and Shibu reach Poomala the day the new priests are supposed to arrive. They end up reaching the church and find themselves surrounded by the townsfolk. However, they soon realize that the people have mistaken them to be the new priests. To evade capture and hide until they receive help from Shibu's friend, the men decide to pretend to be priests. Akash becomes Fr. Paul and Shibu becomes Fr. Sebastian aka Sebu.

As their masquerade continues, the men find luck on their side as their doings end up having positive effects and strengthening the belief of the townspeople. Shibu causes the old, unused church bell to fix itself while he was trying to steal it. Later, the men accidentally cure the insanity of the mother of Mathukutty, a tailor. The crazed woman attacks them and unknowingly hits an open socket and gets electrocuted, which cures her. But the event leaves Geevarghese, a preacher who does not like the new priests to unknowingly get electrocuted and become insane. These incidents also make the people believe that the new priests have divine powers.

All the while however, Akash and Shibu hear the people saying that they "came even after knowing everything". Perplexed, they ask Achankunju, the sexton, about the matter and he tells them about the past of the church.

Years ago, the kind-hearted Fr. Rodriguez was the priest in charge of the church. A girl fell in love with him and committed suicide after revealing her feelings to him. When the townsfolk got wind of this, they went to question Fr. Rodriguez, who by then had committed suicide out of guilt. It is believed that his ghost has placed a curse on the church. Every priest who has come to this church has died mysteriously on the day of the Perunnal or the Church Festival, which is why no one was interested in coming and reopening the church.

Akash and Shibu are terrified after learning the truth and plan to escape. Furthermore, Akash realizes that he knows Thommichan's elder daughter, Eleena, and she knows who Akash really is. Akash was a talented magician who performed shows to fund his little sister's medical needs. He met Eleena during a function at her college, where after a brief conflict, they became friends. He however was arrested for cheating and robbery, losing Eleena's trust in the process. She at first threatens to expose the men, but later forgives them after knowing of their unintentional good deeds.

Akash and Shibu's attempt to flee ends up failing, as they somehow circle back and end up in Poomala again. Finally, Shibu plans to steal some ornaments brought for the Perunnal and escape. But Akash opposes him, leading to a fight where Shibu locks him in a room and runs away. Achankunju frees Akash, who finds out that Shibu has not run away and they reconcile.

Later, on the Perunnal Day, they perform the ritual where the priests are said to die. Akash says that Fr. Rodriguez is the cause of the curse and moves to destroy his gravestone. But before he could do anything, he seemingly bleeds to death. When the townsfolk start to blame and criticize Fr. Paul/Akash, Fr.Sebu/Shibu angrilly insults Fr. Rodriguez. This enrages Pappichayan, an elderly photographer who is highly respected in the village. He shouts that the church should be destroyed and a new church in Fr. Rodriguez's name should be built in its place.

Just then, the seemingly dead Fr. Paul/Akash gets up and reveals that he faked his death to bring out the truth in front of the townsfolk. He reveals that Pappichayan is the father of Fr. Rodriguez. He has blamed the village for his son's death and has been killing every priest who comes to the church by poisoning the Vayanayappam, a food which the priests eat during the ritual, thus making it look like a curse or a mysterious death. It is revealed that Shibu saw Pappichayan poisoning the Vayanayappam the night he tried to run away with the loot. This made him return and reveal the facts to Akash. To avoid exposing Fr. Sebu/Shibu, Fr. Paul/Akash lies that Fr. Sebu/Shibu had a premonition in which he saw the truth and the townsfolk blindly believe them (since they think the priests have mystical powers). Pappichayan is subsequently arrested, while Fr. Paul/Akash asks the people to forgive Fr. Rodriguez, believing that it may have been Fr. Rodriguez's spiritual intervention that helped them uncover the truth.

Later in the church, the priests ask the townsfolk to close their eyes for prayer. When everyone is praying, Akash and Shibu escape. While running, Akash sees Eleena, who by now has reconciled with him, and she motivates him to keep going. But they soon are caught by the police. The police inspector Vetrimaaran, who has been hunting the duo since their escape, tells the men that he knows what they did in Poomala and as a reward, their punishment will be reduced. Akash smiles and winks at Eleena, as the cops take him and Shibu away.

Sometime later, it is shown that the people of Poomala are still oblivious to the truth about the priests and think of them to be god's angels. The end credit scenes shows two men in Santa Claus costumes celebrating Christmas with the elderly. The men are revealed to be Akash and Shibu, who have once again escaped from prison.

== Cast ==
- Kunchacko Boban as Akash / Fr. Paul
- Biju Menon as Shibu / Fr. Sebastian a.k.a. Fr. Sebu
- Nivetha Thomas as Eleena
- Lalu Alex as Thommichan
- TG Ravi as Pappichayan, The Main Antagonist
- Vijayaraghavan as Fr. Gabriel
- Arun Ghosh as Fr. Rodriguez/Antony
- Mithili Krishna as Annie aka Annamma
- Nelson Sooranad as Geevarghese
- Kalabhavan Shaju as Mathukkutty
- Kochu Preman as Achankunju, the sexton
- Jaffar Idukki as Durai Raj
- Joice Nadakapadom as Joy
- Gayathri as Thommichan's wife
- Devu Krishnan as Reena
- Shalu Kurian as Gracy
- Santhakumari as Pappi's wife
- Swati Verma as Kathreena
- Jayan Cherthala as Police Sub-inspector Eanashu
- Thomas Unniyadan as the MLA (Cameo)
- Geetha Salam as Aravindan, the oracle
- Kalabhavan Haneef as Andrews, lottery salesman
- Shivaji Guruvayoor as Bishop Idachal
- Lishoy as Akash's father
- Nizhalgal Ravi as C.I. Vetrimaran
- Ponnamma Babu as Mathukutty's mother
- Joy Pallassery as Jose
- Sreekala Thaha as Jose's wife
- Sreelakshmi as Jose's daughter
- Vimal Raj
- Venu Machad

== Release ==
Romans released on 17 January 2013 in 74 cinemas across Kerala, receiving positive response from critics. The film was a notable commercial success at the box office and ran for over 100 days in theatres. Satyam Audios released the Blu-ray, DVD and VCD of Romans on 20 May 2013.

== Reception ==
=== Critical reception ===
Some critics noted that the plot was similar to the 1989 Neil Jordan film We're No Angels.

A critic from The Times of India wrote that "A comedy revolving around two fraud priests, Romans works to an extent, courtesy Biju Menon and a tale that does not fail to flutter if not create a storm". Smitha of One India gave the movie 3.5/5 stars, stating that "Romans is a comic caper and you will have plenty of reasons to laugh your heart out!"

IndiaGlitz gave the movie 6.5/10 stars, concluding that "Romans is targeted at the massive number of spectators who relish zany capers. If you are a member of this group, it's double the fun and guffaws this time; almost sure in leading to another commercial hit."

=== Box office ===
The film was commercial success. The film was made at a budget of ₹ 4.5 crore, including print and publicity cost. The film ran for over 125 days in theatres and grossed a total of over ₹15 crore from the Kerala box office.

== Soundtrack ==
All lyrics are written by Rajeev Alunkal; all music is composed by M. Jayachandran and Band Vidwan.

No.	Title	Artist(s)	Length
1.	"Arthunkale Palliyil"	Vijay Yesudas, Sudeep Kumar
2.	"Kuyil Paadiyoru"	Vijay Yesudas, Merin Gregory
3.	"Mele Maanathoodaano"	Vivek Thomas, Anoop Mohandas
4.	"Sarvadayaaparane"	Anwar Sadat
