= Boban Samuel =

Indian film director

- Occupations: Film director; actor
- Years active: 2011–present
- Spouse: Reshmi Boban

Boban Samuel is an Indian film director and actor most known for his work in Malayalam films. He has directed films such as Janapriyan (2011), Romans (2013), Happy Journey (2014), Shajahanum Pareekuttiyum (2016), Vikadakumaran (2018) and Al Mallu (2020).

== Filmography ==
Year	Film	Director	Actor	Role	Ref
2011	Janapriyan	Yes	No	–	
2013	Romans	Yes	No	–	
2014	Happy Journey	Yes	No	–	
2015	Thinkal Muthal Velli Vare	No	Yes	Himself	
2016	Shajahanum Pareekuttiyum	Yes	No	–	
2016	Kattappanayile Rithwik Roshan	No	Yes	Himself	
2018	Vikadakumaran	Yes	No	–	
2020	Al Mallu	Yes	No	–	
2020	Anjaam Pathiraa	No	Yes	DySP Abraham Koshi	
2021	Drishyam 2	No	Yes	DySP Reghuram	
2021	Ameera	No	Yes		
2022	Antakshari	No	Yes	Unni	
2022	Karnan Napoleon Bhagath Singh	No	Yes		
2022	Heaven	No	Yes	Adv. Damodhara Shenoy	
2022	Shefeekkinte Santhosham	No	Yes		
2022	Roy	No	Yes		
2023	2018	No	Yes	Police Officer	
2023	Voice of Sathyanathan	No	Yes	Saghavu Anirudhan	
2023	Imbam	No	Yes	Hareesh	
2025	Machante Maalakha	Yes	No	—	
