= Lavasa (disambiguation) =

Lavasa can refer to:

- Lavasa, private, planned city in the state of Maharashtra in India built near Pune
- Lavasa Women's Drive, annual rally and charity event held in Lavasa
- Ashok Lavasa, retired Indian civil servant
