= Sabbah Haji =

Dubai school director

- Born: 1982 (age 43–44); Dubai, UAE
- Education: The Indian High School, Dubai; Bishop Cotton Girls' School; Christ College, Bengaluru (B.Com)
- Occupations: Director/Teacher at Haji Public School (2009-2021); Managing Editor/Content Writer in plaNETsurf Creation Pvt Ltd (2008); Content Writer/Copy Editor in Digital Media Convergence Ltd (2007-08); Team Lead (English Support Services) in Deluxe Digital Studios (2005-07); Staff Accountant (Audit Trainee) in KPMG, Bangalore (2003-04)
- Known for: Haji Public School
- Parent(s): Mohammed Saleem Haji and Tasneem Akhtar Malik
- Awards: L'oreal Paris Femina Award 2013 for Education; ICICI Bank Advantage Woman Award, 2018; State Award for Social Reforms and Empowerment, 2017; Jijabai Women Achievers’ Award, 2014 – Education; Lavasa Women's Drive Awards – Education, 2013; L'Oreal Paris Femina Women Awards 2013 – Education, 2013; CNN-IBN Real Heroes Award 2012

Sabbah Haji is the former director of Haji Public School, a not-for-profit school established in 2009 by her family in their ancestral village in the Doda district of Jammu and Kashmir, India. Sabbah was born in Dubai in 1982 where her father, Saleem Haji, was a manager in a shipping company. Sabbah's family is from Breswana village of Doda, Jammu and Kashmir. Her family shifted to Dubai in early 1980s and then to Bangalore in 1997. She finally returned to her native village, Breswana, to run the Haji Public School with her family, with the school being the main focus of her life, till she quit in November 2021.

== Family ==
Sabbah Haji was born and raised in Dubai. Her father is from Breswana village of Doda in Jammu and Kashmir. Her father, Saleem Haji, spent a good part of his childhood and youth farming in the village. He graduated from Jammu University, then worked for over two decades in Dubai, UAE in management roles in shipping companies. On his return to the village in Jammu and Kashmir in the early 2000s, he immediately fell back into the pattern of the earlier and has since become a bedrock of the village in general and the school in particular. He is now the chief advisor for Haji Public School, and elected sarpanch (village headman) of Breswana.

Haji's mother, Tasneem Akhtar Malik, has been the Principal of Haji Public School since its inception in 2009. She has over 30 years' experience in teaching and school administration, having taught at various schools from her college days till the present. Tasneem Haji nee Malik who originally hails from the Kishtwar town of Jammu Kashmir completed her Bachelor of Arts from Kashmir University, and subsequently received her Bachelor of Education while teaching in Dubai, UAE.

Sabbah's uncle, Nasir Haji, is the driving force and primary funder of the entire project from its inception to date. He is a philanthropist-businessman based in Singapore. He grew up in Jammu and Kashmir before moving to Dubai and working himself up to run and partner in several successful businesses in Dubai, Jakarta and subsequently Singapore. It was Nasir Haji's vision of bringing about long-lasting change through education in his ancestral village that gave birth to the idea for Haji Public School in 2008. Nasir Haji has also founded the Haji Amina Charity Trust in Doda in 2005. The Trust provides financial, medical and educational aid to a large number of people in the Doda region.

== Education and career ==
Haji finished her 10th grade from The Indian High School, Dubai. She then shifted to Bengaluru in 1997, from where Haji completed her 12th grade from Bishop Cotton Girls' School Bengaluru. She completed her Bachelors in Commerce from Christ College, Bengaluru in 2002.

Sabbah was staff accountant (audit trainee) at KPMG, Bangalore (2003-2004); team lead (English support services) in Deluxe Digital Studios (2005-2007); content writer/copy editor in Digital Media Convergence Ltd (2007-2008); managing editor/content writer in Planetsurf Creation Pvt Ltd (2008).

In 2008, the Amarnath struggle of Jammu and Kashmir broke out. Haji's mother, Tasneem Haji witnessed her hometown, Kishtwar, being severely affected during the struggle. It was then that Sabbah Haji, who was in Bengaluru, quit her city life to return to her family in Jammu and Kashmir.

== Haji Public School ==
After Haji returned to her native village Breswana in 2008, she saw that nearly two generations of villagers had no education, due to the apathetic attitude of successive governments and militancy. She then thought of opening a school to give education to children there. After taking suggestions from her family, she started Haji Public School in 2009 in Breswana.

Since it started on 4 May 2009, the Haji Public School has just one objective – to impart knowledge to those children who cannot avail of the academic facilities being provided to others, in more accessible cities. The cause was so strong that the village inhabitants helped build the school brick by brick. The villagers have brought up materials for the school on their backs. They wrote a petition which allowed the Haji family to start a school. Over the winter of 2008, Haji and her mother, Tasneem Haji, trained two boys from the village in order to turn them into teachers. With no building to call their own initially, they worked out of two rooms in their ancestral house itself. They started at the ground level, teaching only the lower and upper kindergarten students. With Sabbah's strong and disciplined work ethic from Bengaluru and Tasneem's crucial 30 years’ worth teaching and school administration experience, they began the Haji Public School as an elementary school with about 25 kids. Today, the K-10 school caters to over 400 students from nearby villages, with even city dwellers moving to Breswana seeking admission to the not-for-profit, low cost institute.

Haji Public School was initially set up under the Haji Amina Charity Trust in Doda founded by Mr Nasir Haji. It now functions under the Haji Education Foundation, a separate organization set up in 2011 specifically to promote education in the region. The Haji Education Foundation trustees are Mohd Saleem Haji, Tasneem Haji and Sabbah Haji. The Foundation takes its direction from Mr Nasir Haji.

Sabbah raises funds through social media sites and invites volunteers to teach at her school that has seen no drop-outs in the past five years. The volunteers, who live among the villagers, teach for a period of three months. They spend time with students and make their efforts to erase negative impressions of outsiders through their selfless efforts, hard work, and dedication. The volunteers are not paid, but they are provided with food and lodging. The first long term volunteers were two young men, Felix and Azon, who stayed over three months each. Azon subsequently joined Haji Public School as a permanent member and was Deputy Director of School Operations for three years. Till December 2016, Haji Public School has had over 62 teaching volunteers from Canada, Singapore, the US, South Africa, France and India. Several of them have returned for multiple long-term stints with Haji Public School since they find themselves invested in and attached to the students and the work to be genuinely satisfying.

== TED Events ==
Haji has represented her school at various TED events. In 2014 she attended TEDx event at BITS Pilani Goa and in 2015 at Symbiosis International University, Lavale, Pune. She has also co-organized a TEDx event in Srinagar with Raheel Khursheed in 2012.

== Arrest ==
Sabbah Haji was released on bail on Friday 17 December 2021, following her arrest for sharing an offensive social media post that called CDS Gen. Bipin Rawat a "war criminal" after he died in a helicopter crash on 8 December 2021. She spent four days in custody and apologised in writing for the post after Haji Public School was threatened with closure.

A first class executive magistrate gave Sabbah, 39, bail on a personal bond of Rs 50,000 after she submitted her written apology. The magistrate said security agencies would monitor her activities for a year.

The post on Gen. Rawat that Sabbah shared attracted widespread criticism against the not-for-profit English-medium school she and her mother founded in 2009 in her native village, accessible only after a trek of three-four hours through mountainous terrain that remains snowed out in winter. Several people called out the school and demanded its closure. The school management clarified that "a recent distasteful media post during the rounds has nothing to do with the school and that the said person has acted in their individual capacity after their tenure with the school ended". Sabbah Haji had completed her notice period with the school at the end of November 2021 just before this incident occurred. Her father Saleem Haji said: "We are in the process of looking for a new director for the school." He defended Sabbah, saying all "children make mistakes and she has repented for hers. She had shared the post, not made such remarks herself". However, sharing objectionable social media posts is equally damaging though whether or not punishable under law requires legal scrutiny.

== Awards ==
- ICICI Bank Advantage Woman Award, 2018
- J&K State Award for Social Reforms and Empowerment, 2017
- Jijabai Women Achievers’ Award, 2014 – Education
- Lavasa Women’s Drive Awards – Education, 2013
- L'oreal Paris Femina Award 2013 for Education
- CNN-IBN Real Heroes Award 2012

== See also ==
- Breswana
