= Breswana =

Breswana Breswunni
- Village
- Breswana (Doda, Jammu and Kashmir) Breswana (India)
- Coordinates: 33°11′17″N 75°42′32″E
- Country: India
- Union Territory: Jammu and Kashmir
- Region: Saraz
- District: Doda
- Tehsil: Mahalla
- Founded: early 1900
- Elevation: 2,300 m (7,500 ft)
- PIN: 182201
- Languages: Kashmiri, Urdu Sarazi

Breswana is a remote Himalayan village in the Doda district of the Jammu division of Jammu and Kashmir, India. The village is located 7,500 feet (2,300 m) above sea level. Breswana village is accessed via trails from Premnagar, the closest town. Kashmiri is the main language of the area. People also use Urdu as a secondary language.

== Geography ==
It is located in Saraz region and is about 3 kilometres (1.9 miles) away from the last motorable point, at the wooden bridge over the river Chenab in the town of Premnagar, which is about 15 kilometres (9.3 miles) from Doda. Now road bridge three Kilometers from Premnagar (Doda district) built near Sheva Dal village which shortened it's traveling time. There are three legs of the journey from city to village:

- Jammu to Doda: 183 km by road
- Doda to Premnagar: 15 km by road
- Premnagar to Breswana: 7 km on foot or horseback.

=== Alternate Road ===
- Sheva Dal to Brewana: After reaching Premnagar, there is Sheva Dal three km by road towards east from Premnagar. The Sheva Dal Bridge or Sheva Pull is now a working bridge which connects National Highway 244 with Mahalla tehsil of Doda district.

== Education ==
- Haji Public School

== See also ==
- Sabbah Haji
- Haji Public School
