= Hasya Kala Drama Group =

Theater group in Dubai, UAE

- Address: Dubai; United Arab Emirates
- Owner: Narendra Sadhwani
- Type: Hindi and Sindhi Suspense Comedy

Construction
- Opened: October 21, 1992
- Years active: 1992 - Present

Website
- www.hasyakala.com

Hasya Kala Drama Group is a Hindi and Sindhi language theater group that is based in Dubai, United Arab Emirates. It was started by play writer, director and producer, Narendra Sadhwani with the idea of promoting amateurs and motivating local talent to exhibit their acting skills. 'Hasya' is a Sanskrit word for 'laughter' and 'Kala' means 'art' in Hindi.

Since its inception on October 21, 1992, the group has entertained its audience with a genre of suspense comedy and has successfully staged 21 well received dramas at various locations in Dubai.

The group has more than 80 members, including actors, on and off-stage coordinators and volunteers. Mrs. Geeta Sadhwani plays a vital role in managing the group and oversees its rehearsal activities.

== Promoting the Sindhi Language ==
In 2002, the group staged its first full-length Sindhi drama. By 2006, four Sindhi dramas were staged. This was highly appraised by the Sindhi Ceremonial Center, Dubai, which presented shields to all the artists on 23 April 2006 for their memorable performance and hard work in the third sindhi drama, Hiku Ajeebu Khel BLACKMAIL. The center also honored the writer, director, producer and founder of the group by presenting him with a Certificate towards his contribution in promoting the “Sindhi” language and also working for the cause of Sindhi community.

== Celebrating 25 years ==
The group celebrated its twenty five years of success on October 21, 2017.

== List of Dramas ==
=== Hindi Dramas ===
Drama	Date	Venue
Dil Ki Chot Pyaar Ka Vote	6th Dec 1992	Astoria Hotel, Dubai
Viraasat Mein Hiraasat	14th Feb 1993	Astoria Hotel, Dubai
Laila Ki Daud... Majnu Ki Oar	9 May 1993	Astoria Hotel, Dubai
Ek Ajeeb Khel... Blackmail	21st Nov 1993	Astoria Hotel, Dubai
Viraasat Mein Hiraasat	16 April 1994	Astoria Hotel, Dubai
Seedhe Raaste Tedhi Chaal	27th Dec 1994	Astoria Hotel, Dubai
Seedhe Raaste Tedhi Chaal	13th Mar 2009	Sheikh Rashid Auditorium, The Indian High School, Dubai
Aish Without... Cash	27 May 2010	Sheikh Rashid Auditorium, The Indian High School, Dubai

=== Sindhi Dramas ===
Drama	Date	Venue
Manju Ta Manju... Na Ta Ta Vanju	2nd Dec 2002	Emirates Theater, Dubai
Virasaata Mein Hirasaata	6 May 2005	Crowne Plaza Hotel, Dubai
Hiku Ajeebu Khel BLACKMAIL	14th Apr 2006	Crowne Plaza Hotel, Dubai
Dill Ji Chot... Pyaarra Jo Vote	22nd Dec 2006	Centerpoint Theater, Mall of the Emirates, Dubai

=== Fusion Dramas ===
Drama	Date	Venue
Majboori Ki Maar... Ker Kare Inkaar	25th Dec 2015	Sheikh Rashid Auditorium, The Indian High School, Dubai
