= Mahomet, Texas =

- Unincorporated community
- Location within Texas Location within the United States
- Coordinates: 30°49′19″N 97°55′55″W
- Country: United States
- State: Texas
- County: Burnet
- Elevation: 1,037 ft (316 m)
- Time zone: UTC-6 (Central (CST))
  - Summer (DST): UTC-5 (CDT)
- Area codes: 512 & 737
- GNIS feature ID: 1380132

Mahomet is an unincorporated community in Burnet County, Texas, United States. According to the Handbook of Texas, the community had an estimated population of 47 in 2000.

== Geography ==
Mahomet is located on Farm to Market Road 243 near Bear Creek, 15 mi (24 km) northeast of Bertram in eastern Burnet County.

== Education ==
Mahomet had its own school in 1884. Today, Mahomet is served by the Burnet Consolidated Independent School District.
