= List of highways numbered 243 =

The following highways are numbered 243:

== Canada ==
- Manitoba Provincial Road 243
- Prince Edward Island Route 243
- Quebec Route 243

== Costa Rica ==
- National Route 243

== Japan ==
- Japan National Route 243

== United Kingdom ==
- A243 road
- B243 road

== United States ==
- Alabama State Route 243
- Arkansas Highway 243
- California State Route 243
- Connecticut Route 243
- Florida State Road 243
- Georgia State Route 243
- Indiana State Road 243
- Iowa Highway 243 (former)
- K-243 (Kansas highway)
- Kentucky Route 243
- Maryland Route 243
- Minnesota State Highway 243
- Montana Secondary Highway 243
- New Mexico State Road 243
- New York State Route 243
- Ohio State Route 243
- Pennsylvania Route 243 (former)
- South Carolina Highway 243
- Tennessee State Route 243
- Texas State Highway 243
  - Farm to Market Road 243 (former)
  - Ranch to Market Road 243
- Utah State Route 243
- Vermont Route 243
- Virginia State Route 243
- Washington State Route 243
- Wisconsin Highway 243

== See also ==
- List of highways numbered 242
- List of highways numbered 244

Preceded by 242	Lists of highways 243	Succeeded by 244
