= List of highways numbered 246 =

The following highways are numbered 246:

== Canada ==
- Nova Scotia Route 246
- Prince Edward Island Route 246

== Costa Rica ==
- National Route 246

== Japan ==
- Japan National Route 246

== United Kingdom ==
- A246 road

== United States ==
- Arkansas Highway 246
- California State Route 246
- Georgia State Route 246
- Indiana State Road 246
- K-246 (Kansas highway)
- Kentucky Route 246
- Maryland Route 246
- Minnesota State Highway 246
- Missouri Route 246
- Montana Secondary Highway 246
- New Mexico State Road 246
- New York State Route 246
- Ohio State Route 246
- Pennsylvania Route 246
- Rhode Island Route 246
- South Carolina Highway 246
- Tennessee State Route 246
- Texas State Highway 246 (former)
  - Texas State Highway Spur 246
  - Farm to Market Road 246 (Texas)
- Utah State Route 246 (former)
- Virginia State Route 246

Preceded by 245	Lists of highways 246	Succeeded by 247
