= Maghanmal Pancholia =

Indian-Emirati businessman and trader (1924–2019)

- Born: Maghanmal Jethanand Pancholia; 24 October 1924; British India (in modern-day India)
- Died: 2 September 2019 (aged 94); Bur Dubai, UAE
- Citizenship: Indian
- Occupations: Businessman; Trader; Philanthropist

Maghanmal Jethanand Pancholia (24 October 1924 – 2 September 2019), also known as Maghaba, was an Indian-Emirati businessman, trader, philanthropist and the founder of the Indian High School, Dubai, first Indian educational institution established in the UAE. He was one of the four businessmen to introduce electricity to Dubai, and the first Indian citizen to be appointed as board member of Dubai Chamber of Commerce and Industry by Rashid bin Saeed Al Maktoum.

He served director of Dubai Electric Company (now merged to Dubai Electricity and Water Authority) from 1961 to 1980 and the board member of Al Maktoum Hospital, originally appointed by the British Political Agent.

== Biography ==
He was born on 24 October 1924 in India and belonged to the Thattai Bhatia Sindhi community. He married Kalabai Maghanmal Pancholia (1927–2018) in 1943, with whom he had four children. He reached to Sharjah in 1942 via Karachi route and started trading pearls and gold. He was also involved in grocery stores and currency exchange businesses until he started textiles, electronics and wholesale food alongside financing pearl industry.

In 1957, he established an electricity corporation in Dubai which continued power distribution to the general public till 1960. He wrote an autobiography titled Footprints: Memoirs of an Indian Patriarch that covers his life and the development history of Dubai.

== Death ==
He was 20th century's one of the oldest Indian-Emirate citizens. He died on 2 September 2019 in Dubai, and was cremated on 3 September in Jebel Ali. He worked till the last day of his life.

== Books ==
- Pancholia, Maghanmal J. (2009). Footprints: Memoirs of an Indian Patriarch. Motivate Pub. ISBN 9781860632655.
