= List of highways numbered 248 =

The following highways are numbered 248:

== Canada ==
- Manitoba Provincial Road 248
- Prince Edward Island Route 248
- Quebec Route 248

== Costa Rica ==
- National Route 248

== India ==
- National Highway 248 (India)

== Japan ==
- Japan National Route 248

== United Kingdom ==
- A248 road
- B248 road

== United States ==
- Alabama State Route 248
- Arkansas Highway 248
- California State Route 248
- Georgia State Route 248 (former)
- K-248 (Kansas highway)
- Kentucky Route 248
- Minnesota State Highway 248
- Missouri Route 248
- Montana Secondary Highway 248
- New York State Route 248
  - New York State Route 248A
- Ohio State Route 248
- Pennsylvania Route 248
- South Carolina Highway 248
- South Dakota Highway 248
- Tennessee State Route 248
- Texas State Highway 248 (former)
  - Texas State Highway Spur 248
  - Farm to Market Road 248 (Texas)
- Utah State Route 248

Preceded by 247	Lists of highways 248	Succeeded by 249
