= Haji Public School =

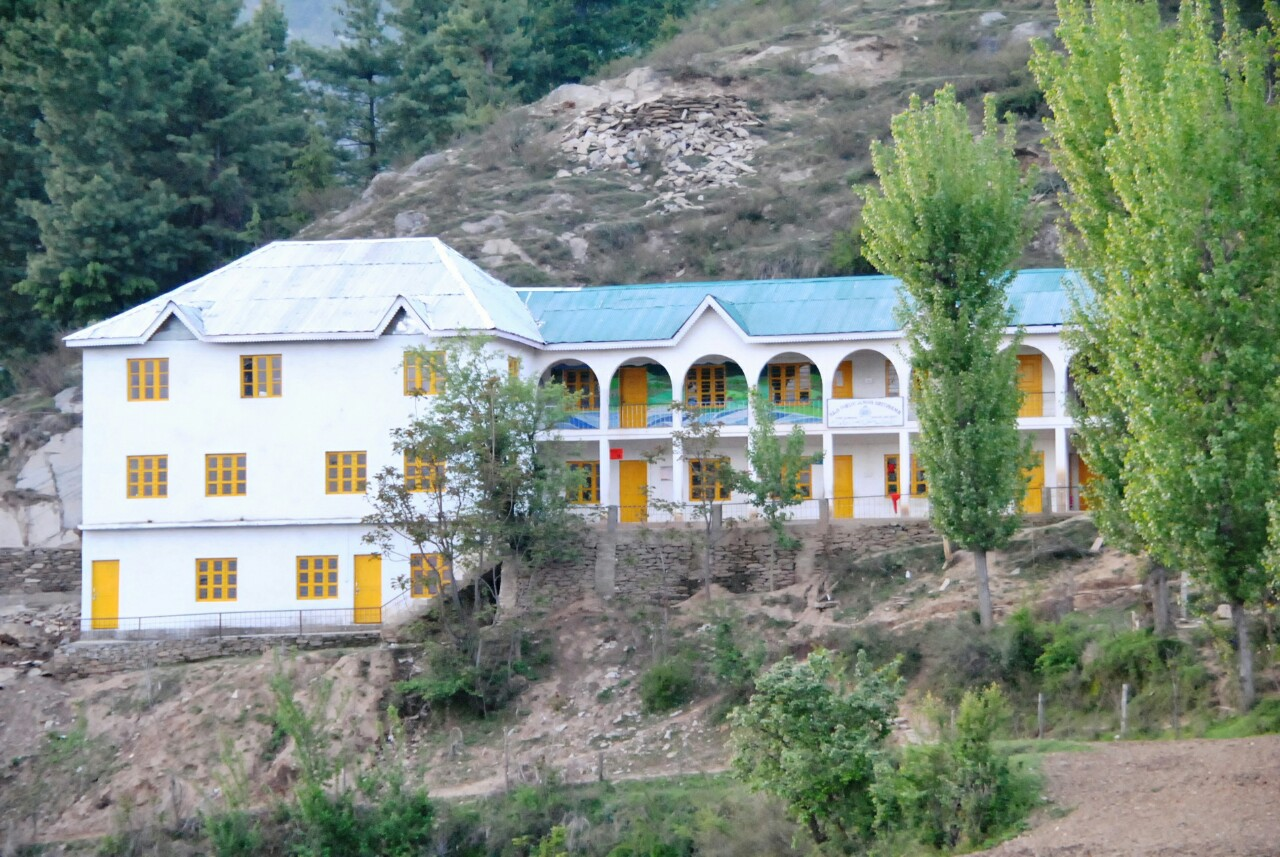
- Haji Public School, 2016

Location
- Breswana; Doda; Jammu and Kashmir, 182201; India; 33°11′23″N 75°42′31″E

Information
- School type: Voluntary
- Motto: Terras Irradient (Let Them Illumine the Earth)
- Established: 4 May 2009; 17 years ago
- Founder: Mr Nasir Haji
- School board: Jammu and Kashmir State Board of School Education
- School district: Doda
- Category: School
- Principal: Tasneem Akhtar Malik
- Headmistress: Rahida Attu
- Teaching staff: 20
- Gender: Co-education
- Enrolment: 419 (2022)
- Language: English
- Hours in school day: 9 a.m. to 3 p.m.
- Campus type: Rural
- Houses: GONDOR, Moria, Rivendell, Rohan
- Color
- Sports: Basketball, Cricket, Badminton, Football, Table Tennis, Wall Climbing
- Motto: Terras Irradient - Let Them Illumine the Earth
- Mission: "To make education accessible to the inaccessible"
- Focus: "To provide good quality education in the village."
- Last updated: 28 December 2016

Haji Public School is a non-profit educational institution established in 2009 by the Haji family in Breswana, their ancestral village located in the Doda district of Jammu and Kashmir, Northern India.

The school primarily serves low-income farming families, constituting the majority of the local population. It is registered as a K-10 institute and is affiliated with the Jammu and Kashmir State Board of School Education (JKBOSE).

Located in a rural setting, the school caters to children from surrounding mountain villages. Funding for the school is sourced privately through contributions from the Haji family, their associates, and online donations.

== History ==
In 2008, Sabbah Haji moved back from Bengaluru to her native village Breswana. There, she saw that nearly two generations of villagers had no education due to inaction by the government and militancy. At an elevation of over 7,500 feet, with no motor access to the rest of the state, this mountain region's education had languished in the past few decades. Although government schools existed in the area, Sabbah dismissed them as inefficient, lacking faculties, teachers and turning out 'degree students who could not read'. Her family aimed to provide these children with an education that would allow them to compete as equals with the rest of the world. Afterwards, the Haji Public School was born in 2009.

The school was built on land donated by her family and was initially set up under the 'Haji Amina Charity Trust' in Doda, founded by Mr Nasir Haji. It currently functions under the 'Haji Education Foundation', a separate organization set up in 2011 which promotes education in the region. The Haji Education Foundation trustees are Mohd Saleem Haji, Tasneem Haji, and Sabbah Haji. The Trust is also funded by donations from various members of the family and friends.

Since its beginning on May 4, 2009, the Haji Public School has aimed – "to impart knowledge to those children who cannot avail themselves of the academic facilities being provided to others, in more accessible cities". The village inhabitants petitioned to support the Haji family in starting and building a school. Over the winter of 2008, Sabbah Haji and her mother, Tasneem Haji, trained two boys from the village in order to turn them into teachers. With no initial construction, they worked out of two rooms in their ancestral house. They started at the ground level, teaching only the lower and upper kindergarten students. The first class at the Haji Public School comprised 25 kids.

The school now has its own building, and it is growing every year. As of December 2016, the school has over 350 students. The school has expanded its branches further in nearest villages such as Persholla and Shadiwan.

== Location ==
Haji Public School is located in the village Breswana, of Doda district in Jammu and Kashmir.

== Volunteers ==
Due to lack of qualified teachers in and around the village, the proper volunteer program was started in year 2012. Apart from the few regular teaching staff, the school relies heavily on the volunteers coming in from all around the world. The local staff members are only capable of teaching until the second grade. Until December 2016, Haji Public School has had over 62 teaching volunteers from Canada, Singapore, the US, South Africa, France and India. Several of them have returned for multiple long-term stints with Haji Public School.

== Facilities and fees ==
The campus includes a basketball court, computer lab, library, playground, and wall climbing area. The school charges a monthly tuition. Its books and paper supplies are funded by the Amin Trust.
