= Arushee Wahi =

Indian swimmer

Sport
- Sport: Swimming
- Strokes: Butterfly

Arushee Wahi is an Indian swimmer based in Dubai, United Arab Emirates. She is a three-time winner of The Sheikh Hamdan Award for distinguished performance (2007, 2010 and 2013) as well as winner of the Sharjah Award. Wahi has won the Chacha Nehru scholarship for sports on a number of occasions. In 2012 she was the Uttar Pradesh state champion and CBSE national champion in India.

== Early life and education ==
Wahi began swimming at the age of three. She attended the Delhi Private School in Sharjah from 2000 to 2011, and won a medal for excellence in mathematics. In 2012 she attended the Indian High School in Dubai. Currently, she resides in Bengaluru and is pursuing a Ph.D. in Clinical Psychology.

== Swimming career ==
Wahi won three gold medals at the CBSE National Swimming Championship in Vadodara, India in 2008, when she was in Grade Six. With a collection of over 200 medals and 20 trophies, she broke many records in swimming in the Indian Nationals.

Wahi participates in charity events and pro-environment campaigns. She ranked 9th in 50m butterfly in the FINA World Short Course Swimming Championships in Dubai 2013. In 2013 she continued to set new records and earn gold medals in the U19 category at the CBSE Gulf Cluster meet and the 4th Aquatic Championship.

In 2013 Wahi resided in Dubai with her parents and her brother.

In 2014 she was named best swimmer at the Uttar Pradesh State Championships in Lucknow.
