= Ranch to Market Road 243 =

Ranch to Market road in Texas, United States

Ranch to Market Road 243

Route information
- Maintained by TxDOT
- Length: 20.484 mi (32.966 km)
- Existed: 1945–present

Major junctions
- West end: RM 1174 near Oatmeal
- SH 29 at Bertram
- East end: US 183 near Mahomet

Location
- Country: United States
- State: Texas
- Counties: Burnet, Williamson

Highway system
- Highways in Texas; Interstate; US; State; Former; Toll; Loops; Spurs; FM/RM; Park; Rec
← FM 242	→ FM 244

Ranch to Market Road 243 (RM 243) is a Ranch to Market Road in the U.S. state of Texas maintained by the Texas Department of Transportation (TxDOT). The road, first designated in 1945, is located in Burnet and Williamson counties in the Texas Hill Country and passes through the city of Bertram and the smaller communities of Oatmeal and Mahomet. The nearly 21-mile (34 km) road has major intersections with RM 1174 and US 183 at its termini and has short concurrencies with SH 29 and again with RM 1174 in Bertram. RM 243 passes through a portion of a national wildlife refuge and crosses two forks of the San Gabriel River.

== History ==
RM 243 was originally designated on June 11, 1945, as Farm to Market Road 243 (FM 243), a 13.8-mile (22.2 km) from SH 29 in Bertram to a location TxDOT identifies as Green's Corner at the road's eastern terminus on what was then SH 74. On July 14, 1949, the road was extended 5.7 miles (9.2 km) to Oatmeal. US 183 was rerouted eastward south of Albany along a new route that includes the present section between Briggs and Austin at the Green's Corner terminus. On October 31, 1957, RM 243 received its current Ranch to Market designation and was extended 2.6 miles (4.2 km) to RM 1174, which was extended southward from Bertram at the same time.

== Route description ==
RM 243 begins at RM 1174 in Balcones Canyonlands National Wildlife Refuge in Burnet County. The road proceeds northward passing through Oatmeal before crossing the South Fork of the San Gabriel River, then turns to the northeast toward Bertram. In Bertram, RM 243 joins SH 29 to the southeast until turning back to the northeast along N. Grave St. joining RM 1174. On the north edge of town, RM 1174 separates to the north, then RM 243 leaves town to the northeast and crosses the North Fork of the San Gabriel River. The road then passes through Mahomet before it terminates immediately after crossing into Williamson County at US 183 between Liberty Hill and Biggs.

== Major intersections ==
County	Location	mi	km	Destinations	Notes
Burnet		0	0.0	RM 1174 – Bertram	Western terminus at Balcones Canyonlands National Wildlife Refuge
Burnet	Bertram	7.9	12.7	SH 29 west – Burnet	Begin overlay of SH 29
Burnet	Bertram	8.0	12.9	SH 29 east / RM 1174 south (N. Grange St.) – Liberty Hill	End overlay of SH 29, begin overlay of RM 1174
Burnet	Bertram	8.5	13.7	RM 1174 north (N. Main St.)	End overlay of RM 1174
Williamson		20.7	33.3	US 183 – Austin, Briggs	Eastern terminus
1.000 mi = 1.609 km; 1.000 km = 0.621 mi
