= Oatmeal, Texas =

Unincorporated community in Burnet County, Texas, United States

- Unincorporated community
- Location within Texas Location within the United States
- Coordinates: 30°41′49″N 98°05′40″W
- Country: United States
- State: Texas
- County: Burnet
- Elevation: 1,234 ft (376 m)
- Time zone: UTC-6 (Central (CST))
  - Summer (DST): UTC-5 (CDT)
- Area codes: 512 & 737
- GNIS feature ID: 1380281

Oatmeal is an unincorporated community in Burnet County, Texas, United States. Its population was 20 in 2000.

== History ==
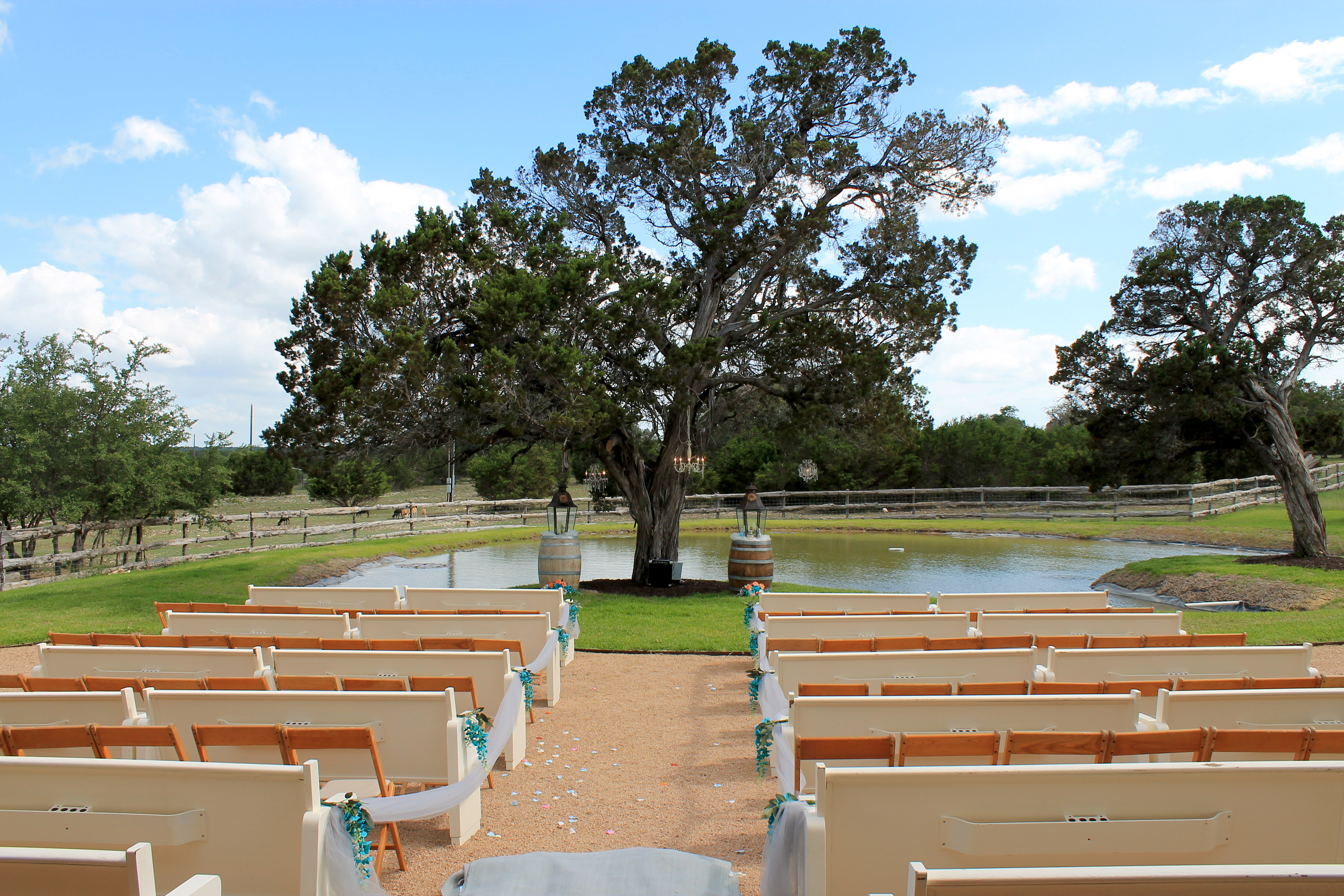
Twisted Ranch in Oatmeal (2014)

The area's first settlers were German families during the late 1840s, who lived on Oatmeal Creek. The community's name is either an alteration of a Mr. Othneil, the area's first gristmill owner, or a supposed translation of the name Habermill (Haber being a German dialect word for Hafer, "oats"). A post office was established in 1853 under the name Oatmeal. The community had the first orchard in Burnet County and a cheese-pressing station operated here. A gin built in the 1870s continued to serve as a local landmark into the early 1900s. It also had a general store at one time. A cemetery was deeded in 1871, although burials were recorded in the area as early as 1854. In 1936, Oatmeal had two churches and scattered dwellings. By 1990, the population was around 20, consisting mostly of families engaged in farming and ranching. It also had a church, a community center, and a cemetery during that time. That figure remained the same in 2000.

=== Stringtown ===
Following the Civil War, a colony of freedmen, freed slaves, settled in the eastern part of Oatmeal. The settlement, known as Stringtown, included homes, a building used as a church and school, and Burnet County's only all-black cemetery. The community of Stringtown remained in existence until the early 1920s.

== Culture ==
Oatmeal's water tower is painted to resemble a box of oatmeal.

Since 1978, the community of Oatmeal and the nearby city of Bertram have celebrated an annual Oatmeal Festival, originally a parody of chili cookoffs. Ken Odiorne, a local resident, started the tradition by writing to the major producers of oatmeal at the time to ask for assistance. Only one company, National Oats, responded.

The Oatmeal Festival has played a significant role in the continued notoriety and existence of Oatmeal, Burnet County's second-oldest community.

== Geography ==
Oatmeal is situated along Ranch to Market Road 243, about 8 miles southeast of Burnet and 56 miles (90 km) northwest of Austin.

=== Climate ===
The climate in this area is characterized by hot, humid summers and generally mild to cool winters. According to the Köppen climate classification, Oatmeal has a humid subtropical climate, Cfa on climate maps.

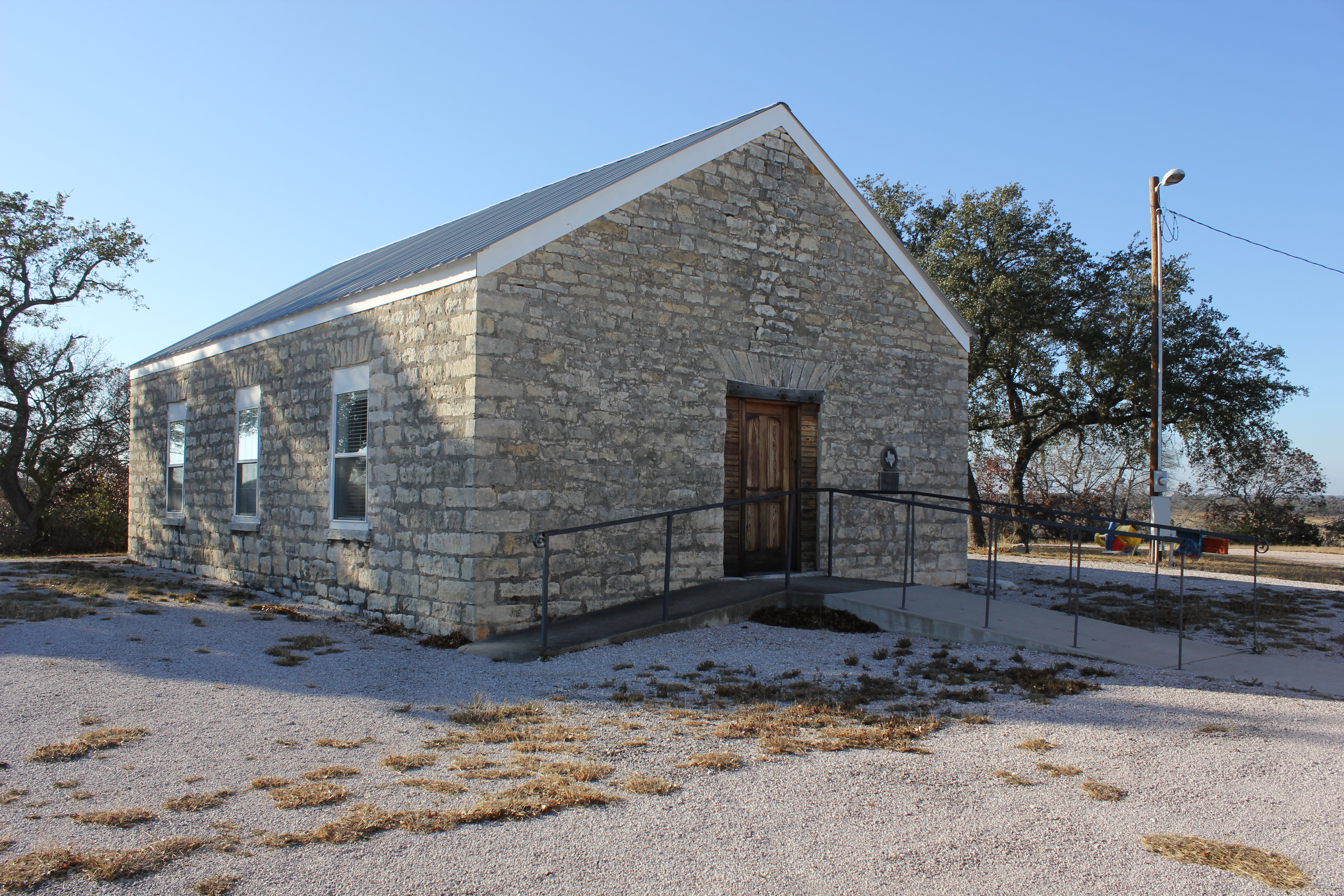
Former Oatmeal School built in 1869

== Education ==
The first schoolhouse opened in 1858, only to be replaced by a second building 11 years later. In 1936, Oatmeal's school continued to operate. Today, the community is served by the Burnet Consolidated Independent School District.
