= List of highways numbered 250 =

Route 250, or Highway 250, may refer to:

== Canada ==
- Manitoba Provincial Road 250
- Prince Edward Island Route 250

== Costa Rica ==
- National Route 250

== Japan ==
- Japan National Route 250

== United Kingdom ==
- A250 road
- B250 road

== United States ==
- U.S. Route 250
- Arkansas Highway 250
- California State Route 250
- Georgia State Route 250 (former)
- Hawaii Route 250
- Illinois Route 250
- Indiana State Road 250
- Kentucky Route 250
- Minnesota State Highway 250
- Montana Secondary Highway 250
- Nebraska Highway 250
- New Mexico State Road 250
- New York State Route 250
- Oregon Route 250
- Pennsylvania Route 250 (former)
- Tennessee State Route 250
- Texas State Highway 250 (former)
- Texas State Highway Loop 250
- Farm to Market Road 250 (Texas)
- Utah State Route 250 (former)

Territories:

- Puerto Rico Highway 250

Preceded by 249	Lists of highways 250	Succeeded by 251
