= List of highways numbered 242 =

The following highways are numbered 242:

== Canada ==
- Manitoba Provincial Road 242
- Nova Scotia Route 242
- Prince Edward Island Route 242

== Costa Rica ==
- National Route 242

== Cuba ==
- Puerta de Golpe–Alonso Rojas Road (1–242)

== Germany ==
- Bundesstraße 242

== Greece ==
- A242 expressway, a short spur of the A24 towards Thessaloniki Airport

== Japan ==
- Japan National Route 242

== United Kingdom ==
- A242 road
- B242 road

== United States ==
- Arkansas Highway 242
- California State Route 242
- Georgia State Route 242
- Illinois Route 242
- Iowa Highway 242 (former)
- Kentucky Route 242
- Maryland Route 242
- Minnesota State Highway 242
- Missouri Route 242
- Montana Secondary Highway 242 (former)
- New York State Route 242
- North Carolina Highway 242
- Ohio State Route 242
- Oregon Route 242
- Pennsylvania Route 242 (former)
- Tennessee State Route 242
- Texas State Highway 242
  - Texas State Highway Spur 242
  - Farm to Market Road 242 (Texas)
- Utah State Route 242 (former)
- Vermont Route 242
- Virginia State Route 242

Preceded by 241	Lists of highways 242	Succeeded by 243
