= List of highways numbered 245 =

The following highways are numbered 245:

== Canada ==
- Manitoba Provincial Road 245
- Nova Scotia Route 245
- Prince Edward Island Route 245
- Quebec Route 245

== Costa Rica ==
- National Route 245

== Japan ==
- Japan National Route 245

== United Kingdom ==
- A245 road
- B245 road

== United States ==
- Alabama State Route 245
- Arkansas Highway 245
- California State Route 245
- Florida State Road 245 (former)
- Georgia State Route 245 (former)
- Indiana State Road 245
- K-245 (Kansas highway)
- Kentucky Route 245
- Maryland Route 245
- Mississippi Highway 245
- Missouri Route 245
- Montana Secondary Highway 245
- New Mexico State Road 245
- New York State Route 245
- Ohio State Route 245
- Oregon Route 245
- Pennsylvania Route 245 (former)
- South Carolina Highway 245
- South Dakota Highway 245 (former)
- Tennessee State Route 245
- Texas State Highway 245 (former)
  - Texas State Highway Spur 245
  - Farm to Market Road 245 (Texas)
- Utah State Route 245 (former)
- Virginia State Route 245

== See also ==
- List of highways numbered 246
- List of highways numbered 244

Preceded by 244	Lists of highways 245	Succeeded by 246
