= List of highways numbered 249 =

The following highways are numbered 249:

== Canada ==
- Prince Edward Island Route 249
- Quebec Route 249

== Costa Rica ==
- National Route 249

== Japan ==
- Japan National Route 249

== United Kingdom ==
- A249 road

== United States ==
- Alabama State Route 249
- California State Route 249
- Florida State Road 249
- Georgia State Route 249 (former)
- Indiana State Road 249
- Iowa Highway 249 (former)
- K-249 (Kansas highway)
- Kentucky Route 249
- Maryland Route 249
- Minnesota State Highway 249 (former)
- Missouri Route 249
- Montana Secondary Highway 249
- New Mexico State Road 249
- New York State Route 249
- Ohio State Route 249
- Pennsylvania Route 249
- South Dakota Highway 249
- Tennessee State Route 249
- Texas State Highway 249
  - Farm to Market Road 249 (Texas)
- Utah State Route 249 (former)
- Virginia State Route 249

Preceded by 248	Lists of highways 249	Succeeded by 250
