= List of highways numbered 247 =

The following highways are numbered 247:

== Canada ==
- Manitoba Provincial Road 247
- Nova Scotia Route 247
- Prince Edward Island Route 247
- Quebec Route 247
- Saskatchewan Highway 247

== Costa Rica ==
- National Route 247

== Japan ==
- Japan National Route 247

== United Kingdom ==
- A247 road
- B247 road

== United States ==
- Alabama State Route 247
- Arkansas Highway 247
- California State Route 247
- Florida State Road 247
- Georgia State Route 247
- K-247 (Kansas highway)
- Kentucky Route 247
- Maryland Route 247
- M-247 (Michigan highway)
- Minnesota State Highway 247
- Montana Secondary Highway 247
- New Mexico State Road 247
- New York State Route 247
- Ohio State Route 247
- Pennsylvania Route 247
- South Carolina Highway 247
- South Dakota Highway 247
- Tennessee State Route 247
- Texas State Highway 247 (former)
  - Texas State Highway Spur 247
  - Farm to Market Road 247
- Utah State Route 247 (former 1969-1985)
- Utah State Route 247 (former 1953-1969)
- Virginia State Route 247

Preceded by 246	Lists of highways 247	Succeeded by 248
