= List of highways numbered 244 =

The following highways are numbered 244:

== Canada ==
- Manitoba Provincial Road 244
- Prince Edward Island Route 244

== Costa Rica ==
- National Route 244

== India ==
- National Highway 244 (India)

== Japan ==
- Japan National Route 244

== United Kingdom ==
- A244 road
- B244 road

== United States ==
- Interstate 244
- Arkansas Highway 244
- California State Route 244
- Connecticut Route 244
- Georgia State Route 244 (former)
- Indiana State Road 244
- Iowa Highway 244 (former)
- K-244 (Kansas highway)
- Kentucky Route 244
- Maryland Route 244
- Minnesota State Highway 244
- Montana Secondary Highway 244
- New Mexico State Road 244
- New York State Route 244
- Oregon Route 244
- Pennsylvania Route 244
- South Dakota Highway 244
- Tennessee State Route 244
- Texas State Highway 244 (former)
  - Texas State Highway Spur 244
  - Farm to Market Road 244 (Texas)
- Utah State Route 244 (former)
- Vermont Route 244
- Virginia State Route 244

== See also ==
- List of highways numbered 243
- List of highways numbered 245

Preceded by 243	Lists of highways 244	Succeeded by 245
