= Raheel Khursheed =

Indian journalist and business executive

- Born: 26 July 1983 (age 43); Anantnag, Kashmir, India
- Education: Symbiosis Institute of Media and Communication
- Occupations: Journalist, business executive
- Years active: 2006–present
- Employer: Laminar Global

Raheel Khursheed (born 26 July 1983) is an Indian journalist and business executive. He has worked for CNN-IBN, Times Now, and Radio Kashmir, but is most noted for being the Head of News, Politics and Government for Twitter India from 2014 to 2018. He also did a brief stint as a Country Expert for Snap Inc.'s business in India.

== Early life and education ==
Khursheed was born in Anantnag, in a remote part of Kashmir, described as a place where a national daily would reach two days past its publication date. He did his BSc from local government degree college, and further did his master's degree in communication and journalism from Symbiosis Institute of Media and Communication.

== Career ==
Khursheed's first job out of university was with CNN-IBN at their Noida office in 2006, where he wrote bylines, mostly on Indian politics and society. In 2009, he returned to Kashmir and joined Times Now's Srinagar Bureau as an editor. He hosted a western music programme for four years on Radio Kashmir. Khursheed joined Mercy Corps to help train young journalists, and Amnesty International where he learned how to do a digital campaign and used Twitter for the first time. He coordinated a petition on Change.org against the 2012 Delhi gang rape, and served as director of communications for India for the organization.

In January 2014, it was announced that Khursheed would take over as Head of News, Politics and Government for Twitter India, where he was responsible for providing technical support to news, government, and political users of Twitter, solving their problems, by escalating issues to internal support and policy teams. He was the brainchild behind creation of several technologically related products including Twitter Seva (addressing redressal of grievances), Twitter Samvad (initiative to bring digital government into masses) and SmartFeed (disaster response system).

In July 2018, Khursheed resigned from Twitter India. He then joined Snap, Inc. where he was given the title of Country Expert in India.

== Recognition ==
Khursheed's work has received recognition by several institutions around the world. In 2017, he was awarded the Knight Visiting Nieman Fellowship by Harvard University, the Yale World Fellows at Yale University. He was listed among Asia Society's 2017 class of Asia 21, a network of young leaders. In 2018, he was a Draper Hills Summer Fellow at Stanford University.

== Controversy ==
Khursheed's appointment to Twitter drew some backlash from several right wing groups for his criticism of Narendra Modi's handling of the Gujarat riots. The Hindu right wing media also accused Khursheed of political bias in verifying Twitter accounts.
