= The Indian High School, Dubai =

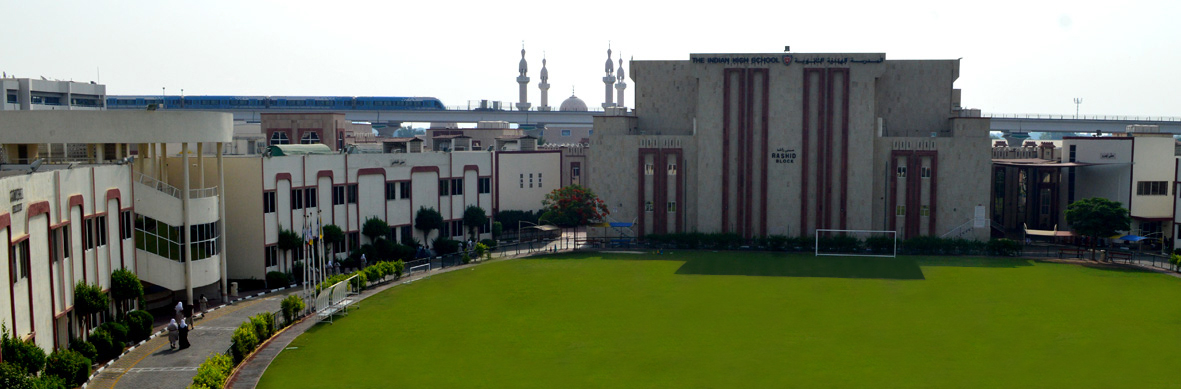

Location
- P.O. Box 106; Oud Metha; Dubai; United Arab Emirates
- Coordinates: 25°14′25.92″N 55°18′54.55″E

Information
- Motto: Knowledge is Power
- Established: 1961
- School board: Central Board of Secondary Education (CBSE)
- Director: Punit MK Vasu
- Principal: Mala Mehra
- Grades: Kindergarten to Grade 12
- Enrollment: Approximately 12203 (As of September 2017)
- Campuses: 3
- Houses: Emerald; Ruby; Sapphire; Topaz
- Website: www.ihsdubai.org
- Last updated: 15 December 2022

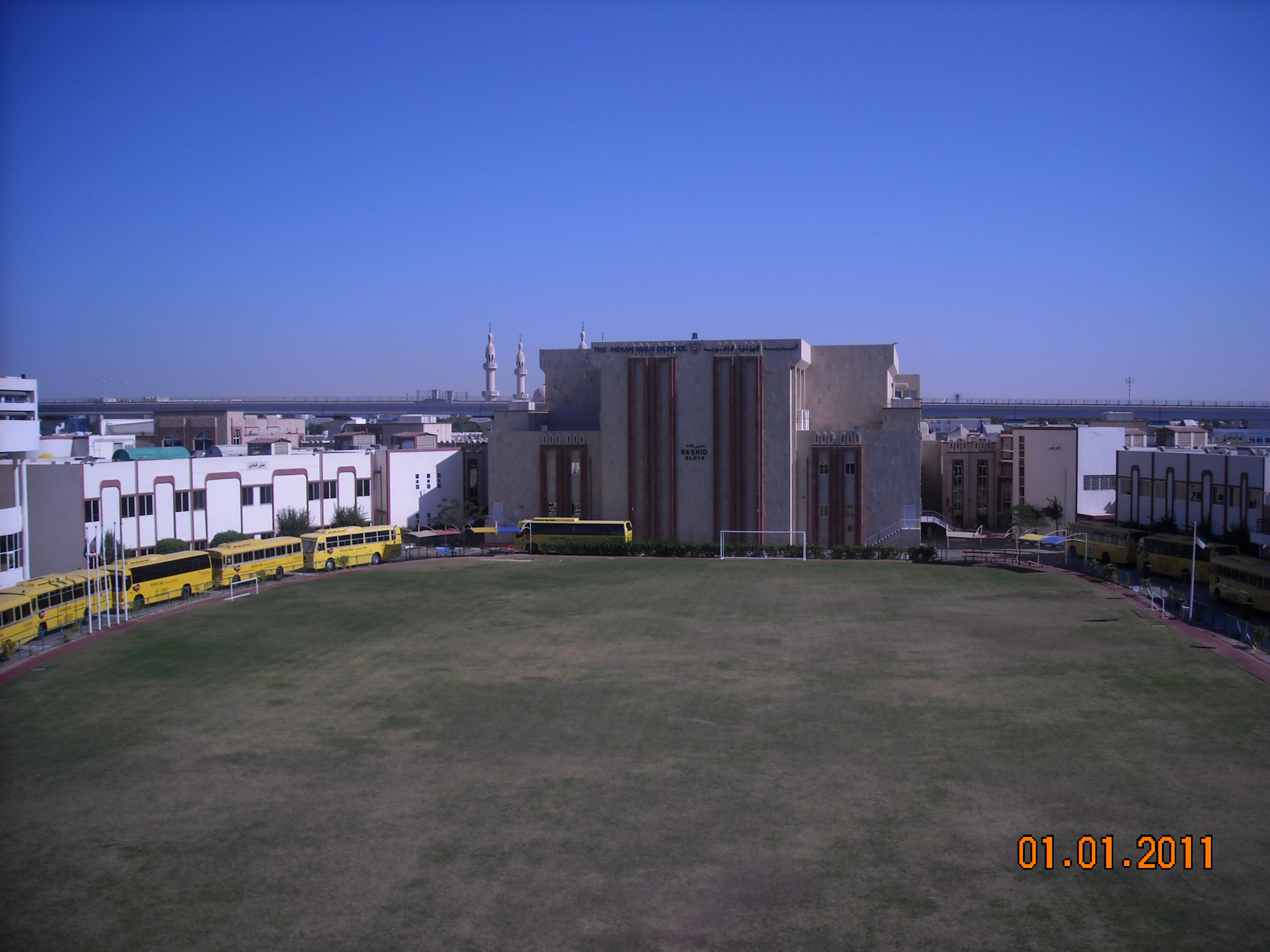
The Indian High School, Dubai(before 2016)

The Indian High School is a CBSE-affiliated Indian school in Dubai, United Arab Emirates. It was established in 1961 to provide education to the children of Indian expatriates and was the first expatriate educational institution in the UAE. The school is rated "Very Good" by Dubai's Knowledge and Human Development Authority. It is one of the oldest and largest educational institutions in the Persian Gulf region.

== History ==
The Indian High School was founded in 1961 by Maghanmal Pancholia, with the goal of providing education to the children of Indian expatriates. It was the first expatriate educational institution to be established in Dubai. The land for the school was granted by the then ruler of Dubai, Sheikh Rashid bin Saeed Al Maktoum. The initial enrollment was 8 students; it has since grown to more than 15,000 across all three campuses, including 370 students with special needs. The school has about 600 teachers.

== Location ==
The school has three campuses. The Junior School at Al Garhoud accommodates Pre-Primary classes (girls and boys KG1–Grade 4). The Senior School in Oud Metha includes girls' Grades 5 to 12, who commence in the early morning shift (7:00 am to 1:50 pm), boys' Grades 5 to 12, who commence in the late morning shift (9:10 am to 3:50 pm).

The school adopted an initiative called Rahhal ('traveller' in Arabic), which provided the senior section with a 4-day week, rather than the original 5-day week for their junior counterparts. The Grade 11 and 12 students operated in the Rahhal shift (7:00 am to 4:00 pm) on alternating days. The initiative was implemented with 3 students in 2018, and then extended to all Grade 11 and 12 students in 2019. It was later cancelled in August 2022 after numerous complaints from parents and students about long school hours that were implemented due to the new 2022 4-day weekday in UAE.

The school also operates the Indian International School (IIS DSO), located in Dubai Silicon Oasis.

The Oud Metha Metro Station on the Green Line is located near the senior school campus, and the GGICO Metro Station on the Red Line is located next to the Junior School campus. The school has a fleet of buses to transport students and staff.

A government hospital and a church are located on the road opposite the main campus, while a private hospital is located behind the junior school.

== KHDA Inspection Report ==
The Knowledge and Human Development Authority (KHDA) is Dubai's educational quality assurance authority. It oversees the quality of education across early learning centres, schools, and higher education institutions in the emirate. School inspections are conducted by the Dubai School Inspection Bureau (DSIB), a division of the KHDA. The following is a summary of DSIB inspection ratings for the Indian High School, Dubai. The school was rated "Outstanding" from 2011–12 to 2016–17, and has been rated "Very Good" from 2017–18 onward.

2009-10	2010-11	2011-12	2012-13	2013-14	2014-15	2015-16	2016-17	2017-18	2018-19	2019-20	2022-23	2023-24
Good	Good	Outstanding	Outstanding	Outstanding	Outstanding	Outstanding	Outstanding	Very Good	Very Good	Very Good	Very Good	Very Good

Full inspection reports and summary ratings for all schools in Dubai are available online through the KHDA.

== Achievements ==
The school has acquired membership of Dubai Quality Group and has acquired ISO : 9001 : 2000 Certification. It has also received the Sheikh Hamdan bin Rashid Al Maktoum Award for Distinguished School and School Administration twice, in 2002 and 2005.

The school won the eIndia 2012 awards for the No. 1 "ICT Enabled school of year" in the category of "digital learning".

== Notable alumni ==
- Manasa Radhakrishnan - Actress
- Deepak Dev - Music Composer
- Methil Devika - Classical Dance Exponent, Research Supervisor and Cultural Interpreter
- Japinder Kaur - Director
- Sabbah Haji - Educator, Social Worker
- Arushee Wahi - Swimmer
- Tanisha Crasto - Badminton Player
