= Lavasa Women's Drive =

Annual charity event

The Lavasa Women's Drive (LWD) is an annual rally and charity event held in Lavasa, near Pune, India that started in 2009. Organized by Lavasa Corporation, this rally from Pune and Mumbai and ends in Lavasa is conducted in collaboration with The Times of India and aids the Woman's Cancer Initiative of Tata Memorial Hospital in Mumbai. Held around International Women’s Day every year (early March), in addition to related activities, there's an awareness campaign about the various cancers that affect women.

== Event drive ==
Participants from all walks of life come together to show their support and to build awareness about issues related to the health and well-being of women. In 2013, many messages related to increasing crime against women were flashed. Participants expressed their outrage through the rally.

This event is celebrated around International Women’s Day every year, being a platform for woman on this matter. LWD keeps growing bigger. Every year the women’s cancer initiative of Tata Memorial Hospital offers free checkups to all LWD participants, those leading to more participants getting checked each year.

The event started in 2009, primarily to promote the hill city. It has now grown into a method by which to empowering Indian women. Its impact has also spread in the Lavasa vicinity: Cancer detections camps are conducted in nearby villages for the women who cannot afford the test otherwise. The event holds relevance because it combines fun with working for a serious cause: The rally is celebrates the spirit of participation.

== Numbers and anthem ==
In its third year, in 2011, LWD entered the Limca Book of Records as the largest women's car rally in India. This number increased by 150 per cent from 300 cars to 500 cars in 2012. All the participants have to decorate their cars around the theme using messages and pictures. Before the 2011 drive, an LWD anthem was launched to celebrate womanhood: Shibani Kashyap is its singer and lyricist.

== Celebrity and other artists' associations ==
The drive is started by celebrities in both Mumbai and Pune which then culminates in an award ceremony and dinner. In 2013, actors John Abraham and Parchi Desia flagged off about 350 cars from Lower Parel in Mumbai and the rest left from Pune. As the drive ends, the party begins in Lavasa. All participants are given a spa treatment to relax. Decorated cars displaying messages about early detection of cervical and breast cancer along with performances by various music and dance artists create a carnival-like atmosphere. Participants are also given a chance to show their talent in a separate section.

== Awards ==
The event has an awards night where the achievements of women from different areas are celebrated. The growing popularity of this rally among women led to the introduction of Women in Driving Seat Awards in 2012. Five such awards are given yearly along with those given to the first ten winning teams from Mumbai and the first five from Pune. Other awards like best message, best dressed, most popular team and the most spirited team are also presented to contestants.

Themes for the Lavasa Women's drive

Year	Theme
2009	Bombay Times March – which was held to commemorate International Women's Day.
2010	CCentennial celebrations of International Women's Day
2011	Cancer prevention through early detection was supported.
2012	Focus on prevention of cervical cancer.
2013	Focus on prevention of cervical cancer
