= Lavasa =

- Planned city Hill city
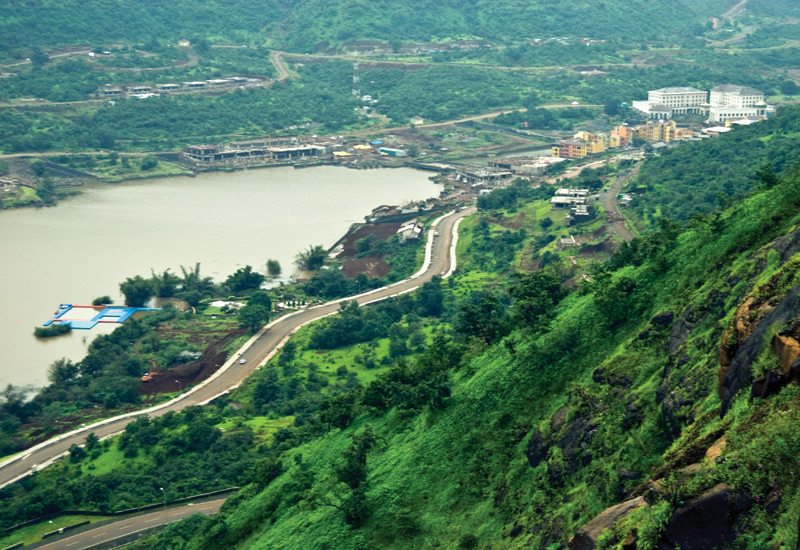
- View of Lavasa hills

- Location in Maharashtra, India
- Coordinates: 18.40528°N 73.50627°E
- Country: India
- State: Maharashtra
- District: Pune district

Area
  - Total: 100 km^{2} (39 sq mi)
- Elevation: 630 m (2,070 ft)

Languages
  - Official: Marathi
- Time zone: UTC+5:30 (IST)
- PIN: 412107
- Website: www.lavasa.com

Lavasa (Marathi: लवासा, lavāsā) is a private, planned city in the state of Maharashtra in India built near Pune. It is stylistically based on the Italian town Portofino, with a street and several buildings bearing the name of that town.

A 100-square-kilometre (39 sq mi) or 32-square-kilometre (12 sq mi) project being developed by HCC, this as-yet-incomplete city has been controversial for multiple reasons including procurement of land, harm to the environment, and loans acquired through political corruption.

In late 2010, the Indian Environment and Forests Ministry ordered that construction cease because the project violated environmental laws. In 2011, this order was rescinded. In 2023, a resolution plan was approved by the National Company Law Tribunal, with Darwin Platform Infrastructure Ltd declared as the successful bidder responsible for the city's construction. The project has been abandoned due to debt, environmental issues, and poor planning, which triggered legal backlash.

== History ==
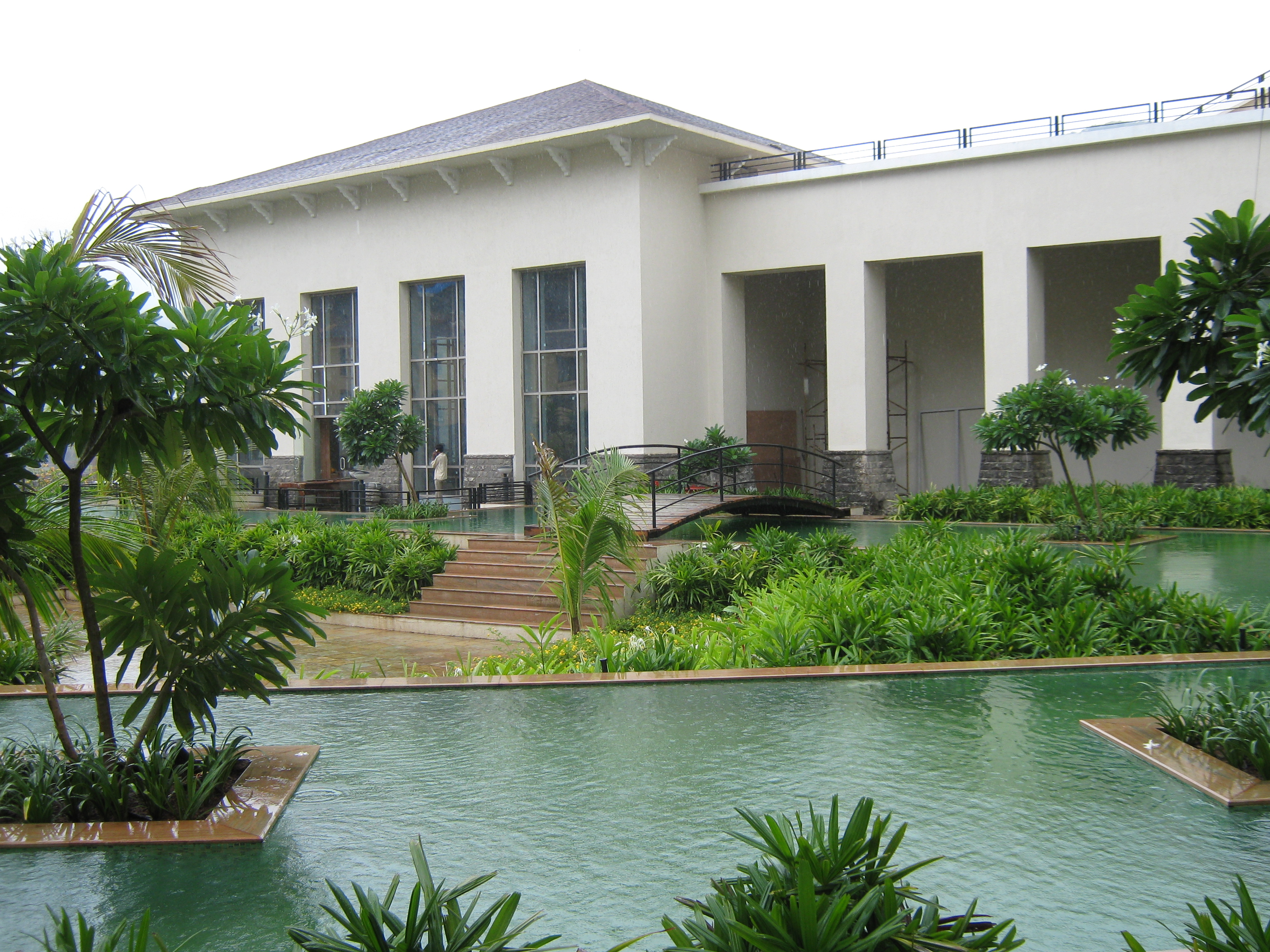
Fortune Hotel, Lavasa

Billed as India's first hill station since independence, the plans for this private grand township were unveiled by Ajit Gulabchand in 2006. The architectural team responsible for the design of the town wanted it be an imitation of an Italian hill-side town.

=== Land ===
The area demarcated for Lavasa is located near Pune in the Mulshi valley of the Western Ghats.

=== Current progress ===
Construction of two out of the five planned towns is ongoing, and a number of residences have were completed in 2013. By 2011 four hotels and a city centre were completed. A primary, middle, and high school, Le Mont High, were constructed as well. The town also boasted a hospitality management college, École hôtelière Lavasa.

=== Administration ===
Scot Wrighton was the administrator of the city as of 2011 and held the office until 2019.

=== Surrounding village ===
Smaller, pre-existing communities sometimes interact with Lavasa and its residents. Some have been the focus of CSR efforts, and villagers provide construction labour to the project.

== Future plans ==
Lavasa has established a pattern of promoting planned partnerships with prestigious, overseas institutions that do not ultimately see fruition. Oxford University had at one point associated itself with the project, but other, name-brand plans including future sports facilities have yet to be officially cancelled.

The city has a better track record when it comes to construction; some sections are complete today. Lavasa may not be finished before 2030, however. When fully built, its total population has the potential to reach 200,000, and it will consist of four or five towns built on seven hills. The first of these, Dasve, was initially slated to be complete by 2010 although some residences there were still under construction as of 2013. Mugaon, the second town, may be finished in 2013, and as of May, 2013, construction continues. Work on this town began in mid-2012. In 2013, the chairman of the construction company building the project confirmed that Lavasa will include four large towns.

== Insolvency ==
On August 30, 2018, the NCLT Mumbai Bench admitted an insolvency petition against Lavasa Corp. Ltd. (subsidiary of Hindustan Construction Co. Ltd) filed by one of its creditors, Raj Infrastructure Development (India) Pvt. Ltd.

In 2023, the city's acquisition was approved by the National Company Law Tribunal to Darwin Platform Infrastructure Limited (DPIL) for ₹1,814 crore.

In September 2024, the NCLT scrapped the DPIL resolution plan and directed a fresh insolvency proceeding, taking the situation of development of Lavasa to the same as in 2018.

== Education ==
The CHRIST (Deemed to be University) Pune Lavasa (Residential) campus is an off campus Institution of CHRIST (Deemed to be University) Bangalore, which was established in Lavasa in 2014 is the only active educational institution in Lavasa.

== Awards and recognition ==
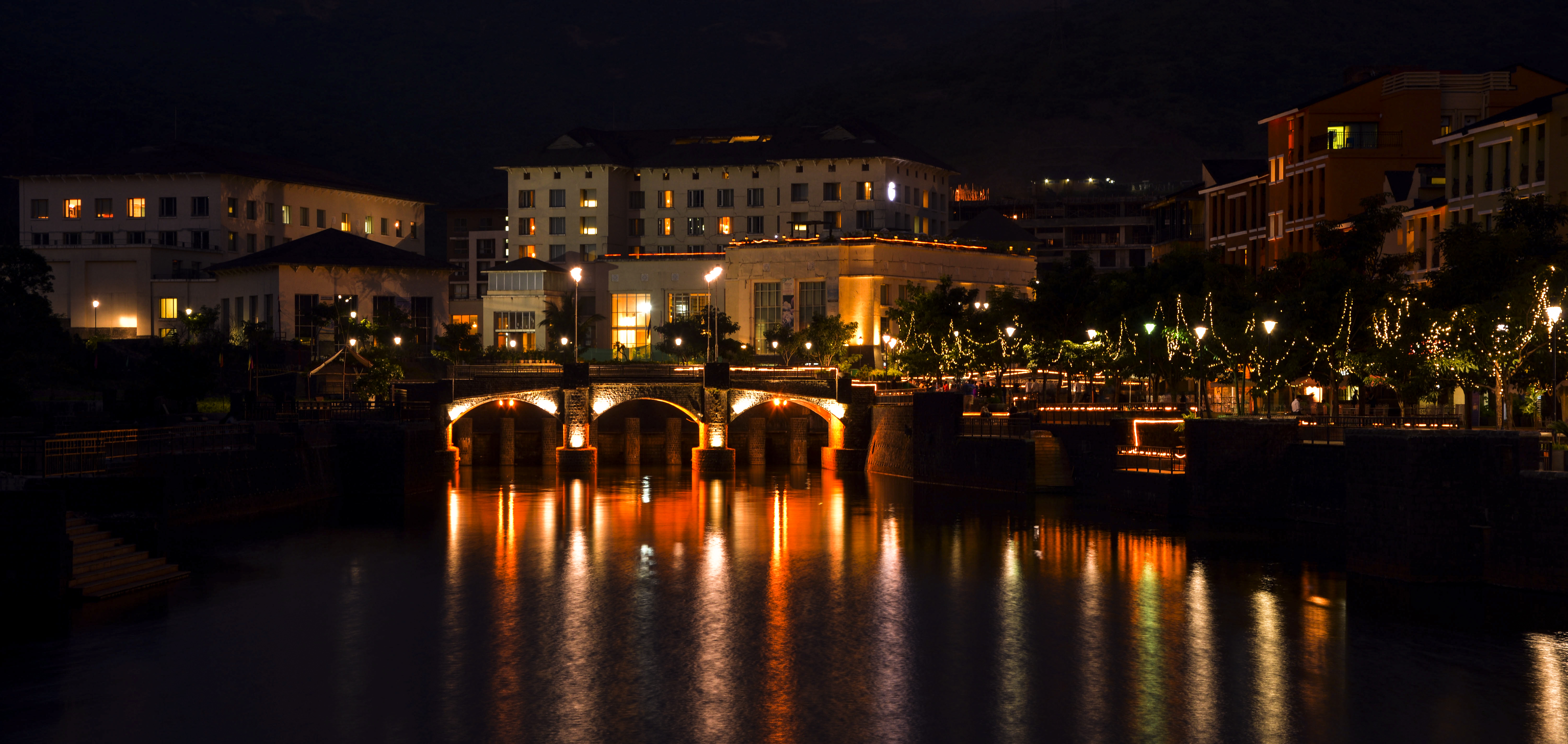
Architecture at Lavasa

Lavasa has won several awards for its plans and designs. In 2005, Dasve village in Lavasa won awards from the Congress for the New Urbanism and the American Society of Landscape Architects. In 2009, the St. Louis chapter of the American Society of Landscape Architects recognised the Lavasa landscape master plan with a merit award.

== Controversies ==
=== Environmental damage ===
An Indian Ministry of Environment and Forests team investigating Lavasa concluded that the city has caused environmental damage, since Lavasa is built "in the scenic hills of the Western Ghats, a UNESCO World Heritage Site known for its evergreen tropical forests that shelter 325 species of vulnerable or endangered animals, birds and fauna." Post reviewing the project, this ministry provided clearance on 9 November 2011 to Lavasa with specific conditions, such as a cessation of hill cutting activities, building of a sewage treatment plant, and anti-poverty CSR measures aimed at the local population.

==== Quarrying ====
While Lavasa has stone crushing permits, its operations have been described as "hill cutting" and "quarrying" by the Indian Ministry of Environment and Forests, and the environmental impact of these activities was investigated. In 2014, Mrs. Jayanti Natarajan, in her open letter to Congress president, stated that she had got a specific input from Rahul Gandhi's office to stall the project.

=== Land acquisition ===
Both government and individual land owners have taken issue with Lavasa's land acquisition approach.

A report by the Maharashtra environment department claims 600 hectares (1,500 acres) of land bought by Lavasa Corporation was purchased from farmers who had been granted it by the Indian State. Because of the way in which the farmers obtained the land, three fourths of the purchase price should have been paid to the State. The report states Lavasa Corporation only paid 2%. It also alleges that 141 hectares (350 acres) of Lavasa were leased for far less than its actual value by the Maharashtra Krishna Valley Development Corporation and that Lavasa bought 98 hectares (240 acres) of land without license.

Some also say that Lavasa is being built on what was obtained through coercion. However, Lavasa Corporation denies this.

=== Use of water resources ===
Lavasa will use the same water resources that currently supply Pune, and it is claimed that this move is likely to cause a supply shortage. However, a 2011 report by the Expert Appraisal Committee of the Union Environment Ministry concluded that there will be no impact on Pune's water supply.

=== Orders to halt construction ===
For a one-year period from late 2010 to late 2011, construction of Lavasa was halted due to orders issued by the Ministry of Environment and Forests. In late 2010, it ordered Lavasa Corporation to halt further construction for not having gathered proper clearances. In November 2011, this ministry relented, and construction is no longer impeded by law. While grant of an environmental clearance was recommended in May, 2011, Lavasa was only alerted to the fact that clearance was granted on 9 November 2011.

=== Accusations of nepotism ===
Sharad Pawar, an Indian politician born in the state of Maharashtra, is alleged to have demanded compensation for allowing Lavasa to be constructed. When Lavasa Corporation was receiving necessary clearances from the government of Maharashtra, relatives of Pawar had part-ownership of the company developing the project. Pawar's daughter and son-in-law had more than 20% ownership between 2002 and 2004, and they later sold their stakes. A nephew of his was the chairman of Maharashtra Krishna Valley Development Corporation when it signed off on lease agreements for Lavasa and allowed Lavasa to store water and build dams.

== See also ==
- Aamby Valley City
