= Bertram, Texas =

- City
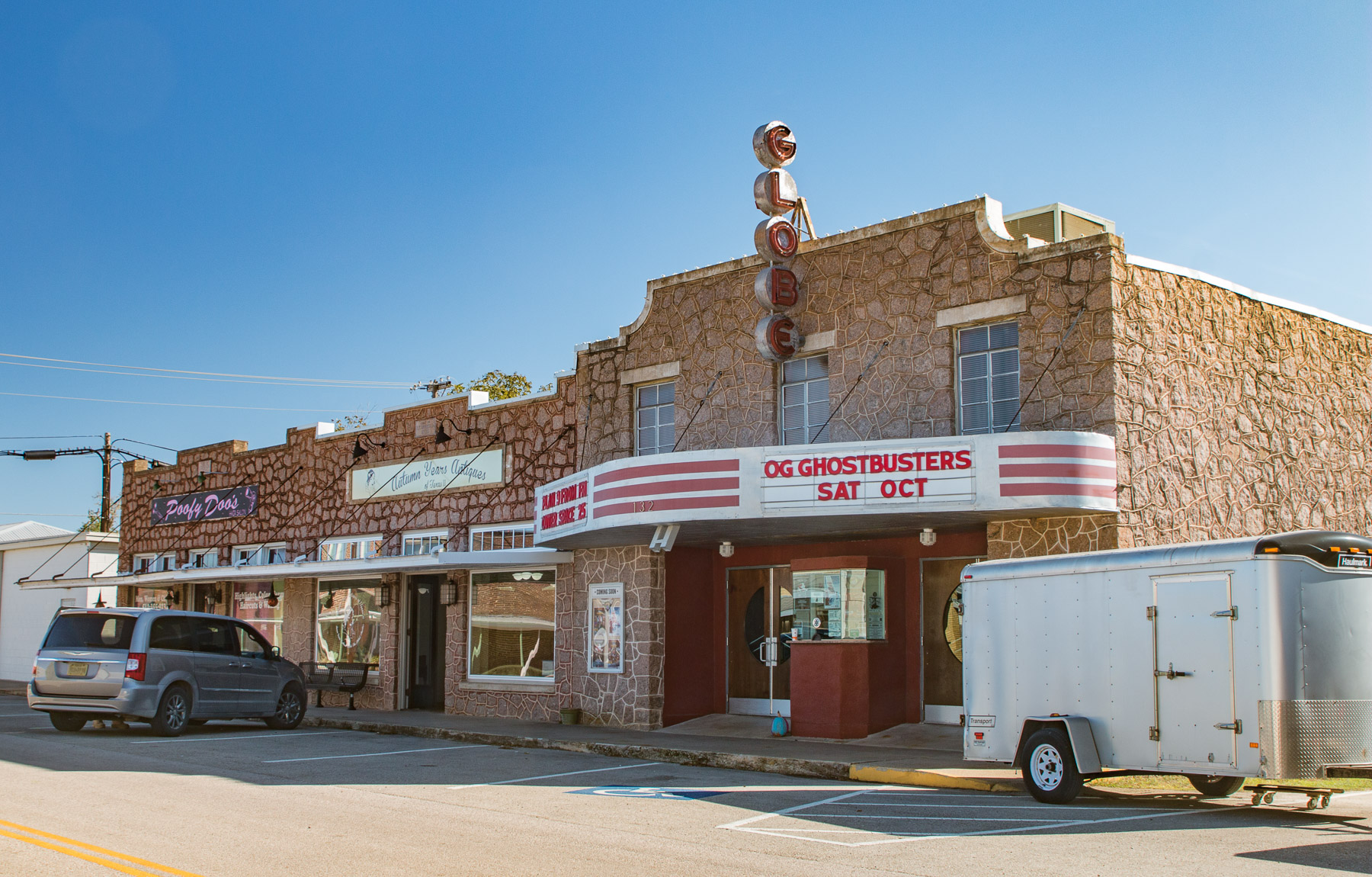
- Globe Theater
- Interactive map of Bertram, Texas
- Coordinates: 30°44′43″N 98°03′27″W
- Country: United States
- State: Texas
- County: Burnet
- Established: 1882

Government
  - Type: City Council

Area
  - Total: 1.53 sq mi (3.95 km^{2})
  - Land: 1.51 sq mi (3.91 km^{2})
  - Water: 0.015 sq mi (0.04 km^{2})
- Elevation: 1,257 ft (383 m)

Population (2020)
  - Total: 1,616
  - Density: 1,070/sq mi (413/km^{2})
- Time zone: UTC-6 (Central (CST))
  - Summer (DST): UTC-5 (CDT)
- ZIP code: 78605
- Area code: 512
- FIPS code: 48-07864
- GNIS feature ID: 2409838
- Website: www.cityofbertram.org

Bertram (/ˈbərtrəm/ BUR-trəm) is a city in Burnet County, Texas, United States. Its population was 2,020 in the 2024 estimate, up from 1,616 at the 2020 census.

== Geography ==
Bertram is located in eastern Burnet County, 10 miles (16 km) east of Burnet, the county seat.

According to the United States Census Bureau, Bertram has a total area of 1.5 square miles (4.0 km^{2}), over 99% land.

=== Climate ===
The climate in this area is characterized by hot, humid summers and generally mild to cold winters. According to the Köppen climate classification, Bertram has a humid subtropical climate, Cfa on climate maps.

== History ==
Bertram is at the junction of Farm Roads 243 and 1174 and State Highway 29, 10 miles east of Burnet in eastern Burnet County. The town was established in 1882, when the community of San Gabriel (near the San Gabriel River) in Burnet County was moved two miles northwest to the newly constructed Austin and Northwestern Railroad. The new community was named for Austin merchant Rudolph Bertram, the largest stockholder in the railroad. A post office opened in 1882, and by 1891, the town had an estimated population of 150, a cotton gin-gristmill, three general stores, a grocer, a blacksmith, a shoemaker, and two wagonmakers. After 1900, Bertram was a shipping point for cotton, cattle, and wool. In 1928, a record 11,624 bales of cotton were ginned in the town.

In the early 1930s, plummeting cotton prices and the Great Depression caused the town's population to decline from a high of 1,000 in 1929 to 550 by 1931. It was 600 in 1949, and by 1966, stood at 1,205. In 1989, the town had an estimated population of 1,002 and 19 businesses. At that time, Bertram's principal industries included the manufacture of ceramic floor tiles, paving tiles, marble fixtures, and vacuum-formed and molded plastic products. In 1990, the census population was 849.

Major League Baseball player John Owen "Chief" Wilson lived in Bertram. The local baseball field is named for him.

== Demographics ==
Historical population
Census	Pop.	Note	%±
1980	824		—
1990	849		3.0%
2000	1,122		32.2%
2010	1,353		20.6%
2020	1,616		19.4%
2024 (est.)	2,020		25.0%
U.S. Decennial Census

=== 2020 census ===
As of the 2020 census, Bertram had a population of 1,616. The median age was 39.1 years; 23.6% of residents were under the age of 18 and 17.5% of residents were 65 years of age or older. For every 100 females there were 97.6 males, and for every 100 females age 18 and over there were 93.0 males. There were 478 families residing in the city.

0% of residents lived in urban areas, while 100.0% lived in rural areas.

There were 570 households in Bertram, of which 39.5% had children under the age of 18 living in them. Of all households, 51.8% were married-couple households, 17.0% were households with a male householder and no spouse or partner present, and 24.6% were households with a female householder and no spouse or partner present. About 20.2% of all households were made up of individuals and 8.6% had someone living alone who was 65 years of age or older.

There were 624 housing units, of which 8.7% were vacant. Among occupied housing units, 73.3% were owner-occupied and 26.7% were renter-occupied. The homeowner vacancy rate was 1.9% and the rental vacancy rate was 8.4%.

Racial composition as of the 2020 census
Race	Percent
White	74.9%
Black or African American	1.6%
American Indian and Alaska Native	0.7%
Asian	0.9%
Native Hawaiian and Other Pacific Islander	0.1%
Some other race	9.3%
Two or more races	12.4%
Hispanic or Latino (of any race)	26.2%

=== 2000 census ===
At the 2000 census, 1,122 people, 387 households, and 280 families were residing in the city. The population density was 1,031.3 per square mile (398.2/km^{2}). The 434 housing units had an average density of 398.9 per square mile (154.0/km^{2}). The racial makeup was 88.24% White, 0.89% African American, 0.62% Native American, 0.09% Pacific Islander, 9.09% from other races, and 1.07% from two or more races. Hispanics or Latinos of any race were 21.21% of the population.

Of the 387 households, 36.2% had children under 18 living with them, 62.0% were married couples living together, 7.2% had a female householder with no husband present, and 27.4% were not families. About 25.6% of all households were made up of individuals, and 13.7% had someone living alone who was 65 or older. The average household size was 2.69 and the average family size was 3.24.

In the city, the age distribution was 24.6% under 18, 8.7% from 18 to 24, 27.5% from 25 to 44, 20.7% from 45 to 64 and 18.5% older than 64. The median age was 37 years. For every 100 females, there were 90.2 males. For every 100 females 18 and over, there were 88.8 males.

The median household income was $36,250 and the median family income was $42,031. Males had a median income of $29,688 and females $20,179. The per capita income for the city was $14,132. About 7.0% of families and 8.3% of the population were below the poverty line, including 8.3% of those under 18 and 22.0% of those 65 or over.

== Culture ==
Bertram hosts an annual Oatmeal Festival during the Labor Day weekend. Named after the remains of the nearby community of Oatmeal, it includes a number of activities that draw attendees from all over Central Texas. The Oatmeal Festival began in 1978 as a spoof of the many chili cook-offs in Texas. Ken Odiorne, who had lived in the Oatmeal community, was the first organizer, with National Oats, the makers of 3 Minute Oats, as a sponsor.

Over the years, the money raised has built an open-air pavilion in Bertram and a community center at Oatmeal. Scholarships are given to local high-school graduates every year. Financial assistance has been given to many local events, including the Easter Egg Hunt, Santa's Workshop, and Burnet County Livestock Show.

== Education ==
Bertram is served by the Burnet Consolidated Independent School District. In 2007, Bertram Elementary School was named a National Blue Ribbon School.

== Gallery ==
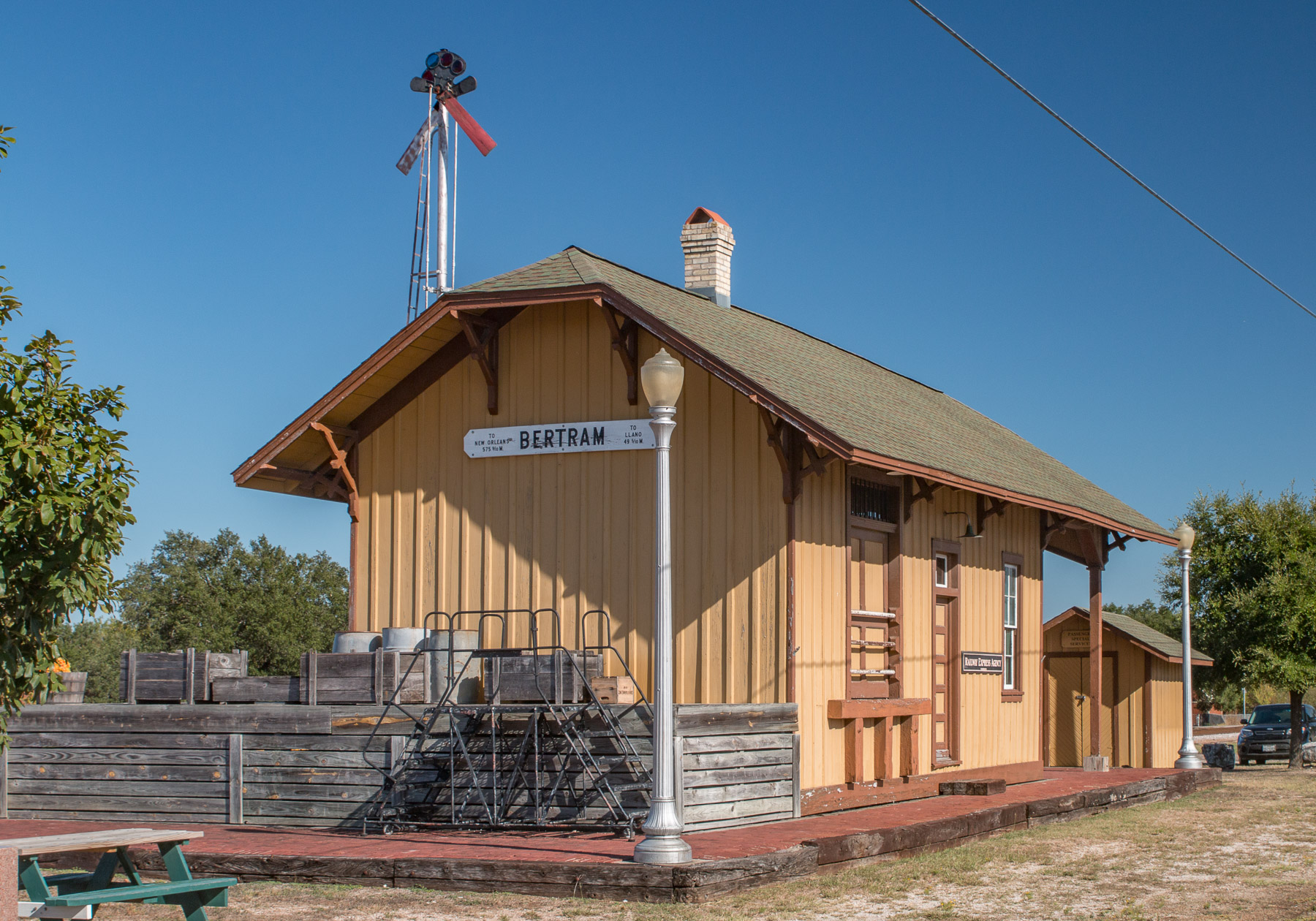
Train Depot

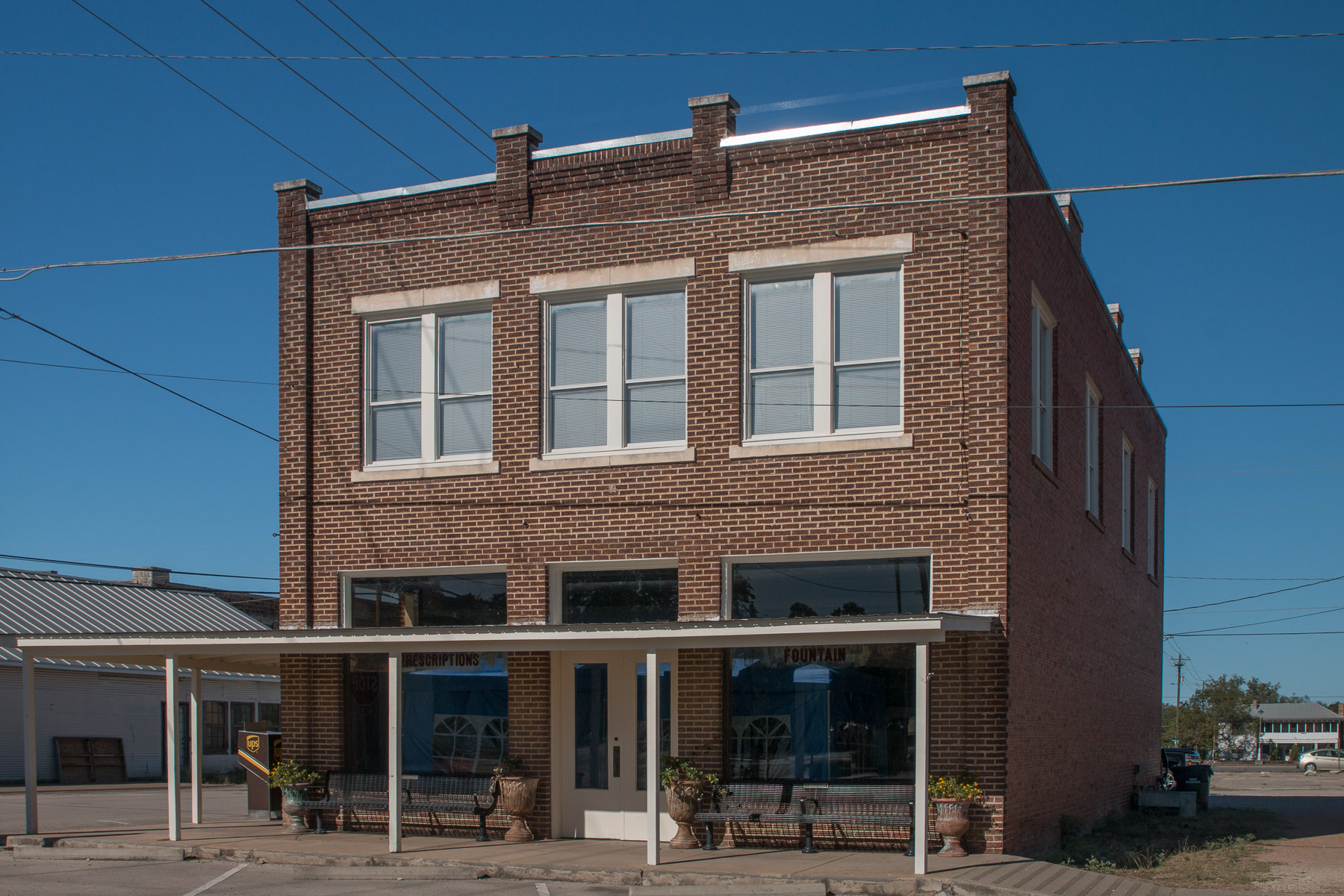
Downtown Bertram

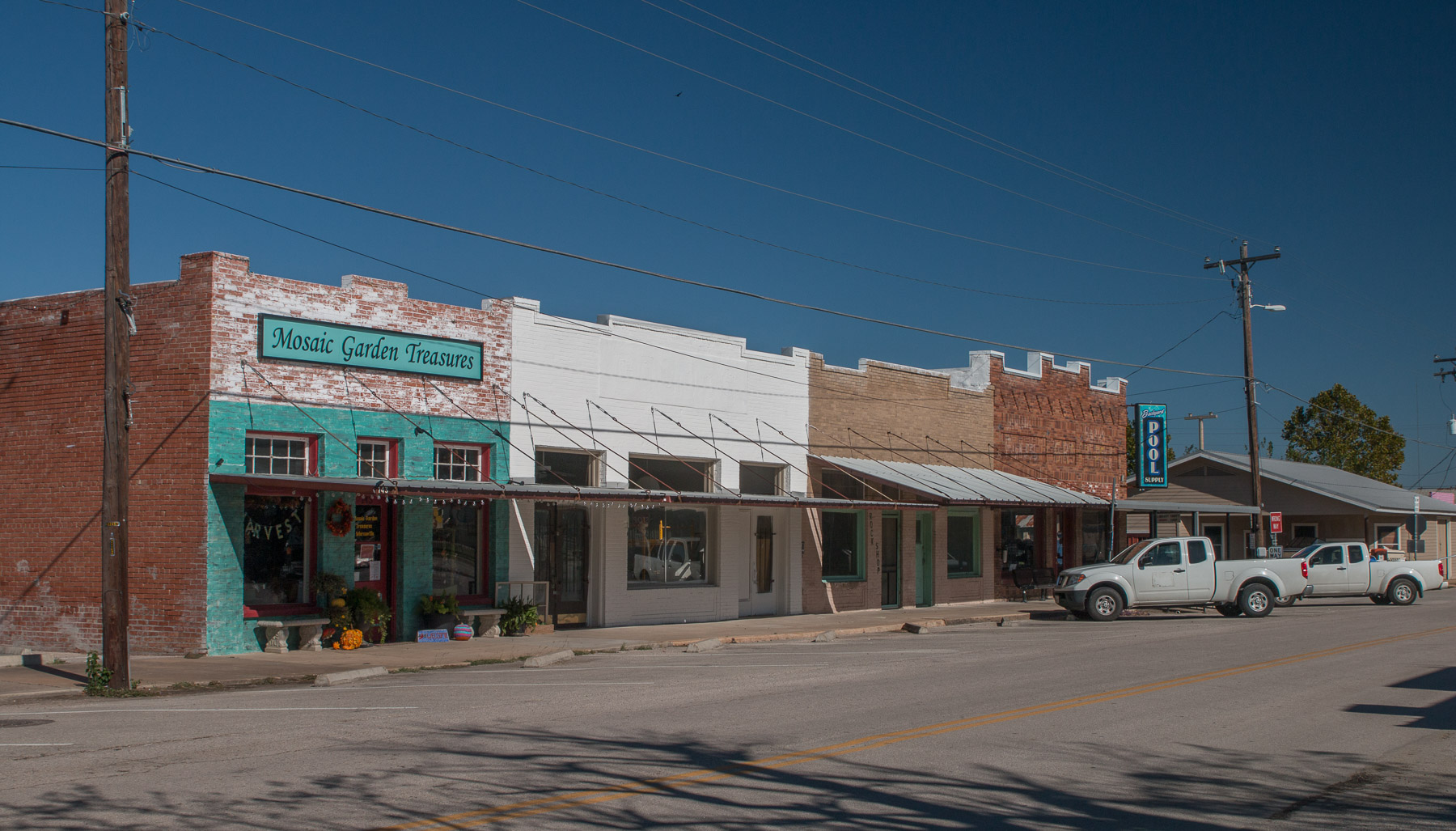
Downtown Bertram

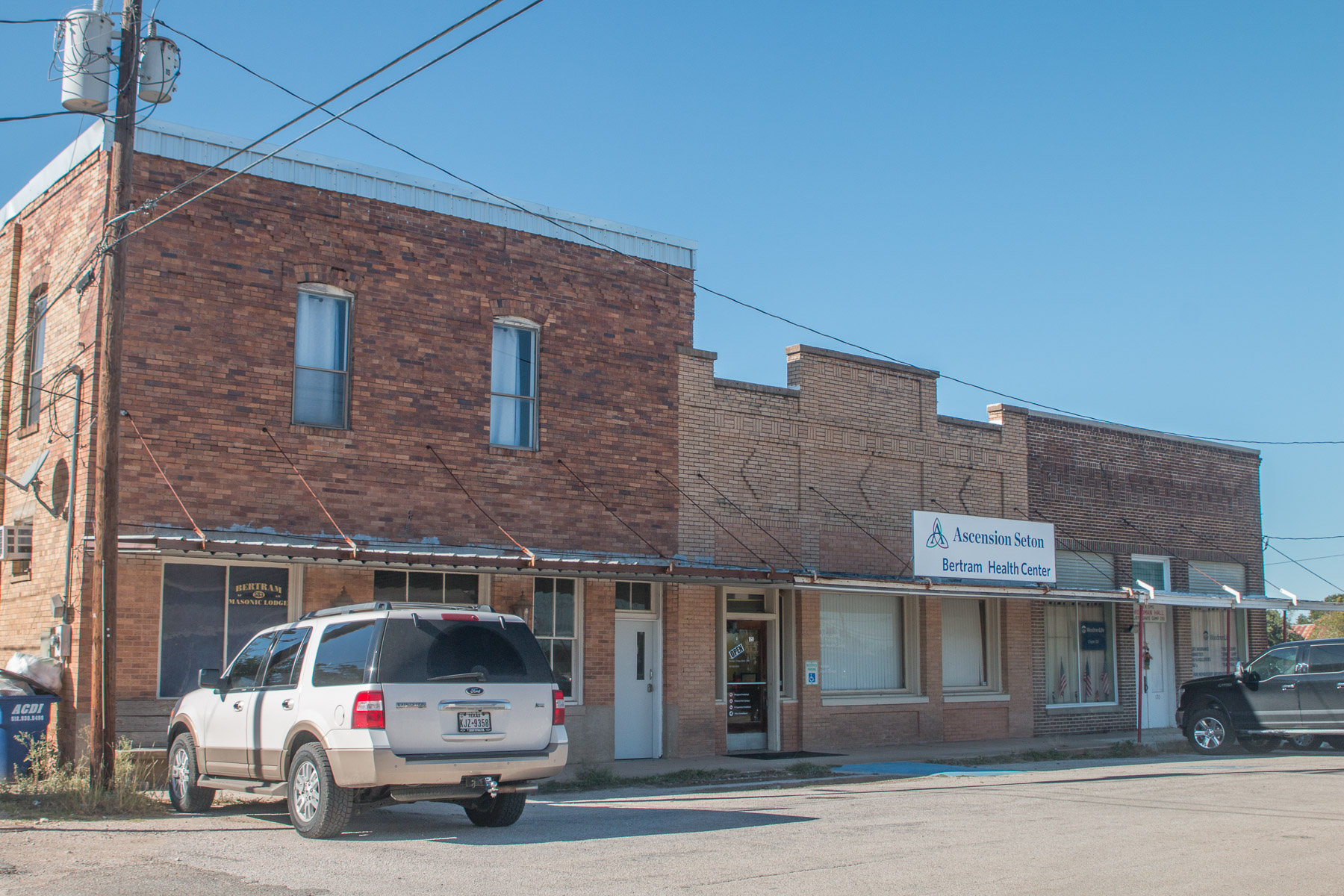
Downtown Bertram

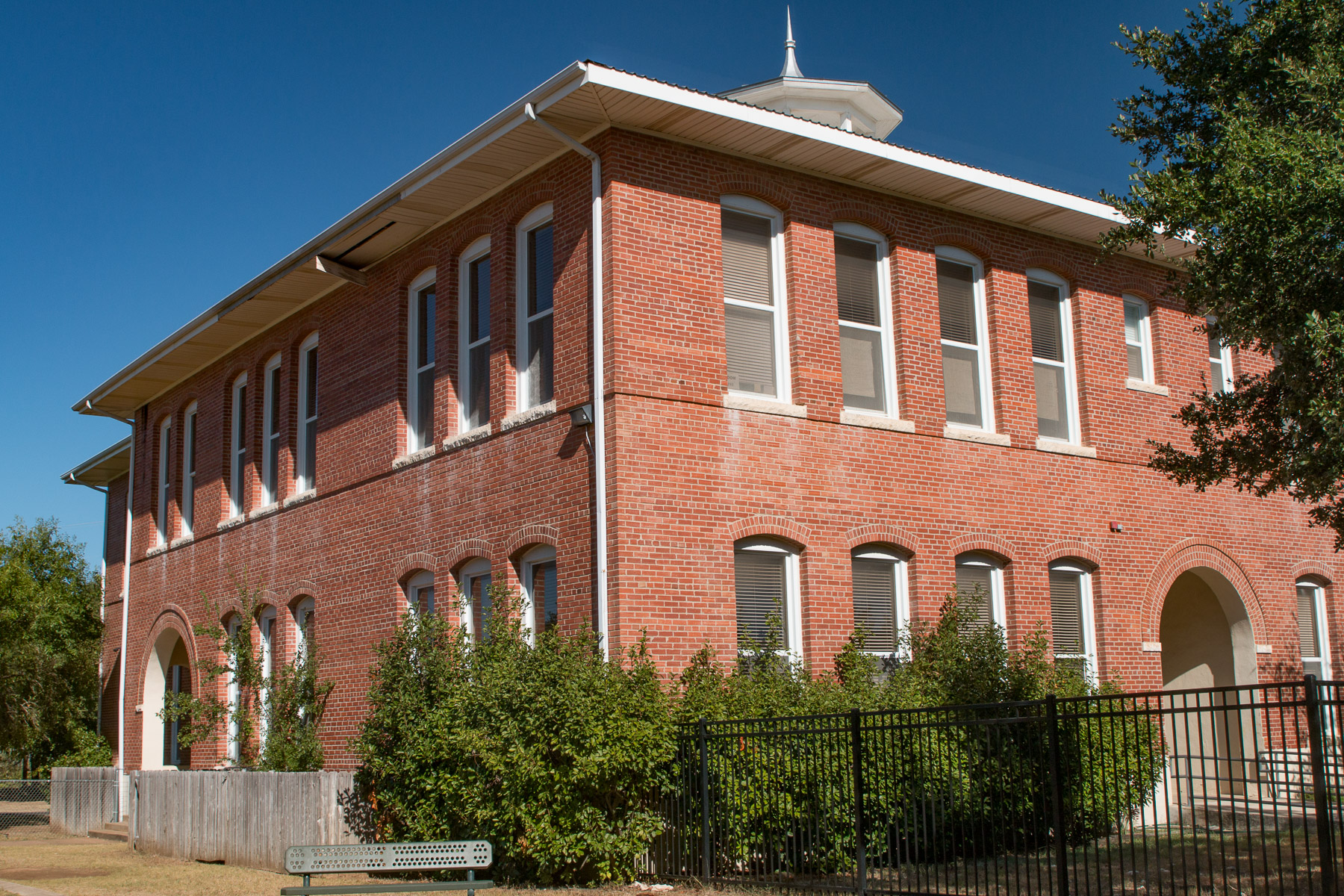
Bertram School

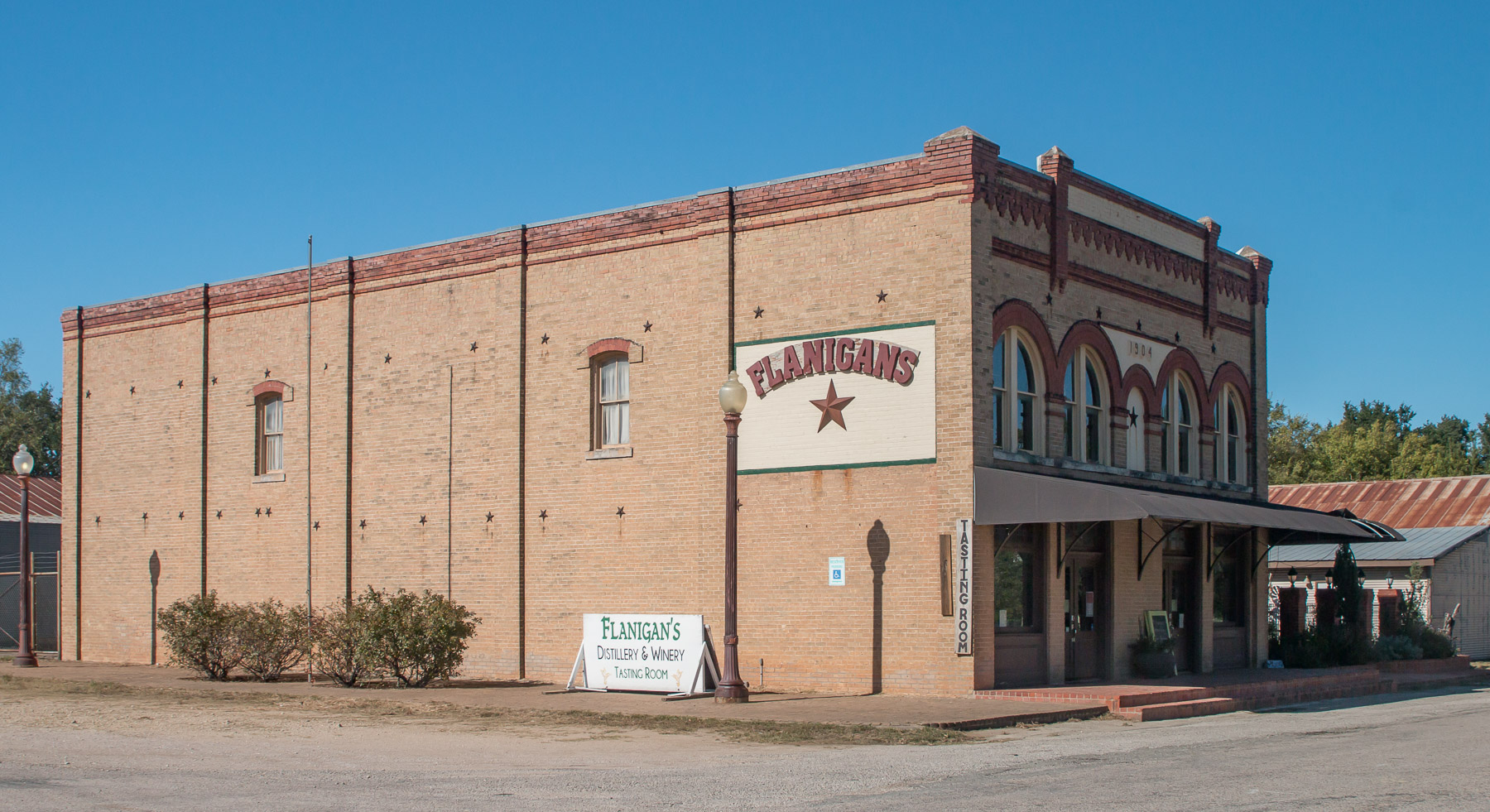
Flanigan's Texas Distillery and Winery

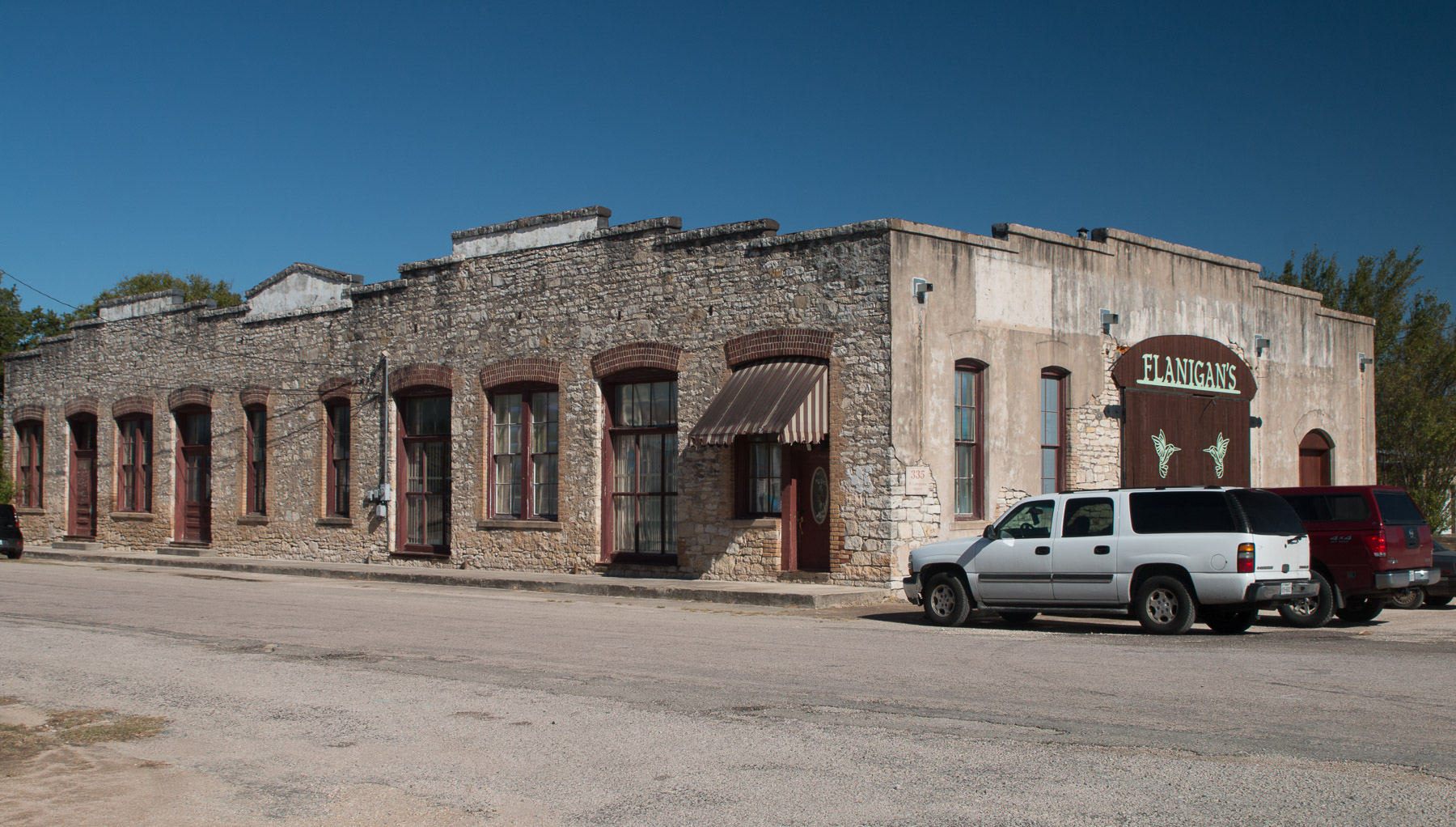
Flanigan's Building
